= Senator Garcia =

Senator Garcia may refer to:

== Mexico (Senate of the Republic) ==
- Amalia García (born 1951)
- Angélica García Arrieta (1958–2018)
- Francisco García Lizardi (born 1941)
- José Luis García Zalvidea (born 1955)
- María García Quiroz (born 1968)
- Martha Elena García Gómez (born 1945)
- Ricardo García Cervantes (born 1954)
- Samuel García Sepúlveda (born 1987)

== Puerto Rico (Senate of Puerto Rico) ==
- Fernando Martín García (fl. 1980s–2000s)

== United States ==
- Alex P. Garcia (1929–1999), California State Senate
- Chuy García (born 1956), Illinois State Senate
- Ileana Garcia (born 1969), Florida State Senate
- Joey Garcia (born 1983), West Virginia State Senate
- Jorge Luis Garcia (1953–2010), Arizona State Senate
- Leroy Garcia (born 1981), Colorado State Senate
- Maria Garcia (Arizona politician) (fl. 2010s), Arizona State Senate
- Mary Jane Garcia (born 1936), New Mexico State Senate
- René García (politician) (born 1974), Florida State Senate
- Robert Garcia (New York politician) (1933–2017), New York State Senate
- Rudy García (Florida politician) (born 1963), Florida State Senate
- Sylvia Garcia (born 1950), Texas State Senate
- Valde Garcia (born 1958), Michigan State Senate
