= LXI Legislature of the Mexican Congress =

61st Congress LXI Legislatura
←	60th	62nd	→

Overview
- Legislative body: Congress of the Union
- Meeting place: Palacio Legislativo de San Lázaro (Chamber of Deputies); Edificio del Senado (Senate)
- Term: 1 September 2009 – 31 August 2012
- Election: 5 July 2006

Senate of the Republic
- Members: 128

Chamber of Deputies
- Members: 500

The LXI Legislature of the Congress of the Union, the 61st session of the Congress of Mexico, met from 1 September 2009 to 31 August 2012. Members of the upper house of the Congress were selected in the elections of July 2006 while members of the lower house of the Congress were selected in the elections of July 2009.

== Composition ==
Out of 128 Senate seats, the Institutional Revolutionary Party (known as the PRI) controlled 50; the conservative National Action Party (PAN) controlled 33; while the left-wing Party of the Democratic Revolution (PRD) controlled 23. Additionally, the Green Party of Mexico controlled eight seats, the Labor Party and the New Alliance Party each controlled five, and the Citizens' Movement four.

Out of 500 seats of the Chamber of Deputies, the PRI had 239; the PAN had 142; and the PRD controlled 69. Among smaller parties, the Green Party controlled 23, the Labor Party controlled 13, the New Alliance controlled seven, and the Citizens' Movement controlled 6. Additionally there was one independent.

== Senators ==
=== By state ===
State	Name	Party	State	Name	Party
Aguascalientes	Rubén Camarillo Ortega	PAN	Morelos	Sergio Álvarez Mata	PAN
Aguascalientes	Norma Esparza; Replacing Carlos Lozano de la Torre	PRI	Morelos	Adrián Rivera Pérez	PAN
Aguascalientes	Felipe González González	PAN	Nayarit	Francisco Javier Castellón	PRD
Baja California	Fernando Castro Trenti	PRI	Nayarit	Raúl José Mejía González	PRI
Baja California	Jaime Rafael Díaz Ochoa	PAN	Nayarit	Gerardo Montenegro Ibarra	PRI
Baja California	Alejandro González Alcocer	PAN	Nuevo León	Eloy Cantú Segovia	PRI
Baja California Sur	Luis Coppola Joffroy	PAN	Nuevo León	Blanca Judith Díaz Delgado	PAN
Baja California Sur	Josefina Cota Cota	PRD	Nuevo León	Fernando Elizondo Barragán	PAN
Baja California Sur	Francisco Javier Obregón Espinoza	PT	Oaxaca	Armando Contreras Castillo; Replacing Salomón Jara Cruz	PRD
Campeche	Sebastián Calderón Centeno	PAN	Oaxaca	Ericel Gómez; Replacing Gabino Cué Monteagudo	MC
Campeche	Carmen Guadalupe Fonz; Replacing Fernando Ortega Bernés	PRI	Oaxaca	Adolfo Toledo Infanzón	PRI
Campeche	Alejandro Moreno Cárdenas	PRI	Puebla	Humberto Aguilar Coronado	PAN
Chiapas	María Elena Orantes	PRI	Puebla	María Leticia Jasso; Replacing Rafael Moreno Valle	PAN
Chiapas	Rubén Velázquez López	PRD	Puebla	Melquiades Morales	PRI
Chihuahua	Fernando Baeza Meléndez	PRI	Querétaro	María García Quiroz; Replacing José Eduardo Calzada Rovirosa	PRI
Chihuahua	Ramón Galindo Noriega	PAN	Querétaro	Eduardo Nava Bolaños	PAN
Chihuahua	Gustavo Madero Muñoz	PAN	Querétaro	Guillermo Tamborrel Suárez	PAN
Coahuila	José Guillermo Anaya Llamas	PAN	Quintana Roo	José Luis García Zalvidea	PRD
Coahuila	Jesús María Ramón Valdés	PRI	Quintana Roo	Pedro Joaquín Coldwell	PRI
Coahuila	Ernesto Saro Boardman	PAN	Quintana Roo	Ludivina Menchaca	PVEM
Colima	Jesús Dueñas Llerenas	PAN	San Luis Potosí	Eugenio Govea Arcos	MC
Colima	Rogelio Rueda Sánchez	PRI	San Luis Potosí	Carlos Jiménez Macías	PRI
Colima	Martha Leticia Sosa Govea	PAN	San Luis Potosí	Alejandro Zapata Perogordo	PAN
Federal District	René Arce Islas	PVEM	Sinaloa	Francisco Labastida Ochoa	PRI
Federal District	Federico Döring	PAN	Sinaloa	María Serrano Serrano; Replacing Heriberto Félix Guerra	PAN
Federal District	Pablo Gómez Álvarez	PRD	Sinaloa	Margarita Villaescusa Rojo; Replacing Mario López Valdez	PRI
Durango	Andrés Galván Rivas	PAN	Sonora	Javier Castelo Parada	PAN
Durango	Juán Quiñones Ruiz; Replacing Rodolfo Dorador	PAN	Sonora	Alfonso Elías Serrano	PRI
Durango	Ricardo Pacheco Rodríguez	PRI	Sonora	Emma Larios Gaxiola; Replacing Guillermo Padrés Elías	PAN
Guanajuato	Humberto Andrade Quezada	PAN	Tabasco	Dolores Gutiérrez Zurita; Replacing Arturo Núñez Jiménez	PRD
Guanajuato	Francisco Arroyo Vieyra	PRI	Tabasco	Francisco Herrera León	PRI
Guanajuato	Luis Alberto Villarreal	PAN	Tabasco	Martha Jiménez Oropeza; Replacing Rosalinda López Hernández	PRD
Guerrero	Julio César Aguirre Méndez; Replacing Lázaro Mazón Alonso	PRD	Tamaulipas	Amira Griselda Gómez	PRI
Guerrero	Antelmo Alvarado; Replacing Ángel Aguirre Rivero	PRI	Tamaulipas	Nelly González Aguilar; Replacing Alejandro Galván Garza	PAN
Guerrero	Valentín Guzmán Soto; Replacing David Jiménez Rumbo	PRD	Tamaulipas	José Julián Sacramento	PAN
Hidalgo	Francisco Xavier Berganza	PANAL	Tlaxcala	Minerva Hernández Ramos	PAN
Hidalgo	José Guadarrama Márquez	PRD	Tlaxcala	Rosalía Peredo	PANAL
Hidalgo	Jesús Murillo Karam	PRI	Tlaxcala	Alfonso Sánchez Anaya	PRD
Jalisco	Eva Contreras Sandoval; Replacing Alberto Cárdenas Jiménez	PAN	Veracruz	Juan Bueno Torio	PAN
Jalisco	Héctor Pérez Plazola	PAN	Veracruz	Dante Delgado Rannauro	MC
Jalisco	Rafael Yerena Zambrano; Replacing Ramiro Hernández García	PRI	Veracruz	Arturo Herviz Reyes	PRD
Mexico	Héctor Miguel Bautista López	PRD	Yucatán	Alfredo Rodríguez y Pacheco	PAN
Mexico	María Guadalupe Mondragón; Replacing Ulises Ramírez Núñez	PAN	Yucatán	María Beatriz Zavala Peniche	PAN
Mexico	Yeidckol Polevnsky	PRD	Yucatán	Cleominio Zoreda Novelo; Replacing Ivonne Ortega Pacheco	PRI
Michoacán	Silvano Aureoles Conejo	PRD	Zacatecas	Antonio Mejía Haro	PRD
Michoacán	Marko Antonio Cortés Mendoza	PAN	Zacatecas	Tomás Torres Mercado	PVEM
Michoacán	Leonel Godoy Rangel	PRD	Zacatecas	José Isabel Trejo	PAN

=== Plurinominal Senators ===
State	Name	Party	State	State	Name
Federal District	Carlos Humberto Aceves	PRI	Federal District	Jorge Legorreta Ordorica; Replacing Gabriela Aguilar García	PVEM
Federal District	Francisco Agundis Arias	PVEM	Federal District	Jorge Mendoza Garza	PRI
Puebla	Ángel Alonso Díaz Caneja	PAN	Zacatecas	Ricardo Monreal	PT
Aguascalientes	Alberto Anaya	PT	Federal District	María de los Ángeles Moreno	PRI
Federal District	Manlio Fabio Beltrones	PRI	Federal District	Ramón Muñoz Gutiérrez	PAN
Federal District	Claudia Corichi García	PRD	Guanajuato	Carlos Navarrete Ruiz	PRD
Federal District	Santiago Creel	PAN	Federal District	Jorge Ocejo Moreno	PAN
Federal District	Arturo Escobar y Vega	PVEM	Aguascalientes	Rafael Ochoa Guzmán	PANAL
Coahuila	Ricardo García Cervantes	PAN	Federal District	Javier Orozco Gómez; Replacing Irma Ortega Fajardo	PVEM
Veracruz	Francisco García Lizardi; Replacing Jose Luis Lobato	MC	Federal District	Teresa Ortuño Gurza	PAN
Mexico	Adriana González Carrillo	PAN	Federal District	Heladio Ramírez	PRI
Michoacán	José González Morfin	PAN	Federal District	María Rojo	PRD
Durango	Alejandro González Yáñez	PT	Sinaloa	Gabriela Ruiz del Rincón	PAN
Federal District	Rosario Green	PRI	Colima	Carlos Sotelo García	PRD
Federal District	Julián Güitrón Fuentevilla	MC	Guanajuato	Ricardo Torres Origel	PAN
Sinaloa	Augusto César Leal Angulo	PAN	Colima	Rosario Ibarra	PT

== Deputies ==
=== By relative majority election ===
State	Name	Party	State	Name	Party
Yucatán	Efraín Aguilar Góngora; Replacing Angélica Araujo Lara	PRI	Puebla	Juan Carlos Lastiri	PRI
Puebla	José Óscar Aguilar González	PRI	Mexico	Israel Ledesma Magaña	PRI
Guanajuato	Viviana Agundiz; Replacing Juan Pascualli Gómez	PAN	Zacatecas	Gerardo Leyva Hernández	PRD
Morelos	José Manuel Agüero Tovar	PRI	Federal District	Vidal Llerenas Morales	PRD
Veracruz	Ricardo Ahued	PRI	Chiapas	Sergio Lobato García	PRI
Guerrero	Esteban Albarrán Mendoza	PRI	Chiapas	Juan Carlos López Fernández	PRD
Yucatán	María Ester Alonzo Morales; Replacing Felipe Cervera	PRI	Tlaxcala	Oralia López Hernández	PAN
Guerrero	Fermín Alvarado Arroyo	PRI	Tlaxcala	Perla López Loyo	PRI
Veracruz	José Luis Álvarez Martínez; Replacing José Tomás Carrillo	PRI	Durango	Ricardo López Pescador	PRI
Oaxaca	Heriberto Ambrosio	PRI	Jalisco	Jorge Humberto López Portillo	PRI
Aguascalientes	Antonio Arámbula López	PAN	Guanajuato	Ruth Lugo	PAN
Jalisco	Jorge Arana Arana	PRI	Querétaro	Alfredo Lugo Oñate	PRI
Baja California	Óscar Martín Arce Paniagua	PAN	Baja California	Gastón Luken Garza	PAN
Guanajuato	Rubén Arellano	PAN	Mexico	Miguel Ángel Luna Munguía	PRI
Guanajuato	Cecilia Soledad Arévalo	PAN	Michoacán	Israel Madrigal Ceja; Replacing Julio César Godoy Toscano	PRD
Durango	Pedro Ávila Nevárez; Replacing Jorge Herrera Caldera	PRI	Jalisco	César Octavio Madrigal Díaz	PAN
Tabasco	José Antonio Aysa	PRI	Baja California	César Mancillas Amador	PAN
Nuevo León	Eduardo Bailey Elizondo	PRI	Puebla	Julieta Marín Torres	PRI
Nuevo León	Víctor Alejandro Balderas	PAN	Sonora	Onésimo Mariscales	PRI
San Luis Potosí	Sabino Bautista Concepción	PRI	Chihuahua	Guillermo Márquez Lizalde	PRI
Tabasco	Nicolás Bellizia Aboaf	PRI	Chiapas	José Manuel Marroquín Toledo	PAN
Mexico	Carlos Bello Otero	PAN	Veracruz	Miguel Martín López	PAN
Veracruz	Antonio Benítez Lucho	PRI	Veracruz	Luis Antonio Martínez Armengol	PRI
Guerrero	María Benítez Navarrete; Replacing Mario Moreno Arcos	PRI	Coahuila	Hugo Héctor Martínez González	PRI
Guanajuato	Erandi Bermúdez	PAN	Chiapas	Carlos Martínez Martínez	PAN
Sinaloa	Rolando Bojórquez Gutiérrez	PRI	Querétaro	Miguel Martínez Peñaloza	PAN
Mexico	Felipe Borja	PRI	Morelos	Rosalina Mazari	PRI
Tabasco	César Francisco Burelo	PRD	Jalisco	Carlos Luis Meillón Johnston	PAN
Mexico	Manuel Cadena Morales	PRI	Tamaulipas	Edgardo Melhem Salinas	PRI
Sonora	Patricia Calles Villegas; Replacing Jose Luis León Perea	PRI	Mexico	Sandra Méndez Hernández	PRI
Chiapas	Mirna Camacho Pedrero	PAN	Veracruz	Alba Leonila Méndez	PAN
Chihuahua	Luis Carlos Campos Villegas	PRI	Federal District	Avelino Méndez Rangel	PRD
Chihuahua	Alejandro Cano Ricaud	PRI	Federal District	Eduardo Mendoza Arellano	PRD
Sonora	Teresita Caraveo; Replacing Rogelio Díaz Brown	PRI	San Luis Potosí	Sonia Mendoza Díaz	PAN
Federal District	Jaime Cárdenas Gracia	PT	Oaxaca	Emilio Mendoza Kaplan	PRI
Jalisco	Salvador Caro Cabrera	PT	Guanajuato	Ramón Merino Loo	PAN
Mexico	Guillermina Casique Vences	PRI	Puebla	María Isabel Merlo Talavera	PRI
Jalisco	Gumercindo Castellanos	PAN	Veracruz	Nely Miranda; Replacing Carolina Gudiño Corro	PRI
Yucatán	Martín Enrique Castillo Ruz	PRI	Nuevo León	Fermín Montes Cavazos	PRI
Baja California Sur	Víctor Manuel Castro Cosío	PRD	Puebla	Fernando Morales Martínez	PRI
Oaxaca	Sofía Castro Ríos	PRI	Colima	Leoncio Morán Sánchez	PAN
Nuevo León	Rogelio Cerda Pérez	PRI	Morelos	Francisco Moreno Merino	PRI
Veracruz	Patricio Chirinos del Ángel	PRI	Veracruz	Daniela Nadal Riquelme; Replacing Javier Duarte de Ochoa	PRI
Mexico	Emilio Chuayffet	PRI	Chiapas	Moisés Narváez Ochoa; Replacing Roberto Albores Gleason	PRI
Oaxaca	Elpidio Concha	PRI	Puebla	Juan Carlos Natale	PVEM
Sinaloa	Germán Contreras García	PRI	Federal District	César Nava Vázquez	PAN
Tabasco	José Córdova Hernández	PRI	Mexico	Alfonso Navarrete Prida	PRI
Mexico	Armando Corona Rivera	PRI	Federal District	Nazario Norberto Sánchez	PRI
Chiapas	Ovidio Cortázar Ramos	PAN	Chihuahua	Maurilio Ochoa	PRI
Baja California	Jesús Gerardo Cortez Mendoza	PAN	Guanajuato	Jaime Oliva Ramírez	PAN
Nayarit	Manuel Humberto Cota Jiménez	PRI	Mexico	Elvira Olivas; Replacing David Sánchez Guevara	PRI
Colima	Carlos Cruz Mendoza	PRI	Chiapas	Hernán Orantes López	PRI
Aguascalientes	Raúl Cuadra García	PAN	Baja California	Francisco Javier Orduño Valdez	PAN
Federal District	Gabriela Cuevas Barrón	PAN	Guanajuato	Leticia Orozco Torres	PVEM; PANAL
Jalisco	Juan José Cuevas García	PAN	Baja California	Miguel Antonio Osuna Millán	PAN
Campeche	Margarita Curmina Cervera; Replacing Oscar Román Rosas	PRI	Baja California	José Luis Ovando Patrón	PAN
Federal District	Esthela Damián Peralta	PRD	Campeche	Oznerol Pacheco Castro	PRI
Chiapas	Sami David David	PRI	Jalisco	José Trinidad Padilla	PRI
Oaxaca	Manuel de Esesarte	PRI	Hidalgo	Héctor Pedraza Olguín	PRI
Tabasco	María Estela de la Fuente	PRI	San Luis Potosí	César Octavio Pedroza Gaitán	PAN
Tabasco	Alejandro de la Fuente Godínez; Replacing Adán Augusto López Hernández	PRD	Mexico	Héctor Pedroza Jiménez	PRI
Federal District	Rosa María de la Garza	PAN	Veracruz	Aníbal Peralta Galicia; Replacing José Francisco Yunes Zorrilla	PRI
Coahuila	Lily Fabiola de la Rosa; Replacing Héctor Franco López	PRI	Chihuahua	Guadalupe Pérez Domínguez	PRI
Sonora	Ernesto de Lucas Hopkins	PRI	Oaxaca	Eviel Pérez Magaña	PRI
Federal District	Mario di Costanzo	PT	Chihuahua	María Antonieta Pérez Reyes	PAN
Veracruz	Norberta Díaz Azuara; Replacing Genaro Mejía de la Merced	PRI	Veracruz	María Isabel Pérez Santos	PRI
Oaxaca	Heliodoro Díaz Escarraga	PRI	Mexico	José Ignacio Pichardo Lechuga	PRI
Mexico	Raúl Domínguez Rex	PRI	Federal District	Laura Piña Olmedo	PVEM
Mexico	Estefanía Durán Ortíz; Replacing Sergio Mancilla Zayas	PRI	Sonora	Miguel Pompa Corella	PRI
Jalisco	Ana Estela Durán Rico	PRI	Baja California Sur	Silvia Puppo Gastélum; Replacing Marcos Covarrubias Villaseñor	PRD
Federal District	Luis Felipe Eguía	PRD	Federal District	María Quiñones Cornejo	PRI
Nuevo León	Felipe Enríquez Hernández	PRI	Guanajuato	Aranzazú Quintana; Replacing Juan Huerta Montero	PAN
San Luis Potosí	Juan Pablo Escobar Martínez	PAN	Veracruz	Sergio Lorenzo Quiroz	PRI
Jalisco	Alberto Esquer Gutiérrez	PAN	Tamaulipas	José Francisco Rábago	PRI
Hidalgo	Omar Fayad	PRI	Guerrero	Socorro Sofío Ramírez	PRD
Coahuila	Héctor Fernández Aguirre	PRI	Nuevo León	Camilo Ramírez Puente	PAN
Federal District	Gerardo Fernández Noroña	PT	Oaxaca	Héctor Pablo Ramírez Puga	PRI
Mexico	Fernando Ferreyra Olivares	PRI	Puebla	Francisco Ramos Montaño	PRI
Chihuahua	Jaime Flores Castañeda	PRI	Jalisco	Felipe Rangel Vargas	PAN
Sonora	Luz Mireya Franco; Replacing Manuel Ignacio Acosta Gutiérrez	PRI	Durango	Ricardo Rebollo Mendoza	PRI
Querétaro	Adriana Fuentes Cortés	PAN	Federal District	Roberto Rebollo Vivero	PRI
Guanajuato	Lucila Gallegos Camarena	PAN	Mexico	Rodrigo Reina Liceaga	PRI
San Luis Potosí	Sergio Gama Dufour	PAN	Federal District	Ezequiel Rétiz	PAN
Nayarit	Martha Elena García Gómez	PAN	Nayarit	Ivideliza Reyes	PAN
Michoacán	Martín García Avilés	PRD	Guanajuato	Martín Rico Jiménez	PAN
Michoacán	Celia García Ayala; Replacing Uriel López Paredes	PRD	Guerrero	Armando Ríos Piter	PRD
Durango	Óscar García Barrón	PRI	Querétaro	Reginaldo Rivera de la Torre	PRI
Veracruz	Leandro García Bringas	PAN	Federal District	Leticia Robles Colin	PRI
Oaxaca	Manuel García Corpus	PRI	Veracruz	Adela Robles Morales; Replacing Salvador Manzur Díaz	PRI
Tamaulipas	Laura García Dávila; Replacing Everardo Villarreal Salinas	PRI	Coahuila	Josefina Rodarte; Replacing Miguel Ángel Riquelme	PRI
Sinaloa	Miguel Ángel García Granados	PRI	Nuevo León	Alfredo Rodríguez Dávila	PAN
Quintana Roo	Luis García Silva; Replacing Rosario Ortiz Yeladaqui	PRI	Mexico	Omar Rodríguez Cisneros	PRI
Sinaloa	Diva Hadamira Gastélum	PRI	San Luis Potosí	Wendy Rodríguez Galarza	PAN
Guerrero	Rodolfina Gatica Garzón; Replacing Ángel Aguirre Herrera	PRD	Veracruz	Rafael Rodríguez González; Replacing Judith Vázquez Saut	PRI
Mexico	Octavio Germán Olivares	PAN	Morelos	Félix Rodríguez Sosa	PRI
Tamaulipas	Francisco Javier Gil Ortíz	PRI	Mexico	Francisco Rojas San Román	PRI
Jalisco	Clara Gómez Caro	PRI	Hidalgo	Jorge Rojo García de Alba	PRI
Chiapas	Ariel Gómez León	PRD	Hidalgo	Jorge Romero Romero	PRI
Jalisco	Joel González Díaz	PRI	Veracruz	Frida Rosas Peralta; Replacing Felipe Amadeo Flores Espinosa	PRI
Michoacán	José Alfredo González Díaz; Replacing Víctor Manuel Báez Ceja	PRD	Mexico	José Adán Rubí Salazar	PRI
Oaxaca	Jorge González Ilescas	PRI	Michoacán	Iridia Salazar; Replacing Alfonso Martínez Alcázar	PAN
Federal District	César Daniel González Madruga	PAN	Mexico	Fausto Saldaña del Moral	PRI
Federal District	José Antonio González Mata; Replacing Mauricio Toledo Gutiérrez	PRD	Guerrero	Cuauhtémoc Salgado	PRI
Puebla	José Alberto González Morales	PRI	Federal District	Rigoberto Salgado Vázquez	PRD
Coahuila	Diana Patricia González Soto; Replacing Ruben Moreira Valdez	PRI	Michoacán	Ricardo Sánchez Gálvez	PRI
Puebla	Janet González Tostado	PRI	Morelos	Jaime Sánchez Vélez	PRI
Yucatán	Daniel Jesús Granja Peniche; Replacing Rolando Zapata Bello	PRI	Veracruz	Fernando Santamaría Prieto	PAN
Nuevo León	Ildefonso Guajardo Villarreal	PRI	Federal District	Arturo Santana Alfaro	PRD
Nuevo León	Marcela Guerra Castillo	PRI	Federal District	Emilio Serrano Jiménez	Ind.
Federal District	Agustín Guerrero Castillo	PRD	Mexico	Blanca Soria Morales; Replacing Germán Cortéz Sandoval	PRI
Tamaulipas	Alejandro Guevara Cobos	PRI	Puebla	Leobardo Soto	PRI
Mexico	Héctor Guevara Ramírez	PRI	Mexico	José Luis Soto Oseguera	PRI
Sonora	Leonardo Guillén Medina	PAN	Hidalgo	Blanca Soto Plata; Replacing David Penchyna Grub	PRI
Jalisco	Olivia Guillén Padilla	PRI	Michoacán	Laura Margarita Suárez	PAN
Coahuila	Lilia Gutiérrez Burciaga; Replacing Melchor Sánchez de la Fuente	PRI	Jalisco	Ignacio Téllez	PAN
Guanajuato	Tomás Gutiérrez Ramírez	PAN	Chihuahua	Adriana Terrazas Porras	PRI
Chiapas	Sergio Ernesto Gutiérrez Villanueva	PRD	Sinaloa	Reyna Tirado Gálvez; Replacing Aarón Irízar López	PRI
Chiapas	Luis Hernández Cruz	PRD	Baja California	Sergio Tolento Hernández	PAN
Mexico	Elvia Hernández García	PRI	Mexico	José Alfredo Torres Huitrón	PRI
Mexico	Jorge Hernández Hernández	PRI	Michoacán	Marciano Torres Robledo	PRD
Jalisco	David Hernández Pérez	PRI	Michoacán	Arturo Torres Santos	PAN
Federal District	Héctor Hugo Hernández Rodríguez	PRD	Puebla	Ricardo Urzúa Rivera; Replacing Ardelio Vargas	PRI
Mexico	Héctor Hernández Silva	PRI	Mexico	Josué Valdés Huezo	PRI
Aguascalientes	David Hernández Vallín	PRI	Michoacán	José María Valencia Barajas	PRD
Zacatecas	Samuel Herrera Chávez	PRD	Federal District	Balfre Vargas Cortéz	PRD
Veracruz	Francisco Herrera Jiménez	PRI	Federal District	María Araceli Vázquez Camacho	PRD
Michoacán	Dina Herrera Soto	PRI	Mexico	Noé Martín Vázquez	PRI
Tamaulipas	Baltazar Hinojosa Ochoa	PRI	Mexico	José Luis Velasco	PRI
Nuevo León	Gregorio Hurtado	PAN	Mexico	Héctor Velasco Monroy	PRI
Quintana Roo	Susana Hurtado Vallejo; Replacing Roberto Borge Angulo	PRI	Michoacán	Emiliano Velázquez Esquivel	PRD
Mexico	Inocencio Ibarra Piña	PRI	Guanajuato	José Guadalupe Vera Hernández	PAN
Jalisco	José Luis Íñiguez Gámez	PAN	Zacatecas	Heladio Verver y Vargas	PRI
Puebla	María Izaguirre Francos	PRI	Yucatán	Liborio Vidal Aguilar	PVEM
Zacatecas	Ramón Jiménez Fuentes	PRD	Hidalgo	Ramón Ramírez Valtierra	PRI
Puebla	Juan Pablo Jiménez Concha	PRI	Hidalgo	Carolina Viggiano	PRI
Puebla	Blanca Estela Jiménez Hernández	PRI	Jalisco	Arturo Villaseñor; Replacing Francisco Javier Ramírez Acuña	PAN
Federal District	Ramón Jiménez López	PRD	Mexico	Eduardo Yáñez Montaño	PRI
Puebla	Francisco Jiménez Merino	PRI	Oaxaca	José Antonio Yglesias Arreola	PRI
Quintana Roo	Carlos Joaquín González	PRI	Tamaulipas	Cristabell Zamora	PRI
Puebla	Jorge Juraidini	PRI	Jalisco	Arturo Zamora Jiménez	PRI
Veracruz	Fidel Kuri Grajales	PRI	Chihuahua	Georgina Zapata Lucero; Replacing Héctor Murguía Lardizábal	PRI
Veracruz	Silvio Lagos Galindo	PRI	Mexico	Eduardo Zarzosa Sánchez	PRI
Sinaloa	Óscar Lara Aréchiga	PRI	Guanajuato	Sixto Zetina	PAN
Sinaloa	Óscar Lara Salazar	PRI	Sinaloa	Rolando Zubía Rivera	PRI
Mexico	Andrés Aguirre Romero	PRI	Guerrero	Alejandro Carabias Icaza	PVEM
San Luis Potosí	Delia Guerrero Coronado	PRI	Mexico	Amador Monroy Estrada	PRI
Coahuila	Francisco Saracho Navarro	PRI	Mexico	Miguel Ángel Terrón	PRI
Tlaxcala	Julián Velázquez y Llorente	PAN	Guerrero	Alicia Zamora Villalva	PRI

=== Plurinominal Deputies ===
State	Name	Party	State	Name	Party
Mexico	Guadalupe Acosta Naranjo	PRD	Campeche	Nelly Márquez Zapata	PAN
Chihuahua	Velia Aguilar Armendáriz	PAN	Mexico	José Ramón Martel López	PRI
Tlaxcala	Jaime Aguilar Álvarez; Replacing Beatriz Paredes Rangel	PRI	Nuevo León	Baltazar Martínez Montemayor	PAN
Morelos	Jaime Álvarez Cisneros	MC	Coahuila	Elsa Martínez Peña	PANAL
Guerrero	Miguel Álvarez Santamaría	PRI	Federal District	Ifigenia Martínez y Hernández	PT
Zacatecas	Claudia Anaya Mota	PRD	Mexico	Andrés Massieu Fernández	PRI
Guanajuato	Justino Arriaga Rojas	PAN	Coahuila	Tereso Medina Ramírez	PRI
Yucatán	Daniel Ávila Ruiz	PAN	Guerrero	Zeus Mendoza; Replacing Ilich Lozano	PRD
Federal District	Armando Báez Pinal	PRI	Oaxaca	María Mendoza Sánchez; Replacing Guillermo Zavaleta Rojas	PAN
Baja California	Alejandro Bahena Flores	PAN	Zacatecas	Luis Enrique Mercado	PAN
Sonora	Héctor Barraza Chávez; Replacing Jesús Zambrano Grijalva	PRD	Baja California Sur	Francisco Armando Meza Castro	PRD
Guerrero	Mario Alberto Becerra Pocoroba	PAN	Nuevo León	José Isabel Meza Elizondo; Replacing Reyes Tamez	PANAL
Mexico	Humberto Benítez Treviño	PRI	Veracruz	Silvia Monge Villalobos	PAN
Mexico	Martha Angélica Bernardino Rojas	PRD	Campeche	Yolanda Montalvo López	PAN
Puebla	Rosario Brindis Álvarez	PVEM	Federal District	Porfirio Muñoz Ledo	PT
Veracruz	Juan Nicolás Callejas Arroyo	PRI	Mexico	Jorge Alberto Muro; Replacing Adriana Hinojosa Céspedes	PAN
Sonora	Jesús Alberto Cano Vélez	PRI	Michoacán	Dolores Názares Jerónimo	PRD
Chihuahua	Margarita Cano; Replacing Javier Corral Jurado	PAN	Mexico	Armando Neyra Chávez	PRI
Nuevo León	Felipe de Jesús Cantú Rodríguez	PAN	Jalisco	Joann Novoa Mossberger	PAN
Oaxaca	Bélgica Carmona Cabrera	PRD	Mexico	María Teresa Ochoa Mejía	MC
Michoacán	Julio Castellanos Ramírez	PAN	Quintana Roo	Gustavo Ortega Joaquín	PAN
Federal District	Agustín Castilla Marroquín	PAN	Chihuahua	Graciela Ortíz González	PRI
Veracruz	Óscar Saúl Castillo Andrade	PAN	Chiapas	Federico Ovalle	PRD
Federal District	Laura Itzel Castillo	PT	Querétaro	Rafael Pacchiano Alamán	PVEM
Guerrero	Antonino Cayetano; Replacing Filemón Navarro	PRD	Jalisco	Ana Elia Paredes Arciga	PAN
Colima	Hilda Ceballos	PRI	Nayarit	María Parra Becerra	PAN
Guanajuato	Edgardo Chaire Chavero; Replacing Alejandra Reynoso Sánchez	PAN	Colima	Pedro Peralta Rivas	PAN
Jalisco	Alberto Cinta	PVEM	Federal District	Silvia Pérez Ceballos	PAN
Federal District	Víctor Hugo Círigo Vázquez	PVEM	Mexico	Carlos Alberto Pérez Cuevas	PAN
Nuevo León	Benjamín Clariond	PRI	Sonora	Marcos Pérez Esquer	PAN
Durango	Lorena Corona Valdés	PVEM	Baja California	Roberto Pérez de Alva	PANAL
Colima	Yulenny Cortés León	PAN	Mexico	María Elena Pérez de Tejada	PAN
Oaxaca	Juanita Arcelia Cruz	PRD	Nuevo León	Rodrigo Pérez-Alonso González	PVEM
Durango	Marcos Carlos Cruz Martínez; Replacing Guadalupe Silerio	PRD	Nayarit	Cora Cecilia Pinedo	PANAL
Nuevo León	Guillermo Cueva Sada; Replacing Kattia Garza Romo	PVEM	Baja California Sur	Gloria Porras Valles; Replacing Isaías González Cuevas	PRI
Durango	Yolanda de la Torre	PRI	Federal District	Leticia Quezada Contreras	PRD
Guanajuato	Gerardo de los Cobos Silva	PAN	Michoacán	Benigno Quezada Naranjo	PAN
Mexico	Alejandro del Mazo; Replacing Carolina García Cañón	PVEM	Sonora	Mariano Quihuis; Replacing Carlos Samuel Moreno Terán	PVEM
Sonora	María Dolores del Río	PAN	Zacatecas	Arturo Ramírez Bucio	PAN
Michoacán	Pavel Díaz Juárez; Replacing Carlos Torres Piña	PRD	Yucatán	Jorge Carlos Ramírez Marín	PRI
Yucatán	Rosa Adriana Díaz	PAN	Oaxaca	Narcedalia Ramírez	PRI
Puebla	Augusta Díaz de Rivera	PAN	Coahuila	Jesús Ramírez Rangel	PAN
Nayarit	María Hilaria Domínguez	PRI	Chiapas	Vladimir Ramos Cárdenas	PAN
Federal District	Alejandro Encinas Rodríguez	PRD	Zacatecas	Juan Carlos Regis Adame; Replacing José Narro Céspedes	PRD
Guerrero	Herón Escobar	PT	Mexico	Teresa Reyes Sahagún	PT
Federal District	Pablo Escudero Morales	PVEM	Aguascalientes	María Reynoso Femat	PAN
Michoacán	Fernando Espino Arévalo; Replacing Jeny de los Reyes Aguilar	PRI	Durango	Primitivo Ríos Vázquez; Replacing Anel Patricia Nava Pérez	PT
Chiapas	Olga Luz Espinosa	PRD	Sinaloa	Guadalupe Robles Medina	PAN
Chiapas	Francisco Espinosa Ramos	PT	Querétaro	Jesús Rodríguez Hernández	PRI
Durango	Laura Elena Estrada Rodríguez	PAN	San Luis Potosí	Domingo Rodríguez Martell	PRD
Querétaro	Carlos Ezeta Salcedo; Replacing Ivette Ezeta Salcedo	PVEM	Mexico	Francisco Rojas Gutiérrez	PRI
Mexico	Silvia Fernández Martínez; Replacing Luis Videgaray Caso	PRI	Chiapas	Ana María Rojas Ruiz	PRI
Veracruz	Víctor Félix Flores Morales	PRI	Sinaloa	Adolfo Rojo Montoya	PAN
Tabasco	Juan Gerardo Flores Ramírez	PVEM	Hidalgo	Gloria Romero León	PAN
Tamaulipas	Carlos Flores Rico	PRI	Guerrero	Florentina Rosario Morales	PRD
Oaxaca	Jorge Fernando Franco	PRI	San Luis Potosí	Salomón Rosas; Replacing Sara Montiel Solís	PRI
Baja California Sur	Víctor Manuel Galicia; Replacing Esthela Ponce Beltrán	PRI	Morelos	Fidel Rubí Huicochea; Replacing Jesús Giles Sánchez	PAN
Aguascalientes	Margarita Gallegos Soto	PRI	Yucatán	Eric Rubio Barthell	PRI
Oaxaca	Guadalupe García Almanza	MC	Guanajuato	Guillermo Ruiz de Teresa; Replacing Yulma Rocha Aguilar	PRI
Federal District	Marco Antonio García Ayala	PRI	Federal District	Claudia Ruiz Massieu	PRI
Mexico	Lizbeth García Coronado	PRD	Mexico	Caritina Sáenz; Replacing Raymundo Vargas Sáenz	PVEM
Chihuahua	Arturo García Portillo	PAN	San Luis Potosí	Francisco Javier Salazar Sáenz	PAN
Mexico	Alejandro Gertz Manero	MC	Tamaulipas	Norma Leticia Salazar Vázquez	PAN
Jalisco	María Gómez Villalovos; Replacing Rafael Yerena Zambrano	PRI	Veracruz	Julio Saldaña Morán	PAN
Jalisco	Gustavo González Hernández	PAN	Federal District	Ninfa Salinas Sada	PVEM
Tlaxcala	Sergio González Hernández	PAN	Mexico	Hilario Sánchez Cortés; Replacing Juventino Castro y Castro	PRD
Coahuila	Yolanda González Hernández	PRI	Guanajuato	Gerardo Sánchez García	PRI
Sinaloa	Valerio González Schcolnik; Replacing Manuel Clouthier Carrillo	PAN	Federal District	Hugo Sánchez Miranda	PAN
Aguascalientes	Nancy González Ulloa	PAN	Guanajuato	Norma Sánchez Romero	PAN
Mexico	Óscar González Yáñez	PT	Chiapas	César Augusto Santiago	PRI
Coahuila	Mary Telma Guajardo	PRD	Veracruz	Adriana Sarur	PVEM
Mexico	Juan José Guerra Abud	PVEM	Jalisco	María Scherman Leaño	PRI
Tamaulipas	Mercedes Guillén Vicente	PRI	Campeche	José Ignacio Seara Sierra	PAN
Federal District	Paz Gutiérrez Cortina	PAN	Mexico	Maricela Serrano Hernández	PRI
Federal District	Valdemar Gutiérrez Fragoso	PAN	Tamaulipas	Felipe Solís Acero	PRI
Puebla	María Guzmán Lozano; Replacing Pablo Rodríguez Regordosa	PAN	Veracruz	Bernardo Téllez Juárez	PAN
Federal District	Francisco Hernández Juárez	PRD	Veracruz	María Esther Terán Velázquez	PRI
Hidalgo	Paula Hernández Olmos	PRI	Mexico	María Torre Canales	PANAL
Mexico	Jorge Herrera Martínez; Replacing Diego Guerrero Rubio	PVEM	Chiapas	Obdulia Torres Abarca	PRD
Durango	Bonifacio Herrera	PAN	Sonora	Enrique Torres Delgado	PAN
Michoacán	José Manuel Hinojosa	PAN	Michoacán	Agustín Torres Ibarrola	PAN
Jalisco	Enrique Ibarra Pedroza	PT	Querétaro	María Marcela Torres Peimbert	PAN
Federal District	Teresa Incháustegui	PRD	San Luis Potosí	Enrique Octavio Trejo Azuara	PAN
Mexico	José Luis Jaime Correa	PRD	Sonora	Dora Trigueras	PAN
Tabasco	Pedro Jiménez León	MC	Tabasco	Georgina Trujillo Zentella	PRI
Federal District	Jorge Kahwagi	PANAL	Querétaro	Sandra Ugalde Basaldúa	PAN
Campeche	Víctor Manuel Kidnie	PRI	Federal District	Enoé Uranga	PRD
Mexico	José Francisco Landero	PAN	Guanajuato	Javier Usabiaga Arroyo	PAN
Tabasco	Rodolfo Lara Lagunas	PRD	Yucatán	María Yolanda Valencia Vales	PAN
Baja California	Eduardo Ledesma Romo	PVEM	Tabasco	Guadalupe Valenzuela Cabrales	PAN
Baja California	Humberto Lepe Lepe	PRI	Chiapas	Maricarmen Valls; Replacing Roberto Gil Zuarth	PAN
Federal District	Sebastián Lerdo de Tejada	PRI	Mexico	Jaime Arturo Vázquez Aguilar	PANAL
Sinaloa	Óscar Levín Coppel	PRI	Hidalgo	Canek Vázquez Góngora	PRI
Oaxaca	Margarita Liborio Arrazola	PRI	Nuevo León	Pedro Vázquez González	PT
Guerrero	Ana Luz Lobato	PRD	Baja California	Francisco Vega de Lamadrid	PAN
Tamaulipas	Cruz López Aguilar	PRI	Federal District	Karla Villarreal Benassini	PANAL
Federal District	Kenia López Rabadán	PAN	Sinaloa	Alfredo Villegas Arreola	PRI
Chiapas	Gloria Luna Ruiz	PAN	Coahuila	Tomasa Vives	PAN
Mexico	Feliciano Marín Díaz	PRD	Colima	Indira Vizcaíno Silva	PRD
Guerrero	Laura Arizmendi Campos	MC	Federal District	Josefina Vázquez Mota	PAN
Federal District	Patricia Jiménez Case	PRI	Baja California	Laura Ledesma Romo	PVEM

== Alternate Deputies ==
Name	Replacing:	Took office	Name	Replacing:	Took office
María Teresa Álvarez Vázquez	Martha Bernardino	30 April 2012	Jorge Luis Lara Aguilar	Juan Carlos López Fernández	8 March 2012
Luz Margarita Alba Contreras	José Guadalupe Vera	25 April 1012	Humberto Macías Romero	Oralia López Hernández	2 February 2010
Violeta Avilés Álvarez	Eviel Pérez Magaña	2 March 2010	Aarón Mastache	Alejandro Encinas	29 March 2012
María Báez Padilla	Omar Rodríguez Cisneros	30 April 2012	Salma Meza Manjarrez	Salvador Caro Cabrera	1 February 2012
María Gabriela Banda	Justino Arriaga Rojas	19 April 2012	Guadalupe Mondragón Cobos	Francisco Javier Landero	30 April 2012
Martha Patricia Bernal	Jesús Ricardo Enríquez Fuentes	30 April 2012	Xóchitl Montes de Oca	Carlos Bello Otero	26 April 2012
María Cabrera Muñoz	Tereso Medina	10 April 2012	Christian Nava Sánchez	Luis Félix Rodríguez Sosa	17 April 2012
Morelos Jaime Canseco Gómez	Rodolfo Torre Cantú	23 February 2010	Julián Nazar Morales	Ana María Rojas	16 February 2012
Adriana Castelán Macías	Fidel Kuri Grajales	25 March 2010	Florentina Ocegueda	Martha Elena García	17 April 2012
Maribel Chollet	Miguel Ángel García Granados	29 April 2010	Martín Palacios Calderón	Óscar González Yáñez	30 April 2012
Luciano Cornejo Barrera	Guadalupe Acosta Naranjo	1 February 2011	Fany Pérez Gutiérrez	Sergio González Hernández	2 February 2010
Alfredo Cuadra Tinajero	Camilo Ramírez Puente	26 April 2012	Elvira Pola Figueroa	Obdulia Torres Abarca	10 April 2012
Alín Nayely de Jesús Sánchez	Ezequiel Rétiz	13 March 2012	Malco Ramírez Martínez	Juan Carlos Lastiri	2 February 2010
Adolfo de la Garza Malacara	Felipe Enríquez Hernández	23 February 2012	Horacio Ramírez Reyes	Gloria Romero León	26 April 2011
Gerardo del Mazo Morales	Karla Villarreal Benassini	29 October 2009	Óscar Rangel Miravete	Fermín Alvarado Arroyo	30 April 2012
María Díaz de León	Raúl Cuadra García	4 February 2012	César Rodríguez Cal y Mayor	Gloria Luna Ruiz	30 April 2012
José Enríquez Rosado	Feliciano Marín Díaz	25 July 2012	Juanita Santillán	Raúl Domínguez Rex	6 October 2011
Omar Flores Majul	Esteban Albarrán Mendoza	17 April 2012	Víctor Silva Chacón	Graciela Ortiz González	12 October 2010
María Patricia Franco Cruz	Héctor Pedroza Jiménez	23 April 2012	Hazel Suárez Bastida	José Luis Velasco	30 April 2012
Noé Fernando Garza Flores	Hilda Esthela Flores	2 February 2012	Mayra Valdés González	Jesús Ramírez Rangel	2 February 2010
Fátima Gómez Montero	Humberto Cota Jiménez	14 February 2012	Carmen Valle Vea	Leonardo Guillén Medina	10 April 2012
María González Alvarado	Alfredo Lugo Oñate	26 April 2012	Marcela Vieyra Alamilla	Ramón Ramírez Valtierra	7 April 2011
Karla González Cruz	Julio Saldaña Morán	20 April 2010	Moisés Villanueva de la Luz	Socorro Sofío Ramírez	31 March 2011
Cuauhtémoc Gutiérrez de la Torre	Patricia Jiménez Case	2 February 2010	José Luis Villegas Méndez	Sixto Zetina	25 April 2012
Nazario Herrera Ortega	María Elena López Loyo	2 February 2010	María Elena Zamora	Erandi Bermúdez	25 April 2012
Prudencia Juárez Capilla	Julián Velázquez y Llorente	2 February 2010	María Zamudio Guzmán	Adolfo Rojo Montoya	30 April 2012

Preceded by 60th Congress	LXI Legislature; September 2009 to August 2012	Succeeded by 62nd Congress
