= Primitivo Ríos Vázquez =

Mexican politician

- Born: 10 June 1955 (age 70); Durango, Mexico
- Occupation: Politician
- Political party: PT

Alfonso Primitivo Ríos Vázquez (born 10 June 1955) is a Mexican politician from the Labor Party (PT).

Ríos Vázquez is a native of the state of Durango. He served in the Chamber of Deputies during the 56th Congress (1994–1997), as a plurinominal deputy, and in the 61st Congress (2009–2012), as the alternate of the plurinominal deputy Anel Patricia Nava Pérez.

He also served in the 58th and 61st sessions of the Congress of Durango (1989–1992 and 1998–2001) and as the alternate of Senator Marcos Carlos Cruz Martínez in 2003–2006.

He competed for Durango's 4th congressional district in the 2024 general election but placed second behind Patricia Jiménez Delgado of the National Action Party.
