= Juan Quiñones Ruiz =

Mexican politician

- Born: 28 February 1955 (age 71); Canatlán, Durango, Mexico
- Occupation: Senator
- Political party: MC

Juan Quiñones Ruiz (born 28 February 1955) is a Mexican politician affiliated with the PAN. As of 2013 he served as Senator of the LXI Legislature of the Mexican Congress representing Durango as replacement of Rodolfo Dorador.
