= Manjarrez =

Manjarrez is a Spanish surname.

== Notable people ==
- Deb Manjarrez, American politician
- Itzel Manjarrez, Mexican taekwondo practitioner
- Jorge Iván Estrada Manjarrez, Mexican footballer
- Juan Carlos Manjarrez, Mexican archer
- Salma Meza Manjarrez, Mexican politician

== See also ==
- Manjarrés
