= José Luis Lobato =

Mexican politician (1938–2014)

Jose Luis Lobato
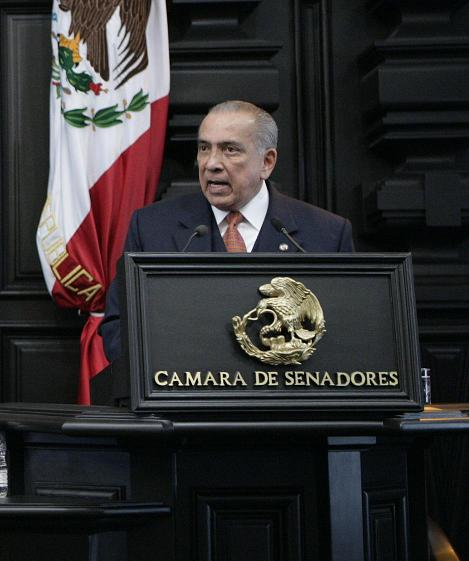

Senator of the Congress of the Union National List
- In office 1 September 2006 – 29 April 2010
- Succeeded by: Francisco García Lizardi

Personal details
- Born: 5 October 1938 Orizaba, Veracruz, Mexico
- Died: 17 October 2014 (aged 76) Xalapa, Veracruz, Mexico
- Party: MC
- Occupation: Senator

Jose Luis Lobato Campos (5 October 1938 – 17 October 2014) was a Mexican politician affiliated with the Convergence. He served as Senator of the LX and LXI Legislatures of the Mexican Congress representing Veracruz.

On October 17, 2014, Lobato and his wife, Olga Borguetti, were shot to death by Lobato's son, José Luis Lobato Calderón, who later attempted to commit suicide.
