= Julio César Aguirre Méndez =

Mexican politician

- Born: 14 September 1962 (age 63); Guerrero, Mexico
- Occupation: Senator
- Political party: PRD

Julio César Aguirre Méndez (born 14 September 1962) is a Mexican politician affiliated with the Party of the Democratic Revolution. As of 2014 he served as Senator of the LXI Legislature of the Mexican Congress of the Mexican Congress representing Guerrero as replacement of Lázaro Mazón Alonso.
