= Maria Cruz =

Maria Cruz or Marie Cruz may refer to:

- Maria de Lourdes Martins Cruz, East Timorese religious sister
- María Ruiz Cruz (born 1980), Spanish actress
- María Patricia Franco Cruz, Mexican politician
- María Carolina Santa Cruz, Argentine swimmer
- Sacheen Littlefeather (Marie Louise Cruz, 1946–2022), Native American activist
- Maria Elena Cruz, Arizona judge

== See also ==
- Mari Cruz Díaz (born 1969), Spanish race walker
- María Cruz González (born 1971), Spanish field hockey player
- María de la Cruz (1912–1995), Chilean political activist
