= Tomasa =

Tomasa is a Spanish female name. It may refer to:

== Art & media ==
- Tomasa Diego, lead character in Noh Matta Wat!
- Tomasa Tequiero, Venezuelan soap opera
- "La negra Tomasa", also known as "Bilongo", famous guaracha by Guillermo Rodríguez Fiffe

== People ==
- Roxana Tomasa Díaz Sánchez (b. 1981), Cuban athlete
- Tomasa Manalo, wife of Christian sect leader Felix Manalo
- María Tomasa Palafox, Marquise of Villafranca (1780–1835), Spanish aristocrat
- Tomasa Vives (b. 1959), Mexican politician

== See also ==
- Tomás (given name), masculine form of Tomasa
- Thomas (name)
