= Pedro León (disambiguation) =

Pedro León is Spanish footballer.

Pedro León may also refer to:

- Pedro León Gallo (1779–1852), Argentine statesman
- Pedro León Gallo Goyenechea (1830–1877), Chilean politician
- Pedro León Zapata (1929–2015), Venezuelan artist
- Pedro Pablo León (born 1943), Peruvian footballer
- Pedro María León-Páez y Brown (1835–1903), Costa Rican politician
- Pedro León Torres, Venezuelan independence hero
- Pedro Jiménez León (born 1958), Mexican politician
- Pedro Cieza de León (1520–1554), conquistador of Peru
- Pedro Ponce de León (1520–1584), Spanish monk
- Pedro León (baseball) (born 1998), Cuban baseball player
