= Laura García =

Laura García may refer to:

- Laura García Benítez (born 1981), Spanish Paralympic judoka
- Laura García Dávila (born 1968), Mexican politician
- Laura Garcia Martinez (born 1991), Spanish trampolinist at the 2010 Trampoline World Championships
- Laura García-Caro (born 1995), Spanish racewalker
- Laura García-Godoy, Dominican Republic actress
- Laura Gallego García (born 1977), Spanish author
