= Malco =

Malco may refer to:

== People ==
- Paolo Malco (born 1947), Italian film actor
- Romany Malco (born 1968), American actor, voice actor, and music producer
- Malco Ramírez Martínez (born 1970), Mexican politician

== Theatres ==
- Malco Theatre, a historic movie theater in Hot Springs, Arkansas
- Malco Theatres, a fourth generation movie theatre chain

== See also ==
- Malko (flourished 1740-1760), earliest king of Garo Kingdom in India
- Nicolai Malko (1883–1961), Ukrainian-Australian symphonic conductor
