= Rafael Yerena Zambrano =

Mexican politician (born 1950)

- Born: 9 October 1950 (age 75); Mascota, Jalisco
- Occupation: Politician
- Political party: PRI y Movimiento Ciudadano

Rafael Yerena Zambrano (born 9 October 1950) is a Mexican politician affiliated with the PRI. He represented Jalisco and the first electoral region in the Chamber of Deputies for the LXIII Legislature of the Mexican Congress.

== Life ==
Yerena broke into politics in Puerto Vallarta, where at the age of 15, he became the secretary general of Section 92 of the Union of Workers in the Hotel and Restaurant Industry of Jalisco. Between 1977 and 1979, and again from 1983 to 1985, Yerena sat on the city council of Puerto Vallarta; during this time, he also obtained a degree in private accounting.

In 1992, Yerena began a two-year stint as the secretary of government of Puerto Vallarta and additionally became the secretary general of the Federation of Workers of the North Coast of Jalisco; from 1994 to 1995, he was the substitute municipal president, replacing Rodolfo González Macías.

Yerena's political career came back to life in 2004, when he became the secretary general of the Federation of Workers of Jalisco; he was re-elected unopposed to two more six-year terms heading the FTJ in 2010 and again in 2016, ensuring his position until 2022. He also represented the Confederation of Mexican Workers, where he was once the state-level secretaries general, on the Council of the National Assembly of INFONAVIT, and was an unused alternate senator in the LX Legislature.

In 2009, the PRI sent Yerena to the Chamber of Deputies for the LXI Legislature. He sat on commissions dealing with social security, labor and social welfare, and tourism. He was also an alternate senator who was called into action on April 19, 2012, when Ramiro Hernández García left the Senate to run for Municipal President of Guadalajara. In addition, Yerena continued to be active in the CTM and PRI; he was the substitute secretary general of the national CTM between 2010 and 2016, and in 2016, he became the secretary of organization for the PRI in Puerto Vallarta.

In 2015, the PRI yet again placed Yerena on its list, for the LXIII Legislature. He served as a secretary on the Labor and Social Welfare Commission and also served on those dealing with tourism and housing.
