= Silerio =

Silerio is a surname. Notable people with the surname include:

- Guadalupe Silerio (born 1971), Mexican politician
- Maximiliano Silerio Esparza (born 1939), Mexican politician
