= Patricia Jiménez =

Patricia Jiménez may refer to:

- Patricia Jiménez Case (born 1963), Mexican politician (PRI)
- Patricia Jiménez Delgado (born 1963), Mexican politician (PAN)
- Patricia Jiménez, beauty queen from the Dominican Republic, competed in Miss Universe 1988

Giménez:

- Patricia Giménez (born 1962), Argentine politician (UCR), contended in the 2017 Argentine legislative election
