= María Báez Padilla =

Mexican politician

María del Pilar Báez Padilla
- Born: 12 October 1973 (age 52); State of Mexico, Mexico
- Occupation: Politician
- Political party: PRI

María del Pilar Báez Padilla (born 12 October 1973) is a Mexican politician from the Institutional Revolutionary Party. In 2012 she served as Deputy of the LXI Legislature of the Mexican Congress representing the State of Mexico.
