= Joann Novoa Mossberger =

Mexican politician (born 1961)

- Born: 13 March 1961 (age 65); Jalisco, Mexico
- Occupation: Politician
- Political party: PAN

María Joann Novoa Mossberger (born 13 April 1961) is a Mexican politician from the National Action Party. From 2009 to 2012 she served as Deputy of the LXI Legislature of the Mexican Congress representing Jalisco.
