= José Isabel Meza Elizondo =

Mexican politician (born 1957)

- Born: 29 April 1957 (age 69); Nuevo León, Mexico
- Occupation: Politician
- Political party: PANAL

José Isabel Meza Elizondo (born 29 April 1957) is a Mexican politician from the New Alliance Party. From 2011 to 2012 he served as Deputy of the LXI Legislature of the Mexican Congress representing Nuevo León.
