= Josefina Rodarte =

Mexican politician

- Born: 1 September 1962 (age 63); Torreón, Coahuila, Mexico
- Occupation: Politician
- Political party: PRI

Josefina Rodarte (born 1 September 1962) is a Mexican politician from the Institutional Revolutionary Party. From 2011 to 2012 she served as Deputy of the LXI Legislature of the Mexican Congress representing Coahuila.
