= Margarita Villaescusa Rojo =

Mexican politician

- Born: 14 October 1964 (age 61); Culiacán, Sinaloa, Mexico
- Occupation: Senator
- Political party: PRI

Margarita Villaescusa Rojo (born 14 October 1964) is a Mexican politician affiliated with the PRI. As of 2013 she served as Senator of the LXI Legislature of the Mexican Congress representing Sinaloa as replacement of Mario López Valdez.
