= María Teresa Ochoa Mejía =

Mexican politician

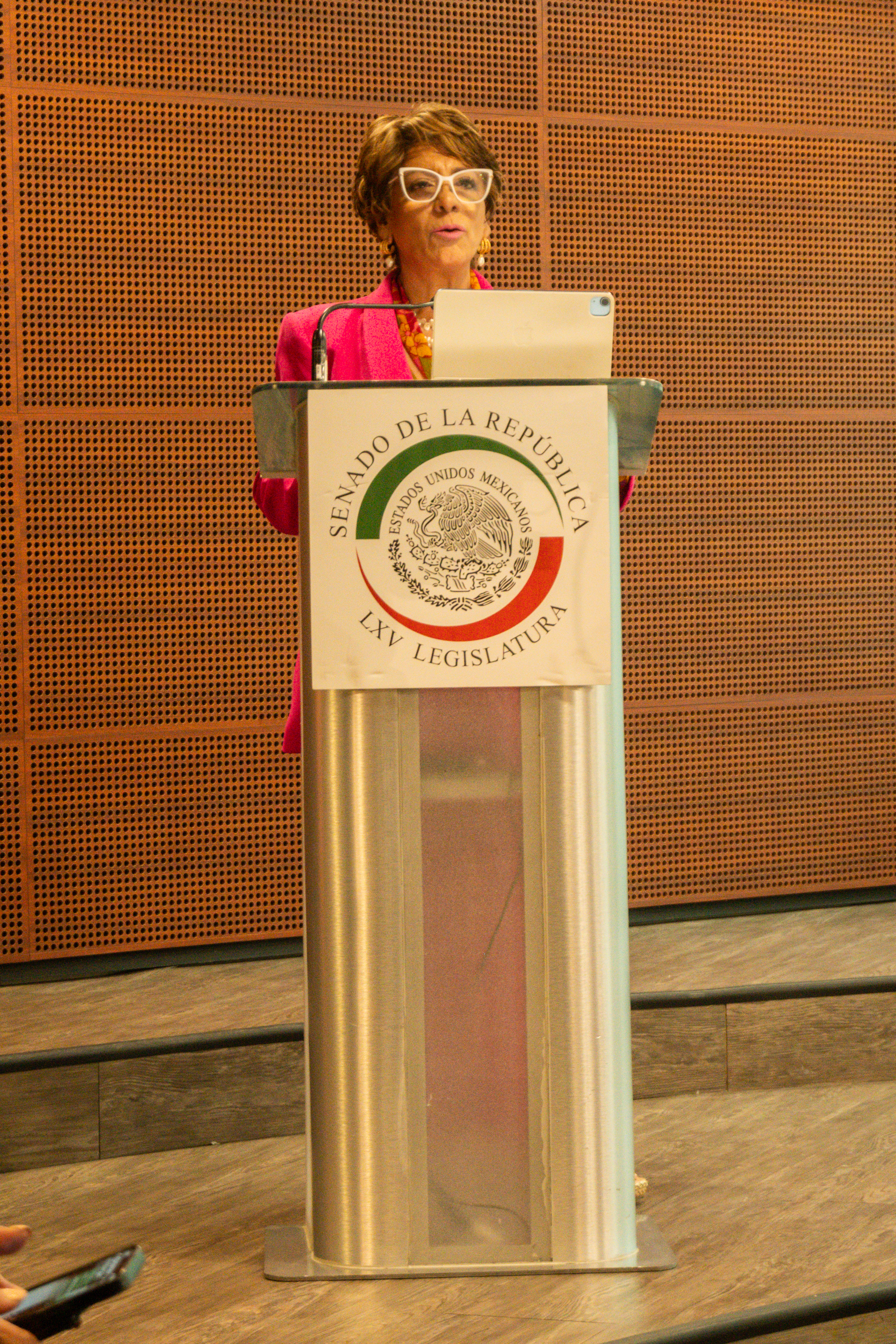
- Born: 14 October 1954 (age 71); State of Mexico, Mexico
- Occupation: Politician
- Political party: MC

María Teresa Rosaura Ochoa Mejía (born 14 October 1954) is a Mexican politician from the Citizens' Movement. From 2009 to 2012 she served as Deputy of the LXI Legislature of the Mexican Congress representing the State of Mexico.
