= Augusta Díaz de Rivera =

Mexican politician

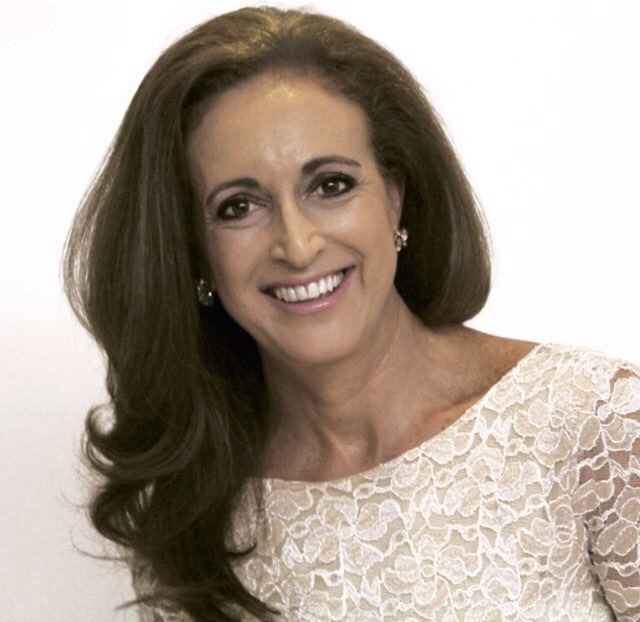

Personal details
- Born: 10 January 1961 (age 65) Puebla, Puebla, Mexico
- Party: PAN
- Occupation: Politician

Augusta Valentina Díaz de Rivera Hernández (born 10 January 1961) is a Mexican politician from the National Action Party. From 2009 to 2012 she served as Federal Deputy of the LXI Legislature of the Mexican Congress representing Puebla.
