= Víctor Manuel Galicia =

Mexican politician

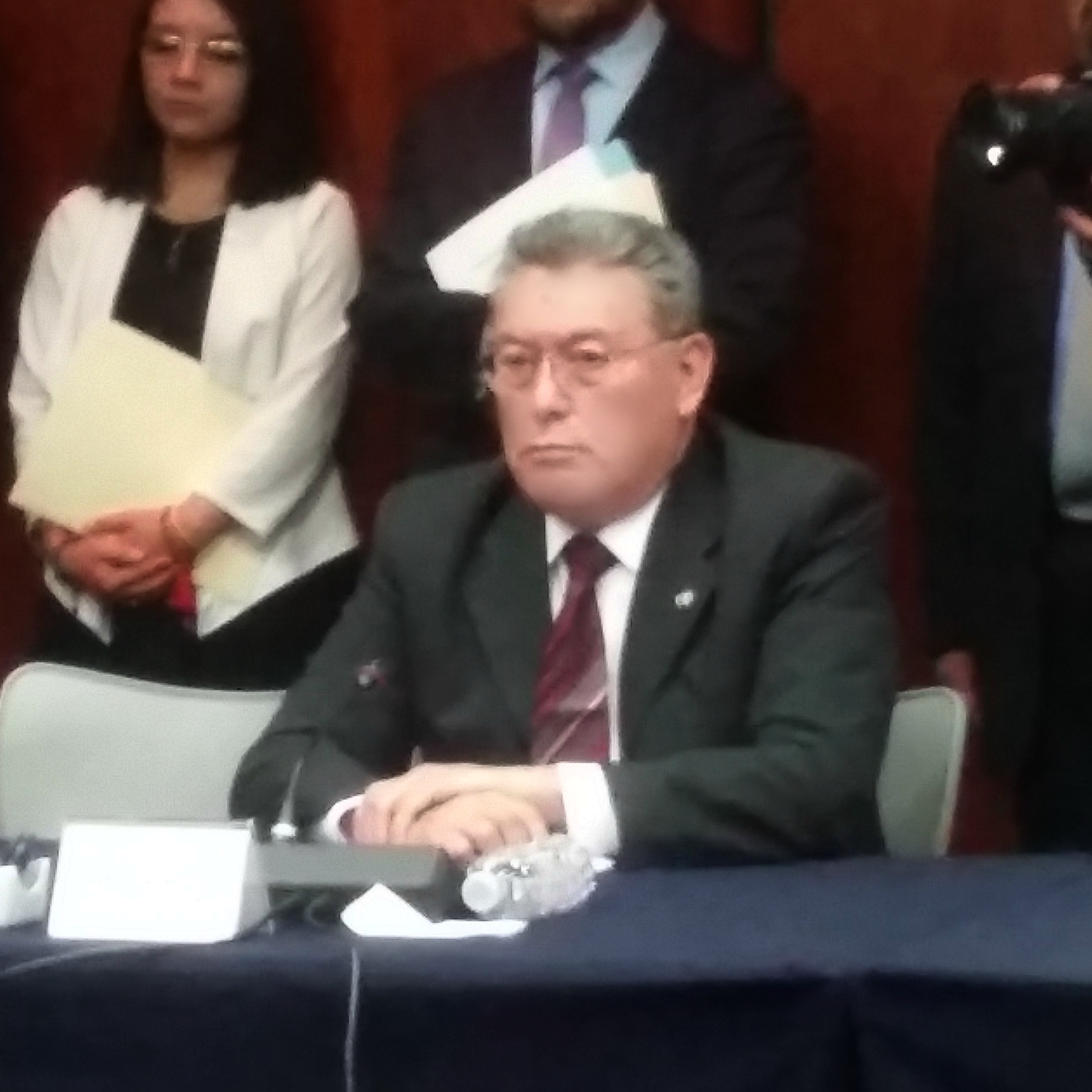
- Born: April 15, 1952 (age 74); Xochimilco, Mexico
- Occupation: Politician
- Political party: PRI
- Spouse: Yolanda Trejo Noriega

Víctor Manuel Anastasio Galicia Ávila (born 15 April 1952) is a Mexican politician from the Institutional Revolutionary Party (PRI). From 2010 to 2012 he served as Deputy of the LXI Legislature of the Mexican Congress representing Baja California Sur.

Galicia Ávila graduated as an architect from the International Schools of Latin America. He worked as Chief of Cartography and Plans of the Agrarian Reform Secretariat in Mexico City from 1981 to 1983. In 1987 he served as Head of the Department of Higher Organizations of the Agrarian Reform Secretariat of Mexico City. In 1989 he was Chief of Agroexports of the Secretary of Agriculture and Hydraulic Resources in Mexico City, and in 1994 he was elected State Delegate of the National Commission of Integral Development and Social Justice for the Indigenous Peoples of Ensenada, Baja California. In 1998 he was elected proprietary counselor of the Rural Credit Bank of the Northwest.

He has served as Delegate of the National Executive Committee of the Institutional Revolutionary Party in the State of Baja California Sur; Delegate of the National Executive Committee of the National Peasant Confederation in the States of Oaxaca, State of Mexico, and Campeche.

He is currently Secretary of Fisheries and Aquaculture of the National Executive Committee of the National Peasant Confederation.

Víctor Manuel Galicia Ávila took protest as senator of the LXIII Legislature in February 2018.
