= Caritina Sáenz =

Mexican politician

- Born: 8 August 1963 (age 62); State of Mexico, Mexico
- Occupation: Politician
- Political party: Institutional Revolutionary Party

Caritina Sáenz Vargas (born 8 August 1963) is a Mexican politician from the Institutional Revolutionary Party. From 2010 to 2012 she served as Deputy of the LXI Legislature of the Mexican Congress representing the State of Mexico.
