= Norma Sánchez Romero =

Mexican politician

- Born: 13 August 1956 (age 69); Leon, Guanajuato, Mexico
- Occupation: Politician
- Political party: PAN

Norma Sánchez Romero (born 13 August 1956) is a Mexican politician from the National Action Party. From 2009 to 2012 she served as Deputy of the LXI Legislature of the Mexican Congress representing Guanajuato.
