= Óscar Saúl Castillo Andrade =

Mexican politician

- Born: 21 January 1966 (age 60); Veracruz, Mexico
- Occupation: Politician
- Political party: PAN

Óscar Saúl Castillo Andrade (born 21 January 1966) is a Mexican politician from the National Action Party. From 2009 to 2012 he served as Deputy of the LXI Legislature of the Mexican Congress representing Veracruz.
