= Eduardo Ledesma Romo =

Mexican politician

- Born: 20 April 1969 (age 57); Tijuana, Baja California, Mexico
- Occupation: Politician
- Political party: PVEM

Eduardo Ledesma Romo (born 20 April 1969) is a Mexican politician from the Ecologist Green Party of Mexico. From 2009 to 2012 he served as Deputy of the LXI Legislature of the Mexican Congress representing Baja California.
