= María Esther Terán Velázquez =

Mexican politician

- Born: 29 November 1952 (age 73); Veracruz, Mexico
- Occupation: Politician
- Political party: PRI

María Esther Terán Velázquez (born 29 November 1952) is a Mexican politician from the Institutional Revolutionary Party. From 2009 to 2012 she served as Deputy of the LXI Legislature of the Mexican Congress representing Veracruz.
