= Blanca Soto Plata =

Mexican politician (born 1951)

- Born: 14 September 1951 (age 74); Hidalgo, Mexico
- Occupation: Politician
- Political party: PRI

Blanca Luz Purificación Dalila Soto Plata (born 14 September 1951) is a Mexican politician from the Institutional Revolutionary Party. In 2012 she served as Deputy of the LXI Legislature of the Mexican Congress representing Hidalgo.
