= Luz Mireya Franco =

Mexican politician

- Born: 30 October 1960 (age 65); Sonora, Mexico
- Occupation: Politician
- Political party: PRI

Luz Mireya Franco Hernández (born 30 October 1960) is a Mexican politician from the Institutional Revolutionary Party. From 2009 to 2012 she served as Deputy of the LXI Legislature of the Mexican Congress representing Sonora.
