= Lizbeth García Coronado =

Mexican politician (born 1988)

- Born: 9 May 1988 (age 38); State of Mexico, Mexico
- Occupation: Politician
- Political party: PRD

Lizbeth García Coronado (born 9 May 1988) is a Mexican politician from the Party of the Democratic Revolution. From 2009 to 2012 she served as Deputy of the LXI Legislature of the Mexican Congress representing the State of Mexico.
