= Armando Báez Pinal =

Mexican politician

- Born: 30 September 1961 (age 64); Mexico City, Mexico
- Occupation: Politician
- Political party: PRI

Armando Jesús Baez Pinal (born 30 September 1961) is a Mexican politician from the Institutional Revolutionary Party. From 2009 to 2012 he served as Deputy of the LXI Legislature of the Mexican Congress representing the Federal District.

He is one of the 100 Constitutional Deputies that are writing the Constitution of Mexico City. And member of CTM as Secretary of Culture.
