= María Gabriela Banda =

Mexican politician (born 1969)

- Born: 16 November 1969 (age 56); Guanajuato, Mexico
- Occupation: Politician
- Political party: PAN

María Gabriela Banda López (born 16 November 1969) is a Mexican politician from the National Action Party. In 2012 she served as Deputy of the LXI Legislature of the Mexican Congress representing Guanajuato.
