= José Manuel Hinojosa =

Mexican politician

- Born: 20 May 1982 (age 44); Sahuayo, Michoacán, Mexico
- Occupation: Politician
- Political party: PAN

José Manuel Hinojosa Pérez (born 20 May 1982) is a Mexican politician from the National Action Party. From 2009 to 2012 he served as Deputy of the LXI Legislature of the Mexican Congress representing Michoacán.
