= Edgardo Chaire Chavero =

Mexican politician (born 1977)

- Born: 18 April 1977 (age 49); Victoria, Guanajuato, Mexico
- Occupation: Politician
- Political party: PAN

Edgardo Chaire Chavero (born 18 April 1977) is a Mexican politician from the National Action Party. From 2011 to 2012 he served as Deputy of the LXI Legislature of the Mexican Congress representing Guanajuato.
