= Eugenio Govea Arcos =

Mexican politician

- Born: 22 March 1966 (age 60); San Luis Potosí, Mexico
- Occupation: Senator
- Political party: MC

Eugenio Guadalupe Govea Arcos (born 22 March 1966) is a Mexican politician affiliated with the Convergence. As of 2013 he served as Senator of the LX and LXI Legislatures of the Mexican Congress representing San Luis Potosí.
