= María González Alvarado =

Mexican politician

- Born: 3 January 1966 (age 60); Querétaro, Mexico
- Occupation: Politician
- Political party: PRI

María Genoveva Anavel González Alvarado (born 3 January 1966) is a Mexican politician from the Institutional Revolutionary Party. In 2012 she served as Deputy of the LXI Legislature of the Mexican Congress representing Querétaro.
