= María Díaz de León =

Mexican politician

- Born: 15 February 1962 (age 64); Aguascalientes, Mexico
- Occupation: Politician
- Political party: PAN

María Matilde Maricel Díaz de León Macías (born 15 February 1962) is a Mexican politician from the National Action Party. In 2012 she served as Deputy of the LXI Legislature of the Mexican Congress representing Aguascalientes.
