= Zeus Mendoza =

Mexican politician

- Born: 23 October 1982 (age 43); Morelos, Mexico
- Occupation: Politician
- Political party: PRD

Zeus Rafael Mendoza Flores (born 23 October 1982) is a Mexican politician from the Party of the Democratic Revolution. In 2012 he served as Deputy of the LXI Legislature of the Mexican Congress representing Morelos.
