= Luz Margarita Alba Contreras =

Mexican politician (born 1979)

- Born: 18 October 1979 (age 46); Guanajuato, Mexico
- Occupation: Politician
- Political party: PAN

Luz Margarita Alba Contreras (born 18 October 1979) is a Mexican politician from the National Action Party. In 2012 she served as Deputy of the LXI Legislature of the Mexican Congress representing Guanajuato.
