= Jaime Arturo Vázquez Aguilar =

Mexican politician

- Born: 7 May 1975 (age 51); State of Mexico, Mexico
- Occupation: Politician
- Political party: PANAL (1990s–2010)

Jaime Arturo Vázquez Aguilar (born 7 May 1975) is a Mexican politician formerly from the New Alliance Party. From 2009 to 2012 he served as Deputy of the LXI Legislature of the Mexican Congress representing the State of Mexico.
