= Jorge Alberto Muro =

Mexican politician (born 1973)

- Born: 25 May 1973 (age 52); State of Mexico, Mexico
- Occupation: Politician
- Political party: PAN

Jorge Alberto Muro Ortiz (born 25 May 1973) is a Mexican politician from the National Action Party. In 2012 he served as Deputy of the LXI Legislature of the Mexican Congress representing the State of Mexico.
