= Paz Gutiérrez Cortina =

Mexican politician

- Born: 24 February 1947 (age 79); Mexico City, Mexico
- Occupation: Politician
- Political party: PAN

Paz Gutiérrez Cortina (born 24 February 1947) is a Mexican politician from the National Action Party. From 2009 to 2012 she served as Deputy of the LXI Legislature of the Mexican Congress representing the Federal District.
