= Gerardo del Mazo Morales =

Mexican politician

- Born: 29 November 1976 (age 49); Mexico City, Mexico
- Occupation: Politician
- Political party: PANAL

Gerardo del Mazo Morales (born 29 November 1976) is a Mexican politician from the New Alliance Party. From 2009 to 2012 he served as Deputy of the LXI Legislature of the Mexican Congress representing the Federal District.
