= Enrique Torres Delgado =

Mexican politician

- Born: 6 February 1959 (age 67); Magdalena de Kino, Sonora, Mexico
- Occupation: Politician
- Political party: PAN

Enrique Torres Delgado (born 6 February 1959) is a Mexican politician from the National Action Party. From 2009 to 2012 he served as Deputy of the LXI Legislature of the Mexican Congress representing Sonora, having previously served in the LVI Legislature of the Congress of Sonora.
