= Norma Leticia Salazar Vázquez =

Mexican politician

- Born: 6 August 1977 (age 48); Matamoros, Tamaulipas, Mexico
- Occupation: Politician
- Political party: PAN

Norma Leticia Salazar Vázquez (born 6 August 1977) is a Mexican politician from the National Action Party. From 2009 to 2012 she served as Deputy of the LXI Legislature of the Mexican Congress representing Tamaulipas. She served as the mayor of Matamoros, Tamaulipas from 2013 until 2016.
