= Carlos Samuel Moreno Terán =

Mexican politician

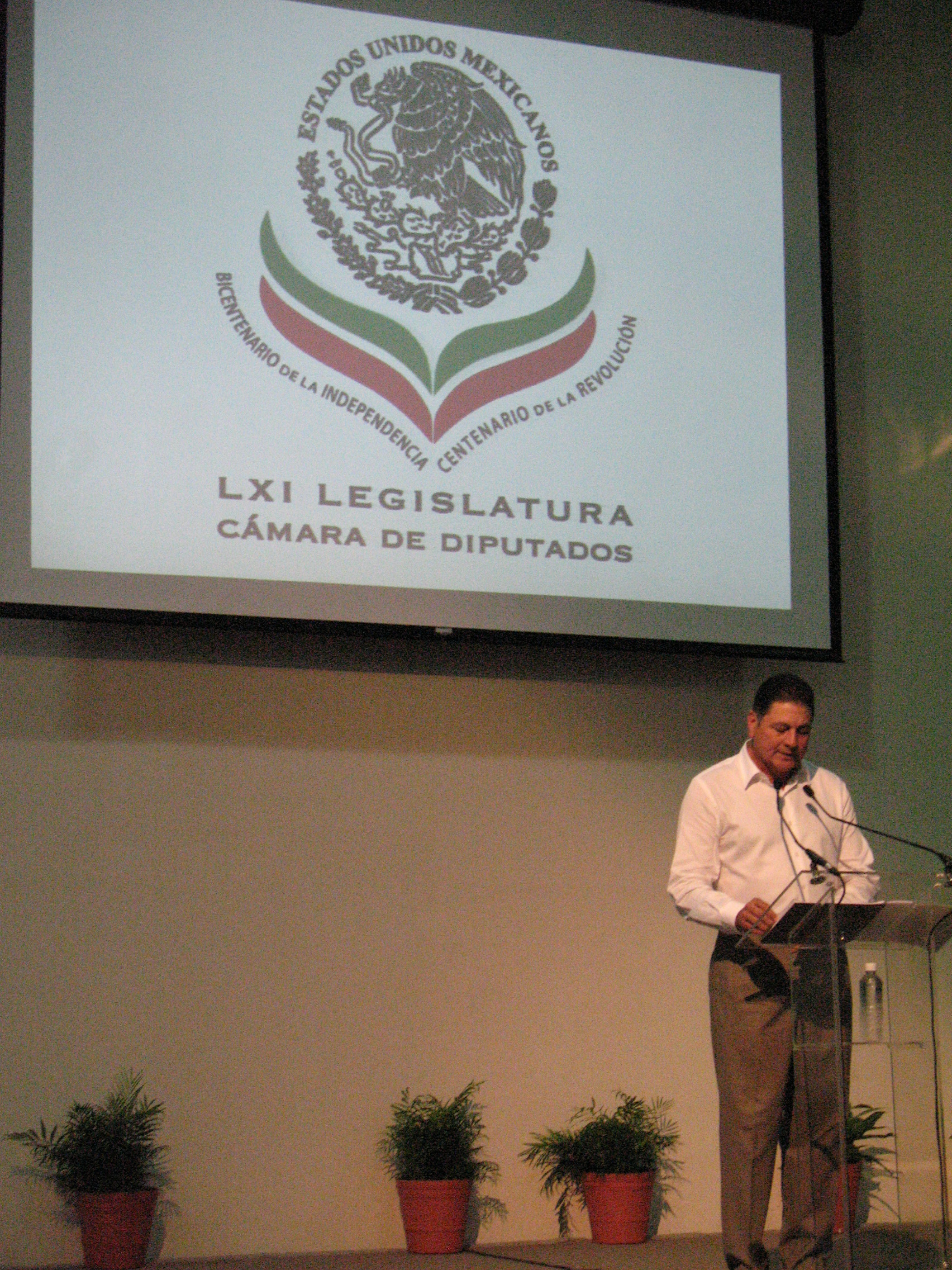
- Born: 4 November 1962 (age 63); Cananea, Sonora, Mexico
- Education: Universidad de Sonora
- Occupation: Politician
- Political party: PVEM

Carlos Samuel Moreno Terán (born 4 November 1962) is a Mexican politician from the Ecologist Green Party of Mexico. From 2009 to 2012 he served as Deputy of the LXI Legislature of the Mexican Congress representing Sonora, and previously served as a local deputy in the LVII Legislature of the Congress of Sonora.
