= Valerio González Schcolnik =

Mexican politician

- Born: 11 April 1967 (age 59); Sinaloa, Mexico
- Occupation: Politician
- Political party: PAN

Valerio González Schcolnik (born 11 April 1967) is a Mexican politician from the National Action Party. In 2012 he served as Deputy of the LXI Legislature of the Mexican Congress representing Sinaloa.
