= Víctor Silva Chacón =

Mexican politician

- Born: 29 January 1959 (age 67); Riva Palacio, Chihuahua, Mexico
- Occupation: Politician
- Political party: PRI

Víctor Roberto Silva Chacón (born 29 January 1959) is a Mexican politician from the Institutional Revolutionary Party. From 2010 to 2012 he served as Deputy of the LXI Legislature of the Mexican Congress representing Chihuahua.
