= María Parra Becerra =

Mexican politician

- Born: 8 May 1967 (age 59); Ixtlán del Río, Nayarit, Mexico
- Occupation: Politician
- Political party: PAN

María Felícitas Parra Becerra (born 8 May 1967) is a Mexican politician from the National Action Party. From 2009 to 2012 she served as Deputy of the LXI Legislature of the Mexican Congress representing Nayarit.
