= Raymundo Vargas Sáenz =

Mexican politician

- Born: 15 September 1987 (age 38); State of Mexico, Mexico
- Occupation: Politician
- Political party: PVEM

Álvaro Raymundo Vargas Sáenz (born 15 September 1987) is a Mexican politician from the Ecologist Green Party of Mexico. From 2009 to 2010 he served as Deputy of the LXI Legislature of the Mexican Congress representing the State of Mexico.
