= Carlos Ezeta Salcedo =

Mexican politician

- Born: 19 September 1970 (age 55); Querétaro, Mexico
- Occupation: Politician
- Political party: PVEM
- Family: Ivette Ezeta Salcedo (sister)

Carlos Alberto Ezeta Salcedo (born 19 September 1970) is a Mexican politician from the Ecologist Green Party of Mexico. From 2010 to 2012 he served as Deputy of the LXI Legislature of the Mexican Congress representing Querétaro.
