= Domingo Rodríguez Martell =

Mexican politician

- Born: 1 August 1965 (age 60); Tamazunchale, San Luis Potosí, Mexico
- Occupation: Politician
- Political party: PRD

Domingo Rodríguez Martell (born 1 August 1965) is a Mexican politician from the Party of the Democratic Revolution. From 2009 to 2012 he served as Deputy of the LXI Legislature of the Mexican Congress representing San Luis Potosí. He was previously the municipal president of Tanlajás from 1997 to 2000.
