= Xóchitl Montes de Oca =

Mexican politician

- Born: 27 December 1971 (age 54); State of Mexico, Mexico
- Occupation: Politician
- Political party: PAN

Xóchitl Montes de Oca Rodríguez (born 27 December 1971) is a Mexican politician from the National Action Party. In 2012 she served as Deputy of the LXI Legislature of the Mexican Congress representing the State of Mexico.
