= Guadalupe Robles Medina =

Mexican politician

- Born: 9 June 1959 (age 66); Mocorito, Sinaloa, Mexico
- Occupation: Politician
- Political party: PAN

Guadalupe Eduardo Robles Medina (born 9 June 1959) is a Mexican politician from the National Action Party. From 2009 to 2012 he served as Deputy of the LXI Legislature of the Mexican Congress representing Sinaloa.
