= Carlos Sotelo García =

Mexican politician

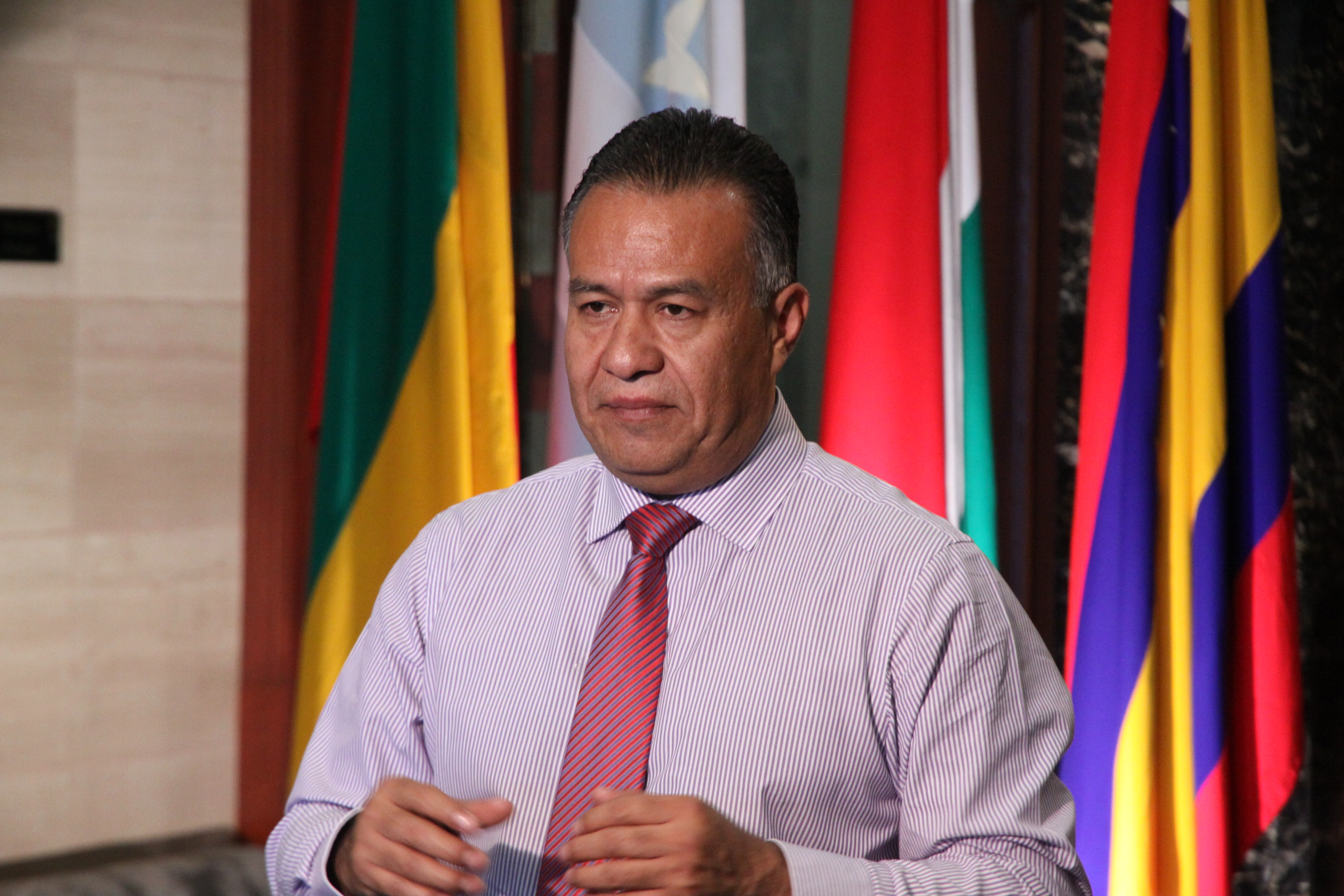
- Born: 8 October 1961 (age 64); Ixtapan de la Sal, State of Mexico, Mexico
- Occupation: Senator
- Political party: PRD

Carlos Sotelo García (born 8 October 1961) is a Mexican politician affiliated with the PRD. He served as Senator of the LX and LXI Legislatures of the Mexican Congress representing Colima, and previously served as a local deputy in the L Legislature of the Congress of Colima.
