= Kattia Garza Romo =

Mexican politician (born 1979)

- Born: 23 November 1979 (age 46); Nuevo León, Mexico
- Occupation: Politician
- Political party: PVEM

Kattia Garza Romo (born 23 November 1979) is a Mexican politician from the Ecologist Green Party of Mexico. In 2009 she served as Deputy of the LXI Legislature of the Mexican Congress representing Nuevo León.
