= María Cabrera Muñoz =

Mexican politician

- Born: 7 May 1952 (age 74); Coahuila, Mexico
- Occupation: Politician
- Political party: PRI

María Dolores Patricia Cabrera Muñoz (born 7 May 1952) is a Mexican politician from the Institutional Revolutionary Party. In 2012 she served as Deputy of the LXI Legislature of the Mexican Congress representing Coahuila.
