= Nancy González Ulloa =

Mexican politician

- Born: 23 September 1977 (age 48); Aguascalientes, Mexico
- Occupation: Politician
- Political party: PAN

Nancy González Ulloa (born 23 September 1977) is a Mexican politician from the National Action Party. From 2009 to 2012 she served as Deputy of the LXI Legislature of the Mexican Congress representing Aguascalientes.
