= María Zamudio Guzmán =

Mexican politician

- Born: 18 December 1961 (age 64); Sinaloa, Mexico
- Occupation: Politician
- Political party: PAN

María Zamudio Guzmán (born 18 December 1961) is a Mexican politician from the National Action Party. In 2012, she served as a Deputy of the LXI Legislature of the Mexican Congress representing Sinaloa.
