= Adolfo Rojo Montoya =

Mexican politician

- Born: 6 October 1965 (age 60); Guamúchil, Sinaloa, Mexico
- Occupation: Politician
- Political party: PAN

Adolfo Rojo Montoya (born 6 October 1965) is a Mexican politician from the National Action Party. From 2009 to 2012 he served as Deputy of the LXI Legislature of the Mexican Congress representing Sinaloa. He previously served as municipal president of Salvador Alvarado from 2002 to 2004.
