= Diego Guerrero Rubio =

Mexican politician

- Born: 26 October 1985 (age 40); State of Mexico, Mexico
- Occupation: Politician
- Political party: PVEM

Diego Guerrero Rubio (born 26 October 1985) is a Mexican politician from the Ecologist Green Party of Mexico. From 2009 to 2011 he served as Deputy of the LXI Legislature of the Mexican Congress representing the State of Mexico.
