= Arturo García Portillo =

Mexican politician (born 1966)

- Born: 22 November 1966 (age 59); Parral, Chihuahua, Mexico
- Occupation: Politician
- Political party: PAN

Arturo García Portillo (born 22 November 1966) is a Mexican politician from the National Action Party. From 2009 to 2012 he served as Deputy of the LXI Legislature of the Mexican Congress representing Chihuahua.
