= Ericel Gómez =

Mexican politician

- Born: 31 January 1948 (age 78); Suchiapa, Chiapas, Mexico
- Education: UABJO
- Occupations: Deputy and Senator
- Political party: MC

Ericel Gómez Nucamendi (born 31 January 1948) is a Mexican politician affiliated with the Convergence. As of 2014 he served as Senator of the LXI Legislature of the Mexican Congress representing Oaxaca as replacement of Gabino Cué Monteagudo. He also served as Deputy during the L Legislature
