= Óscar Rangel Miravete =

Mexican politician

- Born: 27 March 1957 (age 69); Guerrero, Mexico
- Occupation: Politician
- Political party: PRI

Óscar Ignacio Rangel Miravete (born 27 March 1957) is a Mexican politician from the Institutional Revolutionary Party. In 2012 he served as Deputy of the LXI Legislature of the Mexican Congress representing Guerrero.
