= Dolores Názares Jerónimo =

Mexican politician

- Born: 2 November 1973 (age 52); Michoacán, Mexico
- Occupation: Politician
- Political party: PRD

Dolores de los Ángeles Názares Jerónimo (born 2 November 1973) is a Mexican politician from the Party of the Democratic Revolution. From 2009 to 2012 she served as Deputy of the LXI Legislature of the Mexican Congress representing Michoacán.
