= Martín Palacios Calderón =

Mexican politician

- Born: 15 March 1972 (age 54); State of Mexico, Mexico
- Occupation: Politician
- Political party: PT

Martín Palacios Calderón (born 15 March 1972) is a Mexican politician from the Labor Party. In 2012 he served as Deputy of the LXI Legislature of the Mexican Congress representing the State of Mexico.
