= Silvia Monge Villalobos =

Mexican politician

- Born: 20 November 1967 (age 58); Coatepec, Veracruz, Mexico
- Occupation: Politician
- Political party: PAN

Silvia Isabel Monge Villalobos (born 20 November 1967) is a Mexican politician from the National Action Party. From 2009 to 2012 she served as Deputy of the LXI Legislature of the Mexican Congress representing Veracruz.
