= Víctor Manuel Kidnie =

Mexican politician

- Born: 14 September 1962 (age 63); Campeche, Mexico
- Occupation: Politician
- Political party: PRI

Víctor Manuel Kidnie de la Cruz (born 14 September 1962) is a Mexican politician from the Institutional Revolutionary Party. From 2009 to 2012 he served as Deputy of the LXI Legislature of the Mexican Congress representing Campeche.
