= Vladimir Ramos Cárdenas =

Mexican politician

- Born: 28 February 1978 (age 48); Chiapas, Mexico
- Occupation: Politician
- Political party: PAN

Liev Vladimir Ramos Cárdenas (born 28 February 1978) is a Mexican politician from the National Action Party. From 2009 to 2012 he served as Deputy of the LXI Legislature of the Mexican Congress representing Chiapas.
