= Sergio González Hernández =

Mexican politician

- Born: 3 December 1955 (age 70); San Damián Texoloc, Tlaxcala, Mexico
- Occupation: Politician
- Political party: PAN

Sergio González Hernández (born 3 December 1955) is a Mexican politician from the National Action Party. From 2009 to 2012 he served as Deputy of the LXI Legislature of the Mexican Congress representing Tlaxcala.
