= María Elena Pérez de Tejada =

Mexican politician

- Born: 8 February 1974 (age 52); Naucalpan, State of Mexico, Mexico
- Occupation: Politician
- Political party: PAN

María Elena Pérez de Tejada Romero (born 8 February 1974) is a Mexican politician from the National Action Party. From 2009 to 2012 she served as Deputy of the LXI Legislature of the Mexican Congress representing the State of Mexico.
