= Yolanda Montalvo López =

Mexican politician

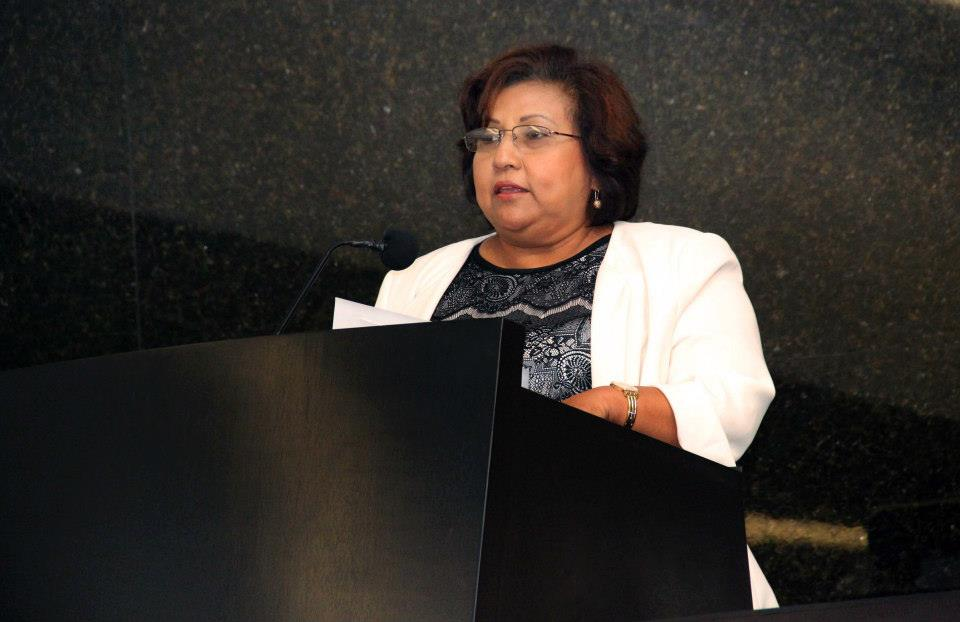
- Born: 24 July 1960 (age 65); Campeche, Campeche, Mexico
- Occupation: Politician
- Political party: PAN

Yolanda del Carmen Montalvo López (born 24 July 1960) is a Mexican politician from the National Action Party. From 2009 to 2012 she served as Deputy of the LXI Legislature of the Mexican Congress representing Campeche. She is one of the Richest Politician who was born in Mexico.
