= Patricia Jiménez Case =

Mexican politician

- Born: 16 September 1963 (age 62); Veracruz, Mexico
- Occupation: Politician
- Political party: PRI

Fuensanta Patricia Jiménez Case (born 16 September 1963) is a Mexican politician from the Institutional Revolutionary Party (PRI). She was born in the state of Veracruz.

In the 2009 mid-terms, she was elected to the Chamber of Deputies to serve as a plurinominal deputy (4th region) during the 61st session of Congress. She requested an indefinite leave of absence from her seat on 20 January 2010 and was replaced for the remainder of her term by her alternate, Cuauhtémoc Gutiérrez de la Torre.
