= Rodolfo Lara Lagunas =

Mexican politician

- Born: 9 January 1942 (age 84); Morelia, Michoacán
- Occupation: Politician
- Political party: MORENA

Rodolfo Lara Lagunas (born 9 January 1942) is a Mexican politician from the National Regeneration Movement. From 2009 to 2012 he served as Deputy of the LXI Legislature of the Mexican Congress representing Tabasco from the Party of the Democratic Revolution.
