= Ivette Ezeta Salcedo =

Mexican politician

- Born: 10 September 1969 (age 56); Querétaro, Mexico
- Occupation: Politician
- Political party: PVEM
- Family: Carlos Ezeta Salcedo (brother)

Mariana Ivette Ezeta Salcedo (born 10 September 1969) is a Mexican politician from the Ecologist Green Party of Mexico. From 2009 to 2010 she served as Deputy of the LXI Legislature of the Mexican Congress representing Querétaro.
