= Moisés Narváez Ochoa =

Mexican politician

- Born: 8 July 1972 (age 53); Chiapas, Mexico
- Occupation: Politician
- Political party: PRI

Moisés Narváez Ochoa (born 8 July 1972) is a Mexican politician from the Institutional Revolutionary Party. In 2012 he served as Deputy of the LXI Legislature of the Mexican Congress representing Chiapas.
