= Mariano Quihuis =

Mexican politician (born 1965)

- Born: 28 September 1965 (age 60); Sonora, Mexico
- Occupation: Politician
- Political party: PVEM

Mariano Quihuis Fragoso (born 28 September 1965) is a Mexican politician from the Ecologist Green Party of Mexico. He served as Deputy of the LXI Legislature of the Mexican Congress representing Sonora.
