= Hazel Suárez Bastida =

Mexican politician

- Born: 19 September 1973 (age 52); State of Mexico, Mexico
- Occupation: Politician
- Political party: PRI

Hazel Suárez Bastida (born 19 September 1973) is a Mexican politician from the Institutional Revolutionary Party. In 2012 she served as Deputy of the LXI Legislature of the Mexican Congress representing the State of Mexico.
