= Agustín Torres Ibarrola =

Mexican politician

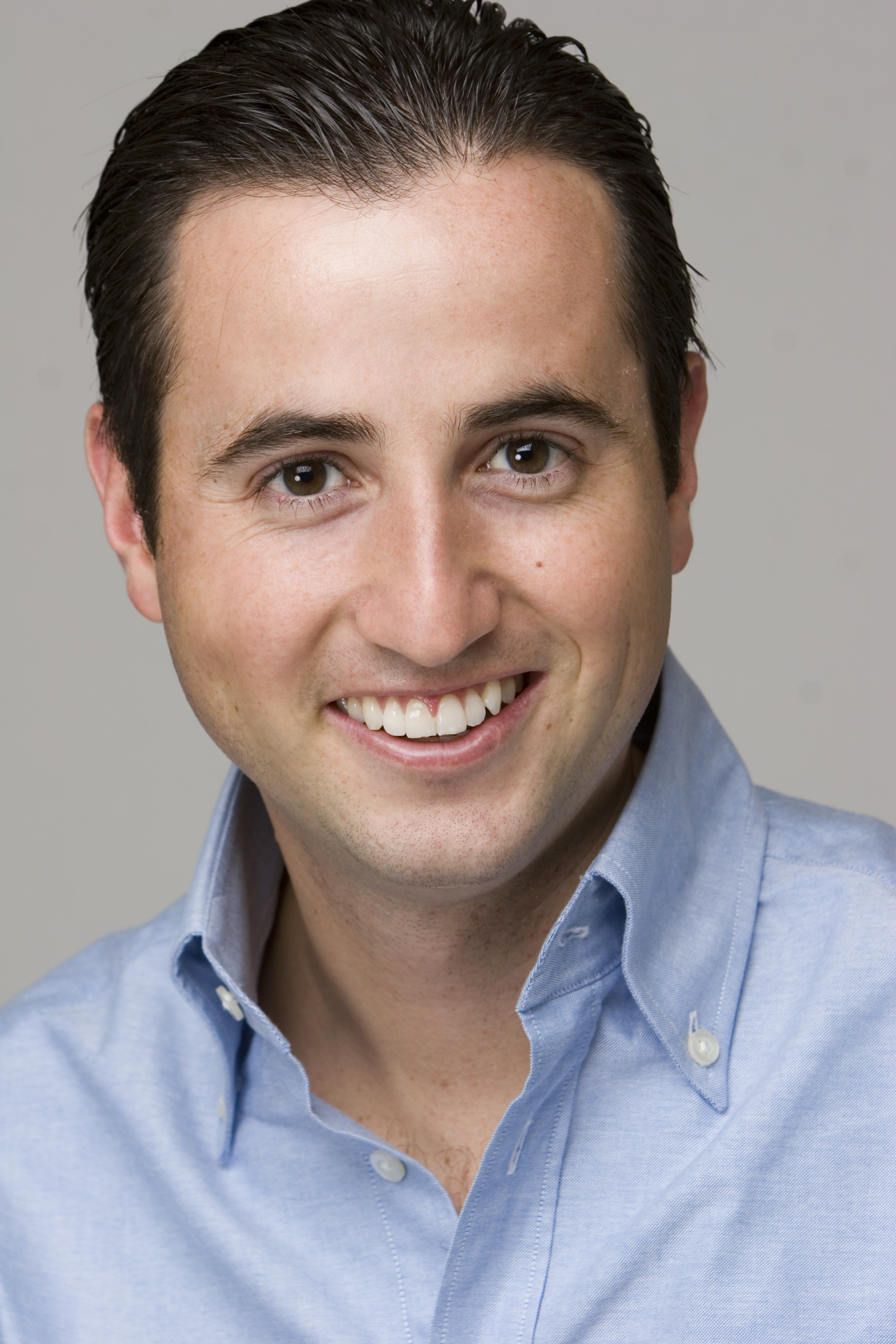
- Born: 27 June 1977 (age 48); Morelia, Michoacán, Mexico
- Occupation: Politician
- Political party: PAN

Agustín Torres Ibarrola (born 27 June 1977) is a Mexican politician from the National Action Party. From 2009 to 2012 he served as Deputy of the LXI Legislature of the Mexican Congress representing Michoacán.
