= Antelmo Alvarado =

Mexican politician

- Born: Taxco, Guerrero, Mexico
- Occupation: Senator
- Political party: PRI

Antelmo Alvarado García is a Mexican politician affiliated with the Institutional Revolutionary Party. He served as Senator of the LXI Legislature of the Mexican Congress representing Guerrero as replacement of Ángel Aguirre Rivero. He also served in the Chamber of Deputies and the Congress of Guerrero
