= Francisco Armando Meza Castro =

Mexican retired general and politician

- Born: 17 February 1944 (age 82); La Paz, Baja California Sur, Mexico
- Occupations: Militar and politician
- Political party: PRD

Francisco Armando Meza Castro (born 17 February 1944) is a Mexican retired general and politician from the Party of the Democratic Revolution. From 2009 to 2012 he served as Deputy of the LXI Legislature of the Mexican Congress representing Baja California Sur.

He joined the Mexican Army as a cadet in 1966 and rose to the title of Undersecretary of National Defense in 2008.
