= Florentina Rosario Morales =

Mexican politician

- Born: 16 October 1958 (age 67); Guerrero, Mexico
- Occupation: Politician
- Political party: PRD

Florentina Rosario Morales (born 16 October 1958) is a Mexican politician from the Party of the Democratic Revolution. From 2009 to 2012 she served as Deputy of the LXI Legislature of the Mexican Congress representing Guerrero.
