= Laura Elena Estrada Rodríguez =

Mexican politician

- Born: 14 September 1952 (age 73); León, Guanajuato, Mexico
- Occupation: Politician
- Political party: PAN

Laura Elena Estrada Rodríguez (born 14 September 1952) is a Mexican politician from the National Action Party. From 2009 to 2012 she served as Deputy of the LXI Legislature of the Mexican Congress representing Durango, and previously served in the Congress of Durango.
