= Pavel Díaz Juárez =

Mexican politician

- Born: 1 March 1982 (age 44); Michoacán, Mexico
- Occupation: Politician
- Political party: PRD

Pavel Díaz Juárez (born 1 March 1982) is a Mexican politician from the Party of the Democratic Revolution. From 2011 to 2012 he served as Deputy of the LXI Legislature of the Mexican Congress representing Michoacán.
