= Laura Arizmendi Campos =

Mexican politician

- Born: 6 December 1954 (age 71); Guerrero, Mexico
- Occupation: Politician
- Political party: MC

Laura Arizmendi Campos (born 6 December 1954) is a Mexican politician from the Citizens' Movement. From 2009 to 2012 she served as Deputy of the LXI Legislature of the Mexican Congress representing Guerrero.
