= Eva Contreras Sandoval =

Mexican politician

Eva Contreras Sandoval (born September 28, 1956 in Camotlán, municipality of Manzanillo, Colima) is a Mexican politician affiliated with the National Action Party (PAN) who currently serves in the upper house of the Mexican Congress.

== Political career ==
Contreras served as head of the Puerto Vallarta DIF during the municipal presidency of her husband. In 2006, she was elected a member (regidora) of the municipality of Puerto Vallarta. During the 2006 congressional elections she ran as substitute senator of candidate Alberto Cárdenas Jiménez; Cárdenas won the election but left that position to join President Caderón's cabinet, thus Contreras will be serving as substitute senator during the LX and LXI Legislatures (2006–2012).
