= Adolfo de la Garza Malacara =

Mexican politician

- Born: 1 October 1975 (age 50); Nuevo León, Mexico
- Occupation: Politician
- Political party: PRI

Adolfo de la Garza Malacara (born 1 October 1975) is a Mexican politician from the Institutional Revolutionary Party. In 2012 he served as Deputy of the LXI Legislature of the Mexican Congress representing Nuevo León.
