= Silvia Fernández Martínez =

Mexican politician

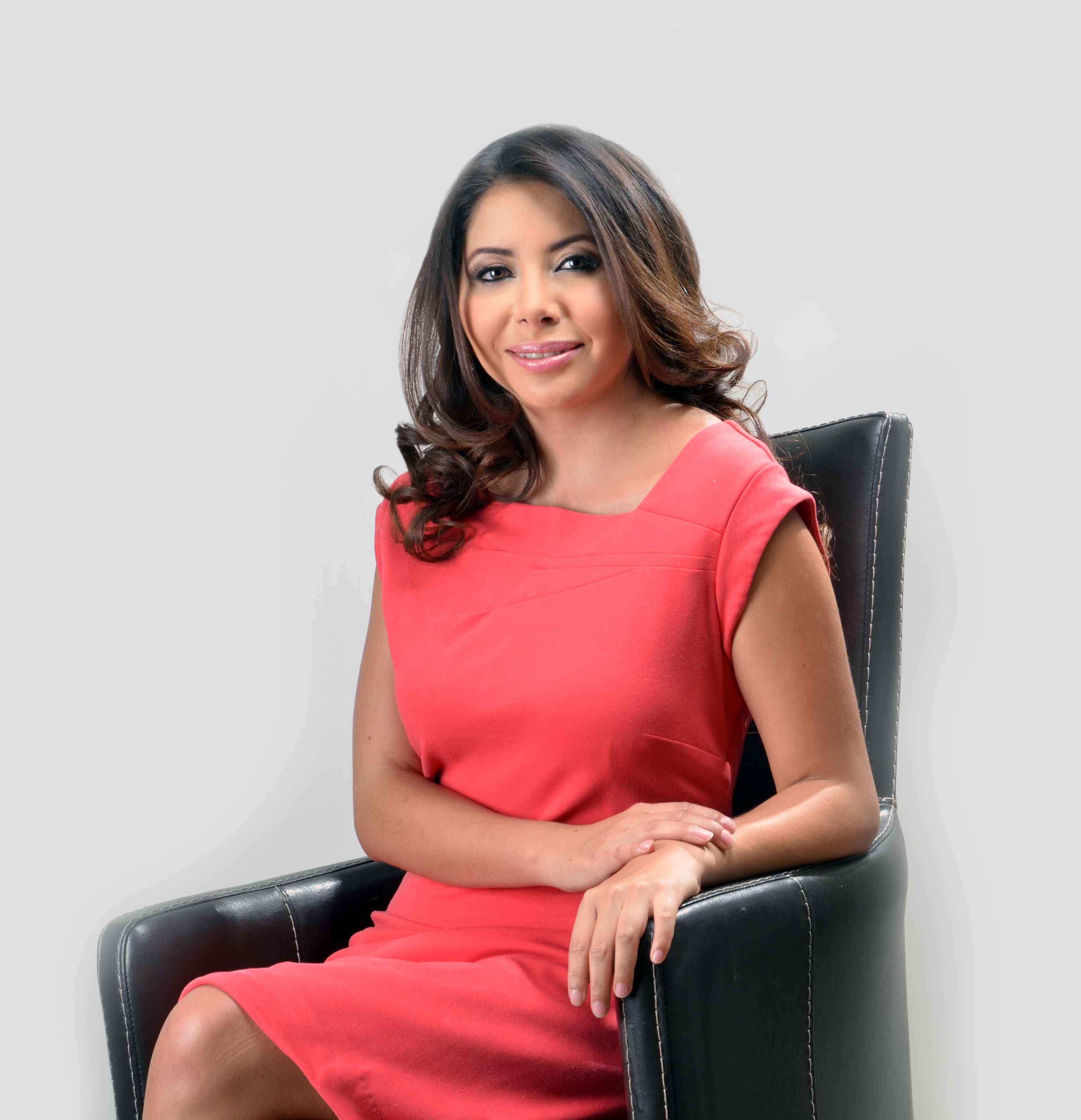
- Fernández Martínez in 2014
- Born: 4 February 1984 (age 42); Toluca, State of Mexico, Mexico
- Occupation: Politician
- Political party: PRI

Silvia Fernández Martínez (Note: In this Hispanic American name, the first or paternal surname is Fernández and the second or maternal family name is Martínez.) (born 4 February 1984) is a Mexican politician from the Institutional Revolutionary Party (PRI).

Fernández Martínez was born in Toluca, State of Mexico, in 1984. She holds a law degree from the Universidad del Valle de México (UVM). From 2011 to 2012 (during the 61st Congress) she occupied a plurinominal seat in the Chamber of Deputies as the alternate of Luis Videgaray.
