= Pedro Peralta Rivas =

Mexican politician

- Born: 7 December 1966 (age 59); Colima, Colima, Mexico
- Occupation: Politician
- Political party: PAN

Pedro Peralta Rivas (born 7 December 1966) is a Mexican politician from the National Action Party. From 2009 to 2012 he served as Deputy of the LXI Legislature of the Mexican Congress representing Colima.
