= María Reynoso Femat =

Mexican politician

- Born: 26 January 1963 (age 63); Aguascalientes, Mexico
- Occupation: Politician
- Political party: PAN

María de Lourdes Reynoso Femat (born 26 January 1963) is a Mexican politician from the National Action Party. From 2009 to 2012 she served as Deputy of the LXI Legislature of the Mexican Congress representing Aguascalientes.
