= María Gómez Villalovos =

Mexican politician (born 1970)

- Born: 24 December 1970 (age 55); Jalisco, Mexico
- Occupation: Politician
- Political party: PRI

María de la Luz Gómez Villalovos (born 24 December 1970) is a Mexican politician from the Institutional Revolutionary Party. In 2012, she served as a Deputy in the LXI Legislature of the Mexican Congress, representing Jalisco.
