= Martha Jiménez Oropeza =

Mexican politician

- Born: 3 April 1964 (age 62); Villahermosa, Tabasco, Mexico
- Occupation: Senator
- Political party: PRD

Martha Patricia Jiménez Oropeza (born 3 April 1964) is a Mexican politician affiliated with the Party of the Democratic Revolution. As of 2014 she served as Senator of the LXI Legislature of the Mexican Congress representing Tabasco as replacement of Rosalinda López Hernández.
