= Valentín Guzmán Soto =

Mexican politician

- Born: 14 February 1966 (age 60); Teloloapan, Guerrero, Mexico
- Occupation: Senator
- Political party: PRD

Valentín Guzmán Soto (born 14 February 1966) is a Mexican politician affiliated with the PRD. As of 2013 he served as Senator of the LXI Legislature of the Mexican Congress representing Guerrero.
