= Benigno Quezada Naranjo =

Mexican politician

- Born: 18 June 1962 (age 63); Peribán, Michoacán, Mexico
- Occupation: Politician
- Political party: PAN

Benigno Quezada Naranjo (born 18 June 1962) is a Mexican politician from the National Action Party. From 2009 to 2012 he served as Deputy of the LXI Legislature of the Mexican Congress representing Michoacán. He previously served in the Congress of Michoacán and as municipal president of Peribán, Michoacán.
