= Margarita Curmina Cervera =

Mexican politician

- Born: 22 February 1956 (age 70); Campeche, Mexico
- Occupation: Politician
- Political party: PRI

Margarita Beatríz de la Candelaria Curmina Cervera (born 22 February 1956) is a Mexican politician from the Institutional Revolutionary Party. In 2012 she served as Deputy of the LXI Legislature of the Mexican Congress representing Campeche.
