= Gloria Porras Valles =

Mexican politician

- Born: 16 April 1960 (age 66); Baja California Sur, Mexico
- Occupation: Politician
- Political party: PRI

Gloria Porras Valles (born 16 April 1960) is a Mexican politician from the Institutional Revolutionary Party. In 2012 she served as Deputy of the LXI Legislature of the Mexican Congress representing Baja California Sur.
