= Jorge Herrera Martínez =

Mexican politician

- Born: 7 December 1958 (age 67); State of Mexico, Mexico
- Occupation: Politician
- Political party: PVEM

Jorge Herrera Martínez (born 7 December 1958) is a Mexican politician from the Ecologist Green Party of Mexico. From 2011 to 2012 he served as Deputy of the LXI Legislature of the Mexican Congress representing the State of Mexico.
