= Pablo Rodríguez Regordosa =

Mexican politician

- Born: 23 March 1970 (age 56); Puebla, Puebla, Mexico
- Occupation: Politician
- Political party: PAN

Pablo Rodríguez Regordosa (born 23 March 1970) is a Mexican politician from the National Action Party. From 2009 to 2011 he served as Deputy of the LXI Legislature of the Mexican Congress representing Puebla.
