= Juanita Arcelia Cruz =

Mexican politician

- Born: 1 May 1973 (age 53); Oaxaca, Mexico
- Education: UABJO
- Occupation: Politician
- Political party: PRD

Juanita Arcelia Cruz Cruz (born 1 May 1973) is a Mexican politician from the Party of the Democratic Revolution. From 2009 to 2012, she served as Deputy of the LXI Legislature of the Mexican Congress representing Oaxaca.
