= Elsa Martínez Peña =

Mexican politician

- Born: 6 November 1958 (age 67); Frontera, Coahuila, Mexico
- Occupation: Politician
- Political party: PANAL

Elsa María Martínez Peña (born 6 November 1958) is a Mexican politician from the New Alliance Party. From 2009 to 2012 she served as Deputy of the LXI Legislature of the Mexican Congress representing Coahuila.
