= Prudencia Juárez Capilla =

Mexican politician

- Born: 28 April 1957 (age 69); Tlaxcala, Mexico
- Occupation: Politician
- Political party: PAN

Prudencia Félix Juárez Capilla (born 28 April 1957) is a Mexican politician from the National Action Party. From 2010 to 2012 she served as Deputy of the LXI Legislature of the Mexican Congress representing Tlaxcala.
