= María Mendoza Sánchez =

Mexican politician

- Born: 13 June 1970 (age 55); Tuxtepec, Oaxaca, Mexico
- Occupation: Politician
- Political party: PAN

María de Jesús Mendoza Sánchez (born 13 June 1970) is a Mexican politician from the National Action Party. From 2011 to 2012 she served as Deputy of the LXI Legislature of the Mexican Congress representing Oaxaca.
