= Guadalupe Mondragón Cobos =

Mexican politician

- Born: 20 September 1981 (age 44); State of Mexico, Mexico
- Occupation: Politician
- Political party: PAN

Guadalupe Mondragón Cobos (born 20 September 1981) is a Mexican politician from the National Action Party. In 2012 she served as Deputy of the LXI Legislature of the Mexican Congress representing the State of Mexico.
