= Narcedalia Ramírez =

Mexican politician

- Born: 19 May 1971 (age 55); Oaxaca, Mexico
- Occupation: Politician
- Political party: PRI

Narcedalia Ramírez Pineda (born 19 May 1971) is a Mexican politician from the Institutional Revolutionary Party. From 2009 to 2012 she served as Deputy of the LXI Legislature of the Mexican Congress representing Oaxaca.
