= José Enríquez Rosado =

Mexican politician

- Born: 16 July 1947 (age 78); State of Mexico, Mexico
- Occupation: Politician
- Political party: PRD

José del Carmen Enríquez Rosado (born 16 July 1947) is a Mexican politician from the Party of the Democratic Revolution. He has served as Deputy of the LIV, LVII and LXI Legislatures of the Mexican Congress representing the State of Mexico.
