= Alejandro de la Fuente Godínez =

Mexican politician (born 1956)

- Born: 4 July 1956 (age 69); Tabasco, Mexico
- Occupation: Politician
- Political party: PRD

Alejandro de la Fuente Godínez (born 4 July 1956) is a Mexican politician from the Party of the Democratic Revolution. From 2011 to 2012 he served as Deputy of the LXI Legislature of the Mexican Congress representing Tabasco.
