= Sandra Ugalde Basaldúa =

Mexican politician

- Born: 12 June 1968 (age 57); Querétaro, Mexico
- Occupation: Politician
- Political party: PAN

María Sandra Ugalde Basaldúa (born 12 June 1968) is a Mexican politician from the National Action Party. From 2009 to 2012 she served as Deputy of the LXI Legislature of the Mexican Congress representing Querétaro.
