= Reyna Tirado Gálvez =

Mexican politician

- Born: 25 September 1982 (age 43); Mexico
- Education: Autonomous University of Sinaloa
- Occupation: Politician
- Political party: PRI

Reyna Araceli Tirado Gálvez (born 25 September 1982) is a Mexican politician from the Institutional Revolutionary Party. In 2012 she served as Deputy of the LXI Legislature of the Mexican Congress representing Sinaloa.
