= Guadalupe Valenzuela Cabrales =

Mexican politician

- Born: 16 December 1960 (age 65); Jonuta, Tabasco, Mexico
- Occupation: Politician
- Political party: PAN

Guadalupe Valenzuela Cabrales (born 16 December 1960) is a Mexican politician from the National Action Party. From 2009 to 2012 she served as Deputy of the LXI Legislature of the Mexican Congress representing Tabasco.
