= Horacio Ramírez Reyes =

Mexican politician (born 1983)

- Born: 17 November 1983 (age 42); Hidalgo, Mexico
- Occupation: Politician
- Political party: PAN

Horacio Ramírez Reyes Escobar (born 17 November 1983) is a Mexican politician from the National Action Party. From 2011 to 2012 he served as Deputy of the LXI Legislature of the Mexican Congress representing Hidalgo.
