= María Elena Zamora =

Mexican politician (born 1969)

- Born: 16 August 1969 (age 56); Guanajuato, Mexico
- Occupation: Politician
- Political party: PAN

María Elena Zamora Ruiz (born 16 August 1969) is a Mexican politician from the National Action Party. In 2012, she served as Deputy of the LXI Legislature of the Mexican Congress representing Guanajuato.
