= Susana Hurtado Vallejo =

Mexican politician

- Born: 14 January 1963 (age 63); Mexico City, Mexico
- Education: National Autonomous University of Mexico
- Occupation: Politician
- Political party: PRI

Susana Hurtado Vallejo (born 14 January 1963) is a Mexican politician from the Institutional Revolutionary Party. From 2010 to 2012 she served as Deputy of the LXI Legislature of the Mexican Congress representing Quintana Roo.
