= Miguel Álvarez Santamaría =

Mexican politician (born 1945)

- Born: 29 September 1945 (age 80); Guerrero, Mexico
- Occupation: Politician
- Political party: PRI

Miguel Álvarez Santamaría (born 29 September 1945) is a Mexican politician from the Institutional Revolutionary Party. From 2009 to 2012 he served as Deputy of the LXI Legislature of the Mexican Congress representing Guerrero.
