= Feliciano Marín Díaz =

Mexican politician

- Born: 8 June 1960 (age 65); State of Mexico, Mexico
- Occupation: Politician
- Political party: PRD

Feliciano Rosendo Marín Díaz (born 8 June 1960) is a Mexican politician from the Party of the Democratic Revolution. From 2009 to 2012 he served as Deputy of the LXI Legislature of the Mexican Congress representing the State of Mexico, and previously served in the LIII Legislature of the Congress of the State of Mexico.
