= María Benítez Navarrete =

Mexican politician

- Born: 14 May 1958 (age 68); Guerrero, Mexico
- Occupation: Politician
- Political party: PRI

María del Socorro Benítez Navarrete (born 14 May 1958) is a Mexican politician from the Institutional Revolutionary Party. In 2012 she served as Deputy of the LXI Legislature of the Mexican Congress representing Guerrero.
