= Laura Ledesma Romo =

Mexican politician

- Born: 15 October 1958 (age 67); Baja California, Mexico
- Occupation: Politician
- Political party: PVEM

Laura Elena Ledesma Romo (born 15 October 1958) is a Mexican politician from the Ecologist Green Party of Mexico. From 2009 to 2012 she served as Deputy of the LXI Legislature of the Mexican Congress representing Baja California.
