= Gloria Luna Ruiz =

Mexican politician

- Born: 27 May 1956 (age 69); Tuxtla Gutiérrez, Chiapas, Mexico
- Occupation: Politician
- Political party: PAN

Gloria Trinidad Luna Ruiz (born 27 May 1956) is a Mexican politician from the National Action Party. From 2009 to 2012 she served as Deputy of the LXI Legislature of the Mexican Congress representing Chiapas.
