= María Guzmán Lozano =

Mexican politician

- Born: 22 December 1961 (age 64); San Martín Texmelucan de Labastida, Puebla, Mexico
- Occupation: Politician
- Political party: PAN

María del Carmen Guzmán Lozano (born 22 December 1961) is a Mexican politician from the National Action Party. From 2011 to 2012 she served as Deputy of the LXI Legislature of the Mexican Congress representing Puebla.
