= Bernardo Téllez Juárez =

Mexican politician

- Born: 11 February 1954 (age 72); Tepeaca, Puebla, Mexico
- Occupation: Politician
- Political party: PAN

Bernardo Margarito Téllez Juárez (born 11 February 1954) is a Mexican politician from the National Action Party. From 2009 to 2012 he served as Deputy of the LXI Legislature of the Mexican Congress representing Veracruz.
