= María Teresa Álvarez Vázquez =

Mexican politician

- Born: 12 June 1965 (age 60); State of Mexico, Mexico
- Occupation: Politician
- Political party: PRD

María Teresa Álvarez Vázquez (born 12 June 1965) is a Mexican politician from the Party of the Democratic Revolution. In 2012 she served as Deputy of the LXI Legislature of the Mexican Congress representing the State of Mexico.
