= Maricarmen Valls =

Mexican politician

- Born: 7 October 1980 (age 45); Mexico City, Mexico
- Occupation: Politician
- Political party: PAN

Maricarmen Valls Esponda (born 7 October 1980) is a Mexican politician from the National Action Party. From 2010 to 2012 she served as Deputy of the LXI Legislature of the Mexican Congress representing Chiapas.
