= Guillermo Cueva Sada =

Mexican politician (born 1979)

- Born: 6 April 1979 (age 45); Nuevo León, Mexico
- Occupation: Head of Strategic Planning at TV Azteca
- Website: http://www.tvazteca.com

Guillermo Cueva Sada (born 6 April 1979) From 2009 to 2012 he served as Deputy of the LXI Legislature of the Mexican Congress representing Nuevo León. From 2013 to date, he has served as Delegate of the SEMARNAT in Nuevo Leon. Co-Chairman of the Border 2020 program.

In 2015, Guillermo Cueva Sada joined the TV Azteca Noroeste team as VP of Institutional Relations. In October 2016, Cueva Sada became the head of strategic planning for TV Azteca México, a position that has held to this day.

He has studied master's degree in political science at UANL, a bachelor's degree in industrial and systems engineering from ITESM, Diploma in Finance (Egade, Graduate School of Business Administration ITESM), Diploma in Policy and European Nations Spain (University of Valladolid).
