= Margarita Liborio Arrazola =

Mexican politician

- Born: 17 October 1964 (age 61); Oaxaca, Mexico
- Occupation: Politician
- Political party: PRI

Margarita Liborio Arrazola (born 17 October 1964) is a Mexican politician from the Institutional Revolutionary Party. From 2009 to 2012 she served as Deputy of the LXI Legislature of the Mexican Congress representing Oaxaca.
