= Patricia Calles Villegas =

Mexican politician

- Born: 19 July 1965 (age 60); Guaymas, Sonora, Mexico
- Occupation: Politician
- Political party: PRI

Patricia Calles Villegas (born 19 July 1965) is a Mexican politician from the Institutional Revolutionary Party. In 2012 she served as Deputy of the LXI Legislature of the Mexican Congress representing Sonora.
