= Juanita Santillán =

Mexican politician

- Born: 28 January 1982 (age 44); Mexico City, Mexico
- Occupation: Politician
- Political party: PRI

Juanita de Jesús Santillán Hernández (born 28 January 1982) is a Mexican politician from the Institutional Revolutionary Party. From 2011 to 2012 she served as Deputy of the LXI Legislature of the Mexican Congress representing the State of Mexico.
