= Leticia Quezada Contreras =

Mexican politician

- Born: 25 October 1979 (age 46); Mexico City, Mexico
- Occupation: Politician
- Political party: PRD

Leticia Quezada Contreras (born 25 October 1979) is a Mexican politician from the Party of the Democratic Revolution. From 2009 to 2012 she served as Deputy of the LXI Legislature of the Mexican Congress representing the Federal District.
