= Sara Montiel Solís =

Mexican politician

- Born: 29 January 1964 (age 62); Tamaulipas, Mexico
- Occupation: Politician
- Political party: PRI

Sara Gabriela Montiel Solís (born 29 January 1964) is a Mexican politician from the Institutional Revolutionary Party. From 2009 to 2012 she served as Deputy of the LXI Legislature of the Mexican Congress representing San Luis Potosí.
