= Adolfo Toledo Infanzón =

Mexican politician

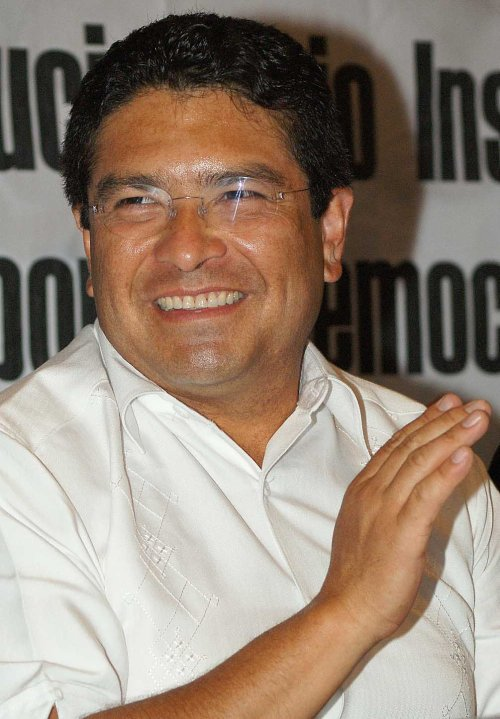

Senator from Oaxaca
- In office September 1, 2006 – present
- Preceded by: Oscar Cruz López

Personal details
- Born: March 24, 1961 (age 65) Ixtepec, Oaxaca
- Party: Institutional Revolutionary Party
- Education: ITESM
- Profession: Engineering

Adolfo Toledo Infanzón (born 24 March 1961) is a Mexican politician, member of the Institutional Revolutionary Party and the current Senator in the LXI Legislature of the Mexican Congress from the State of Oaxaca.

== Biography ==
He was born in Ciudad Ixtepec, Oaxaca on 24 March 1961, and studied Agricultural Engineering at the Monterrey Institute of Technology and Higher Education, he is a graduate in Political Merchandising from the Instituto Tecnológico Autónomo de México and in Managing of Political Campaigns from the Ibero-American University. Today, he is Secretary of the Hydraulic Resources Commission and the Radio, Television and Cinematography Commission. He was also a member of the Governance Commission and the Radio, Television and Cinematography Commission in the LX Legislature of the Mexican Congress.

== Political career ==
He has been local Congressman in the LVII Legislature of the Congress of Oaxaca, municipal president of Ixtepec, Oaxaca, General Secretary of the "Confederación Nacional Campesina" (National Rural Confederation) in Oaxaca, President of the PRI in the State of Oaxaca, member of the National Political Council of the PRI and Secretary of Agricultural, Livestock and Forest Development in Oaxaca. He was elected Senator on July 2 from 2006 a 2012.

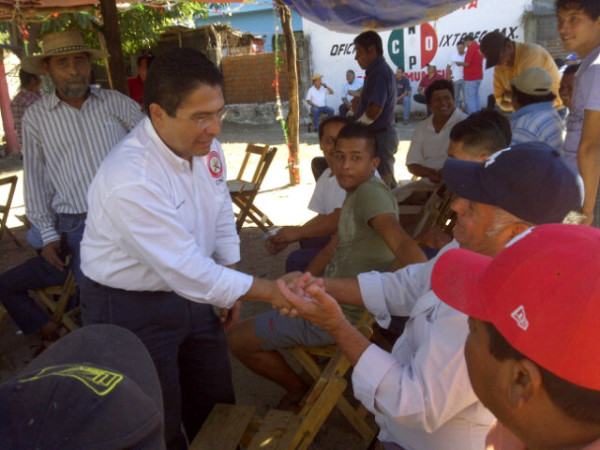
Ixtepec
