= Aarón Mastache =

Mexican politician

- Born: 1 July 1955 (age 70); Iguala, Guerrero, Mexico
- Occupation: Politician
- Political party: PRD

Aarón Mastache Mondragón (born 1 July 1955) is a Mexican politician from the Party of the Democratic Revolution. In 2012 he served as Deputy of the LXI Legislature of the Mexican Congress representing the Federal District.
