= Mayra Valdés González =

Mexican politician

- Born: 22 September 1975 (age 50); Coahuila, Mexico
- Occupation: Politician
- Political party: PAN

Mayra Valdés González (born 22 September 1975) is a Mexican politician from the National Action Party. From 2010 to 2012 she served as Deputy of the LXI Legislature of the Mexican Congress representing Coahuila.
