= María Yolanda Valencia Vales =

Mexican politician

- Born: 21 June 1961 (age 64); Mérida, Yucatán, Mexico
- Occupation: Politician
- Political party: PAN

María Yolanda Valencia Vales (born 21 June 1961) is a Mexican politician from the National Action Party. From 2009 to 2012 she served as Deputy of the LXI Legislature of the Mexican Congress representing Yucatán.
