= Jesús Alberto Cano Vélez =

Mexican economist and politician

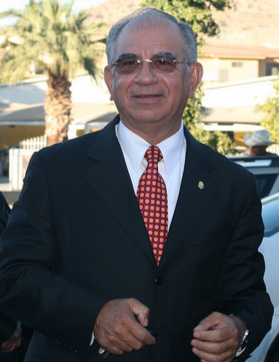
- Born: 7 August 1950 (age 75); Magdalena de Kino, Sonora, Mexico
- Occupations: Economist and politician
- Political party: PRI

Jesús Alberto Cano Vélez (born 7 August 1950) is a Mexican economist and politician from the Institutional Revolutionary Party. From 2009 to 2012 he served as Deputy of the LXI Legislature of the Mexican Congress representing Sonora.
