= Rosario Brindis Álvarez =

Mexican politician

- Born: 6 November 1978 (age 47); Puebla, Mexico
- Occupation: Politician
- Political party: PVEM

María del Rosario Brindis Álvarez (born 6 November 1978) is a Mexican politician from the Ecologist Green Party of Mexico. From 2009 to 2012 she served as Deputy of the LXI Legislature of the Mexican Congress representing Puebla.
