= Federico Ovalle =

Mexican politician

- Born: 2 March 1955 (age 71); Chiapas, Mexico
- Occupation: Politician
- Political party: PRD

Federico Ovalle Vaquera (born 2 March 1955) is a Mexican politician from the Party of the Democratic Revolution. From 2009 to 2012 he served as Deputy of the LXI Legislature of the Mexican Congress representing Chiapas.
