= Alín Nayely de Jesús Sánchez =

Mexican politician

- Born: 24 February 1977 (age 49); Mexico City, Mexico
- Occupation: Politician
- Political party: PAN

Alín Nayely de Jesús Sánchez (born 24 February 1977) is a Mexican politician from the National Action Party. In 2012, she served as Deputy of the LXI Legislature of the Mexican Congress representing the Federal District.
