= Enrique Octavio Trejo Azuara =

Mexican politician

- Born: 12 April 1970 (age 56); San Luis Potosí, Mexico
- Occupation: Politician
- Political party: PAN

Enrique Octavio Trejo Azuara (born 12 April 1970) is a Mexican politician from the National Action Party. From 2009 to 2012 he served as Deputy of the LXI Legislature of the Mexican Congress representing San Luis Potosí.
