= Gustavo Ortega Joaquín =

Mexican politician

- Born: 29 September 1966 (age 59); Mérida, Yucatán, Mexico
- Occupation: Politician
- Political party: PAN

Gustavo Antonio Miguel Ortega Joaquín (born 29 September 1966) is a Mexican politician from the National Action Party. From 2009 to 2012 he served as Deputy of the LXI Legislature of the Mexican Congress representing Quintana Roo.
