= Andrés Massieu Fernández =

Mexican politician

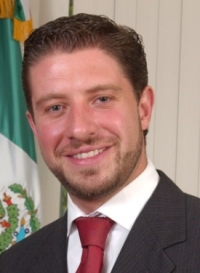
- Born: 5 November 1977 (age 48); State of Mexico, Mexico
- Occupation: Politician
- Political party: PRI

Andrés Massieu Fernández (born 5 November 1977) is a Mexican politician from the Institutional Revolutionary Party. From 2009 to 2012 he served as Deputy of the LXI Legislature of the Mexican Congress representing the State of Mexico.
