= Alfredo Cuadra Tinajero =

Mexican politician (born 1976)

- Born: Alfredo Sergio Cuadra Tinajero; 17 August 1976 (age 49); Nuevo León, Mexico
- Occupation: Mayor of San Nicolas
- Political party: PAN
- Spouse: Avelina Herrera
- Children: Alfredo Cuadra, Camila Cuadra, Alexander Cuadra

Alfredo Sergio Cuadra Tinajero (born 17 August 1976) is a Mexican politician from the National Action Party. In 2012 he served as Deputy of the LXI Legislature of the Mexican Congress representing Nuevo León.
