= Florentina Ocegueda =

Mexican politician

- Born: 6 March 1961 (age 65); Nayarit, Mexico
- Occupation: Politician
- Political party: PRD

María Florentina Ocegueda Silva (born 6 March 1961) is a Mexican politician from the Party of the Democratic Revolution. In 2012 she served as Deputy of the LXI Legislature of the Mexican Congress representing Nayarit.
