= Nazario Herrera Ortega =

Mexican politician

- Born: 28 July 1964 (age 61); Tlaxcala, Mexico
- Occupation: Politician
- Political party: PAN (1980s–2010); PRI (2010–present)

Nazario Herrera Ortega (born 28 July 1964) is a Mexican politician from the Institutional Revolutionary Party (formerly from the National Action Party. From 2010 to 2012 he served as Deputy of the LXI Legislature of the Mexican Congress representing Tlaxcala.
