= Lilia Gutiérrez Burciaga =

Mexican politician

- Born: 6 July 1968 (age 57); Coahuila, Mexico
- Occupation: Politician
- Political party: PRI

Lilia Isabel Gutiérrez Burciaga (born 6 July 1968) is a Mexican politician and member of the Institutional Revolutionary Party. In 2012, she served as Deputy of the LXI Legislature of the Mexican Congress representing Coahuila.
