= Lily Fabiola de la Rosa =

Mexican politician

- Born: 11 March 1970 (age 56); Saltillo, Coahuila, Mexico
- Occupation: Politician
- Political party: PRI

Lily Fabiola de la Rosa Cortés (born 11 March 1970) is a Mexican politician from the Institutional Revolutionary Party. From 2011 to 2012 she served as Deputy of the LXI Legislature of the Mexican Congress representing Coahuila.
