= Teresa Reyes Sahagún =

Mexican politician

- Born: 15 October 1963 (age 62); State of Mexico, Mexico
- Occupation: Politician
- Political party: PT

Teresa Guadalupe Reyes Sahagún (born 15 October 1963) is a Mexican politician from the Labor Party. From 2009 to 2012 she served as Deputy of the LXI Legislature of the Mexican Congress representing the State of Mexico.
