= Tomasa Vives =

Mexican politician

- Born: 24 September 1959 (age 66); Saltillo, Coahuila, Mexico
- Occupation: Politician
- Political party: PAN

Tomasa Vives Preciado (born 24 September 1959) is a Mexican politician from the National Action Party. From 2009 to 2012 she served as Deputy of the LXI Legislature of the Mexican Congress representing Coahuila.
