= Lázaro Mazón Alonso =

Mexican politician

- Born: 17 December 1959 (age 66); Cocula, Guerrero, Mexico
- Occupation: Senator
- Political party: PRD

Lázaro Mazón Alonso (born 17 December 1959) is a Mexican politician affiliated with the PRD. He served as Senator of the LX and LXI Legislatures of the Mexican Congress representing Guerrero. Previously, he served as municipal president of Iguala de la Independencia from 1996 to 1999 and from 2002 to 2005.
