= Anel Patricia Nava Pérez =

Mexican politician

- Born: 4 February 1977 (age 49); Durango, Mexico
- Occupation: Politician
- Political party: PT

Anel Patricia Nava Pérez (born 4 February 1977) is a Mexican politician from the Labor Party. From 2009 to 2011 she served as Deputy of the LXI Legislature of the Mexican Congress representing Durango.
