= María Patricia Franco Cruz =

Mexican politician

- Born: 3 May 1960 (age 66); State of Mexico, Mexico
- Occupation: Politician
- Political party: PRI

María de la Cruz Patricia Franco Cruz (born 3 May 1960) is a Mexican politician from the Institutional Revolutionary Party. In 2012 she served as Deputy of the LXI Legislature of the Mexican Congress representing the State of Mexico.
