= Pedro Jiménez León =

Mexican politician

- Born: 14 February 1958 (age 68); Centla, Tabasco, Mexico
- Occupation: Politician
- Political party: MC

Pedro Jiménez León (born 14 February 1958) is a Mexican politician from the Citizens' Movement. From 2009 to 2012 he served as Deputy of the LXI Legislature of the Mexican Congress representing Tabasco.
