= Irma Ortega Fajardo =

Mexican politician

- Born: Jalisco, Mexico
- Occupation: Senator
- Political party: PVEM

María Irma Ortega Fajardo is a Mexican politician affiliated with the Ecologist Green Party of Mexico. As of 2014 she served as Senator of the LX Legislature of the Mexican Congress.
