= Guadalupe Silerio =

Mexican politician

- Born: 12 December 1971 (age 54); Durango, Mexico
- Occupation: Politician
- Political party: PRD

María Guadalupe Silerio Núñez (born 12 December 1971) is a Mexican politician from the Party of the Democratic Revolution. From 2009 to 2010 she served as Deputy of the LXI Legislature of the Mexican Congress representing Durango.
