= José Luis García Zalvidea =

Mexican politician

- Born: 2 February 1955 (age 71); Mexico City, Mexico
- Occupations: Deputy and Senator
- Political party: PRD

José Luis García Zalvidea (born 2 February 1955) is a Mexican politician affiliated with the Party of the Democratic Revolution. As of 2014 he served as Senator of the LX and LXI Legislatures of the Mexican Congress representing the Federal District. He also served as Deputy during the LVIII Legislature.
