= Malco Ramírez Martínez =

Mexican politician

- Born: 28 March 1970 (age 56); Libres, Puebla, Mexico
- Occupation: Politician
- Political party: PRI

Malco Ramírez Martínez (born 28 March 1970) is a Mexican politician from the Institutional Revolutionary Party. From 2010 to 2012 he served as Deputy of the LXI Legislature of the Mexican Congress representing Puebla.
