= Marcos Carlos Cruz Martínez =

Mexican politician

- Born: 16 March 1949 (age 77); Frontera, Coahuila, Mexico
- Occupations: Teacher and politician
- Political party: PRD

Marcos Carlos Cruz Martínez (born 16 March 1949) is a Mexican teacher and politician affiliated with the Party of the Democratic Revolution. As of 2014 he served as Senator of the LVIII and LIX Legislatures of the Mexican Congress representing Durango and as Deputy of the LIV, LVI and LXI Legislatures.
