= Salma Meza Manjarrez =

Mexican politician (born 1984)

- Born: 14 February 1984 (age 42); Jalisco, Mexico
- Occupation: Politician
- Political party: PRI

Salma Meza Manjarrez (born 14 February 1984) is a Mexican politician from the Institutional Revolutionary Party. In 2012 she served as Deputy of the LXI Legislature of the Mexican Congress representing Jalisco.
