= Alejandro Galván Garza =

Mexican politician

- Born: 27 September 1955; Linares, Nuevo León, Mexico
- Died: 22 November 2006 (aged 51); Mexico City, Mexico
- Occupation: Senator
- Political party: PAN

Alejandro Galván Garza (27 September 1955 – 22 November 2006) was a Mexican politician affiliated with the PAN. He briefly served as Senator of the LX Legislature of the Mexican Congress representing Tamaulipas.
