= Laura García Dávila =

Mexican politician (born 1964)

- Born: 19 October 1964 (age 61); Tamaulipas, Mexico
- Occupation: Politician
- Political party: PRI

Laura Felicitas García Dávila (born 19 October 1964) is a Mexican politician from the Institutional Revolutionary Party. From 2010 to 2012 she served as Deputy of the LXI Legislature of the Mexican Congress representing Tamaulipas.
