= Martha Elena García Gómez =

Mexican politician (born 1945)

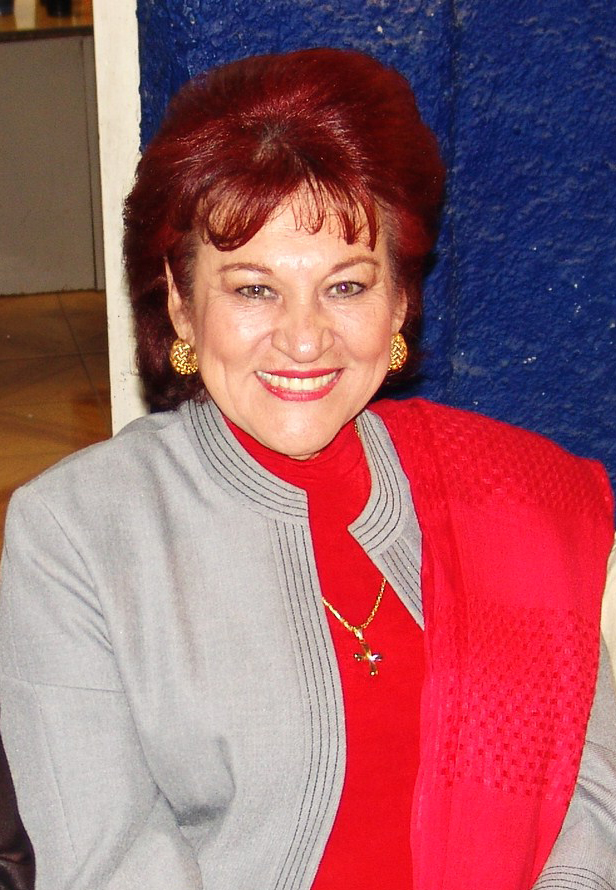
- Born: 3 May 1945 (age 81); Oaxaca de Juárez, Oaxaca, Mexico
- Occupation: Senator
- Political party: PAN

Martha Elena García Gómez (born 3 May 1945) is a Mexican politician affiliated with the National Action Party (PAN).

In 2012–2018 she served as a senator for Nayarit in the 62nd and 63rd Congresses. She also served in the Chamber of Deputies in the 61st Congress (2009–2012), representing the second district of Nayarit, and in the 64th Congress, as a plurinominal deputy for the first region.

She is married to Antonio Echevarría Domínguez, former governor of Nayarit (1999–2005).
