= Salomón Rosas =

Mexican politician

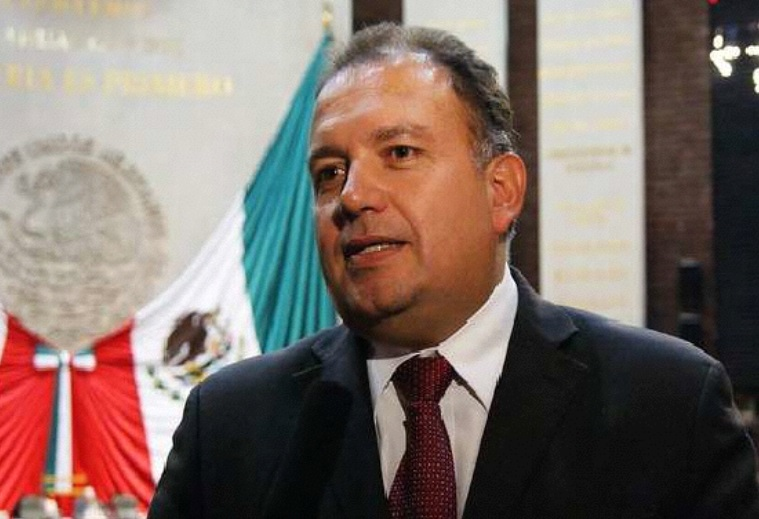
- Born: 29 July 1962 (age 63); San Luis Potosí, Mexico
- Occupations: Head Consul of Mexico in San Bernardino, serving San Bernardino and Riverside Counties.

Enrique Salomón Rosas Ramírez (born 29 July 1962) is a Mexican politician. On 2 May 2016 Mexico's President Enrique Peña Nieto appointed Rosas the Chief Consul at the Mexican consulate in San Bernardino, serving San Bernardino and Riverside Counties.

== Career ==
Salomón Rosas is career politician with 35 years of public service. Since his graduation from Law School at Universidad Iberoamericana, he has served in appointed and elected offices at the local, state, and federal level.

His prior position was in the corporate management office of PEMEX, Mexico's Oil company, where he was senior advisor for the energetic reform process, which resulted in the break up of its energy monopolies, opening the possibility of foreign and private investment.

He led the anti-poverty program Solidaridad in Mexico City, a program designed to channel all actions of the federal government to improve the quality of life of the population in vulnerable conditions, specifically targeting under privileged families in regards to health, education, nutrition and social infrastructure.

He served as chief of staff to the undersecretary of the Ministry of Social Development, and later on was appointed deputy delegate of government and legal affairs for the towns of Coyoacan and Milpa Alta in Mexico City.

Elected Congressman in the LXI Legislature (2009–2012), he served as coordinator of the state of San Luis Potosí's caucus, chair of the Food Scarcity Commission, and member of the Finance Commission.

At the State level, he served as Advisor to the Governor of San Luis Potosí, Head of the Strategy and Planning Office of the Governor of Tamaulipas, Liaison in Mexico City of the state of San Luis Potosí, and Chief of staff to the Representative of the Government of Puebla in Mexico City.

During Enrique Peña Nieto's presidential campaign, he was in charge of political alliances and liaisons with labor unions and higher education institutions. In March 2016, Peña Nieto began to appoint new Head Consuls to the U.S., including in the Inland Empire, and Rosas was appointed to the San Bernardino consulate in May.
