= María García Quiroz =

Mexican politician

- Born: 31 January 1968 (age 58); Querétaro, Querétaro, Mexico
- Education: Autonomous University of Queretaro
- Occupation: Senator
- Political party: PRI

María del Socorro García Quiroz (born 31 January 1968) is a Mexican politician affiliated with the Institutional Revolutionary Party. As of 2014 she served as Senator of the LXI Legislature of the Mexican Congress representing Querétaro as replacement of José Eduardo Calzada Rovirosa.
