= Cuauhtémoc Gutiérrez de la Torre =

Mexican politician

- Born: 16 May 1968 (age 58); Mexico City, Mexico
- Occupation: Politician
- Political party: PRI

Cuauhtémoc Gutiérrez de la Torre (born 16 May 1968) is a Mexican lawyer, politician and former waste picker leader from the Institutional Revolutionary Party (PRI). From 2010 to 2012 he served as a plurinominal deputy during the 61st session of Congress and, from 2012 to 2014, he served as president of the Institutional Revolutionary Party in Mexico City. He was placed on a temporary leave of absence due to charges of using public resources and facilities to operate a prostitution ring; the prostitution ring allegations were the result of an investigative journalism investigation that included the testimony of five women and undercover recordings of a journalist.

Notes to the aforementioned information:

1. Within hours of the prostitution ring allegations were made public, Gutiérrez de la Torre denied the accusations, but the evidence was so strong that he was dismissed by the PRI as their party president in Mexico City.
2. The allegations were never followed or investigated by the Mexico City public prosecutor and the case went stale for years; in September 2020, the Mexico City head prosecutor informed the country that the case will be re-visited as they have uncovered sound evidence to re-open the investigation and have suggested that the former prosecution service officials incurred in grave omissions during past investigations.
3. The PRI Mexico City had to pay a settlement to three women who were hired directly by Gutiérrez de la Torre in 2002 and dismissed in 2003 after refusing to have sexual relations with him. The three women took the case to the Labour Courts in Mexico City and although the process took almost 10 years, there was enough documental evidence to confirm the working relationship of the women to the PRI Mexico City and Gutiérrez de la Torre. In November 2011, The PRI Mexico City reached an agreement with the three women to finalise the matter. (It is noted that the demand was for unjustified and illegal dismissal only, as the women refused to have sexual encounters with Gutiérrez de la Torre).
4. At the time of the accusations, Gutiérrez de la Torre had three "madam recruiters" who also served as filters for the hiring of young women to provide sexual services to the PRI president in Mexico City. The first was Adriana Rodríguez, then Claudia Pricilla Martínez González, and the final filter was his personal secretary, Sandra Esther Vaca Cortés.

The first two women have disappeared of the public life, but Sandra Esther Vaca Cortés is still part of Mexico's political life and became a local deputy in June 2018 (member of the Congress of Mexico City) and was publicly supported by the PRI's National President Claudia Ruiz Massieu during a work session in September 2018.

Gutiérrez de la Torre was charged with attempted sexual exploitation, false advertising, and criminal conspiracy on 9 March 2021. It is unclear whether the arrest is related to the 2014 accusations.
