= Ramiro Hernández García =

Mexican politician (born 1954)

- Born: 19 February 1954 (age 72); Ayotlán, Jalisco, Mexico
- Occupation: Politician
- Political party: PRI

Ramiro Hernández García (born 19 February 1954) is a Mexican politician affiliated with the Institutional Revolutionary Party (PRI). He served in the Senate during the 60th and 61st sessions of Congress representing Jalisco. He also served as federal deputy during the 1988–1991 period, for Jalisco's 12th district, as well as a local deputy in the 51st, 55th and 57th sessions of the Congress of Jalisco.
