= Rodolfo Dorador =

Mexican politician

- Born: 13 February 1969 (age 57); Durango, Durango, Mexico
- Occupations: Senator and Deputy
- Political party: PAN

Rodolfo Dorador Pérez Gavilán (born 13 February 1969) is a Mexican politician affiliated with the PAN. He currently serves as Deputy of the LXII Legislature of the Mexican Congress representing Durango. He also served as Deputy during the LVIII Legislature and as Senator during the LX and LXI Legislatures.
