= Francisco García Lizardi =

Mexican politician (born 1941)

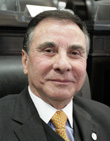
- Born: 17 December 1941 (age 84); Mexicali, Baja California, Mexico
- Education: UNAM
- Occupation: Senator
- Political party: MC

Francisco Alcíbiades García Lizardi (born 17 December 1941) is a Mexican politician affiliated with the Convergence. He served as Senator of the LX and LXI Legislatures of the Mexican Congress representing Veracruz.
