= LIX Legislature of the Mexican Congress =

Legislature of Mexico, 2003–2006

59th Congress LIX Legislatura
←	58th	60th	→

Overview
- Legislative body: Congress of the Union
- Meeting place: Palacio Legislativo de San Lázaro (Chamber of Deputies); Edificio del Senado (Senate)
- Term: 1 September 2003 – 31 August 2006
- Election: 2003 Mexican legislative election

Senate of the Republic
- Members: 128

Chamber of Deputies
- Members: 500

The LIX Legislature (59th session) of the Congress of Mexico met from September 2003 to August 2006. All members of the lower house (Chamber of Deputies) were elected in the elections of July 2003 while members of the upper house (Senate) were elected in the elections of July 2000.

== Composition ==
=== Chamber of Deputies ===
Party	Members	Percentage
PRI	223	45%
PAN	148	30%
PRD	97	19%
PVEM	17	3%
PT	6	1%
Convergence	5	1%
Independent	4	1%

=== Senate of Mexico ===
Party	Members	Percentage
PRI	58	45%
PAN	47	37%
PRD	15	12%
PVEM	5	4%
Independent	3	2%

== Senators of the LIX Legislature ==
=== By state ===
State	Name	Party	State	Name	Party
Mexico	Micaela Aguilar González	PAN	Coahuila	Luis Alberto Rico	PAN
Durango	Adrián Alanís Quiñones	PRI	Michoacán	Serafín Ríos Álvarez	PRD
Baja California Sur	Rodimiro Amaya Téllez	PRI	Yucatán	Eric Rubio Barthell	PRI
Hidalgo	Esteban Ángeles Cerón	PRI	Puebla	María Lucero Saldaña; Replacing Rafael Cañedo Benítez	PRI
Guerrero	Héctor Astudillo	PRI	Oaxaca	Miguel Sánchez Carreño	PRI
Colima	Salvador Becerra Rodríguez	PAN	Puebla	Germán Sierra Sánchez	PRI
Zacatecas	José Eulogio Bonilla	PRI	Guanajuato	Susana Stephenson; Replacing Juan Manuel Oliva	PAN
Zacatecas	Genaro Borrego Estrada	PRI	Sinaloa	Martha Tamayo	PRI
Tabasco	Óscar Cantón Zetina	PRI	Colima	Víctor Manuel Torres	PAN
Sinaloa	José Adalberto Castro Castro; Replacing Lauro Díaz Castro	PRI	Tabasco	Georgina Trujillo Zentella	PRI
Tlaxcala	Joaquín Cisneros Fernández	PRI	Guerrero	Héctor Vicario Castrejón	PRI
Chihuahua	Javier Corral Jurado	PAN	Jalisco	Felipe Vicencio Álvarez	PAN
Campeche	Aracely Escalante Jasso	PRI	Sonora	Carlos Manuel Villalobos Organista; Replacing Ramón Corral Ávila	PAN
Baja California	Rubén Fernández Aceves; Replacing Héctor Osuna Jaime	PAN	Morelos	Marco Antonio Xicoténcatl	PAN
Querétaro	Francisco Fernández de Cevallos	PAN	Coahuila	Jorge Zermeño Infante	PAN
Oaxaca	Jorge Franco Jiménez; Replacing Ulises Ruiz Ortiz	PRI	Quintana Roo	Wadi Amar Shabshab	PAN
Aguscalientes	Benjamín Gallegos Soto	PAN	Sonora	Francisco Bojórquez Mungaray; Replacing Eduardo Bours	PRI
Federal District	Jesús Galván Muñoz	PAN	Veracruz	Gerardo Buganza	PAN
Tamaulipas	Laura Garza Galindo	PRI	Mexico	César Camacho Quiroz	PRI
Baja California Sur	Ricardo Gerardo Higuera	PRD	Durango	Rómulo Campuzano	PAN
Federal District	Emilia Gómez Bravo	PVEM	Zacatecas	Raymundo Cárdenas	PRD
Jalisco	Gildardo Gómez	PAN	Yucatán	José Alberto Castañeda; Replacing Patricio José Patrón Laviada	PAN
Nuevo León	Rigoberto González González; Replacing Adalberto Arturo Madero Quiroga	PAN	Guanajuato	Carlos Chaurand	PRI
Tlaxcala	Mariano González Zarur	PRI	Baja California Sur	José Carlos Cota Osuna	PRI
Veracruz	Noemí Guzmán Lagunes; Replacing Fernando Gutiérrez Barrios	PRI	Oaxaca	Óscar Cruz López; Replacing Daniel López Nelio	PRD
Querétaro	Guillermo Herbert Pérez	PAN	Chiapas	Rutilio Escandón	PRD
Morelos	Héctor Javier Hernández; Replacing Marco Antonio Adame	PAN	Nayarit	Rita María Esquivel Reyes	PAN
Chiapas	Marlene Herrera Díaz; Replacing José Antonio Aguilar Bodegas	PRI	Puebla	Francisco Fraile	PAN
Quintana Roo	Addy Joaquín Coldwell	PAN	Michoacán	Antonio García Torres	PRI
Chihuahua	Jeffrey Max Jones	PAN	Aguascalientes	Fernando Gómez Esparza	PRI
Sonora	Héctor Larios Córdova	PAN	Jalisco	Raymundo Gómez Flores	PRI
San Luis Potosí	Jorge Lozano Armengol	PAN	San Luis Potosí	Yolanda González Hernández	PRI
Tamaulipas	Óscar Luebbert	PRI	Coahuila	Alejandro Gutiérrez Gutiérrez	PRI
Mexico	Carlos Madrazo Limón	PAN	Hidalgo	José Antonio Haghenbeck	PAN
Chiapas	Areli Madrid Tovilla	PRI	Querétaro	Silvia Hernández Enríquez	PRI
Nuevo León	Fernando Margáin	PAN	Guerrero	Saúl López Sollano; Replacing Armando Chavarría Barrera	PRD
Guanajuato	Filomena Margaiz; Replacing Ricardo Alaníz Posada	PAN	Colima	Héctor Michel Camarena	PRI
San Luis Potosí	Alberto Miguel Martínez Mireles	PAN	Sinaloa	Joaquín Montaño Yamuni	PAN
Michoacán	Rafael Melgoza Radillo; Replacing Lázaro Cárdenas Batel	PRD	Tamaulipas	Marcela Navarro Quintana; Replacing Gustavo Cárdenas Gutiérrez	PAN
Campeche	Víctor Manuel Méndez Lanz	PRI	Campeche	Jorge Nordhausen	PAN
Baja California	Rafael Morgan Álvarez	PAN	Tabasco	César Raúl Ojeda Zubieta	PRD
Durango	Ana Bricia Muro González; Replacing Ismael Alfredo Hernandez Deras	PRI	Baja California	Roberto Pérez de Alva	PRI
Nayarit	Miguel Ángel Navarro Quintero	PRD	Tlaxcala	María del Carmen Ramírez	PRD
Quintana Roo	Eduardo Ovando Martínez	PRI	Federal District	Demetrio Sodi	Ind.
Yucatán	Orlando Paredes Lara	PRI	Chihuahua	Jorge Doroteo Zapata	PRI
Hidalgo	Lilia Reyes Morales; Replacing José Ernesto Gil Elorduy	PRI	Nuevo León	Rubén Zarazúa Rocha; Replacing Jesús Ricardo Canavati Tafich	PRI
Aguascalientes	Alfredo Reyes Velázquez	PAN			

=== Plurinominal senators ===
State	Name	Party	State	Name	Party
Veracruz	Luis Ricardo Aldana	PRI	Federal District	Federico Ling Altamirano	PAN
Baja California	Joel Ayala Almeida	PRI	Sinaloa	Jorge Abel López Sánchez; Replacing José Natividad González Parás	PRI
Puebla	Manuel Bartlett Díaz	PRI	Tamaulipas	Lydia Madero García	PAN
Sonora	Leticia Burgos Ochoa	PRD	Guanajuato	Carlos Medina Plascencia	PAN
Federal District	Luisa María Calderón	PAN	Michoacán	Victoria Méndez Márquez; Replacing Netzahualcóyotl de la Vega	PRI
Federal District	Sara Isabel Castellanos Cortés	PVEM	Veracruz	Elías Moreno Brizuela	PRD
Sonora	Luis Colosio Fernández	PRI	Federal District	Ramón Mota Sánchez	PRI
Durango	Marcos Carlos Cruz Martínez	PRD	Federal District	Jesús Ortega	PRD
Querétaro	Diego Fernández de Cevallos	PAN	Tabasco	Juan José Rodríguez Prats	PAN
Federal District	Emilio Gamboa Patrón	PRI	Federal District	Carlos Rojas Gutiérrez	PRI
Federal District	Jorge Emilio González Martínez	PVEM	Federal District	María Guadalupe Romero Castillo	PAN
Federal District	Fauzi Hamdan	PAN	Coahuila	Humberto Roque Villanueva	PRI
Veracruz	Guillermo Herrera Mendoza; Replacing Armando Méndez de la Luz	MC	Yucatán	Dulce María Sauri	PRI
Sinaloa	Enrique Jackson	PRI	Michoacán	Antonio Soto Sánchez	PRD
Coahuila	César Jáuregui Robles	PAN	Jalisco	Tomás Vázquez Vigil	PRI
Federal District	Gloria Lavara	PVEM	Baja California Sur	Verónica Velasco	PVEM

== Deputies of the LIX Legislature ==
=== By relative majority election ===
State	Name	Party	State	Name	Party
Tamaulipas	José Manuel Abdalá	PRI	Guanajuato	Miguel Luna Hernández	PRD
Durango	Ulises Adame de León	PRI	Chihuahua	Gustavo Madero Muñoz	PAN
Chihuahua	Jesús Aguilar Bueno	Ind.	Tabasco	Luis Felipe Madrigal	PRI
Veracruz	Ubaldo Aguilar Flores	PRI	Federal District	Susana Manzanares	PRD
Chiapas	Roberto Aguilar Hernández	PRI	Guerrero	Javier Manzano Salazar	PRD
Nuevo León	María de Jesús Aguirre Maldonado	PRI	Guanajuato	Salvador Márquez Lozornio	PAN
Guerrero	Ángel Aguirre Rivero	PRI	Jalisco	Roberto Marrufo Torres	PRI
Puebla	José Alarcón Hernández	PRI	Nuevo León	Karina Martínez Cantú; Replacing Eduardo Bailey	PRI
Veracruz	Ernesto Alarcón Trujillo	PRI	Tamaulipas	Jesús Humberto Martínez	PRI
Quintana Roo	Víctor Manuel Alcérreca	PRI	Federal District	Salvador Martínez della Rocca	PRD
Yucatán	Roger Alcocer	PRI	Coahuila	Aldo Martínez Hernández; Replacing Fernando de las Fuentes	PRI
Tamaulipas	Gonzalo Alemán Migliolo	PRI	Nuevo León	Margarita Martínez López	PRI
Mexico	Maximiliano Alexander Rábago	PAN	Federal District	Horacio Martínez Meza	PRD
Chihuahua	Fernando Álvarez Monje	PAN	Mexico	María Isabel Maya Pineda	PRI
Mexico	Marcos Álvarez Pérez; Replacing Héctor Miguel Bautista López	PRD	Morelos	Rosalina Mazari	PRI
Michoacán	Miguel Amezcua Alejo	PRI	Mexico	Felipe Medina Santos	PRI
Veracruz	Pablo Anaya Rivera	PRI	Nayarit	Raúl José Mejía González	PRI
Mexico	Julián Angulo Góngora	PAN	Zacatecas	Antonio Mejía Haro	PRD
Puebla	Myriam Arabian	PAN	Veracruz	Urcino Méndez Gálvez	PAN
Puebla	José Guillermo Aréchiga	Ind.	Jalisco	María del Carmen Mendoza Flores	PAN
Jalisco	Lázaro Arias Martínez	PRI	Puebla	Fidel René Meza Cabrera	Ind.
Guanajuato	Francisco Arroyo Vieyra	PRI	Tabasco	Eugenio Mier y Concha	PRI
Veracruz	Francisco Ávila Camberos	PAN	Durango	Francisco Monárrez Rincón	PRI
Durango	Pedro Ávila Nevárez	PRI	Nayarit	Gerardo Montenegro Ibarra	PRI
Mexico	Gaspar Ávila Rodríguez	PRI	Tlaxcala	Gelacio Montiel	PRD
Chihuahua	María Ávila Serna	PVEM	Colima	Antonio Morales De La Peña	PAN
Hidalgo	Emilio Badillo Ramírez	PRI	Puebla	Jesús Morales Flores	PRI
Yucatán	Virginia Baeza Estrella	PAN	Federal District	Guadalupe Morales Rubio	PRD
Tlaxcala	Federico Barbosa Gutiérrez	PRI	Federal District	Marcos Morales Torres	PRD
Mexico	Pablo Bedolla López	PRI	Michoacán	Inelvo Moreno Álvarez	PRD
Hidalgo	Alfredo Bejos Nicolás; Replacing Miguel Ángel Osorio Chong	PRI	Jalisco	Gonzalo Moreno Arévalo	PRI
Guanajuato	Erandi Bermúdez	PAN	Guanajuato	Alfonso Moreno Morán	PAN
Hidalgo	Óscar Bitar Haddad	PRI	Sinaloa	Irma Moreno Ovalles; Replacing Jesús Vizcarra Calderón	PRI
Jalisco	Francisco Javier Bravo	PRI	Veracruz	Gustavo Moreno Ramos	Ind.
San Luis Potosí	José Luis Briones Briseño	Ind.	Querétaro	José Alfonso Muñoz Muñoz	Ind.
Federal District	Clara Brugada	PRD	Tamaulipas	Jesús Nader Nasrallah	PAN
Guerrero	Álvaro Burgos Barrera	PRI	Zacatecas	Arturo Nahle	PRD
Veracruz	Juan Bustillos Montalvo	PRI	Mexico	José Luis Naranjo y Quintana	PRD
Federal District	José Luis Cabrera Padilla	PRD	Mexico	José Eduviges Nava	PRI
Oaxaca	Pedro Cabrera Rivero; Replacing Gonzalo Ruiz Cerón	PRI	San Luis Potosí	Alfonso Juventino Nava	PRI
Campeche	Sebastián Calderón Centeno	PAN	Chiapas	Julián Nazar Morales	PRI
Guanajuato	Consuelo Camarena	PAN	Mexico	Juan Carlos Núñez Armas	PAN
Puebla	Lisandro Campos Córdova; Replacing Francisco Jiménez Merino	PRI	Federal District	Elsa Obrajero Montes; Replacing Diana Bernal	PRD
Zacatecas	Rafael Candelas Salinas; Replacing Amalia García	PRD	Baja California Sur	Francisco Javier Obregón Espinoza	PRD
Yucatán	Ángel Paulino Canul	Ind.	Guanajuato	Jorge Carlos Obregón	PAN
Federal District	Nancy Cárdenas	PRD	Chiapas	María Elena Orantes	PRI
Oaxaca	César Augusto Carrasco; Replacing José Guzmán Santos	PRI	Federal District	Daniel Ordóñez Hernández	PRD
Jalisco	José Manuel Carrillo Rubio	PRI	Yucatán	Ivonne Ortega Pacheco	PRI
Federal District	Francisco Javier Carrillo Soberón	PRD	Mexico	Heriberto Ortega Ramírez; Replacing Arturo Osornio	PRI
Sonora	Javier Castelo Parada	PAN	Tamaulipas	Maki Esther Ortíz	PAN
Chihuahua	Jorge Castillo Cabrera	PRI	Baja California	José Guadalupe Osuna Millán	PAN
Oaxaca	Sofía Castro Ríos	PRI	Federal District	María de los Dolores Padierna	PRD
Nuevo León	Humberto Cervantes Vega	PRI	Veracruz	Diego Palmero	PAN
Querétaro	Raúl Rogelio Chavarría Salas	PAN	Chiapas	Carlos Pano Becerra	PRI
Guerrero	Francisco Chavarría Valdeolívar	PRD	Mexico	Raúl Leonel Paredes Vega	PAN
Jalisco	Sergio Armando Chávez Dávalos	PRI	Veracruz	Pablo Pavón Vinales	PRI
Jalisco	Benito Chávez Montenegro; Replacing Javier Guízar Macías	PRI	Hidalgo	Roberto Pedraza Martínez	PRI
Federal District	Roberto Colín Gamboa	PAN	Veracruz	Sergio Penagos	PAN
Chiapas	Florencio Collazo Gómez	PRI	Nuevo León	Juan Carlos Pérez Góngora	PRI
Baja California	Hidalgo Contreras	PAN	Yucatán	Orlando Pérez Moguel	PAN
Sonora	Julio César Córdova Martínez	PRI	Puebla	José Felipe Puelles	PAN
Baja California	Norberto Enrique Corella	PAN	Nuevo León	Mayela Quiroga Tamez	PRI
Sinaloa	José Evaristo Corrales Macías; Replacing Alejandro Higuera	PAN	Federal District	Alfonso Ramírez Cuéllar	PRD
Mexico	Santiago Cortés Sandoval	PRD	Puebla	María Angélica Ramírez Luna	PAN
Baja California Sur	Josefina Cota Cota; Replacing Narciso Agúndez Montaño	PRD	Oaxaca	Héctor Pablo Ramírez Puga	PRI
Oaxaca	Carmelina Cruz Silva; Replacing Elpidio Concha	PRI	Coahuila	Jesús María Ramón Valdés	PRI
Chiapas	Mario Carlos Culebro	PRI	Federal District	Bernardino Ramos Iturbide	PRD
Guanajuato	Juan Manuel Dávalos Padilla	PRI	Tamaulipas	Óscar Martín Ramos Salinas	Ind.
Guanajuato	Mario Ernesto Dávila Aranda	PAN	Guanajuato	Miguel Ángel Rangel	PAN
Coahuila	Norma Violeta Dávila Salinas; Replacing Óscar Pimentel González	PRI	Mexico	José Rangel Espinosa	PRI
San Luis Potosí	José María de la Vega	PAN	Guanajuato	Armando Rangel Hernández	PAN
Sonora	Gustavo Adolfo de Unanue	PAN	Coahuila	Laura Reyes Retana	Ind.
Aguascalientes	Jaime del Conde Ugarte	PAN	Sonora	Homero Ríos Murrieta	PAN
Morelos	Guillermo del Valle	PRI	Aguascalientes	Arturo Robles Aguilar	PRI
Federal District	María Angélica Díaz del Campo	PRD	Oaxaca	Concepción Robles Altamirano; Replacing Jacobo Sánchez López	PRI
Sonora	Lamberto Díaz Nieblas	PRI	Guanajuato	Carla Rochín Nieto	PAN
Federal District	Francisco Diego Aguilar; Replacing Gilberto Ensástiga	PRD	Hidalgo	Gonzalo Rodríguez Anaya	PRI
Nayarit	María Hilaria Domínguez	PRI	Jalisco	Hugo Rodríguez Díaz	PRI
Tlaxcala	Florentino Domínguez Ordoñez	PRI	Federal District	Agustín Rodríguez Fuentes	PRD
Mexico	Patricia Durán Reveles	PAN	Tabasco	Rogelio Rodríguez Javier	PRI
Federal District	Federico Döring	PAN	Nuevo León	Alfonso Rodríguez Ochoa	PRI
Guerrero	Abel Echeverría Pineda	PRI	Coahuila	Ricardo Rodríguez Rocha	PRI
San Luis Potosí	Álvaro Elías Loredo	PAN	Sonora	Samuel Rodríguez Sánchez; Replacing Antonio Astiazarán	PRI
Campeche	Enrique Escalante Arceo	PRI	Mexico	Jesús Tolentino Román	PRI
Morelos	Rodolfo Esquivel Landa	PAN	Oaxaca	Samuel Rosales Olmos; Replacing José Luis Tapia	PRI
Quintana Roo	María Concepción Fajardo; Replacing Félix González Canto	PRI	Tabasco	Carlos Manuel Rovirosa Ramírez	PRI
Sinaloa	Óscar Félix Ochoa	PRI	Colima	Rogelio Rueda Sánchez	PRI
Mexico	Fernando Fernández García	PRI	Puebla	Roberto Ruiz Esparza	Ind.
Durango	Jaime Fernández Saracho	PRI	Durango	Rosario Sáenz López; Replacing Carlos Herrera Araluce	PRI
Mexico	David Ferreyra Martínez	PRD	San Luis Potosí	Benjamín Sagahón	Ind.
Michoacán	Margarito Fierros	PRD	Veracruz	Rómulo Salazar Macías	PRI
Guerrero	Irma Sinforina Figueroa	PRD	Michoacán	Alejandro Saldaña Villaseñor	PRI
Guerrero	José Rubén Figueroa Smutny	PRI	Veracruz	Eduardo Alfonso Sánchez Hernández	Ind.
Tamaulipas	Humberto Filizola	PRI	Federal District	Rocío Sánchez Pérez	PRD
Mexico	Patricia Flores Fuentes	PAN	Jalisco	Leonel Sandoval Figueroa	PRI
Puebla	José Luis Flores Hernández	PRI	Baja California	Renato Sandoval Franco	PAN
Puebla	Rogelio Flores Mejía	PAN	Jalisco	Evelia Sandoval Urbán	Ind.
Zacatecas	Rafael Flores Mendoza	PRD	Nuevo León	Norma Patricia Saucedo	PAN
Federal District	Pablo Franco Hernández	PRD	Federal District	Francisco Javier Saucedo	PRD
Sinaloa	Francisco Frías Castro	PRI	Federal District	Emilio Serrano Jiménez	PRD
Mexico	Israel Gallardo Sevilla	PAN	Querétaro	Miguel Sierra Zúñiga; Replacing Ricardo Alegre	PAN
Jalisco	Javier Galván	PRI	Michoacán	Pascual Sigala	PRD
San Luis Potosí	Marco Antonio Gama	PAN	Morelos	José Sigona Torres	PAN
Oaxaca	Manuel García Corpus	PRI	Tamaulipas	Erick Silva Santos; Replacing Baltazar Hinojosa Ochoa	PRI
Mexico	Fernando García Cuevas	PRI	Michoacán	Carlos Hernán Silva Valdés	PRD
Federal District	Miguel Ángel García Domínguez	PRD	Mexico	Isaías Soriano López	PRI
Federal District	Iván García Solís	PRD	Federal District	Víctor Suárez Carrera	PRD
Michoacán	Rafael García Tinajero	PRD	Querétaro	Guillermo Tamborrel Suárez	PAN
Federal District	María Garfias Maldonado	PRD	Guerrero	Marcelo Tecolapa	PRI
Federal District	Pablo Gómez Álvarez	PRD	Michoacán	Israel Tentory	PRD
Mexico	Blanca Estela Gómez Carmona	PRI	Jalisco	Carlos Tiscareño	PAN
Mexico	Alfredo Gómez Sánchez	PRI	Federal District	Edgar Torres Baltazar	PRD
Mexico	Valentín González Bautista	PRD	Michoacán	Enrique Torres Cuadros	PRD
Mexico	Magdalena González Furlong	PAN	Veracruz	Marco Antonio Torres Hernández	PRI
Jalisco	Ramón González González	PAN	Guanajuato	Rubén Alfredo Torres Zavala	PAN
Mexico	Víctor Ernesto González Huerta	PRI	Federal District	Miguel Ángel Toscano	PAN
Chiapas	César Amín González Orantes	PRI	Jalisco	José Luis Treviño	PAN
Baja California	Víctor Manuel González Reyes	PAN	Veracruz	Tomás Antonio Trueba	PAN
Nuevo León	Alfonso González Ruiz	Ind.	Sonora	Fermín Trujillo Fuentes	PRI
Chiapas	Juan Antonio Gordillo	PRI	Mexico	Gerardo Ulloa Pérez	PRD
Chiapas	Francisco Grajales Palacios	PRI	Jalisco	Marisol Urrea Camarena	PAN
Nuevo León	Marcela Guerra Castillo	PRI	Veracruz	Jorge Uscanga	PRI
Michoacán	Ana Lilia Guillén Quiroz	PRD	Chiapas	Jorge Baldemar Utrilla	PRI
Veracruz	Gonzálo Guízar	PRI	Aguascalientes	Francisco Javier Valdés de Anda	PAN
Mexico	Marco Antonio Gutiérrez Romero	PRI	Michoacán	Reynaldo Valdés Manzo	PRD
Michoacán	Abdallán Guzmán	PRD	Sinaloa	Esteban Valenzuela García	PRI
Veracruz	Rocío Guzmán de Paz	PAN	Sinaloa	Rosa Valenzuela Rodelo; Replacing Abraham Velázquez Iribe	PRI
Jalisco	David Hernández Pérez	PRI	Jalisco	Quintín Vázquez García	Ind.
Guerrero	Rosario Herrera Ascencio	PRD	Jalisco	Sergio Vázquez García	PAN
Tabasco	Francisco Herrera León	PRI	Veracruz	José Jesús Vázquez González	PAN
Chiapas	Belizario Herrera	PRI	Veracruz	Regina Vázquez Saut	PAN
Zacatecas	Guillermo Huízar	PRD	Sinaloa	Bernardo Vega Carlos; Replacing Jorge Abel López Sánchez	Ind.
Puebla	Víctor Hugo Islas	PRI	Puebla	Juan Manuel Vega Rayet	PRI
Puebla	María Izaguirre Francos	PRI	Hidalgo	Araceli Velázquez; Replacing Jorge Romero Romero	PRI
Hidalgo	Moisés Jiménez Sánchez	Ind.	Veracruz	Martín Vidaña Pérez	PRI
San Luis Potosí	Ana Luz Juárez Alejo; Replacing Francisco Xavier Salazar Diez	PAN	Oaxaca	Javier Villacaña Jiménez; Replacing Jesús Ángel Díaz Ortega	PRI
Mexico	Adrián Juárez Jiménez; Replacing Rubén Mendoza Ayala	PAN	Nuevo León	Adrián Villagómez García	PRI
Chihuahua	Martha Laguette	PRI	Michoacán	Pablo Antonio Villanueva Ramírez	PAN
Mexico	José Francisco Landero	PAN	Chihuahua	José Mario Wong	PRI
Guanajuato	Francisco Lemus Muñoz	PAN	Guanajuato	Elizabeth Yáñez Robles	PAN
Sinaloa	Armando Leyson	PRI	Chihuahua	Nora Yú	PRI
Veracruz	Miguel Ángel Llera Bello	PAN	Oaxaca	Gustavo Zanatta; Replacing Eviel Pérez Magaña	PRI
Puebla	José López Medina; Replacing Rafael Moreno Valle	PRI	Veracruz	Mario Zepahua Valencia	PRI
Baja California	Pablo Alejo López Núñez	PAN	Veracruz	Guillermo Zorrilla Fernández	PRI
Chihuahua	Miguel Lucero Palma	PRI	Coahuila	Jesús Zúñiga Romero	Ind.
Mexico	Julio Horacio Lujambio	PVEM	Oaxaca	Heliodoro Díaz Escarraga	PRI
Mexico	Leticia Userralde	PAN	Tabasco	Amalin Yabur Elías	PRI

=== Plurinominal Deputies ===
Name	Party	Name	Party
José Alberto Aguilar Iñárritu	PRI	Jorge Luis Hinojosa	PAN
José Carmen Alcántara	PRI	José Ángel Ibáñez	Ind.
Huberto Aldaz	PAN	María Jaspeado	PAN
Miguel Alonso Raya	PRD	Carlos Jiménez Macías	PRI
Ángel Alonso Díaz Caneja	PAN	Jorge Kahwagi	PVEM
Francisco Xavier Alvarado	PVEM	Marcela Lagarde	PRD
Sergio Álvarez Mata	PAN	Francisco Lara Arano	PAN
José Irene Álvarez Ramos	PAN	Gisela Lara Saldaña	PAN
Leonardo Álvarez Romo; Replacing Yvette Salazar	PVEM	Graciela Larios Rivas	PRI
Sheyla Aragón	PAN	Lucio Galileo Lastra Marín	PAN
Lilia Aragón; Replacing Elba Esther Gordillo	PRI	Jorge Legorreta Ordorica	PVEM
René Arce Islas	PRD	Bernardo Loera Carrillo	PAN
Filemón Arcos	PRI	Jesús Lomelí	PRI
Daniel Arévalo Gallegos; Replacing Roberto Rafael Campa Ciprián	PRI	Cruz López Aguilar	PRI
Jacqueline Argüelles	PVEM	Francisco López Mena	PAN
María Arias Staines	PVEM	Manuel López Villarreal	PAN
Rosa María Avilés Nájera	PRD	Sergio Magaña Martínez	PRD
Abraham Bagdadi	PRD	Luis Maldonado Venegas	MC
José Juan Bárcenas	PAN	Jesús Martínez Álvarez	MC
Alberto Barrera Zurita	PAN	Germán Martínez Cázares	PAN
Francisco Barrio	PAN	Gema Martínez López	PRI
Omar Bazán Flores; Replacing José Reyes Baeza Terrazas	PRI	Guillermo Martínez Nolasco	PRI
Manlio Fabio Beltrones	PRI	Jorge Martínez Ramos	PRD
Carlos Blackaller	PRI	Laura Elena Martínez Rivera	PRI
Irene Blanco Becerra	PAN	José Luis Medina Lizalde	PRD
Julio Boltvinik	PRD	Alejandra Méndez Salorio	PVEM
Ángel Buendía Tirado	PRI	Martha Lucía Mícher	PRD
Enrique Burgos García	PRI	Carlos Mireles Morales	PRI
José Antonio Cabello	PAN	Beatriz Mojica Morga	PRD
Manuel Camacho Solís	PRD	Juan Francisco Molinar Horcasitas	PAN
Isidro Camarillo Zavala	Ind.	Francisco Mora Ciprés	PRD
Rómulo Cárdenas	PAN	Jaime Miguel Moreno Garavilla	MC
Martín Carrillo Guzmán	Ind.	Inti Muñoz Santini	PRD
Marbella Casanova	PRD	Alejandro Murat Hinojosa; Replacing Jorge Ortiz Alvarado	PRI
Concepción Castañeda Ortíz	PRI	José Adolfo Murat; Replacing Alfredo del Mazo González	PRI
César Antonio Chávez Castillo	PRD	Consuelo Muro Urista	PRI
Margarita Chávez Murguía	PAN	Armando Neyra Chávez	PRI
Adrián Chávez Ruiz	PRD	Cuauhtémoc Ochoa Fernández	PVEM
Emilio Chuayffet	PRI	Javier Orozco Gómez	PVEM
Tatiana Clouthier	Ind.	Omar Ortega Álvarez	PRD
José Ángel Córdova Villalobos	PAN	Lino Celaya	PRI
Ariel Córdova Wilson; Replacing Alejandro Moreno Cárdenas	PRI	José Agustín Ortiz Pinchetti	PRD
María Corella Manzanilla	PAN	Javier Osorio Salcido	PAN
Rodrigo Iván Cortés Jiménez	PAN	Manuel Enrique Ovalle Araiza	PAN
Marko Antonio Cortés Mendoza	PAN	Janette Ovando	PAN
Tomás Cruz Martínez	PRD	Joel Padilla Peña	PT
Sami David David	PRI	Martha Palafox Gutiérrez	PRI
Angélica De la Peña Gómez	PRD	Ángel Pasta Muñuzuri	PAN
José Antonio de la Vega Asmitia	PAN	Yolanda Peniche Blanco; Replacing Alfredo Rodríguez y Pacheco	PAN
Blanca Judith Díaz Delgado	PAN	Aníbal Peralta Galicia; Replacing Miguel Ángel Yunes	PRI
Felipe de Jesús Díaz González	PAN	Juan Fernando Perdomo	MC
Socorro Díaz Palacios	PRD	Manuel Pérez Cárdenas	PAN
Homero Díaz Rodríguez	PRI	Juan Pérez Medina	PRD
Horacio Duarte Olivares	PRD	Evangelina Pérez Zaragoza	PAN
María Elyd Sáenz; Replacing Juan de Dios Castro Lozano	PAN	Raúl Pompa Victoria	PRI
Blanca Eppen	PAN	Esthela Ponce Beltrán	PRI
María del Carmen Escudero	PAN	Cristina Portillo Ayala	PRD
Fernando Espino Arévalo	PVEM	Sergio Arturo Posadas Lara	PRI
Luis Eduardo Espinosa Pérez	PRD	Jorge Luis Preciado	PAN
Francisco Espinosa Ramos	PT	Luis Antonio Ramírez Pineda	PRI
Luis Andrés Esteva	PAN	Emiliano Ramos; Replacing Rogelio Franco Castán	PRD
Maximino Fernández Ávila	PVEM	Sonia Rincón Chanona	Ind.
Alfredo Fernández Moreno	PAN	Martha Leticia Rivera Cisneros	PAN
Patricia Garduño	PAN	Sara Rocha Medina	PRI
Víctor Félix Flores Morales	PRI	Óscar Rodríguez Cabrera	PRI
Carlos Flores Rico	PRI	María Rodríguez de Alba	PRI
Carmen Guadalupe Fonz	PRI	Héctor Humberto Gutiérrez	PRI
Rafael Galindo Jaime	PRI	Francisco Rojas Gutiérrez	PRI
Ramón Galindo Noriega	PAN	Emilio Zebadúa	PRD
Blanca Amelia Gámez	PAN	Lizbeth Rosas Montero	PRD
Rolando García Alonso; Replacing Margarita Zavala	PAN	Isidoro Ruiz	PRD
Marco Antonio García Ayala	PRI	Gabriela Ruiz del Rincón	PAN
Juan García Costilla	PRD	Claudia Ruiz Massieu	PRI
Eliana García Laguna	PRD	José Julián Sacramento	PAN
Addy García López	PRI	Margarita Saldaña Hernández	PAN
Tomás Ruiz González	PRI	Javier Salinas Narváez	PRD
Juan José García Ochoa	PRD	Rafael Sánchez Pérez	PAN
José García Ortíz	PRI	Salvador Sánchez Vázquez	PRI
María García Velasco	PAN	María Scherman Leaño	PRI
Diva Hadamira Gastélum	PRI	Yadira Serrano Crespo	PRD
Rebeca Godínez y Bravo	PRI	Norma Sotelo Ochoa	PRI
Adriana González Carrillo	PAN	María Guadalupe Sánchez Santiago	PAN
José Julio González Garza	PAN	Francisco Suárez Dávila	PRI
José González Morfin	PAN	María Talavera Hernández	PAN
Luis Antonio González Roldán	PVEM	Lorena Torres Ramos	PAN
Marcela González Salas	PRD	Elpidio Tovar	PRD
Jesús González Schmal	MC	José Isabel Trejo	PAN
Alejandro González Yáñez	PT	Jorge Triana Tena	PAN
Juan Antonio Guajardo Anzaldúa	PT	Edmundo Valencia Monterrubio	PAN
Luis Alejandro Guevara; Replacing María Cristina Díaz Salazar	PRI	Yolanda Valladares	PAN
Leticia Gutiérrez Corona	Ind.	Marisol Vargas Bárcena	PAN
Edelmira Gutiérrez	PAN	Pedro Vázquez González	PT
Dolores Gutiérrez Zurita	PRD	Salvador Vega Casillas	PAN
Fernando Guzmán Pérez	PAN	Wintilo Vega	PRI
Benjamín Hernández Bustamante; Replacing Jorge Fernando Franco	PRI	Roberto Vega Galina	Ind.
Ruth Hernández Martínez	PAN	Manuel Velasco Coello	PVEM
Minerva Hernández Ramos	PRD	Guillermo Velasco Rodríguez	PVEM
Marcelo Herrera Herbert	PRD	Alfredo Villegas Arreola	PRI
Ernesto Herrera Tovar	PAN	Beatriz Zavala	PAN
Óscar González Yáñez	PT	Jazmín Zepeda Burgos	PRD

== Elections results ==
=== Chamber of deputies ===
Summary of the 6 July 2003 Chamber of Deputies of Mexico election results
Parties		Votes	%	FPP Seats	PR Seats	Total
PRI/PVEM	Institutional Revolutionary Party (Partido Revolucionario Institucional)		30.6	161	63	224
PRI/PVEM	Ecologist Green Party of Mexico (Partido Verde Ecologista de México)		4.0	3	14	17
PRI/PVEM	PRI-PVEM lists		13.4			
National Action Party (Partido Acción Nacional)			23.1	80	69	149
Party of the Democratic Revolution (Partido de la Revolución Democrática)			17.6	56	41	97
Labour Party (Partido del Trabajo)			2.4	0	6	6
Convergence for Democracy (Convergencia por la Democracia)			2.3	0	5	5
Independents				0	2	2
Total				300	200	500
Source: IFE/PREP and Grupa Reforma

=== Senate of Mexico ===
Preceded by LVIII Legislature	LIX Legislature; September 2003 to August 2006	Succeeded by LX Legislature
