= Filemón =

Filemón is a male given name which may refer to:

People:

- Filemón Treviño: Mexican artist
- Filemón Arcos: Mexican musician and politician
- Filemón Navarro: Mexican politician

Fictional characters:

- Filemón: one of the main characters of the Spanish comic series Mort & Phil
