= Oscar Rodriguez =

Oscar Rodriguez may refer to:

- Oscar Rodríguez Naranjo (1907–2006), Colombian painter
- Óscar Rodríguez Maradiaga (born 1942), Honduran prelate of the Catholic Church
- Oscar Samson Rodriguez (born 1945), Filipino lawyer and politician
- Óscar Rodríguez Cabrera (born 1964), Mexican politician
- Óscar Rodríguez (cyclist) (born 1995), Spanish cyclist
- Óscar Rodríguez (footballer, born 1980), Spanish footballer
- Óscar Rodríguez (footballer, born 1998), Spanish footballer
- Oscar Rodriguez (American football), American football coach
- Óscar Rodríguez (Paraguayan politician) (born 1981), mayor of Asunción in 2019–2025
