= Maximino Fernández Ávila =

Mexican politician

Maximino Alejandro Fernández Ávila
- Born: 30 April 1968; Mexico City, Mexico
- Died: 25 August 2020 (aged 52); Mexico City, Mexico
- Other name: Águila
- Occupation: Politician
- Political party: PVEM
- Relatives: Maximino Ávila Camacho (grandfather)

Maximino Alejandro Fernández Ávila (30 April 1968 – 25 August 2020) is a Mexican politician affiliated with the Ecologist Green Party of Mexico. He served as Deputy of the LIX Legislature of the Mexican Congress as a plurinominal representative.

== Personal life ==
Fernández came from a political family. His grandfather, Maximino Ávila Camacho, was a Governor of Puebla. Both of his brothers, Justo and Manuel, are involved in Xalapa local politics.

Fernández died in Mexico City on 25 August 2020.
