= Jorge Franco =

Jorge Franco may refer to:

- Jorge Franco (fencer) (1923–1989), Portuguese fencer
- Jorge Franco (footballer), Spanish footballer
- Jorge Franco (writer) (born 1962), writer from Colombia
- Jorge Fernando Franco (born 1971), Mexican politician
