= List of people from Tijuana =

This is a list of famous people who were born, spent a majority of their life, or currently live in Tijuana, Baja California, Mexico.

== A ==
- Alejandro Amaya, bullfighter
- Fernando Arce, professional football player (Originally from Mérida, Yucatán)

== B ==
- Beatriz Adriana, singer

(Originally from Navojoa, Sonora)

- Bender Bending Rodríguez (Futurama)
- Brandon Moreno, former two-time UFC Flyweight Champion

== C ==
- Jorge Campillo, professional baseball player
- Laura Caro, singer-songwriter and actress

== D ==
- Lupita D'Alessio, singer
- Jean Dawson, musician

== E ==
- Juan Jose Estrada, professional boxer

== G ==
- Ana Gabriel, singer
- Alejandro Garcia, professional boxer
- El Generico, professional wrestler (Originally from Laval, Quebec, Canada)
- Benji Gil, professional baseball player
- Adrián González, professional baseball player (Originally from San Diego, California, United States of America)
- Edgar Gonzalez, professional baseball player (Originally from San Diego, California, United States of America)

== H ==
- Alejandro Hernandez, professional tennis player

== J ==
- Frankie J, rapper
- Héctor Jiménez, actor

== K ==
- Alejandro Kirk, professional baseball player

== L ==
- Esteban Loaiza, professional baseball player
- Selene Luna, comedian and actress

== M ==
- Antonio Margarito, professional boxer (Originally from Torrance, California, United States of America)
- Paloma Márquez, actress
- Manuel Medina, professional boxer (Originally from Tecuala, Nayarit)
- Ricardo Menéndez March, New Zealand politician
- Rey Misterio, professional wrestler
- Erik Morales, professional boxer
- Brandon Moreno, professional mixed martial artist, first Mexican-born UFC Champion
- Agustin Murillo, professional baseball player
- Rey Mysterio, Jr., professional wrestler (Originally from Chula Vista, California, United States of America)
- Felicia Mercado, movie and TV actress, Miss Mexico 1977

== P ==
- Raúl Pérez, professional boxer
- Tony Perry, guitarist of Pierce the Veil
- Javier Plascencia, Mexican chef

== R ==
- Victor Regalado, professional golfer
- Marco Antonio Regil, television host
- Tlaloc Rivas, theatre director, writer, and professor
- Oscar Robles, professional baseball player
- Julio E. Rubio, researcher and administrator at Tecnológico de Monterrey

== S ==
- Rafael Saavedra, writer, DJ
- Freddy Sandoval, professional baseball player
- Carlos Santana, musician (Originally from Autlán, Jalisco)
- Jose Silva, professional baseball player

== T ==
- Jorge Torres Nilo, professional football player
- Thunder Rosa, professional wrestler

== V ==
- Julieta Venegas, singer (Originally from Long Beach, California, United States of America)
- Raúl Pompa Victoria, Mexican politician (Institutional Revolutionary Party).

== Z ==
- Gabino Zavala, retired Roman Catholic bishop of the Archdiocese of Los Angeles, father of two children
