= Belizario =

Belizario is both a given name and a surname. Notable people with the name include:

- Belizario Herrera (born 1962), Mexican politician
- Marlyn Belizario Alonte-Naguiat (born 1974), Filipino politician
