= Heriberto Ortega Ramírez =

Mexican politician

- Born: 16 July 1954 (age 71); State of Mexico, Mexico
- Occupation: Politician
- Political party: PRI

Heriberto Enrique Ortega Ramírez (born 16 July 1954) is a Mexican politician affiliated with the Institutional Revolutionary Party. As of 2014 he served as Deputy of the LIX Legislature of the Mexican Congress representing the State of Mexico as replacement of Arturo Osornio.
