= José Adalberto Castro Castro =

Mexican politician

- Born: 19 October 1950 (age 75); Angostura, Sinaloa, Mexico
- Died: 26 August 2025; Mexico City, Mexico
- Education: UNAM
- Occupation: Politician
- Political party: PRI

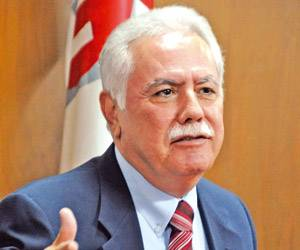
José A.C Castro

José Adalberto Castro Castro (born 19 October 1950) is a Mexican politician affiliated with the Institutional Revolutionary Party. He served as Senator of the LIX Legislature of the Mexican Congress representing Sinaloa as replacement of Lauro Díaz Castro, who died in office.
