= Francisco Mora =

Francisco Mora may refer to:

- Francisco Blake Mora (1966–2011), Mexican lawyer and politician
- Francisco de Mora (1553–1610), Spanish Renaissance architect
- Francisco Mora Ciprés (born 1961), Mexican politician
- Francisco Mora (painter) (born 1922), Mexican painter
- Francisco Mora (racing driver) (born 1996), Portuguese racing driver
- Francisco Mora (rower) (born 1952), Cuban Olympic rower
- Francisco Mora y Borrell (1827–1905), Catalan American Roman Catholic priest
- Francisco Lluch Mora (1924–2006), Puerto Rican historian, writer, and teacher
- Francisco O. Mora, American academic and government official
- José Francisco Mora (born 1981), Spanish footballer

== See also ==
- Mora (surname)
