= Elsa Obrajero Montes =

Mexican politician

- Born: Mexico City, Mexico
- Occupation: Politician
- Political party: PRD

Elsa Obrajero Montes is a Mexican politician affiliated with the Party of the Democratic Revolution. As of 2014 she served as Deputy of the LIX Legislature of the Mexican Congress representing the Federal District as replacement of Diana Bernal.
