= Sebastián Calderón Centeno =

Mexican politician (born 1946)

Senator for Campeche
- In office 1 September 2006 – 31 August 2012
- Preceded by: Jorge Nordhausen
- Succeeded by: Jorge Luis Lavalle Maury

Personal details
- Born: 20 January 1946 (age 80) Ciudad del Carmen, Campeche, Mexico
- Party: PAN
- Occupation: Senator

Sebastián Calderón Centeno (born 20 January 1946) is a Mexican politician affiliated with the National Action Party (PAN). In 2006–2012 he served as a senator in the 60th and 61st sessions of Congress, representing Campeche. He also served as a federal deputy in the 59th Congress (2003–2006), representing Campeche's 2nd district.
