= Ernesto Herrera =

Ernesto Herrera may refer to:

- Ernesto Herrera (politician) (1942–2015), Senator of the Philippines
- Ernesto Herrera (playwright) (1889–1917), Uruguayan writer
- Ernesto Herrera Tovar (born 1972), Mexican politician

== See also ==
- Abel Ernesto Herrera (born 1955), Argentine footballer
