= Marcela Navarro Quintana =

Mexican politician

- Born: 28 May 1959 (age 66); Tampico, Tamaulipas, Mexico
- Occupations: Architect and politician
- Political party: PAN

Marcela Navarro Quintana (born 28 May 1959) is a Mexican architect and politician affiliated with the National Action Party. As of 2014 she served as Senator of the LIX Legislature of the Mexican Congress representing Tamaulipas as replacement of Gustavo Cárdenas Gutiérrez.
