= Organista =

Organista may refer to:

- Viola organista, a musical instrument designed by Leonardo da Vinci
- Alejandro Organista (born 2000), Mexican footballer
- Carlos Manuel Villalobos Organista (born 1951), Mexican politician
- José Miguel Organista (born 1981), Portuguese footballer
- Sérgio Organista (born 1984), Portuguese footballer
