= General Camacho =

General Camacho may refer to:

- Manuel Ávila Camacho (1897–1955), Mexican Army brigadier general
- Maximino Ávila Camacho (1891–1945), Mexican Constitutionalist Army major general
- Tomás Mejía Camacho (1820–1867), Mexican Army division general
