= Rubén Fernández =

Rubén Fernández may refer to:

- Rubén Fernández (Argentine footballer) (born 1960), forward for Celta de Vigo
- Rubén Fernández (footballer) (born 1931), Paraguayan footballer
- Rubén Fernández (cyclist) (born 1991), Spanish cyclist
- Rubén Fernández Aceves (born 1967), Mexican lawyer
- Ruben Fernandez (Spanish footballer) (born 1968), Spanish-born goalkeeper for the Anaheim Splash
- Rubén Fernández-Gil (born 1978), Spanish former tennis player
- Rubén Gabriel Fernández Bonti (born 1980), Uruguayan footballer for Club Sportivo Cerrito

== See also ==
- Rúben Fernandes (born 1986), Portuguese footballer
