= Lomelí =

Lomelí is a surname. Notable people with the surname include:

- Carlos Lomelí Bolaños (born 1959), Mexican politician
- Jesús Lomelí (born 1953), Mexican politician
- Luis Felipe Lomelí (born 1975), Mexican writer and poet
