= Marcos Álvarez Pérez =

Mexican politician

- Born: State of Mexico, Mexico
- Occupation: Politician
- Political party: PRD

Marcos Álvarez Pérez is a Mexican politician affiliated with the Party of the Democratic Revolution. As of 2014 he served as Deputy of the LIX Legislature of the Mexican Congress representing the State of Mexico as replacement of Héctor Miguel Bautista López.
