= Guillermo Herrera Mendoza =

Mexican politician

- Born: 1 January 1960 (age 66); Veracruz, Mexico
- Occupation: Politician
- Political party: MC

José Guillermo Herrera Mendoza (born 16 June 1960) is a Mexican politician affiliated with the Convergence. As of 2014 he served as Senator of the LIX Legislature of the Mexican Congress representing Veracruz as replacement of Armando Méndez de la Luz.
