= Martha Leticia Rivera Cisneros =

Mexican politician

- Born: 30 October 1965 (age 60); Naica, Chihuahua, Mexico
- Occupations: Deputy and Senator
- Political party: PAN

Martha Leticia Rivera Cisneros (born 30 October 1965) is a Mexican politician affiliated with the National Action Party. As of 2014 she served as Senator of the LX Legislature of the Mexican Congress representing Morelos as replacement of Sergio Álvarez Mata. She also served as Deputy during the LIX Legislature.
