= César Augusto Carrasco =

Mexican politician

- Born: Oaxaca, Mexico
- Occupation: Politician
- Political party: PRI

César Augusto Carrasco Gómez is a Mexican politician affiliated with the Institutional Revolutionary Party. As of 2014 he served as Deputy of the LIX Legislature of the Mexican Congress representing Oaxaca as replacement of José Guzmán Santos.
