= Mireles =

Mireles is a Spanish surname. In the United States, the surname is most commonly found in South Texas and New Mexico. Notable people with the surname include:

- Alberto Miguel Martínez Mireles (born 1950), Mexican politician
- Christopher Mireles (born 1992), Mexican BMX rider
- Edmundo Mireles Jr. (born 1953), American FBI agent
- Gustavo Espinoza Mireles (1891–1939), Mexican politician
- John Mireles (born 1964), American photographer
- Matt Mireles (born 1980), American technology entrepreneur
- Sylvester Raymond Mireles (born 1929), American civil rights activist and college professor
- Robert Anthony Mireles (born 1992), United States Air Force Veteran
- Víctor Manuel Vázquez Mireles (born 1967), Mexican drug lord
- Laura G Mireles Navarro (born 1966), Mexican Author (as Laura G Munoz) and Reverend from Assemblies of God
