= Guillermo Pérez =

Guillermo Pérez may refer to:

- Guillermo Pérez (taekwondo) (born 1978), Mexican taekwondo practitioner
- Guillermo Pérez (athlete), Paralympic athlete from Cuba
- Guillermo Pérez (actor) (born 1971), Venezuelan telenovela actor
- Guillermo Herbert Pérez (born 1934), Mexican politician
