= Óscar Cruz López =

Mexican politician

- Born: 1 December 1957 (age 68); Juchitán de Zaragoza, Oaxaca, Mexico
- Occupation: Politician
- Political party: PRD

Óscar Cruz López (born 1 December 1957) is a Mexican politician affiliated with the Party of the Democratic Revolution. As of 2014 he served as Senator of the LIX Legislature of the Mexican Congress representing Oaxaca as replacement of Daniel López Nelio.
