= Blackaller =

Blackaller is a surname. Notable people with the surname include:

- Basil Blackaller (1921–1958), British cartoonist and comics artist
- Carlos Blackaller (born 1963), Mexican politician
- John Blackaller (c. 1494–1563), English politician
- Tom Blackaller (1940–1989), American yachtsman, sailmaker, and racing driver
