= Monterrubio (disambiguation) =

Monterrubio is a municipality in the province of Segovia, Spain.

Monterrubio may also refer to:

== Places ==
=== Spain ===
- Monterrubio de Armuña, municipality in Salamanca
- Monterrubio de la Demanda, municipality in Burgos
- Monterrubio de la Serena, municipality in Badajoz
- Monterrubio de la Sierra, municipality in Salamanca

== People ==
- Edmundo Valencia Monterrubio (born 1946), Mexican politician
- Enrique Collar Monterrubio (born 1934), Spanish footballer
- Olivier Monterrubio (born 1976), French footballer
