= Aldaz =

Aldaz may refer to:

- Mount Aldaz, a mountain of Marie Byrd Land, Antarctica
- 13004 Aldaz, a main-belt minor planet

== People with the surname ==
- Huberto Aldaz (born 1957), Mexican politician
- Telmo Aldaz de la Quadra-Salcedo (born 1970), Spanish adventurer, media personality and politician
