= Elpidio =

Elpidio is a male given name and may refer to following persons:

- Elpídio Barbosa Conceição (born 1974), Brazilian footballer
- Elpidio "Pidi" Barzaga Jr. (born 1950), Filipino politician
- Elpidio Concha (born 1963), Mexican politician
- Elpidio Coppa (1914-1978), Italian footballer
- Elpidio Donizetti, Brazilian jurist
- Elpidio González (1875–1951), Argentine politician
- Elpidio Quirino (1890–1956), Filipino politician and former president of the Philippines
- Elpidio Silva (born 1975), Brazilian footballer
- Elpidio Tovar (born 1949), Mexican politician
- Elpidio Villamin (born 1958), Filipino basketball player

== See also ==
- Elpidius (disambiguation)
- Sant'Elpidio (disambiguation)
