= Garduño =

Garduño is a surname. Notable people with the surname include:

- Eduardo Garduño (born 1928), Mexican footballer
- Miguel Garduño (born 1991), Mexican footballer
- Patricia Garduño (born 1960), Mexican politician
- Felipe Garduño (born 1966), Mexican Engineer

== Other uses ==
Garduño's, a chain of casual dining restaurants serving Mexican and New Mexican cuisine
