= Juan García Costilla =

Mexican politician

- Born: 24 June 1943 (age 82); Guerrero, Mexico
- Occupation: Politician
- Political party: PRD

Juan García Costilla (born 24 June 1943) is a Mexican politician affiliated with the Party of the Democratic Revolution. As of 2014 he served as Deputy of the LIX Legislature of the Mexican Congress as a plurinominal representative.
