= Yolanda Valladares =

Mexican politician

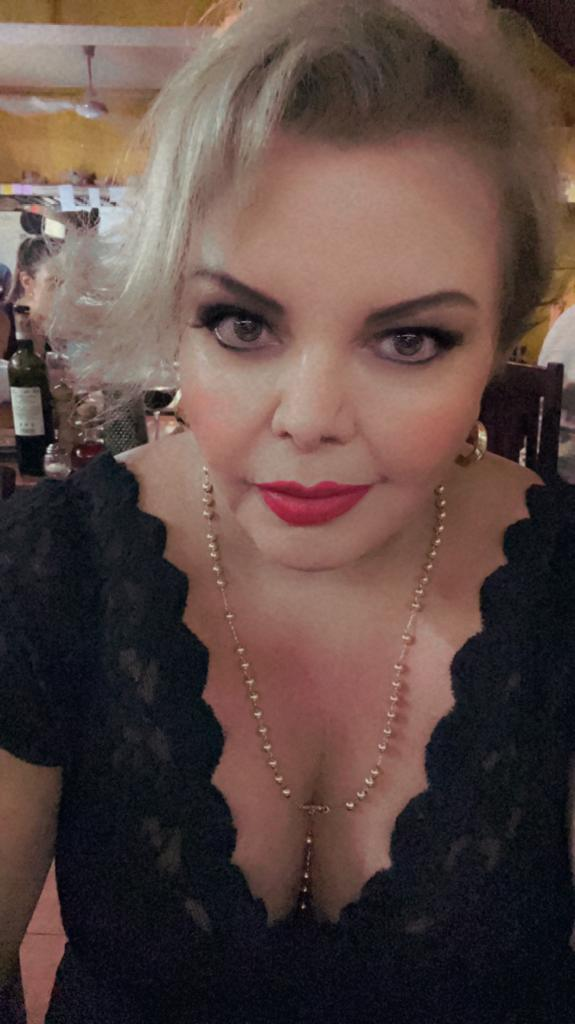
- Born: 20 February 1959 (age 67); Campeche, Mexico
- Occupation: Politician
- Political party: PAN

Yolanda Guadalupe Valladares Valle (born 20 February 1959) is a Mexican politician affiliated with the National Action Party. As of 2014 she served as Deputy of the LIX Legislature of the Mexican Congress as a plurinominal representative. She currently serves as President of the State of Campeche chapter of the National Action Party. Under her mandate the Party won half of the city councils of that State in the 2015 local election.

Known for her strong personality, she is one of the most influential women in the southeastern Mexican region.
