= María Guadalupe Romero Castillo =

Mexican politician

- Born: 3 October 1952 (age 73); Mexico City, Mexico
- Occupation: Politician
- Political party: PAN

María Guadalupe Romero Castillo (born 3 October 1952) is a Mexican politician affiliated with the National Action Party. As of 2014 she served as Senator of the LVIII and LIX Legislatures of the Mexican Congress representing the Federal District and as Deputy of the LIII and LVI Legislatures.
