= Rafael Morgan Álvarez =

Mexican politician

- Born: 22 November 1945 (age 80); Comedero, Sinaloa, Mexico
- Occupation: Politician
- Political party: PAN

Rafael Gilberto Morgan Álvarez (born 22 November 1945) is a Mexican politician affiliated with the National Action Party. He served as Senator of the LVIII and LIX Legislatures of the Mexican Congress representing Baja California and Deputy of the LI and LV Legislatures.
