= Homero Díaz Rodríguez =

Mexican politician

- Born: 2 April 1959 (age 67); Ciudad Victoria, Tamaulipas, Mexico
- Occupation: Politician
- Political party: PRI

Homero Díaz Rodríguez (born 12 April 1959) is a Mexican politician affiliated with the Institutional Revolutionary Party. As of 2014 he served as Deputy of the LIX Legislature of the Mexican Congress as a plurinominal representative.
