= Luis Antonio Ramírez Pineda =

Mexican politician

- Born: 11 June 1970 (age 56); Huajuapan de León, Oaxaca, Mexico
- Education: ITAM; London School of Economics
- Occupation: Politician

Luis Antonio Ramírez Pineda (born 11 June 1970) is a Mexican politician. He served as Deputy of the LIX Legislature of the Mexican Congress as a plurinominal representative.
