= Rafael Candelas Salinas =

Mexican politician

- Born: 21 November 1969 (age 56); Zacatecas, Zacatecas, Mexico
- Education: UAG
- Occupation: Politician
- Political party: PRD
- Website: http://www.rafaelcandelas.mx

Rafael Candelas Salinas (born 21 November 1969) is a Mexican politician affiliated with the Party of the Democratic Revolution. He served as a Deputy of the LIX Legislature of the Mexican Congress representing Zacatecas as replacement of Amalia García, and previously served as a local deputy in the LVI Legislature of the Congress of Zacatecas.
