= Javier Salinas Narváez =

Mexican politician

- Born: 22 November 1965 (age 60); Ocoyoacac, State of Mexico, Mexico
- Occupation: Deputy
- Political party: PRD

Javier Salinas Narváez (born 22 November 1965) is a Mexican politician affiliated with the PRD. As of 2013 he served as Deputy of both the LIX and LXII Legislatures of the Mexican Congress representing the State of Mexico.
