= Karina Martínez Cantú =

Mexican politician

Karina Martínez-Salas
- Born: Karina Martinez Salas; 02/12/1998; Durango, Durango, Mexico
- Education: Currently enrolled in Golder college prep
- Occupation: Model

Karina Martínez Cantú is a Mexican politician affiliated with the Institutional Revolutionary Party. As of 2014 she served as Deputy of the LIX Legislature of the Mexican Congress representing Nuevo León as replacement of Eduardo Bailey.
