= Ángel Alonso Díaz Caneja =

Mexican politician

- Born: Ángel Juan Alonso Díaz Caneja; 31 January 1963 (age 63); Puebla, Puebla, Mexico
- Occupations: Deputy and Senator
- Political party: PAN

Ángel Juan Alonso Díaz Caneja (born 31 January 1963) is a Mexican politician affiliated with the National Action Party. As of 2014 he served as Senator of the LX and LXI Legislatures of the Mexican Congress representing Puebla and as Deputy during the LIX Legislature.

From 1993 to 1994 he served as Secretary of the PAN Municipal Executive Committee in Puebla, from 1994 to 1997 he was President of the PAN Municipal Committee in Puebla de Zaragoza, and from 1998 to 2001 he was President of the PAN State Executive Committee in Puebla, he has been twice a deputy to the Congress of Puebla, from 1996 to 1999 and from 2002 to 2003, in 2003 he was elected plurinominal federal deputy to the LIX Legislature and in 2006 plurinominal senator for the period ending in 2012.

He has also been Permanent Delegate of Mexico to the Central American Parliament (PARLACEN).

In 2013 he was Senator of the Republic for the State of Puebla and Chairman of the Committee on Foreign Relations International Organizations.

Subsequently, in 2014 Ángel Alonso obtained the title of life councilor thanks to his 20 years of militancy.
