= Martín Carrillo Guzmán =

Mexican politician

- Born: 4 January 1963 (age 63); Tepic, Nayarit, Mexico
- Occupation: Politician
- Political party: PRI

Martín Carrillo Guzmán (born 4 January 1963) is a Mexican politician affiliated with the Institutional Revolutionary Party. As of 2014 he served as Deputy of the LIX Legislature of the Mexican Congress as a plurinominal representative.
