= Susana Stephenson =

Mexican politician

- Born: 26 May 1948 (age 77); Veracruz, Veracruz, Mexico
- Occupation: Politician
- Political party: PAN

Susana Stephenson Pérez (born 26 May 1948) is a Mexican politician affiliated with the National Action Party. As of 2014 she served as Senator of the LVIII and LIX Legislatures of the Mexican Congress representing Guanajuato as replacement of Juan Manuel Oliva.
