= Consuelo Muro Urista =

Mexican politician

- Born: 11 September 1963 (age 62); Michoacán, Mexico
- Occupation: Politician
- Political party: PRI

Consuelo Muro Urista (born 11 September 1963) is a Mexican politician affiliated with the Institutional Revolutionary Party. As of 2014 she served as Deputy of the LIX Legislature of the Mexican Congress as a plurinominal representative.
