= Leticia Burgos Ochoa =

Mexican politician

- Born: 24 August 1957 (age 68); Ciudad Obregón, Sonora, Mexico
- Occupation: Politician
- Political party: PRD

Leticia Burgos Ochoa (born 24 August 1957) is a Mexican politician affiliated with the Party of the Democratic Revolution. As of 2014 she served as Senator of the LVIII and LIX Legislatures of the Mexican Congress representing Sonora. She also served as Deputy during the LVI Legislature.
