= Adrián Alanís Quiñones =

Mexican architect and politician

- Born: 5 March 1949 (age 77); Durango, Durango, Mexico
- Occupations: Architect and politician
- Political party: PRI

Adrián Alanís Quiñones (born 5 March 1949) is a Mexican architect and politician affiliated with the Institutional Revolutionary Party. As of 2014 he served as Senator of the LVIII and LIX Legislatures of the Mexican Congress representing Durango.

Adrián Alanís Quiñones is a graduate in architecture from the National Autonomous University of Mexico (UNAM). He served as a local deputy in the LVII Legislature of the Congress of Durango from 1986 to 1989 and as Durango's Secretary of Communications and Public Works from 1998 to 1999.
