= Lorena Torres Ramos =

Mexican politician (born 1968)

- Born: 1 July 1968 (age 57); Jalisco, Mexico
- Education: University of Guadalajara
- Occupation: Politician

Lorena Torres Ramos (born 1 July 1968) is a Mexican politician affiliated with the National Action Party. As of 2014, she served as Deputy of the LIX Legislature of the Mexican Congress as a plurinominal representative.
