= Jaime Miguel Moreno Garavilla =

Mexican lawyer, and politician (born 1957)

- Born: 25 December 1957 (age 68); Mexico City, Mexico
- Education: Universidad Nacional Autónoma de México
- Occupations: Lawyer, physician and politician
- Title: Dr.
- Political party: PRI (1977 a present)

Jaime Miguel Moreno Garavilla (born 25 December 1957) is a Mexican lawyer and politician affiliated with the Institutional Revolutionary Party. He was a federal deputy of the LVII and LIX Legislatures of the Mexican Congress as a plurinominal representative, as well as a local deputy in the Legislative Assembly of the Federal District.
