= Rosa María Avilés Nájera =

Mexican politician

- Born: 31 March 1951 (age 75); Puebla, Puebla, Mexico
- Occupation: Politician
- Political party: PRD (1990s–2013); MC (2013–present)

Rosa María Avilés Nájera (born 31 March 1951) is a Mexican politician affiliated with the Convergence (formerly to the Party of the Democratic Revolution). As of 2014 she served as Deputy of the LIX Legislature of the Mexican Congress as a plurinominal representative.
