= Rita María Esquivel Reyes =

Mexican politician

- Born: 22 May 1946 (age 80); Tepic, Nayarit, Mexico
- Occupation: Politician
- Political party: PAN
- Spouse: José Álvaro Navarro
- Children: Rita M. Navarro, Alvaro Navarro, Gabriela Navarro

Rita María Esquivel Reyes (born 22 May 1946) is a Mexican politician affiliated with the National Action Party. She served as Senator of the LVIII and LIX Legislatures of the Mexican Congress representing Nayarit. She also served in the XXV Legislature of the Congress of Nayarit.
