= Samuel Rodríguez Sánchez =

Mexican politician

- Born: 17 February 1942 (age 84); Sinaloa, Mexico
- Occupation: Politician
- Political party: PRI

Héctor Samuel Rodríguez Sánchez (born 17 February 1942) is a Mexican politician affiliated with the Institutional Revolutionary Party. He served as Deputy of the LIX Legislature of the Mexican Congress representing Sinaloa as replacement of Antonio Astiazarán, and then served as municipal president of Empalme, Sonora from 2006 to 2009.
