= Marcelo Herrera Herbert =

Mexican politician

- Born: 23 May 1947 (age 79); Pánuco, Veracruz, Mexico
- Occupation: Politician
- Political party: PRD

Marcelo Herrera Herbert (born 23 May 1947) is a Mexican politician affiliated with the Party of the Democratic Revolution. He served as Deputy of the LIX Legislature of the Mexican Congress as a plurinominal representative.
