= Bernardo Loera Carrillo =

Mexican politician

- Born: 20 August 1971 (age 54); Durango, Mexico
- Occupation: Politician
- Political party: PAN

Bernardo Loera Carrillo (born 20 August 1971) is a Mexican politician affiliated with the National Action Party. As of 2014 he served as Deputy of the LIX Legislature of the Mexican Congress as a plurinominal representative.
