= José Adolfo Murat =

Mexican politician

- Born: State of Mexico, Mexico
- Occupation: Politician

José Adolfo Murat Macías is a Mexican politician affiliated with the Institutional Revolutionary Party (PRI). As of 2003 he served as Deputy of the LIX Legislature of the Mexican Congress as a plurinominal representative from the State of Mexico (Estado de Mexico). He finished his tenure in 2006.
