= Israel Gallardo Sevilla =

Mexican politician

- Born: 30 November 1971 (age 54); State of Mexico, Mexico
- Occupation: Politician
- Political party: PAN

Israel Raymundo Gallardo Sevilla (born 30 November 1971) is a Mexican politician affiliated with the National Action Party. As of 2014 he served as Deputy of the LIX Legislature of the Mexican Congress representing Puebla.
