= Gisela Lara Saldaña =

Mexican politician

- Born: September 18, 1956 (age 69); Tula, Tamaulipas, Mexico

Gisela Juliana Lara Saldaña (born September 18, 1956) is a Mexican politician that has held diverse positions in Mexico, actively. She is the National holder of the IMSS-BIENESTAR Program.

== Biography ==
Lara Saldaña completed her degree as a Medical Surgeon in the University of Northeast in Tampico, Tamaulipas, and specialized in Hospital Administration in the school of Public Health in Mexico.

In her administrative medical activity she worked as a Medical specialist of the group in IMSS-Coplamar (actively IMSS-BIENESTAR) of Tamaulipas; Coordinator of investigation in the maternal child group of IMSS; a zonal medical adviser of the IMSS in Tamaulipas. She also worked in the Secretary of Health of San Luis Potosi as the Head of department of jurisdictional support coordination, Head of the office of the maternal and child health program, Head of the Health jurisdiction of Matehuala. From 1991 to 2003 she served as a Treasurer of the medical society of Tula, Tamaulipas.

In her political trajectory there are highlights in positions like: president of organizing commission and the Municipal management committee in Tula, Tamaulipas. In 2003 she was sworn in as a local representative through LIX Legislature of the Mexican Congress, during which she integrated the following commissions: Health, Social Security, Equity and gender, special for the basin of Burgos and the special to follow up the funds of the Mexican farm laborers.

After initiating her professional trajectory in 1982 in the IMSS-COPLAMAR program (Previously IMSS-Solidaridad, IMSS-Oportunidades, IMSS-PROSPERA and actively IMSS-BIENESTAR), she joined the Headquarters in 2007 as Coordinator of community actions.

As of December 1, Lara Saldaña assumes the position, national holder of the IMSS-PROSPERA program, with the entrance of the administration of President AndresManuel Lopez Obrador, position that is held up to date.

IMSS-PROSPERA is a program of the federal administrative government by the Mexican Institute of Social Security, responsible for providing medical services to the most vulnerable population in the country living in marginalized rural or urban areas, has a presence in 28 states and its infrastructure includes:

- 80 Rural Hospitals (second level of care)
- 3,616 Rural Medical Units (first level of care)
- 315 Urban Medical Units
- 143 Mobile Medical Units
- 46 Obstetric Rural Care Centers
