= Ramón Mota Sánchez =

Mexican politician

- Born: 22 August 1922; Mexico City, Mexico
- Died: 15 February 2013 (aged 90)
- Occupations: Militar and politician
- Political party: PRI

Ramón Mota Sánchez (22 August 1922 – 15 February 2013) was a Mexican politician and retired general affiliated with the Institutional Revolutionary Party. He served as Senator of the LVIII and LIX Legislatures of the Mexican Congress representing the Federal District and as Deputy of the LV and LVII Legislatures.
