= Elpidius =

Elpidius is a Roman cognomen.

It was the name of several bishops and saints:

- Elpidius, bishop of Huesca (c.522-546)
- Elpidius, bishop of Tarazona
- Elpidius, bishop of Comana (Cappadocia)
- Saint Elpidius, bishop of Lyon
- Saint Elpidius the Cappadocian, abbot and patron saint of Sant'Elpidio a Mare
- Elpidius (rebel), 8th-century Byzantine governor of Sicily and rebel
- another name for St. Expeditus

== See also ==
- Elpidio (disambiguation)
- Sant'Elpidio (disambiguation)
