= Leonel Sandoval Figueroa =

Mexican jurist and politician

- Born: 12 March 1949 (age 77); Guadalajara, Jalisco, Mexico
- Occupations: Jurist and politician
- Political party: PRI

Jorge Leonel Sandoval Figueroa (born 12 March 1949) is a Mexican jurist and politician affiliated with the Institutional Revolutionary Party. From 1 September 2003 to 31 August 2006 he served as Deputy of the LIX Legislature of the Mexican Congress representing Jalisco.
