= María Talavera Hernández =

Mexican politician

- Born: 18 March 1964 (age 62)
- Occupation: Politician
- Political party: PAN

María Eloísa Talavera Hernández (Note: In this Mexican name, the surname is Talavera and the second or maternal family name is Hernández.) (born 18 March 1964) is a Mexican politician affiliated with the National Action Party (PAN).

In the 2003 mid-terms, she was elected to a plurinominal seat in the Chamber of Deputies for the 59th session of Congress. She returned to Congress for a second term as a plurinominal deputy in the 2015 mid-terms.
