= Sant'Elpidio =

Sant'Elpidio (Italian for Saint Elpidius) may refer to a pair of Italian municipalities in the province of Fermo, Marche:

- Sant'Elpidio a Mare
- Porto Sant'Elpidio

== See also ==
- Elpidius (disambiguation) and Elpidio (disambiguation)
