= Ariel Córdova Wilson =

Mexican politician

- Born: Campeche, Mexico
- Occupation: Politician
- Political party: PRI (2000s – 2014); PVEM (2014 – present)

Ariel Córdova Wilson is a Mexican politician affiliated with the Ecologist Green Party of Mexico. As of 2014 he served as Deputy of the LIX Legislature of the Mexican Congress as a plurinominal representative as replacement of Alejandro Moreno Cárdenas.
