= Guillermo Zúñiga Martínez =

Mexican politician (1942–2015)

Guillermo Héctor Zúñiga Martínez (December 18, 1942 – April 23, 2015) was a Mexican politician and member of the Institutional Revolutionary Party (PRI) who served in the Mexican Chamber of Deputies for the fifth district of Veracruz.

== Professional career ==
Zúñiga founded and was the first president of the oratory institute "Belisario Domínguez" in his native Veracruz. He worked as a professor of history and civics at the Hidalgo junior high school, Erasmo Castellanos Quinto high school, at a Sephardic school, and at the National Youth Institute (INJUVE).

After finishing his law degree at the National Autonomous University of Mexico (UNAM), he worked as a consulting lawyer in the Directorate of Legal Subjects of the Secretariat of the Interior, as a consulting lawyer in the Directorate of Legal Affairs of the Presidency and as the state director of education, the youngest ever, during the governorship of Rafael Hernández Ochoa. He updated the education law and created the Centers of Higher Studies of Rural Education, the Veracruz Pedagogical University and the Institute of Pedagogical Normalization.

He was appointed as the Minister of Education and Culture of Veracruz under Governor Fernando Gutiérrez Barrios and again under Patricio Chirinos Calero, and resigned to make what would be a successful run for municipal president of Xalapa, the state capital. He further continued his political career by serving as a local and federal Congressman. While in the local Congress, Zúñiga was the speaker of the congress, and president of the legislative branch of government in Veracruz. He served in the 56th Congress.

He managed the campaign of presidential candidate Roberto Madrazo in Veracruz and the gubernatorial campaign of Fidel Herrera. He also headed the state committee of the Institutional Revolutionary Party (PRI).

From 2011 until his death, he fought hard to create a new university in the state of Veracruz, named the Universidad Popular Autónoma de Veracruz (UPAV), and became its founding rector. However, the UPAV has been dogged with concerns about the validity of its degrees. In 2014, the Oaxaca state government warned that UPAV degrees were not valid outside of the state of Veracruz. In 2013, a group of UPAV alumni in Coatzacoalcos publicly claimed that since universities were not accepting UPAV degrees and coursework, the institution was defrauding students.

Zúñiga was survived by his wife Guillermina, and his children, Grecia María Zúñiga Pérez, Américo (the current municipal president of Xalapa), Guillermo and Anilú Zúñiga Martínez.

== See also ==
- 1988 Veracruz state election

Preceded by Martín Fernández Ávila	Municipal President of Xalapa, Veracruz; 1988–1991	Succeeded by Armando Méndez de la Luz
