= Lucio Galileo Lastra Marín =

Mexican politician

National Action Party candidate for Governor of Tabasco
- Election date 2001

Personal details
- Born: June 20, 1951 (age 74)
- Party: National Action Party
- Occupation: Physician, Politician

Lucio Galileo Lastra-Marín (born June 20, 1951) is a Mexican doctor and politician who is a member of the National Action Party (PAN). He has been Federal Representative (Diputado Federal) and Candidate to Governor for Tabasco.

He studied medicine at the Medical School (Facultad de Medicina) of the National Autonomous University of Mexico (UNAM) and has a master's degree in Public Health from the Public Health School of the Health Secretary. He has worked in different positions in the UNAM and he was Hospital Director for the Health Secretary for Ocosingo and Yajalón, Chiapas. He became involved in politics as member of the State Committee of Tabasco, Candidate to Mayor (Presidente Municipal) in 2000 and Candidate to be Governor of Tabasco in the extraordinary elections of 2001. From 2003 to 2006 he was Federal Representative (Diputado Federal) at the LIX Legislative Assembly.

In 2006 he joined the Health Secretary as head of the Office for Social Liaisons, under the command of María de los Ángeles Fromow.
