= Guillermo Martínez Nolasco =

Mexican retired general and politician

- Born: 21 August 1939 (age 86); Mazatlán, Sinaloa, Mexico
- Occupations: Retired general and politician
- Political party: PRI

Guillermo Martínez Nolasco (born 21 August 1939) is a Mexican retired general and politician affiliated with the Institutional Revolutionary Party. As of 2014 he served as Deputy of the LIX Legislature of the Mexican Congress as a plurinominal representative.
