= Eduardo Alfonso Sánchez Hernández =

Mexican politician

- Born: 30 October 1946 (age 78); Tamiahua, Veracruz, Mexico
- Occupation: Politician

Eduardo Alfonso Sánchez Hernández (born 30 October 1946) is a Mexican politician serving as Deputy of the LIX Legislature of the Mexican Congress and representing Veracruz. He was formerly affiliated with the Institutional Revolutionary Party.
