= Tomás Vázquez Vigil =

Mexican politician (born 1944)

- Born: 30 August 1944 (age 81); Guadalajara, Jalisco, Mexico
- Occupation: Politician
- Political party: PRI

Tomás Vázquez Vigil (born 30 August 1944) is a Mexican politician affiliated with the Institutional Revolutionary Party. As of 2014 he served as Senator of the LVIII and LIX Legislatures of the Mexican Congress representing Jalisco.
