= Norma Sotelo Ochoa =

Mexican politician

- Born: 25 October 1963 (age 62); Cuencamé, Durango, Mexico
- Occupation: Politician
- Political party: PRI

Norma Elizabeth Sotelo Ochoa (born 25 October 1963) is a Mexican politician affiliated with the Institutional Revolutionary Party. She served as federal deputy of the LIX Legislature of the Mexican Congress as a plurinominal representative, as well as a local deputy in the LXI Legislature of the Congress of Durango. She also served as municipal president of Cuencamé from 1995 to 1998.
