= Blanca Amelia Gámez =

Mexican politician

- Born: 25 August 1950 (age 75); Chihuahua, Mexico
- Education: UACH
- Occupation: Politician
- Political party: PAN

Blanca Amelia Gámez Gutiérrez (born 25 August 1950) is a Mexican politician affiliated with the National Action Party. She served as Deputy of the LIX Legislature of the Mexican Congress as a plurinominal representative, and previously served in the LIX Legislature of the Congress of Chihuahua.
