= Sheyla Aragón =

Mexican politician

- Born: 27 July 1976 (age 49); State of Mexico, Mexico
- Occupation: Politician
- Political party: PAN

Sheyla Fabiola Aragón Cortés (born 27 July 1976) is a Mexican politician affiliated with the National Action Party. As of 2014 she served as Deputy of the LIX Legislature of the Mexican Congress as a plurinominal representative.
