= Manuel Pérez Cárdenas =

Mexican economist and politician

- Born: 30 November 1953 (age 72); Tepic, Nayarit, Mexico
- Occupations: Economist and politician
- Political party: PAN

Manuel Pérez Cárdenas (Note: In this Spanish name, the first or paternal surname is Pérez and the second or maternal family name is Cárdenas.) (born 30 November 1953) is a Mexican economist, former consul and politician affiliated with the National Action Party (PAN). He is a native of Tepic, Nayarit.

Pérez Cárdenas was consul general of Mexico in Houston, United States, from 1995 to 2000.

In the 2003 mid-term election, he was elected to a plurinominal seat in the Chamber of Deputies for the 59th Congress.
