= José Carmen Alcántara =

Mexican politician

José Carmen Arturo Alcántara Rojas
- Born: 16 July 1959 (age 66); Acambay, State of Mexico, Mexico
- Occupation: Politician
- Political party: PRI

José Carmen Arturo Alcántara Rojas (born 16 July 1959) is a Mexican politician affiliated with the Institutional Revolutionary Party. As of 2014 he served as Deputy of the LIX Legislature of the Mexican Congress as a plurinominal representative.
