= Aníbal Peralta Galicia =

Mexican politician

- Born: 13 July 1947 (age 78); Orizaba, Veracruz, Mexico
- Occupation: Politician
- Political party: PRI

Aníbal Peralta Galicia (born 13 July 1947) is a Mexican politician affiliated with the Institutional Revolutionary Party. As of 2014 he served as Deputy of the LIX Legislature of the Mexican Congress as a plurinominal representative.
