= César Amín González Orantes =

Mexican politician

- Born: 1 April 1961 (age 65); Tapachula, Chiapas, Mexico
- Education: Autonomous University of Chiapas
- Occupation: Politician
- Political party: PRI

César Amín González Orantes (born 1 April 1961) is a Mexican politician affiliated with the Institutional Revolutionary Party. As of 2014 he served as Deputy of the LIX Legislature of the Mexican Congress representing Chiapas.
