= Lamberto Díaz Nieblas =

Mexican politician

- Born: 27 August 1954 (age 71); Cocorit Rio Yaki, Sonora, Mexico
- Education: Unison
- Occupation: Politician
- Political party: PRI

José Lamberto Díaz Nieblas (born 27 August 1954) is a Mexican politician formerly affiliated with the Institutional Revolutionary Party. He served as Deputy of the LIX Legislature of the Mexican Congress representing Sonora and previously served in the LVI Legislature of the Congress of Sonora.
