= Abraham Bagdadi =

Mexican politician

- Born: 29 March 1963 (age 63); Campeche, Campeche, Mexico
- Occupation: Politician
- Political party: PRD
- Spouse: María del Carmen Pérez López

Abraham Bagdadi Estrella (born 29 March 1963) is a Mexican politician affiliated with the Party of the Democratic Revolution. He served as federal deputy of the LVII and LIX Legislatures of the Mexican Congress as a plurinominal representative, as well as a local deputy in the Congress of Colima.
