= Rogelio Franco Castán =

Mexican politician

- Born: 19 November 1975 (age 50); Veracruz, Mexico
- Occupation: Politician
- Political party: PRD

Rogelio Franco Castán (born 19 November 1975) is a Mexican politician affiliated with the Party of the Democratic Revolution. As of 2014 he served as Deputy of the LIX Legislature of the Mexican Congress as a plurinominal representative.
