= Carlos Chaurand =

Mexican lawyer and politician

- Born: 7 July 1951 (age 74); Celaya, Guanajuato, Mexico
- Occupations: Lawyer and politician
- Political party: PRI

Carlos Chaurand Arzate (born 7 July 1951) is a Mexican lawyer and politician affiliated with the Institutional Revolutionary Party. As of 2014 he served as Senator of the LVIII and LIX Legislatures of the Mexican Congress representing Guanajuato and as Deputy of the LX Legislature.
