= María Arias Staines =

Mexican politician

- Born: 27 December 1941 (age 84)
- Occupation: Politician
- Political party: PVEM

María de la Luz Arias Staines (born 27 December 1941) is a Mexican politician affiliated with the Ecologist Green Party of Mexico. As of 2014 she served as Deputy of the LIX Legislature of the Mexican Congress as a plurinominal representative.
