= María Corella Manzanilla =

Mexican politician

- Born: 5 October 1939 (age 86); Magdalena de Kino, Sonora, Mexico
- Occupation: Politician
- Political party: PAN

María Viola Corella Manzanilla (born 5 October 1939) is a Mexican politician affiliated with the National Action Party. She served as Deputy of the LIX Legislature of the Mexican Congress as a plurinominal representative after having previously served in the Congress of Sonora.
