= Felipe de Jesús Díaz González =

Mexican politician

- Born: 9 February 1965 (age 61); Puebla, Mexico
- Occupation: Politician
- Political party: PAN

Felipe de Jesús Díaz González (born 9 February 1965) is a Mexican politician affiliated with the National Action Party. As of 2014 he served as Deputy of the LIX Legislature of the Mexican Congress as a plurinominal representative.
