= Evangelina Pérez Zaragoza =

Mexican politician

- Born: 2 August 1950 (age 75); Vista Hermosa, Michoacán, Mexico
- Occupation: Politician
- Political party: National Action Party

Evangelina Pérez Zaragoza (born 2 August 1950) is a Mexican politician affiliated with the National Action Party. As of 2014 she served as Deputy of the LIX Legislature of the Mexican Congress as a plurinominal representative.
