= Laura Elena Martínez Rivera =

Mexican politician

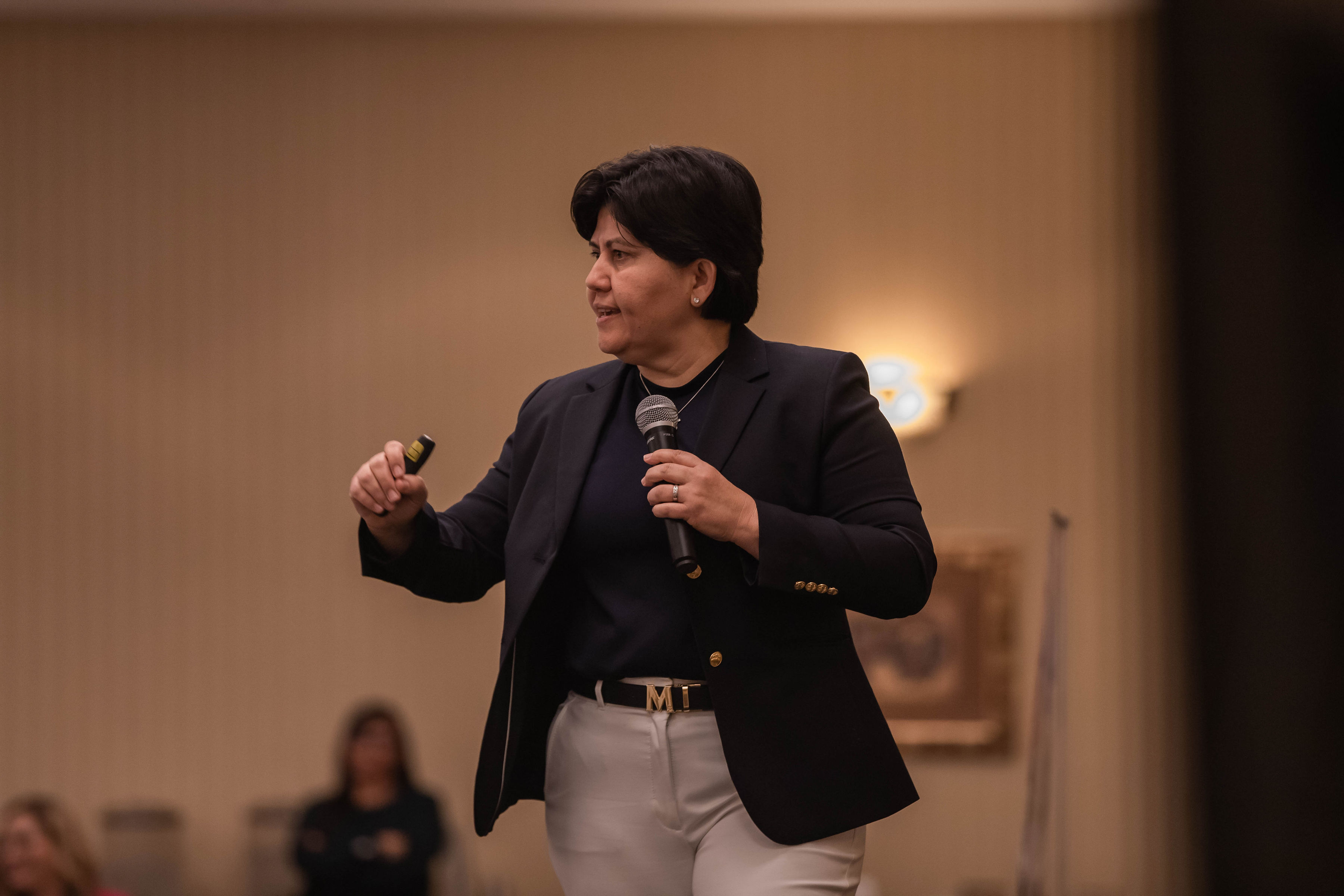
- Martinez in 2022
- Born: 13 May 1953 (age 73); Monterrey, Nuevo León, Mexico
- Occupation: Politician
- Political party: PRI

Laura Elena Martínez Rivera (born 13 May 1953) is a Mexican politician affiliated with the Institutional Revolutionary Party. As of 2014 she served as Deputy of the LIX Legislature of the Mexican Congress as a plurinominal representative.
