= María Elyd Sáenz =

Mexican politician

- Born: Durango, Mexico
- Occupation: Politician
- Political party: PAN

María Salomé Elyd Sáenz is a Mexican politician affiliated with the National Action Party. As of 2014 she served as Deputy of the LIX Legislature of the Mexican Congress as a plurinominal representative as replacement of Juan de Dios Castro Lozano.
