= Rómulo Cárdenas =

Mexican politician

- Born: 6 July 1956 (age 69); Veracruz, Mexico
- Education: UNAM
- Occupation: Politician
- Political party: PAN

Rómulo Cárdenas Vélez (born 6 July 1956) is a Mexican politician affiliated with the National Action Party. As of 2014, he served as Deputy of the LIX Legislature of the Mexican Congress as a plurinominal representative.
