= Francisco Xavier Alvarado =

Mexican politician

- Born: 23 September 1978 (age 47); Campeche, Mexico
- Occupation: Politician
- Political party: PVEM

Francisco Xavier Alvarado Villazón (born 23 September 1978) was an elected Mexican Congressman from 2003 to 2009, he was affiliated with the Ecologist Green Party of Mexico before his resignation in 2006, after which he became an independent representative. He served as Congressman of the LIX Legislature of the Mexican Congress as a plurinominal representative. And later since 2006, as Congressman for the Federal District in Mexico. He holds a Master's degree from the Massachusetts Institute of Technology.
