= Serafín Ríos Álvarez =

Mexican politician

- Born: 20 July 1959 (age 67); Tangamandapio, Michoacán, Mexico
- Occupation: Politician
- Political party: PRD

Serafín Ríos Álvarez (born 20 July 1959) is a Mexican politician affiliated with the Party of the Democratic Revolution. As of 2014 he served as Senator of the LVIII and LIX Legislatures of the Mexican Congress representing Michoacán.
