= Víctor Félix Flores Morales =

Mexican trade union leader and politician

- Born: 6 March 1939 (age 87); Veracruz, Veracruz, Mexico
- Education: Universidad Veracruzana
- Occupations: Trade union leader and politician
- Political party: PRI

Víctor Félix Flores Morales (born 6 March 1939) is a Mexican trade union leader and politician affiliated with the Institutional Revolutionary Party (PRI).

Flores Morales was born in the city of Veracruz and holds a bachelor's degree in accounting from the Universidad Veracruzana. In 1960 he began working for Ferrocarriles Nacionales de México, where he joined the Union of Railway Workers of the Mexican Republic (STFRM); between 1991 and 1994 he was union's treasurer.

He has been elected to the Chamber of Deputies as a plurinominal deputy on two occasions: in the 1997 mid-terms, for the 57th session of Congress (1997–2000), and in the 2003 mid-terms, for the 59th session (2003–2006).
