= Marco Antonio Xicoténcatl =

Mexican physician and politician

- Born: 21 January 1955 (age 71); Mexico City, Mexico
- Education: UNAM; UAEM
- Occupations: Physician and politician
- Political party: PAN
- Website: http://www.xicotencatl.mx/

Marco Antonio Xicoténcatl Reynoso (born 21 January 1955) is a Mexican physician and politician affiliated with the National Action Party. He served as Senator of the LVIII and LIX Legislatures of the Mexican Congress representing Morelos, and previously served as a local deputy in the XLVII Legislature of the Congress of Morelos.
