= Marbella Casanova =

Mexican politician

- Born: 16 May 1958 (age 68); Muna, Yucatán, Mexico
- Occupation: Politician
- Political party: PRD

Marbella Casanova Calam (born 16 May 1958) is a Mexican politician affiliated with the Party of the Democratic Revolution. As of 2014 she served as Deputy of the LIX Legislature of the Mexican Congress as a plurinominal representative.

On December 6, 2006 she registered as her party's pre-candidate for the governorship of Yucatan for the 2007 elections, although the PRD later tried to nominate former PAN candidate Ana Rosa Payán and when this candidacy was rejected and the PRD announced that it would run alone, Marbella Casanova announced the withdrawal of her pre-candidacy.
