= Alejandra Méndez Salorio =

Mexican politician

- Born: 12 June 1982 (age 43); Mexico City, Mexico
- Occupation: Politician
- Political party: PVEM

Alejandra Méndez Salorio (born 12 June 1982) is a Mexican politician affiliated with the Ecologist Green Party of Mexico. As of 2014 she served as Deputy of the LIX Legislature of the Mexican Congress as a plurinominal representative.
