= Jorge Legorreta Ordorica =

Mexican politician

- Born: 15 December 1970 (age 55); Mexico City, Mexico
- Occupations: Senator and Deputy
- Political party: PVEM

Jorge Legorreta Ordorica (born 15 December 1970) is a Mexican politician affiliated with the PVEM. He served as Deputy of the LIX Legislature of the Mexican Congress representing the Federal District. He also served as Senator during the LX and LXI Legislatures.
