= Juan Fernando Perdomo =

Mexican politician

- Born: 27 January 1957 (age 69); Córdoba, Veracruz, Mexico
- Education: ITESM
- Occupations: Engineer and politician
- Political party: MC
- Children: Juan Gerardo y Fernando
- Family: Marycarmen Abella O

Juan Fernando Perdomo Bueno (born 27 January 1957) is a Mexican politician affiliated with the Citizens' Movement. As of 2014 he served as Deputy of the LIX Legislature of the Mexican Congress as a plurinominal representative.
