= Blanca Eppen =

Mexican politician

- Born: 13 April 1950 (age 76); Torreón, Coahuila, Mexico
- Occupation: Politician
- Political party: PAN

Blanca Eppen Canales (born 13 April 1950) is a Mexican politician affiliated with the National Action Party. As of 2014 she served as Deputy of the LIX Legislature of the Mexican Congress in a proportional representation.
