= José Manuel Carrillo Rubio =

Mexican politician (born 1975)

José Manuel Carrillo
- Born: 10 November 1975 (age 50); Jalisco, Mexico
- Education: University of Guadalajara; Universidad Panamericana
- Occupation: Politician
- Political party: PRI

José Manuel Carrillo Rubio (born 10 November 1975) is a Mexican politician affiliated with the Institutional Revolutionary Party. He served as Deputy of the LIX Legislature of the Mexican Congress representing Jalisco, and previously served in the LVI Legislature of the Congress of Jalisco.
