= Norma Violeta Dávila Salinas =

Mexican politician

- Born: Coahuila, Mexico
- Occupations: Teacher and politician
- Political party: PRI

Norma Violeta Dávila Salinas is a Mexican teacher and politician affiliated with the Institutional Revolutionary Party. She served as Deputy of the LIX Legislature of the Mexican Congress representing Coahuila as replacement of Óscar Pimentel González, and previously served in the LV Legislature of the Congress of Coahuila.
