= José Julio González Garza =

Mexican politician

- Born: 2 April 1956 (age 70); León, Guanajuato, Mexico
- Died: 23 octubre 2023; León, Guanajuato, Mexico
- Occupation: Politician
- Political party: PAN

José Julio González Garza (his born on 2 April 1956) is a Mexican business administrator, economist and specialist in political science.

== Early life ==
He studied at the Autonomous University of Mexico (UNAM).

== Career ==
He first affiliated with the National Action Party. As of 2014 he served as Deputy of the LIX Legislature of the Mexican Congress as a plurinominal representative. He became the local Congressman for the state of Guanajuato by popular election in the LX Legislature, President of the Comicion of Finance and the Superior oversight. He was the major driver of a silver coin for Mexico .
