= Javier Osorio Salcido =

Mexican politician

- Born: 1 March 1959 (age 67); Sinaloa, Mexico
- Occupation: Politician
- Political party: PAN

José Javier Osorio Salcido (born 1 March 1959) is a Mexican politician affiliated with the National Action Party. As of 2014 he served as Deputy of the LIX Legislature of the Mexican Congress as a plurinominal representative.
