= Margarita Chávez Murguía =

Mexican architect and politician

- Born: 5 June 1959 (age 66); Uruapan, Michoacán, Mexico
- Occupation: Politician
- Political party: PAN

Margarita del Sagrado Corazón de Jesús Chávez Murguía (born 5 June 1959) is a Mexican architect and politician affiliated with the National Action Party. She served as Deputy of the LVII and LIX Legislatures of the Mexican Congress as a plurinominal representative.
