= María Jaspeado =

Mexican politician

- Born: 20 May 1967 (age 59); State of Mexico, Mexico
- Occupation: Politician
- Political party: PAN

María del Rocío Jaspeado Villanueva (born 20 May 1967) is a Mexican politician affiliated with the National Action Party. As of 2014 she served as Deputy of the LIX Legislature of the Mexican Congress as a plurinominal representative.
