= Guillermo Velasco Rodríguez =

Mexican politician

- Born: 17 November 1976 (age 49); Mexico, Mexico
- Education: Universidad Iberoamericana
- Occupation: Politician
- Political party: PVEM

Guillermo Velasco Rodríguez (born 17 November 1976) was a Mexican politician affiliated with the Ecologist Green Party of Mexico. As of 2003 he served as Deputy of the LIX Legislature of the Mexican Congress as a plurinominal representative.
