= Micaela Aguilar =

Mexican politician (born 1955)

Micaela Aguilar González
- Born: 29 September 1955 (age 70); Axapusco, State of Mexico, Mexico
- Occupation: Politician
- Political party: PAN

Micaela Aguilar González (born 29 September 1955) is a Mexican politician affiliated with the National Action Party. As of 2014, she served as Senator of the LVIII and LIX Legislatures of the Mexican Congress representing the State of Mexico.
