= María Rodríguez de Alba =

Mexican politician

- Born: 24 October 1959 (age 66); Aguascalientes, Aguascalientes, Mexico
- Occupation: Politician
- Political party: PRI

María del Consuelo Rafaela Rodríguez de Alba (born 24 October 1959) is a Mexican politician affiliated with the Institutional Revolutionary Party. As of 2014 she served as Deputy of the LIX Legislature of the Mexican Congress as a plurinominal representative.
