= Tomás Cruz Martínez =

Mexican politician

- Born: 21 December 1959 (age 66); State of Mexico, Mexico
- Occupation: Politician
- Political party: PRD

Tomás Cruz Martínez (born 21 December 1959) is a Mexican politician affiliated with the Party of the Democratic Revolution. As of 2014 he served as Deputy of the LIX Legislature of the Mexican Congress as a plurinominal representative.
