= Luis Alberto Rico =

Mexican engineer and politician

- Born: 9 November 1938 (age 87); Mexico City, Mexico
- Education: ITESM; UANL
- Occupations: Engineer and politician
- Political party: PAN

Luis Alberto Rico Samaniego (born 9 November 1938) is a Mexican engineer and politician affiliated with the National Action Party. As of 2014 he served as Senator of the LVIII and LIX Legislatures of the Mexican Congress representing Coahuila and as Deputy during the LVI Legislature.
