= Addy García López =

Mexican politician

- Born: 10 November 1958 (age 67); Villahermosa, Tabasco, Mexico
- Occupation: Politician
- Political party: PRI

Addy García López (born 10 November 1958) is a Mexican politician affiliated with the Institutional Revolutionary Party. As of 2014 she served as Deputy of the LIX Legislature of the Mexican Congress as a plurinominal representative.
