= Janette Ovando =

Mexican politician

- Born: 27 October 1977 (age 48); Chiapas, Mexico
- Occupation: Politician
- Political party: PAN

Janette Ovando Reazola (born 27 October 1977) is a Mexican politician affiliated with the National Action Party. She served as Deputy of the LIX Legislature and the LXIII Legislature of the Mexican Congress as a plurinominal representative from Chiapas.

In 2016, she became President of the State Steering Committee of the National Action Party in the State of Chiapas. However, in May 2018, Ovando was dismissed from this position due to irregularities and misuse of Party funds. It is alleged that, during her tenure, she diverted up to 11 million pesos of party funds to an evangelical church based in Florida, the King Of Glory International Ministries, which she is part of. Ovando also filled the party with close friends from her religious congregation who had nothing to do with the PAN, and put them on the party's payroll. Under her leadership, PAN militancy dropped in Chiapas, and all municipal committees of the National Action Party in Chiapas were closed.
