= Luis Eduardo Espinosa Pérez =

Mexican politician

- Born: 27 June 1956 (age 70); Mexico City, Mexico
- Education: UNAM
- Occupation: Politician
- Political party: PRD

Luis Eduardo Espinosa Pérez (27 June 1956 - 7 April 2023) was a Mexican politician affiliated with the Party of the Democratic Revolution. He served as Deputy of the LIX Legislature of the Mexican Congress as a plurinominal representative.
