= Raymundo Gómez Flores =

Mexican politician (born 1952)

- Born: Omar Raymundo Gómez Flores; 24 June 1952 (age 73); Guadalajara, Jalisco, Mexico
- Occupation: Politician
- Political party: PRI
- Relatives: Altagracia Gómez Sierra (daughter)

Omar Raymundo Gómez Flores (born 24 June 1952) is a Mexican politician affiliated with the Institutional Revolutionary Party. As of 2014 he served as Senator of the LVIII and LIX Legislatures of the Mexican Congress representing Jalisco.
