= Luis Antonio González Roldán =

Mexican politician

- Born: 26 February 1967 (age 59); Mexico City, Mexico
- Occupation: Deputy
- Political party: PANAL

Luis Antonio González Roldán (born 26 February 1967) is a Mexican politician affiliated with the PANAL. As of 2013 he served as Deputy of both the LIX and LXII Legislatures of the Mexican Congress representing the State of Mexico.
