= Yvette Salazar =

Mexican politician (born 1979)

- Born: 31 July 1979 (age 46); Guadalajara, Jalisco, Mexico
- Occupation: Politician
- Political party: PVEM

Yvette Salazar Torres (born 31 July 1979) is a Mexican politician affiliated with the Ecologist Green Party of Mexico. As of 2014 she served as deputy of the LIX Legislature of the Mexican Congress as a plurinominal representative.
