= Sergio Arturo Posadas Lara =

Mexican politician

- Born: 12 August 1963 (age 63); Ciudad Madero, Tamaulipas, Mexico
- Education: Autonomous University of Tamaulipas
- Occupation: Politician
- Political party: PRI

Sergio Arturo Posadas Lara (born 12 August 1963) is a Mexican politician affiliated with the Institutional Revolutionary Party. As of 2014 he served as Deputy of the LIX Legislature of the Mexican Congress as a plurinominal representative.
