= Salvador Becerra Rodríguez =

Mexican politician

- Born: 20 January 1946 (age 80); Poncitlán, Jalisco, Mexico
- Occupation: Politician
- Political party: PAN

Salvador Becerra Rodríguez (born 20 January 1946) is a Mexican politician affiliated with the National Action Party. As of 2014 he served as Senator of the LVIII and LIX Legislatures of the Mexican Congress representing Jalisco and as Deputy during the LVI Legislature.
