= Yolanda Peniche Blanco =

Mexican politician

- Born: 26 April 1969 (age 57); Yucatán, Mexico
- Education: Universidad Mesoamericana de San Agustín
- Occupation: Politician
- Political party: PAN

Yolanda Leticia Peniche Blanco (born 26 April 1969) is a Mexican politician affiliated with the National Action Party. She served as Deputy of the LIX Legislature of the Mexican Congress as a plurinominal representative.
