= Marco Antonio García Ayala =

Mexican politician

- Born: 24 August 1962 (age 63); Mexicali, Baja California, Mexico
- Occupation: Politician
- Political party: Institutional Revolutionary Party

Marco Antonio García Ayala (born 24 August 1962) is a Mexican politician affiliated with the Institutional Revolutionary Party. He is a federal deputy representing Baja California and the first electoral region in the LXIII Legislature of the Mexican Congress.

== Life ==
Much of García Ayala's political career has taken place in the National Union of Workers of the Secretariat of Health (SNTSA). In 1981, he began working in the SNTSA and in the Baja California public health system, as he pursued a degree in law from the Universidad Autónoma de Baja California. In 1985, he was a member of the executive committee of the union's Section 42, and in 1986, he became the first vice president of another union, the Federation of Unions of Workers at the Service of the State (FSTSE). He continued his involvement in the SNTSA, primarily as a secretary in various capacities, as well as the FSTSE, where he was the secretary of social assistance between 1992 and 1995.

Though he joined the Institutional Revolutionary Party (PRI) in 1989, García Ayala's first involvement with the PRI came by way of the SNTSA, when he coordinated the SNTSA's support for the PRI in the 1994 presidential campaign and did the same for district-level campaigns in Baja California in 1997.

The late 1990s and early 2000s saw García Ayala continue with his dual track of SNTSA and FSTSE positions. Between 1998 and 2004, he served as the FSTSE's representative to the board of directors of the ISSSTE as well as the SNTSA's finance secretary between 1998 and 2001 and its secretary general from 2001 to 2004.

In 2003, the PRI sent García Ayala to the federal Chamber of Deputies for the first time in the LIX Legislature. He was a secretary on the Social Security Commission and sat on those dealing with the Federal District, Labor and Social Welfare, and Health. He followed his three years at the federal legislature with a term in the Legislative Assembly of the Federal District (ALDF), from 2006 to 2009, and when that term ended, it was back to San Lázaro for another three-year term as a proportional representation federal deputy, representing the Federal District in the fourth region. He was a secretary on the Health Commission and was also a member of the Housing, Federal District, and Special to Analyze Outsourcing Schemes for Public Services Commissions. When the LXI Legislature ended in 2012, García Ayala returned to the ALDF; in his second stint as a local deputy, he presided over the Special Commission on the Social Protection Health System and served on those dealing with Education and Public Security. However, one local newspaper described him as a "ghost deputy", noting that he had no office expenses, nobody knew him in the legislature, and he did not deliver a floor address in the first year of his second term; additionally, he only attended one meeting of the special commission he presided and led the legislature in missing 34 percent of its general sessions. In 2015, the president of the legislature reprimanded García Ayala and Daniel Ordóñez Hernández, of the PRD, for their poor attendance. In the meantime, he became the president of the SNTSA; in November 2013, he ran unopposed for reelection to a term lasting until 2018.

In 2015, the PRI yet again sent García Ayala to the Chamber of Deputies from a party list, but this time from the first region and Baja California instead of Mexico City in the fourth region; upon the announcement of his placement on the first region list, one article in a Baja California newspaper noted that, despite being born in Mexicali, García Ayala "doesn't even belong to this state". He serves on the Health, Northern Border Matters, and Human Rights Commissions.
