= Alfredo Fernández Moreno =

Mexican politician

- Born: 30 January 1947 (age 79); San Luis Potosí, Mexico
- Occupation: Politician
- Political party: PAN

Alfredo Fernández Moreno (born 30 January 1947) is a Mexican politician affiliated with the National Action Party. As of 2014 he served as Deputy of the LIX Legislature of the Mexican Congress as a plurinominal representative.
