= Rolando García Alonso =

Mexican diplomat and politician

- Born: Mexico City, Mexico
- Occupations: Diplomat and politician
- Political party: PAN

Rolando García Alonso is a Mexican diplomat and politician affiliated with the National Action Party. As of 2014 he served as Deputy of the LIX Legislature of the Mexican Congress as a plurinominal representative as replacement of Margarita Zavala. He also served as Consul General of Mexico to Shanghai from 2011 to 2014.
