= Esthela Ponce Beltrán =

Mexican politician

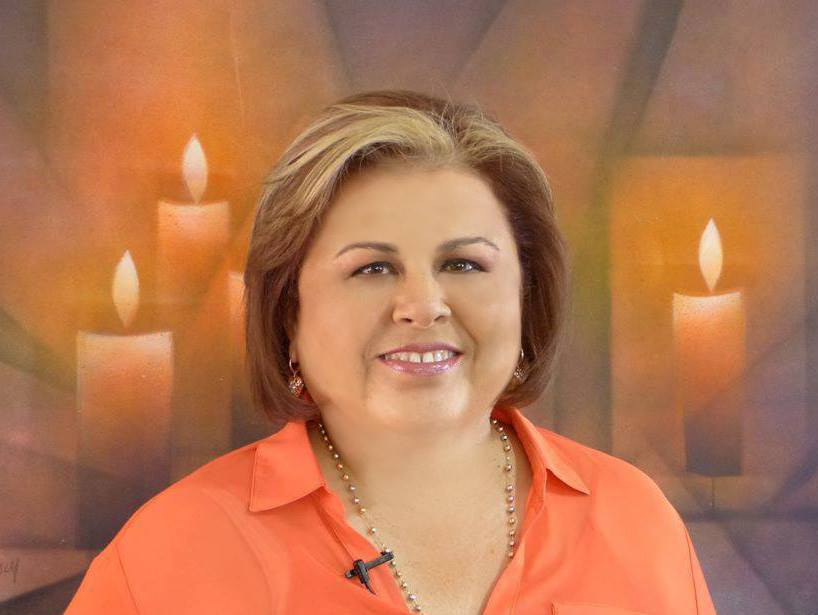

Personal details
- Born: 27 August 1964 (age 61) La Paz, Baja California Sur, Mexico
- Party: Institutional Revolutionary Party
- Occupation: Politician

Esthela de Jesús Ponce Beltrán (born 27 August 1964) is a Mexican politician affiliated with the Institutional Revolutionary Party. She has served as a deputy of the LIX, LXI and currently LXIII Legislatures of the Mexican Congress, each time by way of proportional representation.

== Life ==
While she studied for her degree in business administration at the Instituto Tecnológico de La Paz, Ponce got involved in PRI politics; she served as the secretary general of the Revolutionary Youth Movement in La Paz between 1982 and 1986, and between 1989 and 1993, she was the secretary general of the Council for the Integration of Women. In 1990, she began a three-year term on the city council of La Paz. In business, she was involved with several companies in the 1980s, particularly Industrial Mercantil Agropecuaria, of which she was a deputy manager and shareholder between 1984 and 1986, and Mueblería Carja, a furniture store, where she was a general manager between 1987 and 1990.

In the mid-1990s through the 2000s, Ponce continued her prolific involvement in PRI politics, primarily as an adjunct secretary to such institutions as the state PRI and BCS chapter of the Confederación Nacional de Organizaciones Populares. Between 1997 and 1999, she directed the Patronato del Estudiante Sudcaliforniano, a state educational institutions. In 1999, she became the vice president of the National Organization of PRI Women (ONMPRI), and three years later, she was tapped to preside it.

The PRI sent Ponce to the Chamber of Deputies for the first time in the LIX Legislature, from 2003 to 2006. She led the PRI delegation from Baja California Sur and served on committees including Equity and Gender; Radio, Television and Film; and Special on Femicides. After her term ended, she became the national secretary of social management for the PRI, and in 2008, Ponce was tapped to become the president of the PRI in Baja California Sur.

In 2009, the PRI sent Ponce again to San Lázaro as a proportional representation deputy. In the LXI Legislature, she sat on five commissions, including Navy, Tourism, Equity and Gender, Information, Management and Complaints, and Special to Stimulate the Development of the Wine Industry. She also advised the Senate during the LXI Legislature.

After twelve years of PRD mayors, voters in the state capital of La Paz elected Ponce as their municipal president in 2011 for a four-year term, part of an election which saw the PRI and its coalition partner, the PVEM, take back Loreto and La Paz from the PRD. During her term, Ponce served as the president of the Network of Municipalities for Health in the state, as well as in the National Federation of Municipalities of Mexico (FENAMM).

In 2015, the PRI placed Ponce Beltrán third on their proportional representation list from the first region, virtually guaranteeing her return to the Chamber of Deputies. She serves on three commissions: Competitiveness, Municipal Development, and Rules and Parliamentary Practices.

La Paz authorities presented the PGR in July 2016 with evidence claiming to show that under her government, 70 million pesos of public funds were improperly used.
