= María García Velasco =

Mexican politician

- Born: 20 January 1964 (age 62); Mexico
- Occupation: Politician
- Political party: PAN

María Guadalupe García Velasco (born 20 January 1964) is a Mexican politician affiliated with the National Action Party. As of 2014 she served as Deputy of the LIX Legislature of the Mexican Congress as a plurinominal representative.
