= Omar Ortega Álvarez =

Mexican politician

- Born: 14 September 1970 (age 55); Ciudad Guzmán, Jalisco, Mexico
- Occupation: Politician
- Political party: PRD

Omar Ortega Álvarez (born 14 September 1970) is a Mexican politician affiliated with the Party of the Democratic Revolution. As of 2014 he served as Deputy of the LIX Legislature of the Mexican Congress as a plurinominal representative.
