= Rigoberto González González =

Mexican politician

- Education: UANL; University of New Mexico
- Occupation: Politician
- Political party: PAN

Rigoberto González González is a Mexican politician affiliated with the National Action Party. As of 2006 he served as Senator of the LIX Legislature of the Mexican Congress representing Nuevo León as replacement of Adalberto Arturo Madero Quiroga.
