= Edelmira Gutiérrez =

Mexican politician

- Born: 5 February 1963 (age 63)
- Occupation: Politician
- Political party: PAN

Edelmira Gutiérrez Ríos (born 5 February 1963) is a Mexican politician affiliated with the National Action Party. As of 2014 she served as Deputy of the LIX Legislature of the Mexican Congress as a plurinominal representative.
