= Arturo Nahle =

Mexican politician

- Born: 29 August 1961 (age 64); Río Grande, Zacatecas, Mexico
- Occupation: Politician
- Political party: PRI

Arturo Nahle García (born 29 August 1961) is a Mexican politician affiliated with the Institutional Revolutionary Party. As of 2014 he served as Deputy of the LIX Legislature of the Mexican Congress representing Zacatecas.
