= José Alberto Castañeda =

Mexican politician

- Born: 3 September 1949 (age 76); Monterrey, Nuevo León, Mexico
- Education: Universidad Iberoamericana
- Occupation: Politician
- Political party: PAN

José Alberto Castañeda Pérez (born 3 September 1949) is a Mexican politician affiliated with the National Action Party. As of 2014 he served as Senator of the LVIII and LIX Legislatures of the Mexican Congress representing Yucatán and as Deputy of the LVII Legislature.
