= Adrián Chávez Ruiz =

Mexican politician

- Born: 27 August 1976 (age 49); Mexico City, Mexico
- Education: UABCS
- Occupation: Politician
- Political party: PRD

Adrián Chávez Ruiz (born 27 August 1976) is a Mexican politician affiliated with the Party of the Democratic Revolution. As of 2014 he served as Deputy of the LIX Legislature of the Mexican Congress as a plurinominal representative.
