= Rebeca Godínez y Bravo =

Mexican politician

- Born: 16 April 1948 (age 78); Puebla, Puebla, Mexico
- Occupation: Politician
- Political party: PRI

Rebeca Godínez y Bravo (born 16 April 1948) is a Mexican politician affiliated with the Institutional Revolutionary Party. As of 2014 she served as Deputy of the LIX Legislature of the Mexican Congress as a plurinominal representative.
