= Francisco Mora Ciprés =

Mexican politician

- Born: 16 July 1961 (age 64)
- Occupation: Politician
- Political party: PRD

Francisco Mora Ciprés (born 16 July 1961) is a Mexican politician affiliated with the Party of the Democratic Revolution. He served as Deputy of the LIX Legislature of the Mexican Congress as a plurinominal representative, and previously served as municipal president of Jiquilpan from 1996 to 1998.
