= José Luis Tapia =

Mexican politician

- Born: 18 June 1963 (age 62); Oaxaca, Mexico
- Occupation: Politician
- Political party: PRI

Paulo José Luis Tapia Palacios (born 18 June 1963) is a Mexican politician affiliated with the Institutional Revolutionary Party (PRI). In the 2003 mid-terms he was elected to the Chamber of Deputies to represent the third district of Oaxaca during the 59th Congress.
