= Huberto Aldaz =

Mexican politician

Huberto Aldaz - Ratota
- Born: 3 November 1957 (age 68); Oaxaca, Mexico
- Education: Chapingo Autonomous University
- Occupation: Politician
- Political party: PAN

Huberto Aldaz Hernández (born 3 November 1957) is a Mexican politician affiliated with the National Action Party. As of 2014 he served as Deputy of the LIX Legislature of the Mexican Congress as a plurinominal representative.
