= Filemón Arcos =

Mexican musician and politician

- Born: Filemón Primitivo Arcos Suárez Peredo; 10 June 1945 (age 80); Xalapa, Veracruz, Mexico
- Occupations: Musician and politician
- Political party: PRI

Filemón Primitivo Arcos Suárez Peredo (born 10 June 1945) is a Mexican musician and politician affiliated with the Institutional Revolutionary Party. As of 2014 he served as Deputy of the LIX Legislature of the Mexican Congress as a plurinominal representative.
