= Gustavo Cárdenas Gutiérrez =

Mexican businessman and politician

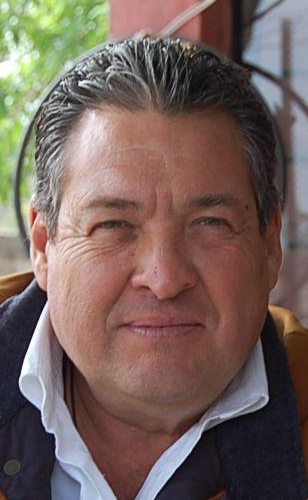

Personal details
- Born: 25 January 1958 (age 68) Matamoros, Tamaulipas, Mexico
- Party: PAN (1993–2013); MC (2013–present)
- Occupation: Businessman and politician

Gustavo Adolfo Cárdenas Gutiérrez (born 25 January 1958) is a Mexican businessman and politician affiliated with Movimiento Ciudadano (formerly from the National Action Party). He represented Tamaulipas and the second electoral region in the Chamber of Deputies for the LXIII Legislature of the Mexican Congress and has previously been a federal deputy and senator from the same state. He also served as a deputy in the Congress of Tamaulipas during the 66th legislature (2021-2024).

== Life ==
Cárdenas got his first job in operations at XEEW radio in Matamoros and worked at the El Bernal shredding plant in González as he pursued a degree in business administration from the Universidad Autónoma de Tamaulipas. He also became the director general of a hotel in Ciudad Victoria and of Cerámica Santa Mónica, S.A. de C.V. His business career continued to be diverse as the 1980s continued: he sat on the Mexican Association of Hotels and Motels, ran a gas station, and served on the Tamaulipas Chamber of Commerce and state chapter of Canacintra (Chamber of Industry).

In the early 1990s, Cárdenas ran for and won the municipal presidency of Ciudad Victoria, serving from 1993 to 1995. This first public office propelled his political career; he was a local deputy to the LVI Legislature of the Congress of Tamaulipas between 1996 and 1998 and was the PAN's gubernatorial candidate in 1998 and 2004. Between 1999 and 2000, he was the president of the PAN in Tamaulipas, leaving that position to make a successful bid for the Senate. In the LVIII and LIX Legislatures, he was the President of the Tourism Commission and sat on those dealing with Social Development and Economic Development. He cut his Senate term short in order to pursue a second bid for governor, which failed.

In 2006, Cárdenas returned to the federal legislature, this time as a deputy in the LIX Legislature. He sat on the commissions for Tourism; Population, Borders and Migratory Matters; Special for the Bicentennial of Independence and Centennial of the Revolution; and Special for Attention to Forest Peoples. From 2007 to 2010, he worked in ASERCA (Aid and Service to Agricultural Marketing), a division of SAGARPA.

2013 marked the end of Cárdenas's tenure in the PAN. He was considered by the party as its potential candidate for municipal president of Ciudad Victoria; when the PAN selected another candidate, he left the party and accepted Movimiento Ciudadano's invitation to run under its banner instead. Cárdenas finished second but lost by 9,000 votes to Alejandro Etienne, of a PRI-PVEM coalition. In 2014, Cárdenas became the coordinator of MC's State Operating Commission in Tamaulipas.

In 2015, Movimiento Ciudadano placed Cárdenas on its party list from the second region for the LXIII Legislature, returning Cárdenas to San Lázaro. He presided over the Navy Commission and sat on the Infrastructure Commission.

On February 23, 2016, Cárdenas took leave from the Chamber of Deputies in order to pursue his third bid for Governor of Tamaulipas, being temporarily replaced in the legislature by his alternate, Daniel Adrián Sosa Carpio; the MC bid came in a distant third to the PRI and PAN candidacies, pulling in 5.8 percent of the vote.
