= Leonardo Álvarez Romo =

Mexican politician

- Born: 7 October 1972 (age 53); Mexico City, Mexico
- Occupation: Politician
- Political party: PVEM

Leonardo Alvarez Romo (born 7 October 1972) is a Mexican politician associated with the Ecologist Green Party of Mexico.

== Biography ==
Leonardo Alvarez Romo holds an undergraduate degree in Political Science and Public Administration from the Universidad Iberoamericana. Additionally, he has earned several certificates in public speaking, English, and business dynamics from Fork Union Military Academy and ITAM in Mexico. His political career began in 1994 when he participated in the campaign of presidential candidate Luis Donaldo Colosio Murrieta, alongside former Mexican Senator and Presidential Candidate Armando Ríos Piter. Following the assassination of Colosio, Alvarez Romo founded the environmental NGO CAMBIOS (Changes) and continued his studies in Political Sciences and Public Administration. Subsequently, he served as the personal assistant to politician Manuel Camacho Solis in the Center Democratic Party from 1997 to 2000.

In November 2000, Alvarez Romo joined the Ecologist Green Party of Mexico. From 2000 to 2003, he served as a political adviser to green legislators in the Senate and later advised the President of the Green Party of Mexico. He was then nominated by his party as Congressman of the LIX Legislature of the Mexican Congress from 2003 to 2006. During his tenure, he chaired the Special Commission for the Reform of the Nation and was a member of various other commissions. Notable achievements include reforms to the Environmental Law, including provisions for the participation of the Mexican Armed Forces in environmental protection efforts.

From 2006 to 2009, Alvarez Romo served as a member of the Legislative Assembly of Mexico City, 4th legislature, where he held leadership roles and spearheaded legislative efforts related to environmental protection. Additionally, he worked in the Federal Government at the Ministry of Environment and Natural Resources of Mexico, focusing on Indigenous, Legislative, and NGO affairs within the National Parks CONANP. Since 2004, he has served as the Secretary of International Affairs of the Ecologist Green Party of Mexico. Furthermore, he has been elected three times as President of the Federation of the Green Parties in the Americas (FPVA), in the terms 2009–2011 (Santiago, Chile), 2015–2017 (Punta Cana, Dominican Republic), and 2021–2023 (Buenos Aires, Argentina).
