= Óscar Rodríguez Cabrera =

Mexican politician

- Born: 4 December 1964 (age 61); Campeche, Campeche, Mexico
- Education: UNAM
- Occupation: Politician
- Political party: PRI

Óscar Rodríguez Cabrera (born 4 December 1964) is a Mexican politician affiliated with the Institutional Revolutionary Party. He served as federal deputy of the LIX Legislature of the Mexican Congress as a plurinominal representative, and previously served as a local deputy in the Congress of Campeche.
