= Carlos Blackaller =

Mexican politician

- Born: 3 March 1963 (age 63); Guadalajara, Jalisco, Mexico
- Education: Universidad Panamericana
- Occupation: Politician
- Political party: PRI

Carlos Blackaller Ayala (born 3 March 1963) is a Mexican politician affiliated with the Institutional Revolutionary Party. As of 2014 he served as Deputy of the LIX Legislature of the Mexican Congress as a plurinominal representative.
