= Belizario Herrera =

Mexican politician

- Born: 12 July 1962 (age 63); Motozintla, Chiapas, Mexico
- Occupation: Politician
- Political party: PRI

Belizario Iram Herrera Solís (born 12 July 1962) is a Mexican politician affiliated with the Institutional Revolutionary Party. As of 2014 he served as Deputy of the LIX Legislature of the Mexican Congress representing Chiapas.
