= Gerardo Buganza =

Mexican politician

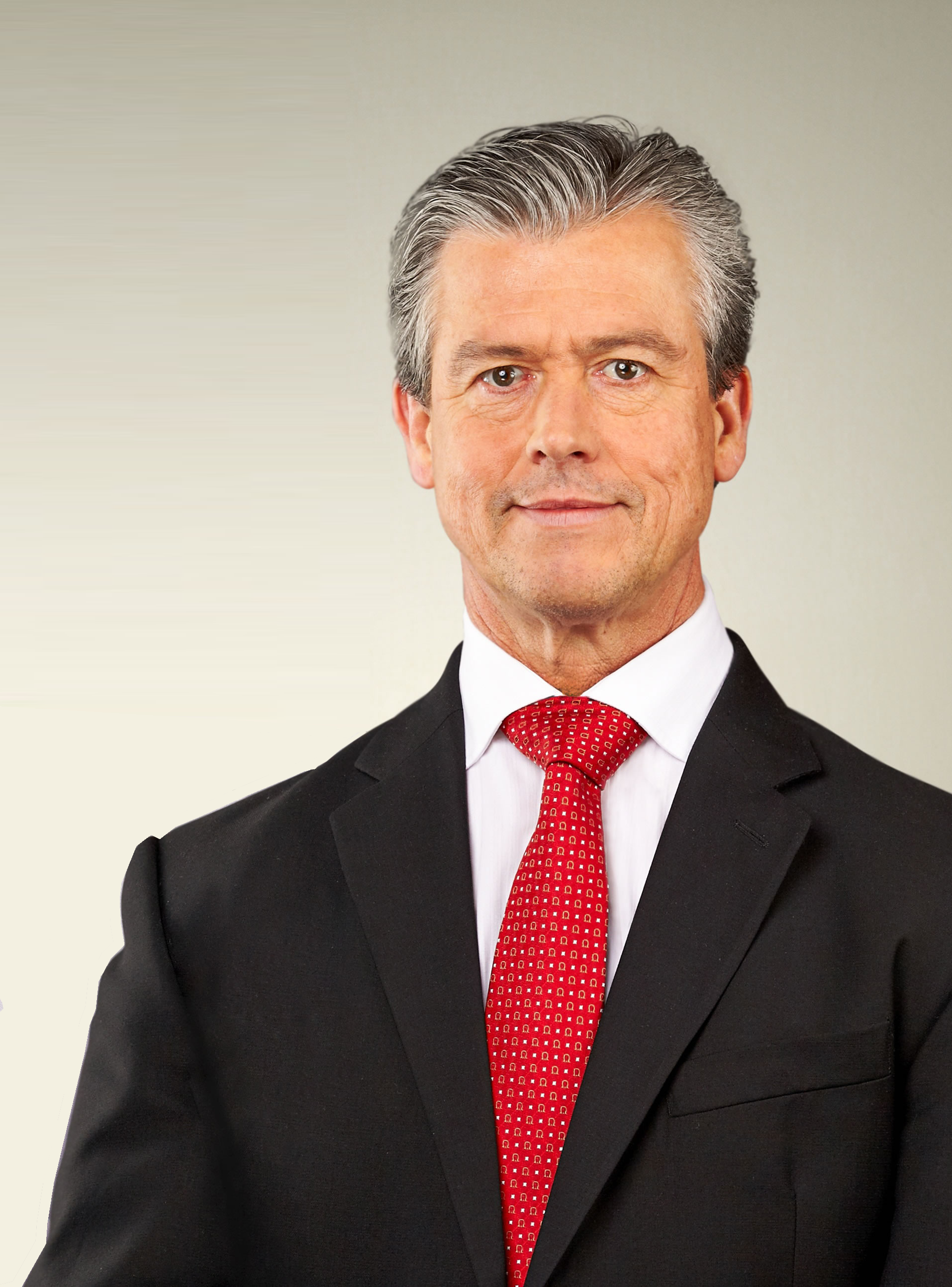
Gerardo Buganza

Gerardo Buganza Salmerón (born 24 May 1956) is a Mexican politician affiliated with the National Action Party (PAN) who currently serves in the lower house of the Mexican Congress.

Buganza has served as federal deputy (1997–2000) and as senator (2000–2006). In 2004 he unsuccessfully ran for Governor of Veracruz representing the PAN; he lost against Fidel Herrera Beltrán.

In 2006 he was elected via the proportional representation to serve as federal deputy (2006–2009) representing Veracruz. He is President of the Committee on Foreign Affairs.
