= Raúl Pompa Victoria =

Mexican politician

- Born: 6 November 1944 (age 81); Tijuana, Baja California, Mexico
- Occupation: Politician
- Political party: PRI

Raúl Pompa Victoria (born 6 November 1944) is a Mexican politician affiliated with the Institutional Revolutionary Party. As of 2014 he served as Deputy of the LIX Legislature of the Mexican Congress as a plurinominal representative.
