= Guillermo Herbert Pérez =

Mexican politician (born 1934)

- Born: 10 February 1934 (age 92); Querétaro, Querétaro, Mexico
- Occupation: Politician
- Political party: PAN

Guillermo Herbert Pérez (born 10 February 1934) is a Mexican politician affiliated with the National Action Party. As of 2014 he served as Senator of the LVIII and LIX Legislatures of the Mexican Congress representing Querétaro.
