= Edmundo Valencia Monterrubio =

Mexican politician (born 1946)

- Born: 18 November 1946 (age 79); Hidalgo, Mexico
- Occupation: Politician
- Political party: PAN

Edmundo Gregorio Valencia Monterrubio (born 18 November 1946) is a Mexican politician affiliated with the National Action Party. He served as Deputy of the LIX Legislature of the Mexican Congress as a plurinominal representative. He also served as municipal president of Atotonilco El Grande.
