= Diana Bernal =

Mexican jurist and politician

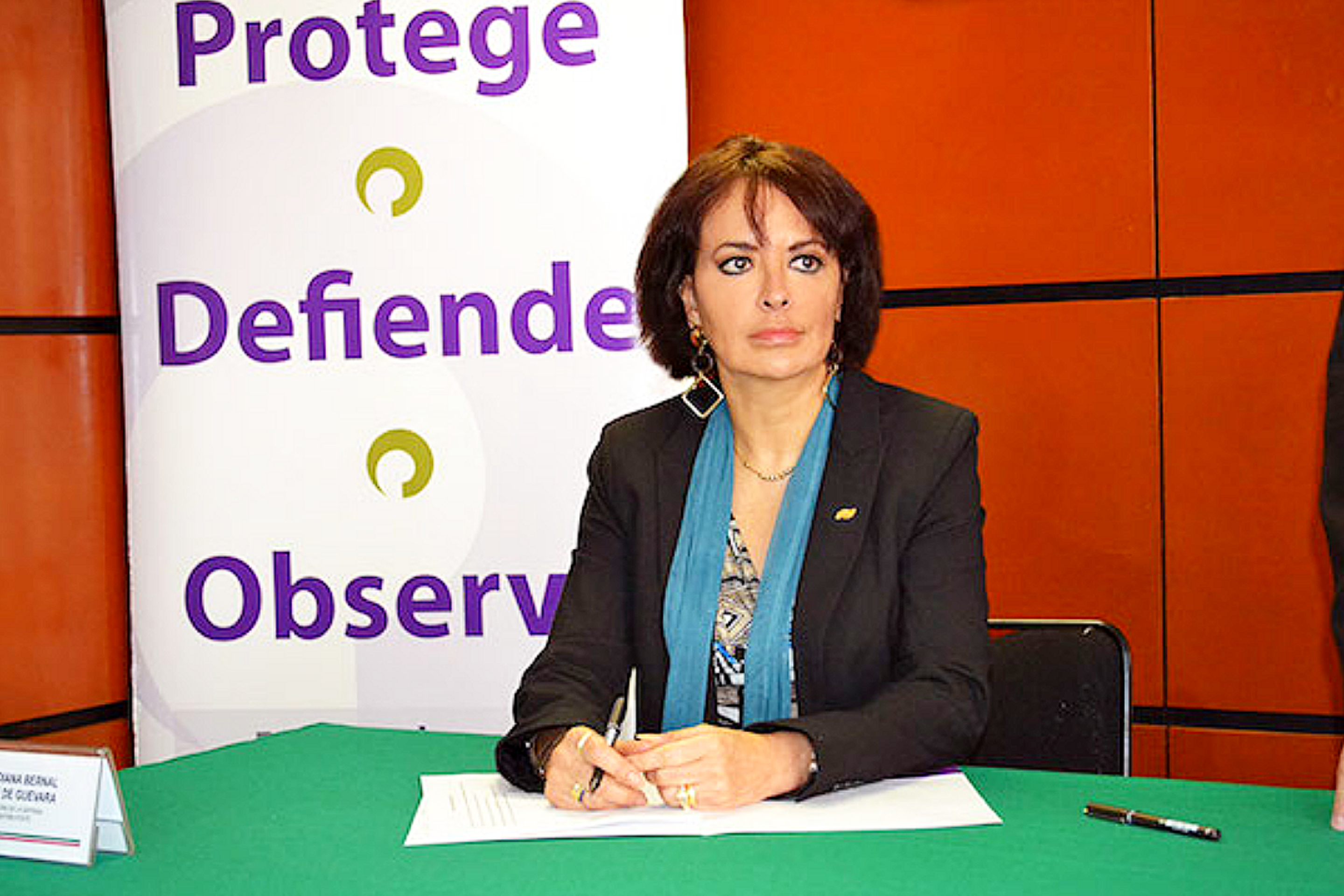

Magistrate of Federal Court
- Incumbent
- Assumed office March 2006

Diana Rosalía Bernal Ladrón de Guevara is a Mexican jurist and politician who has served in the lower house of the Mexican Congress.

Bernal studied law at the Ibero-American University (Universidad Iberoamericana). In the early 1980s she joined the Tribunal Fiscal de la Federación; She has served in various position within the Mexican judicial branch of government including judge and magistrate. In 1998 she was designated by Cuauhtémoc Cárdenas borough mayor of Iztacalco not Tláhuac. In 2003 she won a seat in the Chamber of Deputies to serve during the LIX Legislature representing the Party of the Democratic Revolution (PRD); she left that position in March 2006 after being appointed Magistrate of Federal Court (Tribunal Federal de Justicia Fiscal y Administrativa)

Nowadays, she coordinates a specialized group of experts (top level public servants, Congressmen, among others) on administrative and fiscal areas which main commitment is to enrich the Mexican tax system. This group, whose name is Análisis Tributario Legislativo ATRIL (Tax - Legislative Analysis), is a kind of think tank especially focused on Taxation and Tax Administration reforms, as well as specific issues like taxpayers’ rights.
