= Sergio Álvarez Mata =

Mexican politician

- Born: 19 July 1962 (age 63); Cuernavaca, Morelos, Mexico
- Education: Universidad Autónoma del Estado de Morelos
- Occupations: Senator and Deputy
- Political party: PAN

Sergio Álvarez Mata (born 19 July 1962) is a Mexican politician affiliated with the PAN. As of 2013 he served as Senator of the LX and LXI Legislatures of the Mexican Congress representing Morelos. He also served as Deputy during the LIX Legislature.

== See also ==
- List of people from Morelos
