= Dolores Gutiérrez Zurita =

Mexican politician

- Born: 7 October 1963 (age 62); Villahermosa, Tabasco, Mexico
- Occupation: Politician
- Political party: PRD

Dolores del Carmen Gutiérrez Zurita (born 7 October 1963) is a Mexican politician affiliated with the PRD. As of 2014 she served as Senator of the LXI Legislature of the Mexican Congress representing Tabasco as replacement of Arturo Núñez Jiménez.
