= Jorge Fernando Franco =

Mexican politician

- Born: 12 May 1971 (age 55); Oaxaca, Oaxaca, Mexico
- Occupation: Politician
- Political party: PRI

Jorge Fernando Franco Vargas (born 12 May 1971) is a Mexican politician affiliated with the Institutional Revolutionary Party. As of 2014 he served as Deputy of the LIX Legislature of the Mexican Congress as a plurinominal representative.
