= Patricia Garduño =

Mexican politician

- Born: 25 November 1960 (age 65); Mexico City, Mexico
- Occupation: Politician
- Political party: PAN

Patricia Garduño Morales (born 25 November 1960) is a Mexican politician affiliated with the National Action Party. As of 2014 she served as Deputy of the LVI and LIX Legislatures of the Mexican Congress as a plurinominal representative.
