= Jesús Lomelí =

Mexican politician (born 1953)

- Born: 15 January 1953 (age 73); El Salto, Jalisco, Mexico
- Occupation: Politician
- Political party: PRI

Jesús Lomelí Rosas (born 15 January 1953) is a Mexican politician affiliated with the Institutional Revolutionary Party. As of 2014 he served as Deputy of the LIX Legislature of the Mexican Congress as a plurinominal representative.
