= Daniel López Nelio =

Mexican politician

- Born: 10 April 1949; Juchitán de Zaragoza, Oaxaca, Mexico
- Died: 8 June 2004 (aged 55)
- Occupation: Politician
- Political party: PRD

Daniel López Nelio Santiago (10 April 1949 – 8 June 2004) was a Mexican politician affiliated with the Party of the Democratic Revolution. He served as Senator of the LVIII and briefly during the LIX Legislature of the Mexican Congress representing Oaxaca and as federal deputy of the LIV Legislature. He also served as a local deputy in the LVII Legislature of the Congress of Oaxaca.
