= Alberto Miguel Martínez Mireles =

Mexican politician

- Born: 29 September 1950 (age 75); San Luis Potosí, San Luis Potosí, Mexico
- Education: UASLP
- Occupation: Politician
- Political party: PAN

Alberto Miguel Martínez Mireles (born 29 September 1950) is a Mexican politician affiliated with the National Action Party. As of 2014 he served as Senator of the LVIII and LIX Legislatures of the Mexican Congress representing San Luis Potosí and as Deputy of the LV Legislature.
