= Carlos Manuel Villalobos Organista =

Mexican politician

- Born: 1 September 1951 (age 74); Teocaltiche, Jalisco, Mexico
- Occupation: Politician
- Political party: PAN

Carlos Manuel Villalobos Organista (born 1 September 1951) is a Mexican politician affiliated with the National Action Party. As of 2014 he served as Senator of the LIX Legislature of the Mexican Congress representing Sonora as replacement of Ramón Corral Ávila.
