= Filemón Navarro =

Mexican politician

- Born: 4 May 1977 (age 49); Guerrero, Mexico
- Occupation: Politician
- Political party: PRD

Filemón Navarro Aguilar (born 4 May 1977) is a Mexican politician from the Party of the Democratic Revolution. From 2009 to 2012 he served as Deputy of the LXI Legislature of the Mexican Congress representing Guerrero.
