= José Guzmán Santos =

Mexican politician (born 1947)

- Born: 19 March 1947 (age 79); Asunción Ixtatepec, Oaxaca, Mexico
- Education: IPN
- Occupation: Politician
- Political party: PRI

José Guzmán Santos (born 19 March 1947) is a Mexican politician affiliated with the Institutional Revolutionary Party (PRI). In the 2003 mid-terms he was elected to the Chamber of Deputies to represent the seventh district of Oaxaca during the 59th Congress.
