= Óscar Rodríguez (Paraguayan politician) =

Paraguayan politician (born 1981)

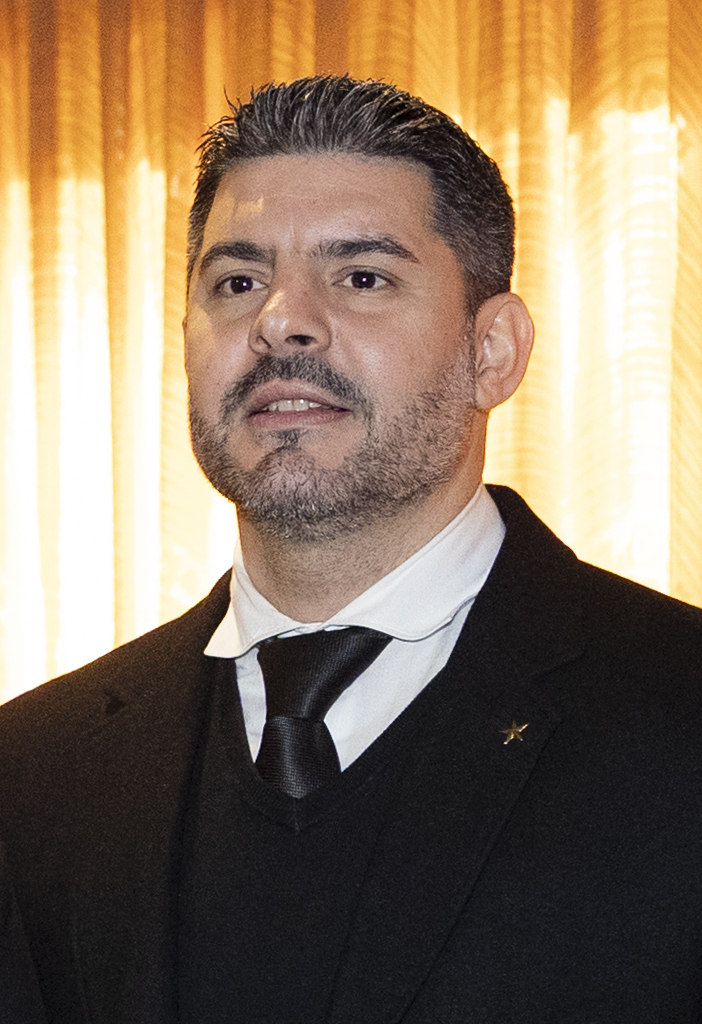

Mayor of Asunción
- In office 20 December 2019 – 22 August 2025
- Preceded by: Mario Ferreiro
- Succeeded by: Luis Bello

Personal details
- Born: May 20, 1981 (age 45) Asunción, Paraguay
- Party: Colorado Party
- Spouse: Lizarella Valiente (m. 2022)
- Children: 3
- Occupation: Politician and businessman
- Nickname: Nenecho

Óscar Andrés Rodríguez Quiñonez (born May 20, 1981) is a Paraguayan politician and former TV personality who served as mayor of Asunción from 2019 to 2025.

He served his first term as municipal mayor, between December 2019 and July 2021, replacing Mario Ferreiro, due to the order of succession established in the municipal organic law due to the resignation of the last mayor. In the 2021 national elections he was elected for a second term and resigned in August 2025, after an administrative intervention in the Municipality of Asunción by the Paraguayan Government.

== Early life ==
Óscar Andrés Rodríguez Quiñónez was born on May 20, 1981 in Asunción, son of Óscar Rodríguez Kennedy and Olga Quiñónez Daiub. His father is a judge and Colorado Party politician, known for having supported Alfredo Stroessner, Lino Oviedo, Hugo Chávez, Evo Morales, and Horacio Cartes throughout his career.

At eighteen, while still in school, Rodríguez had a daughter, who has been accused of benefiting from nepotism after her irregular hiring into public service.

In 2011, Rodríguez began a relationship with actress, dancer and fellow Colorado Party politician Lizarella Valiente. In 2015 they had their first child, Óscar de Jesús, who was born prematurely and died just hours later. In 2019 they had their second son, Óscar Emmanuel. The couple married in 2022.

He holds a degree in Business Administration and another degree in Commercial Engineering, both from "Universidad Americana" in Asunción, Paraguay.

== Political career ==
Óscar Rodríguez served for many years in public office and held important positions, such as Director of the Contracting Unit of the Supreme Court of Justice.

=== Municipal Board of Asuncion ===
He was elected Municipal Councilor of Asunción in 2015. For two years he was president of the Municipal Board.

=== Mayor of Asunción ===
In December 2019, he took over as Mayor of Asunción, due to the resignation of the last mayor. Initially it had to complete the corresponding period between 2019 and 2020 but due to the COVID-19 Pandemic, the Executive Power of Paraguay extended the mandate of the mayors and municipal councilors of all the districts of the republic for up to one year, who continued in the exercise. from office until the assumption of the new elected authorities in 2021.

In the Municipal Elections of 2021 with 122,353 votes, Óscar “Nenecho” Rodríguez was elected mayor of Asunción for the period 2021–2025.

In June 2025, due to reports of irregularities in Rodríguez's administration, the Paraguayan national government intervened the municipal government of Asunción, Rodríguez was suspended from his post and the functions of the mayor were transferred to the comptroller, who had the task of creating a report on the city's government and presenting it to the Chamber of Deputies, which has the power to remove Rodríguez as mayor of Asunción or allow him to retain his post. On 22 August 2025, the day that the comptroller finished his report, Rodríguez announced that he was resigning from his position as mayor to avoid being removed from his post by the Chamber of Deputies and thus avoiding new elections. The municipal board of Asunción named councillor Luis Bello as his replacement.

The administration of Óscar "Nenecho" Rodríguez was accused of orchestrating a diversion of the money from a "G8 bond", which reached 360 billion Guaranies and was issued under his management in 2022. Instead of using this fund to pay for drainage works, which was the reason for issuing the bond, "Nenecho" made salary payments and several unnecessary expenditures (such as flights to USA, Argentina and Spain) according to the report of the intervention carried out by the economist Carlos Pereira in 2025 Under "Nenecho's" administration, in 2021, the "G7 bond" was also issued for 200 billion guaraníes. The use of these funds was opaque, as several projects that were supposed to be carried out with these funds remained unfinished by the end of his term. Among them was the continuation of a revitalization project for the Asunción Bus Terminal, for which 18 billion guaraníes from the bond issuance had been allocated. In addition, another G. 6 billion from the G7 bond was to be used to pay for revitalization works at the Ita Pyta Punta neighborhood viewpoint in the capital however, the money from the G7 bond is not mentioned or accounted for within the municipal bond bank accounts, according to the accounting balances.

== Television ==
Rodríguez participated as a contestant in television programmes like Calle 7 and Baila Conmigo Paraguay. During his tenure as councilman, he successfully petitioned that Calle 7 was declared of municipal interest by the Asunción City Council. According to him, this program helps keep young people away from drugs.
