= Angélica de la Peña Gómez =

Mexican politician (born 1954)

- Born: 30 May 1954 (age 71); Guadalajara, Jalisco, Mexico
- Occupation: Senator
- Political party: PRD
- Spouse: Jesús Ortega Martínez

Angélica de la Peña Gómez (born 30 May 1954) is a Mexican politician affiliated with the PRD. She currently serves as Senator of the LXII Legislature of the Mexican Congress. She also served as Deputy of the Congress between 1997 and 2000 and from 2003 until 2006 always for plurinominal via.
