= Filemón Treviño =

File Treviño is a Mexican artist author from Monterrey, Nuevo León, noted for creating the world's largest pencil drawing.
