= Gabriela Ruiz del Rincón =

Mexican politician

- Born: 7 May 1956 (age 70); Sinaloa, Mexico
- Occupations: Deputy and Senator
- Political party: PAN

Gabriela Ruiz del Rincón (born 7 May 1956) is a Mexican politician affiliated with the PAN. As of 2013 she served as Senator of the LX and LXI Legislatures of the Mexican Congress representing Sinaloa.
