= Ernesto Herrera Tovar =

Mexican politician

- Born: 19 May 1972 (age 54); Mexico City, Mexico
- Occupation: Politician
- Political party: PAN

Ernesto Herrera Tovar (born 19 May 1972) is a Mexican politician affiliated with the National Action Party. As of 2014 he served as Deputy of the LIX Legislature of the Mexican Congress as a plurinominal representative.
