= Arturo Osornio =

Mexican politician

- Born: 20 February 1953 (age 73); Aculco, State of Mexico, Mexico
- Occupation: Politician
- Political party: PRI

Arturo Osornio Sánchez (born 20 February 1953) is a Mexican politician affiliated with the Institutional Revolutionary Party. As of 2014 he served as Deputy of the LIV and LIX Legislatures of the Mexican Congress representing the State of Mexico.
