= Jorge Nordhausen =

Mexican politician

- Born: 20 November 1950 (age 75); Reynosa, Tamaulipas, Mexico
- Occupations: Senator and Deputy
- Political party: PAN

Jorge Rubén Nordhausen González (born 20 November 1950 in Reynosa, Mexico) is a Mexican politician affiliated with the PAN. He served as Senator of the LVIII and LIX Legislatures of the Mexican Congress representing Campeche. He also served as Deputy of the LX Legislature.
