= Elpidio Tovar =

Mexican politician (born 1949)

- Born: 6 April 1949 (age 77); Los Ramones, Nuevo León, Mexico
- Occupation: Politician
- Political party: PRD

Elpidio Tovar de la Cruz (born 6 April 1949) is a Mexican politician affiliated with the Party of the Democratic Revolution. As of 2014 he served as Deputy of the LII and LIX Legislatures of the Mexican Congress as a plurinominal representative.
