= Héctor Miguel Bautista López =

Mexican politician

Héctor Miguel Bautista López (born 5 September 1960) is a Mexican left-wing politician affiliated with the Party of the Democratic Revolution (PRD). He has served in both chambers of Congress.

== Personal life and education ==
Bautista López has a bachelor's degree in agriculture from the National Autonomous University of Mexico (UNAM).

== Political career ==
Bautista has been an active left-wing politician in the State of México. He occupied different positions within the Mexican Workers' Party including head of the party in the State of México. He was a founder of the Mexican Socialist Party (PMS) and a founder of the Party of the Democratic Revolution.

In 2000, he was elected municipal president (mayor) of Nezahualcóyotl. In the 2003 mid-terms, voters in the State of Mexico's 31st district sent him to the Chamber of Deputies to serve during the 59th session of Congress. In the 2006 general election he was elected to the Senate for the State of Mexico.
