= María de los Ángeles Fromow =

Mexican politician

María de los Angeles Fromow Rangel (Mexico City, 10 October 1966–) is a Mexican lawyer who served as Special Attorney for the Attention of Electoral Crimes of the Attorney General's Office. She was appointed Special Attorney in February 2001 by President Vicente Fox.

Fromow holds a bachelor's degree in law from the National Autonomous University of Mexico (UNAM), and has pursued graduate studies in different universities including the Universidad Complutense de Madrid.

In January 2007, President Felipe Calderón Hinojosa appointed her as head of the Liaisons Unit of the Health Secretariat.

In January 2013, President Enrique Peña Nieto appointed her as Technical Secretary of the Penal System.
