= Armando Méndez de la Luz =

Mexican politician

- Born: 27 August 1951 (age 74); Veracruz, Veracruz, Mexico
- Occupation: Politician
- Political party: MC

Armando Méndez de la Luz (born 27 August 1951) is a Mexican politician affiliated with the Convergence. As of 2014 he served as Senator of the LVIII and LIX Legislatures of the Mexican Congress representing Veracruz.

Preceded by Guillermo Zúñiga Martínez	Municipal President of Xalapa, Veracruz; 1991–1994	Succeeded by Carlos Rodríguez Velasco
