= Maximino Ávila Camacho =

Mexican politician

Maximino Ávila Camacho (1891 in Teziutlán, Puebla – 1945 in Mexico City) was a Constitutionalist Army officer in the Mexican Revolution and afterwards politician who served as governor of Puebla from 1937 to 1941 and as secretary of public works in the cabinet of his brother, President Manuel Ávila Camacho.

== Biography ==
The Avila Camacho family grew up in modest circumstances, with Maximino being the oldest of three brothers. He attended the National Military College as a young man, and in 1914 joined the Constitutionalist Army. Following the end of the military phase of the Mexican Revolution in 1920, he continued in the military, rising to the rank of brigadier general in 1929 and in 1940 a division general. He saw combat in the Cristero War, the religious conflict that broke out in the late 1920s when President Plutarco Elías Calles began strictly enforcing the anti-clerical laws of the 1917 Mexican Constitution. According to historian Enrique Krauze, Maximino participated in the 1929 mass murder of student supporters of José Vasconcelos, following the 1929 election for president.

He became the caudillo (strong man) of his home state of Puebla, serving as governor starting in 1937. The strong man of the state of San Luis Potosí, Gonzalo N. Santos, said of him "The governor of the state, Major General Maximino Ávila Camacho, was in command in Puebla, I mean in command and not just governing, because he commanded the military, the finance ministry, the telegraphs, the mails, the administration of the railroads, and the diocese [of the Catholic Church in Puebla]." He amassed a significant personal fortune in land, cattle, and horses as well as making alliances with enormously wealthy foreign businessmen, such as the Swedish entrepreneur Axel Wenner-Gren and U.S. businessman William O. Jenkins.

Ruthless, temperamental and arrogant, Maximino was the opposite of his younger brother, the affable Manuel Ávila Camacho, whose good manners, even temper and diplomatic skills were famous. The President had trouble protecting his brother from himself, Maximino got into fights, seduced women and dispensed public funds at will. His arrogance reached its limits when he proclaimed that he would be the next president because, since his brother had been president he had the right to be his successor, eventually leading to a rift between the two.

In 1945 the dominant party, founded by Plutarco Elías Calles, renamed the PRI in 1946, would name its presidential candidate, the assured winner of the 1946 elections. Maximino was determined to become the candidate or, at least, have a great influence on the decision. He swore that if the party nominated politician Miguel Alemán Valdés, the son of a Mexican revolutionary but not one himself, Maximino would kill him. Maximino died of a heart attack on February 17, 1945, before the party's convention. Poor health ran in the family, with his brother Manuel suffering heart attacks while campaigning for the presidency and while in office. However, "there were some who wondered whether something more than seasoning had been added to [Maximino's] food" the day he died. Maximino's death averted a potential political crisis were he to be the presidential candidate, creating a family dynasty. The party nominated Maximino's hated enemy, Miguel Alemán Valdés, who went on to succeed Manuel Ávila Camacho as president.

Maximino's life inspired Ángeles Mastretta's novel, Arráncame la Vida and the film adaptation Tear This Heart Out.
