= Lauro Díaz Castro =

Mexican politician

- Born: 16 December 1941; Guamúchil, Sinaloa, Mexico
- Died: 25 July 2003 (aged 61); Mexico City, Mexico
- Occupation: Politician
- Political party: PRI

Lauro Díaz Castro (16 December 1941 – 25 July 2003) was a Mexican politician affiliated with the Institutional Revolutionary Party. He served as Senator of the LVIII Legislature of the Mexican Congress representing Sinaloa. He also served as municipal president of Culiacán from 1990 to 1992.
