= Rubén Fernández Aceves =

Mexican lawyer and politician

- Born: 5 March 1967 (age 58); Mexico City, Mexico
- Occupation: Lawyer

Rubén Alfonso Fernández Aceves (born 5 March 1967) is a Mexican lawyer and politician affiliated with the National Action Party from 1986 to 2002. Deputy of the LVII Legislature.
