= Margarita (given name) =

- Gender: Female

Origin
- Meaning: Pearl
- Region of origin: Persia, Latin, Eastern European

Other names
- Related names: Margaret (English), Margherita (Italian), Marguerite (French), Margareta (Swedish), Margaretha (Dutch), Margarida (Portuguese), Margarete (German), Rita, Maggie

Margarita is a feminine given name in Latin and Eastern European languages. In Latin it came from the Greek word margaritari (μαργαριτάρι), meaning pearl, which was borrowed from Ancient Persia. (In Sogdian, it was marγārt. In modern Persian, the word has become مروارید, morvārīd, meaning 'pearl'.)

The daisy flower is called margarita in Spanish, Greek and other languages. The name is also used in Albanian, Greek, Bulgarian and Russian.

The traditional short form of this name is Rita.

== List of people with the given name ==
- Infanta Margarita, 2nd Duchess of Hernani (born 1939), the younger sister of King Juan Carlos and aunt of the reigning King Felipe VI of Spain
- Margaret of Austria (1584–1611), Queen consort of Spain and Portugal by her marriage to King Philip III and II
- Margarita "Peggy" Schuyler Van Rensselaer (1758–1801), the third daughter of Continental Army General Philip Schuyler and sister in law of Alexander Hamilton
- Princess Margarita, Countess of Colorno (born 1972), Dutch princess
- Margarita of Diez (1544-1608), German noblewoman
- Princess Margarita of Greece and Denmark (1905–1981), Greek princess consort
- Margarita Teresa of Spain, Holy Roman Empress
- Princess Margarita of Romania (born 1949), Romanian princess and Custodian of the Crown of Romania
- Margarita Cedeño de Fernández (born 1965), Dominican politician and lawyer, current Vice President and former First Lady of the Dominican Republic
- Margarita Ferrá de Bartol (1935–2013), Argentine politician
- Margarita Mariscal de Gante (born 1954), Spanish judge and politician
- Margarita Neri, Mexican rebel
- Margarita Rosa de Francisco (born 1965), Colombian actress and singer
- Margarita Robles de Mendoza (1896-1954), Mexican feminist and suffragette
- Margarita Villalta de Sánchez (born 1950), former First Lady of El Salvador
- Margarita Aguirre (1925–2003), Chilean writer and critic
- Margarita Agullona, Roman Catholic nun
- Margarita Alcantara (born 1970), American writer and publisher
- Margarita Aliger (1915–1992), Soviet poet and journalist
- Margarita Aliychuk (born 1990), Russian rhythmic gymnast
- Margarita Andrey (born 1926), Spanish actress
- Margarita Arboix, Spanish academic
- Margarita Arellanes Cervantes (born 1976), Mexican politician
- Margarita Arenas Guzmán (born 1957), Mexican politician
- Margarita Argúas (1902–1986), Argentine academic and judge
- Margarita Armengol (born 1960), Spanish swimmer
- Lady Margarita Armstrong-Jones (born 2002), daughter of David Armstrong-Jones, 2nd Earl of Snowdon
- Margarita Arotingo, Ecuadorian politician
- Margarita Azurdia (1931–1998), Guatemalan artist
- Margarita Balanas (born 1993), Latvian cellist and conductor
- Margarita Ferrá de Bartol (1935–2013), Argentine politician
- Margarita Behrens, neuroscientist and biochemist
- Margarita Bertheau (1913–1975), Costa Rican painter and cultural
- Margarita Betova (born 1994), Russian tennis player
- Margarita María Birriel Salcedo (born 1953), Spanish-Puerto Rican professor, expert in women's history and women's studies
- Margarita Bogdanova (born 1972), Russian rower
- Margarita Bolaños, Costa Rican politician and anthropologist
- Margarita Brender Rubira (1919–2000), Romanian architect
- Margarita Cabello Blanco (born 1957), Colombian lawyer
- Margarita Cabrera, American artist
- Margarita Cano (artist), Cuban American artist and librarian
- Margarita Carmen Cansino, the birth name of American actress Rita Hayworth
- Margarita Abella Caprile (1901–1960), Argentine writer
- Margarita de Cardona (1535–1609), Spanish court official
- Margarita Carrera (1929–2018), Guatemalan writer
- Margarita Chávez Murguía (born 1959), Mexican architect and politician
- Margarita Chernomyrdina (born 1996), Russian footballer
- Margarita Chernousova (born 1996), Russian sport shooter
- Nitza Margarita Cintrón (born 1969), Chief of Space Medicine at NASA's Johnson Space Center
- Margarita Chli, Greek computer vision and robotics researcher
- Margarita Collinao (born 2003), Chilean footballer
- Margarita Colmenares (born 1957), American environmental engineer
- Margarita Conde (born 1960), Guatemalan long-distance runner
- Margarita Cordova (born 1939), Mexican American television actress
- Margarita Corona (1911–1983), Argentine actress
- Margarita Costa Tenorio (1951–2012), Spanish scientist
- Margarita Cota-Cárdenas (born 1941), American poet
- Margarita Curmina Cervera (born 1956), Mexican politician
- Margarita D'Amico (1938–2017), Venezuelan journalist, researcher, and professor
- Margarita Dabdoub Sikaffi, Honduran politician
- Margarita Darbinyan (1920–2021), Armenian historian and translator
- Margarita Dawson Stelfox (1886–1971), Irish botanist
- Margarita Diez-Colunje y Pombo (1838-1919), Colombian historian, translator, genealogist
- Margarita Drobiazko (born 1971), Lithuanian ice dancer
- Margarita Dubocovich, Argentine pharmacologist
- Margarita Dulova (born 1972), Kazakhstani biathlete
- Margarita Engle (born 1951), American children’s writer, columnist and poet
- Margarita Escarpa (born 1964), Spanish classical guitarist
- Margarita Escobar, Salvadoran politician
- Margarita Ivanovna Filanovich (born 1937), Soviet and Uzbek historian and archaeologist
- Margarita Fischer (1886–1975), American actress
- Margarita Flores Sánchez (born 1961), Mexican politician
- Margarita Fomina (born 1988), Russian curler
- Margarita Formeiro (born 1944), Argentine sprinter
- Margarita Fullana (born 1972), Spanish cyclist
- Margarita Fyodorova (1927–2016), Russian pianist
- Margarita Gabassi, Italian artist
- Margarita Galinovskaya (born 1968), Russian archer
- Margarita Gallegos Soto (born 1962), Mexican politician
- Margarita Ganeva, Bulgarian ambassador
- Margarita García Robayo (born 1980), Colombian novelist and writer
- Margarita Gerasimova (born 1951), Bulgarian volleyball player
- Margarita Geuer (born 1966), Spanish basketball player
- Margarita Gidion (born 1994), German footballer
- Margarita Gil Roësset (1908–1932), Spanish sculptor
- Margarita Gleba, archaeologist
- Margarita Golubeva (born 2001), Russian model and beauty queen
- Margarita Goncharova (born 1991), Russian Paralympic athlete
- Margarita González Saravia (born 1956), Mexican politician
- Margarita Gómez-Acebo y Cejuela (born 1935), the consort of Tsar Simeon II of Bulgaria
- Margarita Gritskova (born 1987), Russian mezzo-soprano
- Margarita Guerrero, Argentinean writer
- Margarita Henríquez (born 1991), Panamese TV personality
- Margarita Hernández (born 1985), Mexican long-distance runner
- Margarita Hranova (born 1951), Bulgarian singer
- Margarita Isabel (1943–2017), Mexican actress
- Margarita Kalmikova (born 1980), Latvian swimmer
- Margarita Karapanou (1946–2008), Greek novelist
- Margarita Klimenko (born 1979), Russian luger
- Margarita Kolosov (born 2004), German rhythmic gymnast
- Margarita Kozhina (1925–2012), Russian linguist
- Margarita Landi (1916–2004), Spanish journalist
- Margarita Laso (born 1963), Ecuadorian writer
- Margarita Lecuona (1910–1981), Cuban singer and composer
- Margarita Leoz, Spanish writer
- Margarita Letelier Cortés (born 1953), Chilean entrepreneur and politician
- Margarita Levchuk (born 1990), Belarusian opera singer
- Margarita Levieva (born 1980), Russian-American actress
- Margarita Liberaki (1919–2001), Greek writer and dramatist
- Margarita Liborio Arrazola (born 1964), Mexican politician
- Margarita Licea González (born 1959), Mexican politician
- Margarita Lilowa (1935–2012), Austrian singer and opera singer
- Margarita López, New York City politician
- Margarita López Portillo (1914–2006), Mexican novelist
- Margarita Lozano (1931–2022), Spanish writer
- Margarita Luna de Espaillat (1921–2016), Dominican composer, pianist and organist
- Margarita Luti (1493–1522), Italian mistress and model of Raphael
- Margherita Lotti-Mancini, Augustinian Nun, Stigmatist, wife and Mother
- Margarita Beatriz Luna (born 1956), Associate Justice of the Supreme Court of Mexico
- Margarita Madrigal (1912–1983), American writer
- Margarita Magaña (born 1979), Mexican actress
- Margarita Mamun (born 1995), Russian rhythmic gymnast
- Margarita Mandelstamm (1895–1962), Russian violinist
- Margarita Marbler (born 1975), Austrian freestyle skier
- Margarita Marinova, Bulgarian-born Canadian aeronautical engineer
- Margarita Marlene González Fernández, Cuban politician
- Margarita Martirena (born 1966), Uruguayan sprinter
- Margarita Maslennikova (1928–2021), Soviet cross-country skier
- Margarita Matjuhhova (born 1988), Estonian footballer
- Margarita Mayeta (born 1948), Cuban volleyball player
- Margarita de Mayo Izarra (1889–1969), Spanish writer, teacher and journalist
- Margarita del Mazo (born 1960), Spanish writer
- Margarita Mercado Echegaray (born 1980), Puerto Rican lawyer
- Margarita Michailidou (born 1987), Greek taekwondo practitioner
- Margarita Michelena (1917–1998), Mexican poet, literary critic, translator and journalist
- Margarita Miglau (1926–2013), Russian opera soprano
- Margarita Miķelsone (born 1982), Latvian badminton player
- Margarita Miniati (1821–1887), Greek scholar and writer
- Margarita Monet (born 1990), American singer
- Margarita Moran-Floirendo (born 1953), Miss Universe 1973 from the Philippines
- Margarita Mukasheva (born 1989), Kazakhstani runner
- Margarita Muñoz (born 1987), Colombian model and actress
- Margarita Murillo (1958–2014), Honduran human rights activist
- Margarita Nava (born 1946), Mexican equestrian
- Margarita Nazarova (disambiguation), several people
- Margarita Nelken (1894–1968), Spanish feminist and writer
- Margarita Nesterova (born 1989), Russian swimmer
- Margarita Nikolaeva (1935–1993), Soviet gymnast
- Margarita Nikolyan (born 1974), Armenian cross-country skier
- Margarita Nolasco Armas (1932–2008), Mexican anthropologist
- Margarita Nolasco Santiago (born 1948), Puerto Rican politician
- Margarita Noskova, Russian snowboarder
- Margarita Ortega (disambiguation), several people
- Margarita Osmeña (born 1949), Filipino politician
- Margarita Ostolaza, Puerto Rican politician
- Margarita Padín (1910–1993), Argentine stage and film director
- Margarita Panova (born 1998), Moldovan footballer
- Margarita Pasos (born 1965), Mexican sailor
- Margarita Pasos (born 1972), Colombian television presenter
- Margarita Pavlova (born 1979), Russian politician
- Margarita Peña (1937-2018), Mexican writer, translator and researcher
- Margarita Penón (born 1948), Costa Rican politician
- Margarita Percovich (born 1941), Uruguayan politician
- Margarita Perveņecka (born 1976), playwright
- Margarita Petrova (born 1977), Bulgarian rower
- Margarita Pilikhina (1926–1975), Russian cinematographer and educator
- Margarita Pin (born 1949), Spanish politician
- Margarita Pisano (1932–2015), Chilean architect, writer, theoretician and feminist
- Margarita Plavunova (1994–2019), Russian athlete and artists’ model
- Margarita Plevritou (born 1994), Greek water polo player
- Margarita Ponomaryova (1963–2021), Russian hurdler
- Margarita Pracatan (1931–2020), Cuban singer
- Margarita Prentice (1931–2019), American politician
- Margarita Pushkina (born 1952), Russian lyricist, writer and singer
- Margarita Ramos (born 1966), Spanish shot putter
- Margarita Rivière (1944–2015), Spanish journalist and writer
- Margarita Robles (born 1956), Spanish judge and politician
- Margarita Robles (1894–1989), Spanish screenwriter
- Margarita Rodríguez (born 1947), Cuban fencer
- Margarita Romo, activist
- Margarita Rosado, Mexican astronomer
- Margarita Salas (1938–2019), Spanish biochemist
- Margarita Saldaña Hernández (born 1964), Mexican politician
- Margarita Salicola (1660–1717), Italian opera singer
- Margarita Savitskaya (1868–1911), Russian stage actress
- Margarita Saxe-Coburg-Gotha (born 1935), Spanish aristocrat
- Margarita Sharapova (born 1962), Russian novelist and short story writer
- Margarita Shirokova (born 1991), Russian footballer
- Margarita Shtarkelova (born 1951), Bulgarian former basketball player
- Margarita Shubina (born 1966), Soviet and Russian actress and director
- Margarita Sidorenko (born 1988), Russian Paralympic archer
- Margarita Sierra (1936–1963), American singer
- Margarita Sikaffi, Honduran politician
- Margarita Simonyan (born 1980), Russian journalist
- Margarita Sofocleous (born 1986), Cypriot footballer
- Margarita Starkevičiūtė (born 1956), Lithuanian politician
- Margarita Stepanenko (born 1993), Ukrainian-born Azerbaijani volleyball player
- Margarita Stolbizer (born 1955), Argentine lawyer and politician
- Margarita Sucari (born 1962), Peruvian politician
- Margarita Suero (born 1982), female volleyball player from the Dominican Republic
- Margarita Syradoeva (born 1995), Russian cyclist
- Margarita Tacheva (1936–2008), Bulgarian historian
- Margarita Tapia (born 1976), Mexican long-distance runner
- Margarita Tapia Fonllem (born 1959), Mexican politician
- Margarita Tarradell (born 1962), Cuban sports shooter
- Margarita Ervandovna Ter-Minassian (1910–1995), Russian entomologist
- Margarita Terekhova (born 1942), Soviet and Russian actress
- Margarita Teselko (born 1965), Russian rower
- Margarita Torlopova (born 1998), Kazakh canoeist
- Margarita Trlin (born 1955), Argentine architect
- Margarita Tschomakova (born 1988), Bulgarian fencer
- Margarita Tutulani (1925–1943), Albanian partisan
- Margarita del Val (born 1959), Spanish chemist
- Margarita Vaquero (born 1965), Spanish tennis player
- Margarita Vargas (born 1960), musical artist
- Margarita Vargas López (born 1969), Chilean Kawésqar politician
- Margarita Vasileva (born 2005), Bulgarian rhythmic gymnast
- Margarita Villaescusa Rojo (born 1964), Mexican politician
- Margarita Voites (1936–2024), Estonian actress and opera singer
- Margarita Volkovinskaya, the birth name of Uzbekistani-American actress Rita Volk
- Margarita Volodina (born 1938), Soviet actress
- Margarita Voyska (born 1963), Bulgarian chess player
- Margarita Xhepa (1932–2025), Albanian stage and film actress
- Margarita Xirgu (1888–1969), Spanish stage actress
- Margarita Yakovleva (born 1981), Ukrainian journalist, poet and writer
- Margarita Yelisseyeva (born 1992), Kazakhstani weightlifter
- Margarita Yushko (born 1998), Belarusian footballer
- Margarita Zavala (born 1967), former First Lady of Mexico
- Margarita Zhukova (1929–2010), Russian educator and scientist

=== Fictional characters ===
- Margarita Nikolaevna, one of the protagonists in the novel The Master and Margarita by Russian writer Mikhail Bulgakov
- Margarita Di Tullio, the protagonist in the 2026 Argentine film Pepita, La Pistolera

== See also ==
- Margarita (disambiguation)
- Margaretta (given name)
- Marguerite (given name)
