= Pilar González =

Pilar González may refer to:

- Pilar González (artist) (born 1955), Uruguayan painter, illustrator, and visual artist
- Pilar Ayuso González (born 1942), Spanish politician
- Pilar González de Gregorio (born 1957), Spanish noblewoman, writer and socialite
- Pilar González i Duarte (born 1945), Spanish chemist
- Pilar González Modino (born 1962), Spanish politician
