= Roser Gonzàlez i Duarte =

Catalan geneticist

Roser González i Duarte
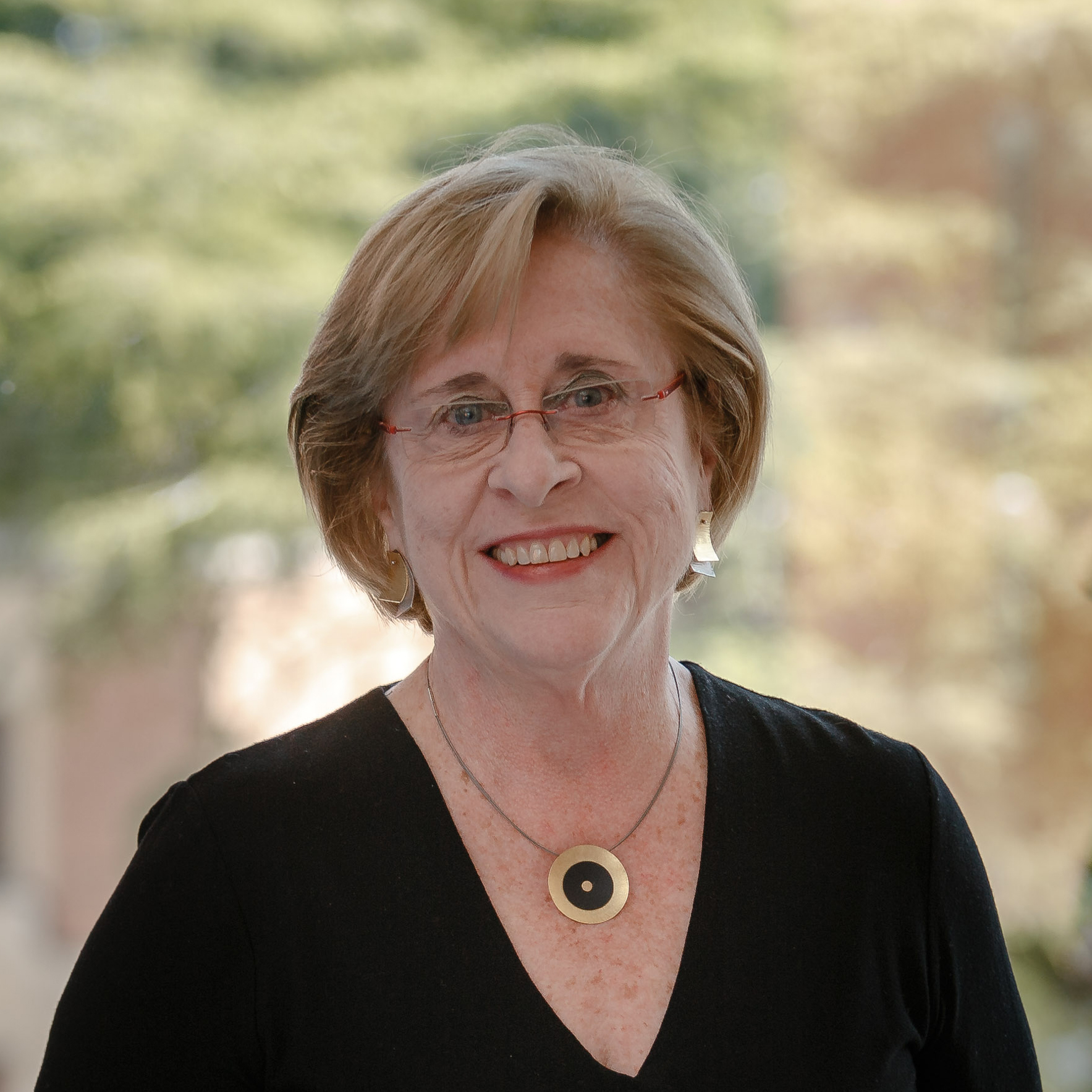
- Born: 26 January 1945; Barcelona, Spain
- Died: 17 June 2025 (aged 80); Barcelona, Spain
- Education: University of Barcelona and University of Edinburgh
- Relatives: Pilar Gonzàlez i Duarte (twin sister, Catalan chemist), Mª José González i Duarte (sister, MD. dermatologist)
- Awards: First recipient of the Leandre Cervera Award, Catalan Society of Biology (2022); Appointed Honorary Member of the Catalan Association of Biologists (CBC) (2023)
- Scientific career
- Fields: Genetics

Roser Gonzàlez i Duarte (Barcelona, 26 January 1945-17 June 2025) was a Catalan geneticist and a pioneer in the diagnosis of hereditary ocular pathologies and retinal dystrophies. She was the founder and director of DBGen Ocular Genomics, a leading company in the genetic diagnosis of ocular diseases, and full professor at the University of Barcelona.

== Career ==
=== Research career ===
González-Duarte earned her degree in Chemical Sciences from the University of Barcelona in 1967 and completed her PhD in Biology in the Department of Genetics at the same university in 1972. She then undertook a two-year postdoctoral stay in the Department of Molecular Biology at the University of Edinburgh. Upon her return to Spain in 1974, she began her teaching career as an interim professor in the Department of Genetics at the University of Barcelona, where she introduced the subject of Molecular Genetics in the Faculty of Biology. In 1988, she was appointed Professor of Genetics, a position she held until her retirement.

Her research initially focused on the biochemistry and evolution of genes and proteins involved in alcohol metabolism in Drosophila, later shifting to human molecular genetics, specifically the identification and functional characterization of genes responsible for hereditary retinal diseases. She served as head of the CIBERER (Biomedical Research Networking Center for Rare Diseases) unit from 2006 to 2017. In January 2018, she co-founded DBGen Ocular Genomics, a company specializing in the genetic diagnosis of hereditary ocular pathologies using next-generation sequencing (NGS) techniques—methods that have enabled the identification of over 500 genes responsible for inherited blindness, affecting approximately 1 in 3,000 people worldwide (around 4 million individuals). –. Her team first developed the Chip-DR, a tool for co-segregation analysis using SNP genetic markers to identify candidate genes in affected families. With the advent of mass sequencing, they applied their expertise to interpret previously unidentified genetic variants, providing genetic diagnoses for patients and families who had not been diagnosed using conventional methods.

González-Duarte published around 160 articles in prestigious international scientific journals (collectively receiving over 6,000 citations), supervised about twenty doctoral theses, and was the principal investigator on more than 60 research projects.

=== Academic career ===
In terms of academic and university management, she served as director of the Department of Genetics for a total of 12 years at different times. She was also president of the Spanish Genetics Society from 1994 to 1998. She was a member of the Bioethics and Law Observatory, a founding member of the Bioethics Commission of the University of Barcelona, and president of the Research Evaluation Commission for Life Sciences at the Agency for the Quality of the University System of Catalonia (AQU, 2007–2012). She was a co-founder and treasurer of the Board of Directors of the Association of Women Researchers and Technologists (AMIT), , director of the Molecular Genetics research group at the UB’s Department of Genetics since 1988, and head of the genetic diagnosis unit at the Institute of Molecular Microsurgery (IMO) for several years.

In 2022, she received the Leandre Cervera Award for Professional Career from the Catalan Society of Biology in recognition of her extensive academic and scientific career. In 2023, she was named an Honorary Member by the College of Biologists of Catalonia (CBC).
