= Rubira =

Rubira is a surname. Notable people with it include:

== Surname ==
- Carlos Rubira Infante (1921–2018), Ecuadorian singer-songwriter
- Cindy Kimberly Rubira Adsuar (born 1998), Spanish and Dutch model and influencer
- Margarita Brender Rubira (1919-2000), Romanian architect based in Catalonia
