= Erika Torregrossa =

Human rights lawyer

- Erika Torregrossa Acosta
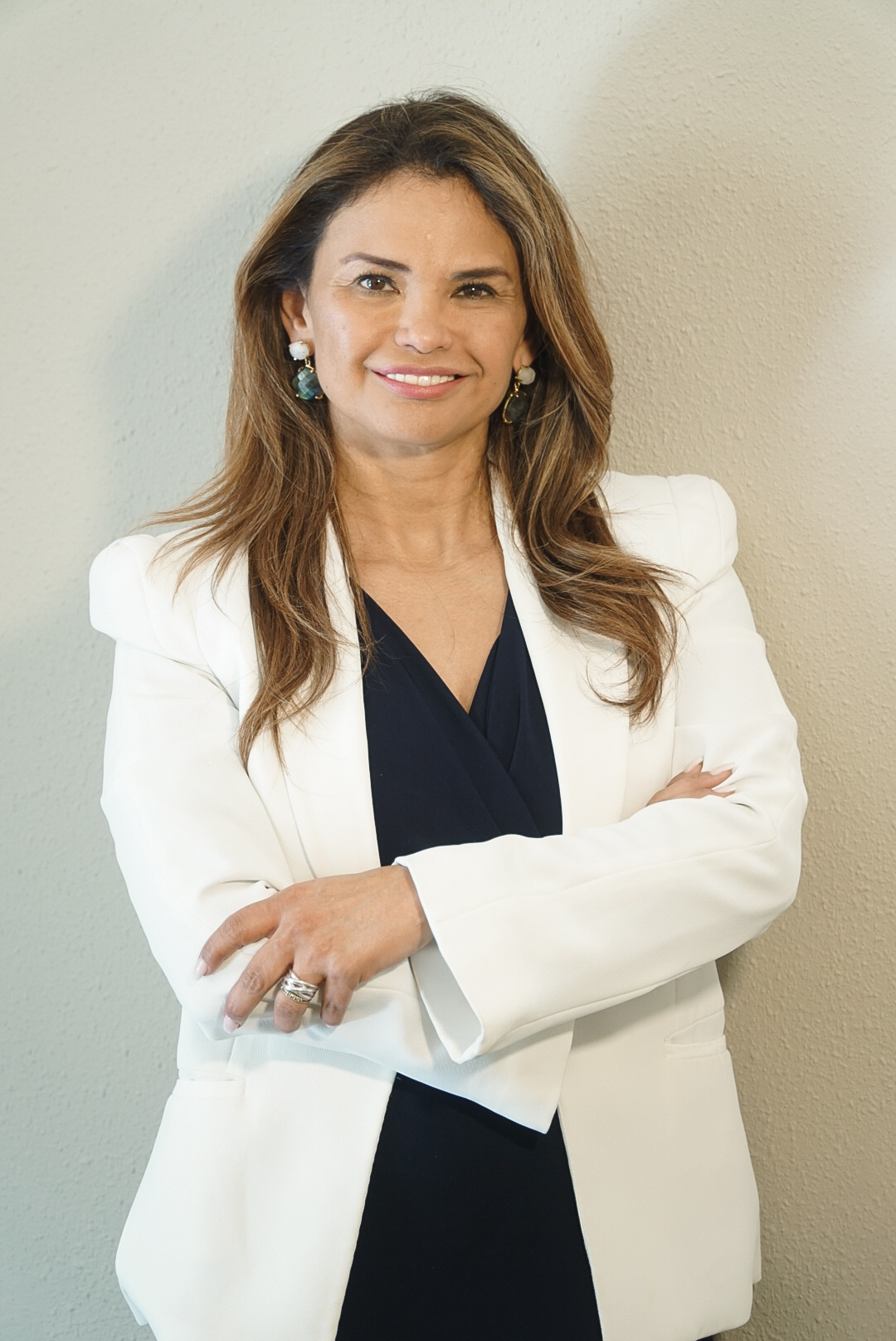
- Born: 1973 (age 52–53); Bogotá, Colombia
- Education: University of Barcelona; Autonomous University of Barcelona
- Occupations: Human Rights lawyer; Corporate diplomacy expert
- Organization: Diplocorp
- Awards: Spanish Human Rights Association Award (2023)
- Website: https://erikatorregrossa.com/

Erika Torregrossa (born Bogotá, Colombia, 1973) is a human rights lawyer and corporate diplomacy expert. She is the founder and chief executive officer of the consulting firm Diplocorp. She is also the president of the Rights Observatory of the Bar Association of Barcelona (ICAB) and the Human Rights Section of the Bar Association of Madrid (ICAM). She has received the Spanish Human Rights Association Award (2023) and other recognitions.

== Biographical information ==
She was born in Bogotá, Colombia, and is the granddaughter of the Spanish lawyer Antonio Torregrosa, who was a Republican exile in Colombia, and the artist and diplomat Luis Alberto Acuña. She has been based in Spain since 1986, when she arrived in Barcelona at the age of 13. She has a law degree from the University of Barcelona and a master's degree in leadership for political management and communication from the Autonomous University of Barcelona.

== Professional career ==
Specialising in human rights and international humanitarian law, as well as the intersection of human rights and business, she served as Secretary General of the BPI-ICP-CAPI (International Criminal Bar) from 2015 to 2018. A dual-career civil servant for the Generalitat de Catalunya, she worked as a lawyer for the Generalitat between 2002 and 2017, and as chief of staff for the Dean of the ICAB between 2017 and 2020.

She was director of the cabinet of the Secretary of State for Migration in the Government of Spain in 2020, and was part of the cabinet of both the Minister of Inclusion, Social Security and Migration (2020–2021) and the Secretary of State for International Cooperation of the Ministry of Foreign Affairs (2021–2024).

She was a Senate candidate, ranking second on Carme Chacón's list in 2015. Since 2024, she has been the founder and executive director of Diplocorp, a consulting firm specialising in corporate diplomacy, reputation management, sustainability and human rights. She has chaired the ICAB's Observatory on Human Rights and the ICAM's Human Rights Section since 2022, and was previously chair of the ICAB's Commission on International Criminal Justice and Human Rights.

She is an Associate Professor of Criminal Law at the University of Barcelona, where she teaches Criminal Enforcement, Criminology and Human Rights, and at the Open University of Catalonia (UOC), where she teaches on the Criminology and Law degree programmes.

She participated in the Colombian Peace Process as an advisor to victims abroad, for which she received the University of Sinú Award in recognition of her contribution to peace in Colombia. She regularly lectures at international universities on human rights, humanitarian law and prison law. She regularly contributes to various media outlets, including El Periódico, eldiario and TV3, on international social and legal issues.

== Awards ==
She has received various awards and recognition. In 2023, she was honoured twice by the Colombian Embassy in Spain as an Outstanding Colombian, and by the Spanish Human Rights Association. Recognised as one of the 100 most influential women in the legal sector in 2024 by Todojuristas, she is also the recipient of the 2021 Award for the Integration of Latin American Women in Catalonia, and the 2013 Award for Leadership in Favour of Coexistence, Social Inclusion and Integration, awarded by Salón Perú-Casa de América Catalunya.
