= Gema Climent =

Spanish psychologist and entrepreneur

Gema Climent (born in Sagunto, Valencia, Spain in 1971) is a Spanish psychologist and technology entrepreneur in the field of clinical neuropsychology. She is known for her work in the development of neuropsychological tests in virtual reality and treatments in active distraction and bullying prevention.

== Career ==
Climent completed her undergraduate studies in Psychology at the University of Valencia. Later on, she studied Clinical Neuropsychology at the Autonomous University of Barcelona and Child Neuropsychology at the University of La Rioja.

During her career as a specialist in clinical neuropsychology, she has participated in projects as head of residences, in the judicial forensic field, and also in the evaluation and rehabilitation of brain damage. She has worked in several reference clinics in Spain as a specialist in the evaluation of neurological disorders in children and adults.

She has written more than 30 scientific articles related to this area. She is the author of four neuropsychological assessment tests: Aula (attentional processes in children), Aquarium (attentional processes in adults), Ice Cream (executive functions) and Suite (memory processes). She is also the creator of a bullying prevention system with the serious video game, Monité, together with Daniel Nesquens, and of a pain distraction and anxiety management system, Isla Calma.

She has also worked on the design of video games and technological applications, including an application to prevent sexist behavior among teenagers. She has been a speaker and lecturer at several universities.

Gema Climent co-founded the virtual reality business Nesplora in 2008. She has worked in public and private entities oriented to the evaluation and treatment of cognitive functions such as Matia Instituto Gerontológico. She's a forensic psychologist in the administration of justice.

In 2020 she joined Giuntipsy as a product manager to create new neuropsychological tests.

== Awards ==
As CEO of Nesplora, Gema became finalist of the EU Prize for Women Innovators in 2017. "This prize recognises women entrepreneurs who have developed and brought to market an outstanding innovation." Nesplora was awarded the Witsa Emerging Technologies Solutions prize in February, 2018 for "analysing human behaviour using immersive technologies." Gema Climent is one of the Forbes Europe's Top 50 Women in Tech for 2018. She was awarded the prize Toribio Echevarría to business trajectory in October, 2018. The Toribio Echevarría awards "are organised with the aim of: recognising the work of enterprising people the efforts, sacrifices, risks assumed promoting entrepreneurship, motivating toward business creation and development." They "aim to support and drive the realities of technological creation and innovation" with relevance to the Basque Country.

This award has been recognized for leading the revolution in the field of neuroscience and psychology, demonstrating that it is an innovative science and that it is being built, as a modern, adaptive and growing science, with possibilities of creating new contributions to the better understanding of the brain and people.

== Scientific publications ==
=== Articles in indexed journals ===
- Climent, G., Rodríguez, C., García, T., Areces, D., Mejías, M., Aierbe, A., ... & Feli González, M. (2021). A New virtual reality tool (Nesplora Aquarium) for assessing attention and working memory in adults: A normative study. Applied Neuropsychology: Adult, 28(4), 403-415.
- Iriarte, Y., Diaz-Orueta, U., Cueto, E., Irazustabarrena, P., Banterla, F., & Climent, G. (2016). AULA—Advanced virtual reality tool for the assessment of attention: Normative study in Spain. Journal of Attention Disorders, 20(6), 542-568.
- Camacho-Conde JA, Legarra L, Bolinches VM, Cano P, Guasch M, Llanos-Torres M, Serret V, Mejías M, Climent G. Assessment of Attentional Processes in Patients with Anxiety-Depressive Disorders Using Virtual Reality. Journal of Personalized Medicine. 2021; 11(12):1341. https://doi.org/10.3390/jpm11121341
- Jose Antonio Camacho-Conde & Gema Climent (2022) Attentional profile of adolescents with ADHD in virtual-reality dual execution tasks: A pilot study, Applied Neuropsychology: Child, 11:1, 81-90, doi:10.1080/21622965.2020.1760103
