= Autonomous University of Barcelona =

Public university in Catalonia, Spain

- Universitat Autònoma de Barcelona; Universidad Autónoma de Barcelona
- The university's Catalan logo
- Motto: Aposta pel coneixement i la innovació
- Type: Public university
- Established: 6 June 1968
- Affiliations: Vives Network; ECIU; EUA; CRUE; Venice International University
- Budget: €321.5 million (2019)
- Rector: Javier Lafuente
- Academic staff: 3,262
- Students: 37,166
- Location: Plaça Cívica, Campus de la UAB, 08193, Bellaterra, Cerdanyola del Vallès, Vallès Occidental, Catalonia, Spain
- Campus: Urban
- Colours: Pantone 355 C & Process black
- Website: www.uab.cat

University rankings

Global – Overall
- ARWU World: 301-400 (2023)
- CWTS World: 247 (2022)
- QS World: 149 (2024)
- THE World: 183 (2023)
- USNWR Global: 143 (2023)

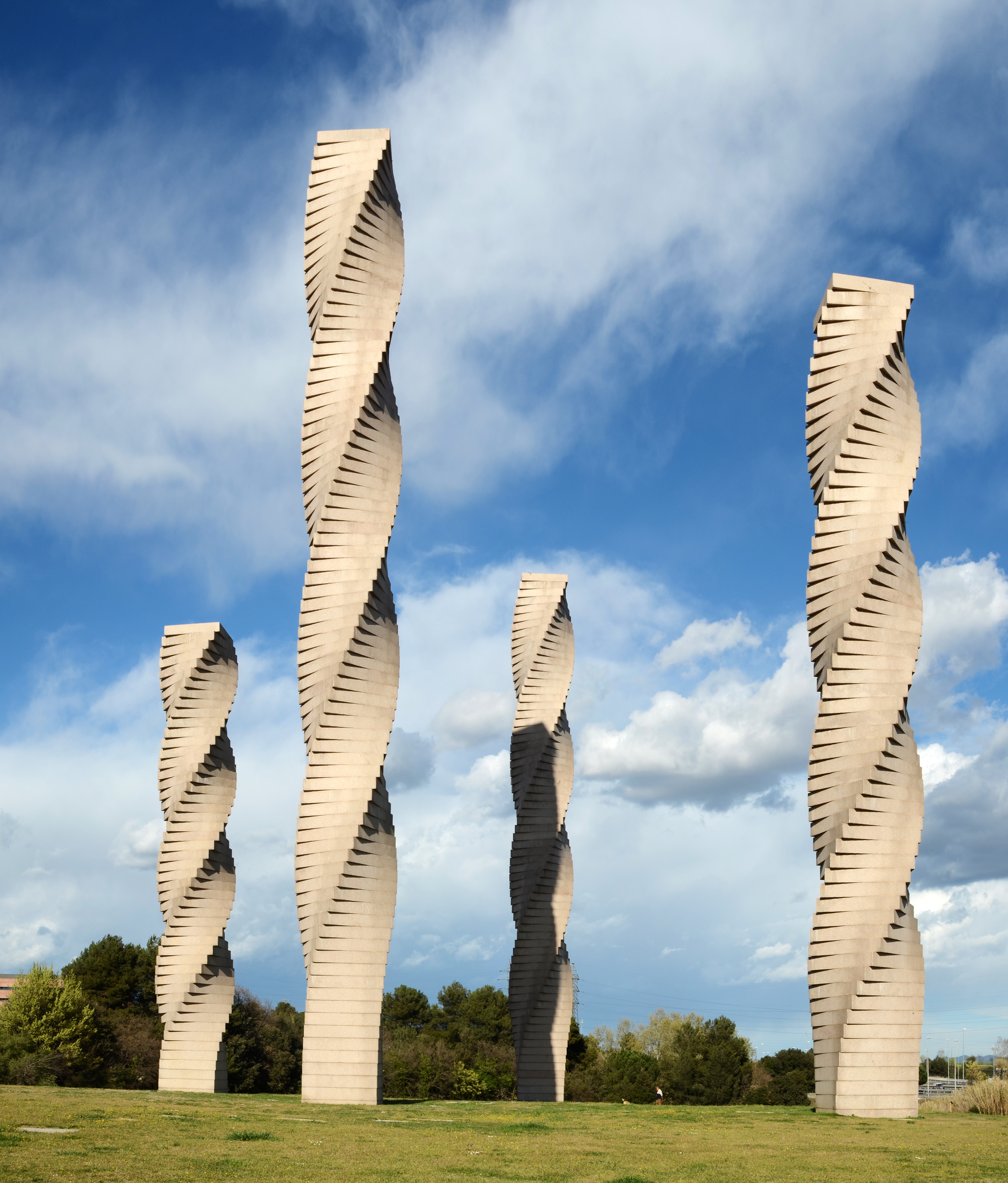
The UAB Columns, monument of the university.

The Autonomous University of Barcelona (Catalan: Universitat Autònoma de Barcelona; Spanish: Universidad Autónoma de Barcelona; Catalan pronunciation: [uniβəɾsiˈtat əwˈtɔnumə ðə βəɾsəˈlonə]; UAB [ˈu ˈa ˈβe]) is a public university mostly located in Cerdanyola del Vallès, near the city of Barcelona in Catalonia, Spain.

As of 2012, the university consists of 57 departments in the experimental, life, social and human sciences, spread among 13 faculties/schools. All these centers together award a total of 85 qualifications in the form of first degrees, diplomas, and engineering degrees. Moreover, almost 80 doctoral programmes, and more than 80 other postgraduate programs are offered. UAB has more than 40,000 students and more than 3,600 academic and research staff. UAB is a pioneering institution in terms of fostering research. There are many research institutes in the campus, as well as other research centres, technical support services, and service-providing laboratories, and the ALBA (synchrotron) located in the Barcelona Synchrotron Park is very close to UAB.

UAB is the best university in Spain according to the 2023 QS World University Rankings, which ranked the university 178th overall in the world. Its subject rankings were: 27th in Veterinary Science, 72nd in Education & Training, 73rd in Linguistics, 78th in Sociology and 88th in Economics & Econometrics. The UAB is also a degree-awarding body of the Institut Barcelona d'Estudis Internacionals (IBEI).

== Location ==
Most UAB academic activity takes place on the main campus in Cerdanyola del Vallès. Several centres exist in Manresa, Sabadell, Terrassa, Sant Cugat del Vallès and Barcelona.

The UAB campus is about 20 km (12 mi) away from the centre of Barcelona. It is accessible by air (flights to Barcelona, Girona, or Reus), by train (Ferrocarrils de la Generalitat, Renfe), by bus (SARBUS) or by car (AP-7 and C-58 motorways).

== History ==
The Autonomous University of Barcelona was officially created by legislative decree on 6 June 1968. Previously, during the Second Spanish Republic, there had been plans for constituting a second university in Barcelona, but the Civil War and the following years of poverty under the early dictatorship did not allow these plans to become a reality until that year.

On 27 July, a disposition to the decree was added, starting the creation of the Faculty of Literature, Language, Art and the Humanities, the Faculty of Medicine, the Faculty of Science, and the Faculty of Economical Sciences. Around ten weeks later, on 6 October, the first course of the Faculty of Literature, Language, Art and the Humanities was inaugurated at Sant Cugat del Vallès Monastery. During the same month, the Faculty of Medicine was created at the Hospital de Sant Pau in Barcelona.

In 1969, an agreement was signed for the acquisition of the land where the university campus is currently located. During that year, the Faculty of Sciences and the Faculty of Economical Sciences started running. During the following three years, several faculties and professional schools were created, and the construction works on the campus land took place. At the end of this period, most existing faculties and schools are settled in the campus.

At the end of the dictatorship in 1976, the university introduced a plan to create a model of a democratic, independent university, described in a document known as Bellaterra Manifesto, which included a declaration of principles. Two years later, after the approval of the Catalan Statute, the University Council agreed to recourse to the Generalitat de Catalunya.

During the period between 1985 and 1992, the university underwent several faculty reforms and the creation of several new faculties. In 1993, the University Ville was inaugurated as a student residence integrated inside the campus complex.

== Rankings ==
University rankings

Global – Overall
- ARWU World: 301–400 (2023)
- QS World: 172 (2026)
- THE World: 201–250 (2024)
- USNWR Global: =143 (2023)

Autonomous University of Barcelona has consistently been ranked in several academic rankings. The 2021 Academic Ranking of World Universities ranked the UAB 201–300 in the world and 2nd in Spain. The 2024 QS World University Rankings ranked the university 149th in the world and 1st in Spain. The 2023 Times Higher Education World University Rankings placed the university 183rd in the world, and 2nd in Spain. In U.S. News & World Report 2022 global university rankings, the university placed 144th in its world rankings, and 2nd in Spain. In U-Ranking 2021, the university was ranked 2nd in Spain based on their performance in teaching, research and innovations.

Autonomous University of Barcelona also placed in numerous rankings that evaluates the employment prospects of graduates. In QS's 2022 graduate employability ranking, the university ranked 151–160 in the world, and sixth in Spain. In the Times Higher Education's 2021 global employability ranking, the university placed 132nd in the world, and 3rd in Spain.

== Residence ==
Vila Universitària is the residential complex of the university, located on its campus, which has 812 apartments with a total accommodation capacity for 2,193 people. The apartments at Vila Universitària enjoy a privileged setting: they are located between the campus and the forest and have beautiful views, good train and bus connections and are about 45 minutes from the Plaça de Catalunya train station in Barcelona.

== UAB-approved research institutes ==
- Institut Barcelona d'Estudis Internacionals (IBEI)
- Institute of Employment Studies (IET)
- Institute of Government and Public Policy (IGOP)
- Institute of Medieval Studies (IEM)
- Institute of Biotechnology and Biomedicine (IBB)
- Institute of Educational Sciences (ICE)
- Institute of Environmental Sciences and Technologies (ICTA)
- Institute of Neuroscience (INc)
- Sports Research Institute (IRE)

== Library ==
The UAB has nine university libraries, eight of which are on the Bellaterra Campus, and the other on the Sabadell Campus.

- Science and Technology Library
- Social Sciences Library
- Humanities Library
- General Map Library
- European Documentation Center
- Communication Library and General Newspaper and Periodicals Library
- Library of Medicine
- Veterinary Library
- Sabadell University Library

== Computer Vision Center ==
Computer Vision Center is a computer vision research centre based at UAB. It was established in 1994 by the Generalitat de Catalunya and UAB. In 2002, the commenced publication of Electronic Letters on Computer Vision and Image Analysis. It participated in the Pascal Challenge in 2009.

== Port d'Informació Científica (PIC) ==
The Port d'Informació Científica (Catalan for "Scientific Information Port") is a research centre and institution at the campus of the Universitat Autonoma de Barcelona. Founded in 2003, its activity has been closely related to the development and exploitation of computing resources for the Worldwide LHC Computing Grid (WLCG). A collaboration of IFAE (High Energy Physics Institute of the Universitat Autonoma de Barcelona) and CIEMAT (Centro de Investigaciones Energéticas Medioambientales and Tecnológicas), it is supported by regional (Catalan) and national (Spanish) research governing authorities.

The main scientific project PIC is associated to, in terms of utilisation of computing resources, is the deployment, operations and maintenance of the Spanish Tier 1 site for the WLCG, supporting the ATLAS, CMS and LHCb experiments of the LHC at CERN. PIC researchers and computing experts hence contribute to the development of Grid Computing technologies, as required by the computing needs of these experiments. Other projects in which PIC researchers are involved include computing support for Astrophysics and Cosmology experiments (such as MAGIC, PAU and DES) and computing techniques for medical imaging.

== Notable faculty ==
- Margarita Arboix, pharmacology department of the Faculty of Medicine
- Jaume Casals (born 1958), professor of philosophy
- Maria Dolors García Ramón (born 1943), geographer
- Miren Etxezarreta, economist
- Pilar González i Duarte (born 1945), chemist (also alumnus)
- Adriana Kaplan Marcusán (born 1956), director of the NGO Wassu Gambia Kafo (WGK) and the university's Wassu Foundation
- Martí de Riquer i Morera (1914–2013), linguist
- Joan Martinez Alier (born 1939), professor
- Giorgos Kallis (born 1972), researcher and professor

== Notable alumni ==
- D. Sam Abrams (born 1952), poet, translator and critic
- Matilde Asensi (born 1962), journalist and writer
- Lola Badia (born 1951), philologist, medievalist
- Maria Badia i Cutchet (born 1947), politician
- Mònica Bernabé (born 1972), journalist
- Javier Calvo (1973), writer
- Mariana Castells (living), Spanish-American allergist
- Carlos Cordon-Cardo (born 1957), bio-medical scientist
- Gema Climent (born 1971), scientist, tech entrepreneur
- Carlota Escutia Dotti, geologist
- Cristina Fallarás (born 1968), journalist and writer
- Francesc Homs Molist (born 1969), politician
- Irene Rigau (born 1951), politician
- Ramon Espadaler Parcerisas (born 1963), politician
- Marisol Prado (born 1968), physician, psychiatrist and academic
- Mar Reguant (born 1984), economist
- Fátima Rodríguez (b. 1961), writer, translator
- Simona Škrabec (born 1968), critic, essayist and translator
- Oriol Junqueras (born 1969), historian and politician
- Xavier Sala-i-Martin (born 1962), economist
- Oleguer Presas (born 1980), footballer
- Montserrat Soliva Torrentó (1943-2019), professor
- María Josefa Yzuel Giménez (born 1940), professor
- Belkis Valdman (1942-2011), chemical engineer and academic
- Erika Torregrossa, lawyer

== See also ==
- Vives Network
- List of universities in Spain
- Barcelona Graduate School of Economics
- Institut Barcelona d'Estudis Internacionals
