= Mariana Castells =

Spanish-American allergist

- Maria Concepcion Castells
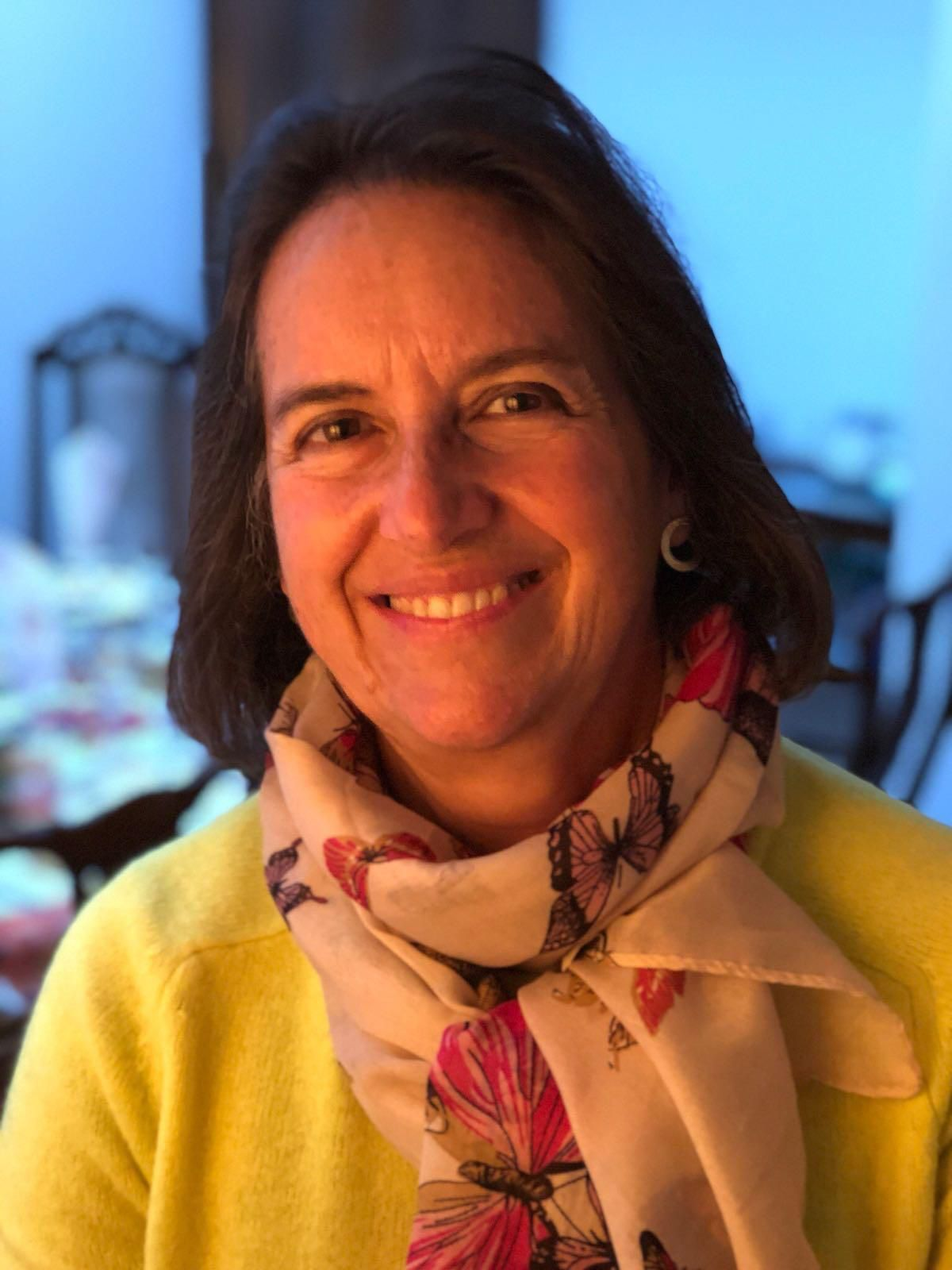
- Education: Autonomous University of Barcelona
- Known for: mastocytosis, drug desensitization
- Scientific career
- Fields: allergy and immunology
- Workplaces: Harvard Medical School, Brigham and Women's Hospital

Mariana Castells is a Spanish-American allergist who focuses on mast cell diseases, including mastocytosis, mast cell activation syndrome and hereditary alpha tryptasimia. Mastocytosis is a rare disease with limited treatment options. Castells works at Brigham and Women's Hospital in Massachusetts in the Department of Allergy, Rheumatology, and Immunology and at the Dana Farber Cancer Institute. She is also a professor of medicine at Harvard Medical School.

== Education ==
Castells attended medical school at Autonomous University of Barcelona, Spain and was a resident at University of Kansas Medical Center. She also has a PhD.

== Career ==
Castells is a leader in the mastocytosis treatment and research field, and directs both the Mastocytosis Center of Excellence and the Drug Hypersensitivity and Desensitization Center at Brigham and Women's Hospital. She is also part of the medical advisory board for The Mastocytosis Society. Castells leads clinical trials related to both mast cell disease and drug desensitization. In her desensitization research, she works to reduce allergic reactions to chemotherapy and other kinds of drugs.

Castells is often quoted as an expert in media articles about seasonal environmental allergies.

== Honors and awards ==
- James S. Winshall, MD, Leadership Award, 2016
- American Academy of Allergy, Asthma and Immunology (AAAAI) Board of Directors
