= Nesplora Aula (test) =

Psychological test

Nesplora Aula is a psychological test in virtual reality that measures attentional processes in children from 6 to 16 years of age. It is a level III C Continuous Performance Test (CPT) that combines auditory and visual stimuli in a virtual environment: a school classroom, alive and organic, with the distractors of that environment. It evaluates in approximately 20 minutes, among other variables, attention, impulsivity, processing speed, the tendency to distraction and motor activity during the task. The person being evaluated is immersed in virtual reality through a helmet with movement sensors and lightweight 3D glasses.

It was created in 2011 by Climent & Banterla at Nesplora, a Spanish company that specialized in neuropsychological assessment with virtual reality. It has been used and referenced in international reference publications.

== Psychometric Properties ==
=== Rating ===
The normative study was developed with 1326 schoolchildren and published in the Journal of Attention Disorders.

=== Ecological validity ===
Virtual reality increases ecological validity, decreases rater and administration biases, provokes real immersion, increases motivation, and decreases false negatives.

=== Convergent validity ===
The tests with which the correlation tests and their respective averages were performed were the Caras test, with an average of .835, the D-2 test, with an average of .754, the Conners CPT (1995) with an average of .773, and the EDAH (Evaluation of Attention Deficit Hyperactivity Disorder) with an average between .406 and .544 in the inattention variable, and the TOVA (Test of Variables of Attention).

=== Sensitivity ===
Correctly identifies children with ADHD (Attention Deficit Hyperactivity Disorder) in 68.1% of cases and correctly rules out those without the disorder in 75.3% of cases.

=== Reliability ===
Cronbach's α reliability coefficient was 0.978. The ANOVA test result indicates that the items correctly discriminate between children in the normative group; Visual Adequacies Scale, with 186 items and a Cronbach's α coefficient of 0.966, the scale presents high reliability and high internal consistency.

== History ==
Until the advent of digital tools, there were no specific cognitive, metabolic or neurological markers or medical tests to diagnose Attention Deficit Hyperactivity Disorder (ADHD), first described by George Still in 1902 at the Royal College of Physicians in London.

One of the leading experts in the development of digital tools for the diagnosis of attention-deficit is Russell Barkley who has developed an instrument for the assessment of deficits in executive functions from the age of 18.

The first tool that used virtual reality was neither standardized nor adapted as a psychometric test, but oriented to the research and treatment of ADHD. Albert Rizzo and his team created it.

The authors of Nesplora Aula, Gema Climent and Flavio Bánterla, began developing the tool as a research project to adapt the traditional tests that evaluate attentional processes to a more dynamic and audiovisual format than the traditional paper and pencil, which could be more attractive to schoolchildren.

They reviewed what had been done in this regard, at an international level, and found in 2010 that there was no test on the market except for Rizzo's research and a research thesis at the University of Barcelona. Giunti Nesplora's next step was to try to adapt an external software to a compact tool with a specific task or objective that could be measured. Faced with this challenge, the company decided to create its software.

The first experimental study was carried out with 300 schoolchildren, obtaining information on the optimal execution time, the symbols that presented problems or ambiguities, the effectiveness of the designed distractors and the response generated by the children; the suitability of the glasses, the movements executed, and the difference between control samples and samples of boys and girls diagnosed with ADHD were also assessed. Subsequently, the study was carried out with 1500 schoolchildren. After all these tests and the search for the best hardware devices of the moment, the tool known as Nesplora Aula was arrived at in 2011.

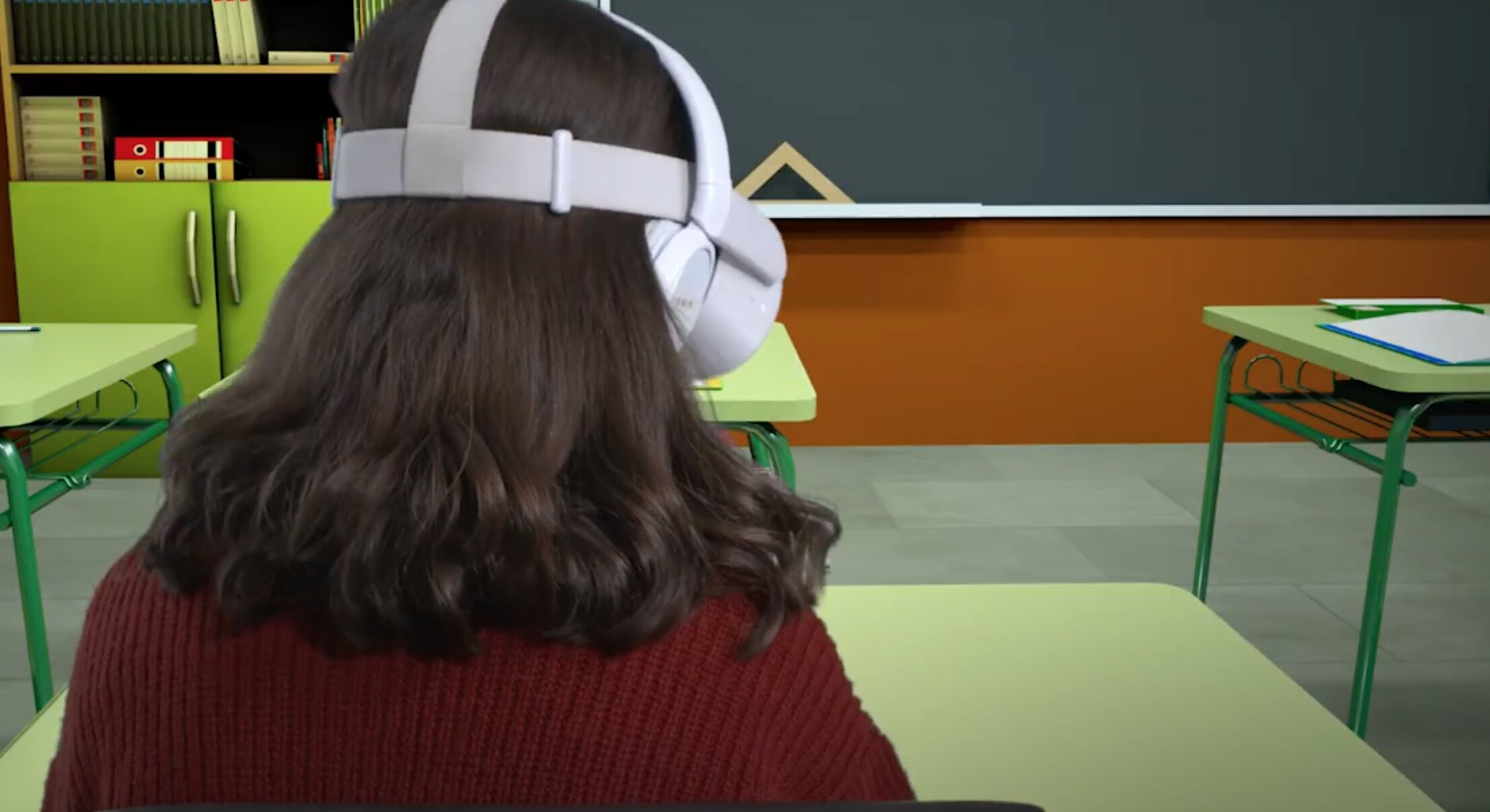
Girl taking the Nesplora Aula test

== Scores ==
The attentional processes assessment test collects scores in different experimental situations to compare performance, and produces an automatic report with explanatory tables and graphs to describe the complete attentional profile. It measures the following variables:

- Sustained attention: ability to focus attention on one point and concentrate over time to perform a certain task or action.
- Selective attention: ability to distinguish between relevant and irrelevant stimuli to discard information and keep what is useful.
- Switching attention: ability to switch between different points of attention, related to working memory.
- Inhibitory control: ability to inhibit impulses and regulate behavior.
- Consistency of response: the ability to be constant in response times. Inconsistency is associated with fatigue, distraction, or lack of regulation.
- Vigilance and alertness: ability to react to a stimulus.
- Processing speed: ability to respond at lower or higher response times.
- or higher times.
- Tendency to distraction: interference in the presence of distracting visual and auditory stimuli placed for this purpose.
- Motor activity: Quantification of the subject's motor movement.

== Uses ==
As an assessment tool, Nesplora Aula contributes to clinical analysis in diagnosing disorders of different conditions: anxiety, behavioral and social skills problems, reading and writing problems, learning difficulties, brain damage, ADHD. Its areas of application are clinical psychology, educational psychology, neuropsychology, child psychiatry, forensic psychology, traffic psychology, sports psychology, and psychopedagogy.

The test applies to persons aged 6 to 16 years. The audio for the instructions is available in Spanish, with different accents (Spanish, Argentinean, Mexican, Chilean, Peruvian and Colombian), Basque, Catalan, and English, available in accents (American and British) Romani, Arabic, French, Italian, Turkish and Portuguese.

The test complies with the essential requirements set out in Council Directive 93/42/EEC, as amended by Directive 2007/47/EC, and with the essential requirements of the EN ISO 13485 standard for quality management systems for medical devices. These certifications allow to use of Nesplora Aula and certify its value in any clinical, forensic or research process.

== Limitations ==
The Nesplora Aula tool suffers from the limitations presented by the hardware required for its use: its useful life, need for technical support and calibration, need for computer hardware, dependence on the battery, dependence on the internet connection, need for updates to access improvements, possible problems in patients sensitive to light stimuli and in patients with severe intellectual deficits that prevent them from understanding the test instructions or with mobility restrictions that prevent them from manipulating the equipment.

== Recognitions ==
- WITSA 2018. Global ICT Excellence Awards. Emerging Digital Solutions Award.
- EU Seal of Excellence.

== See also ==
- Virtual reality
- ADHD

== Related links ==
- Official site
