= Carlos Cordon-Cardo =

Spanish-born American physician and scientist

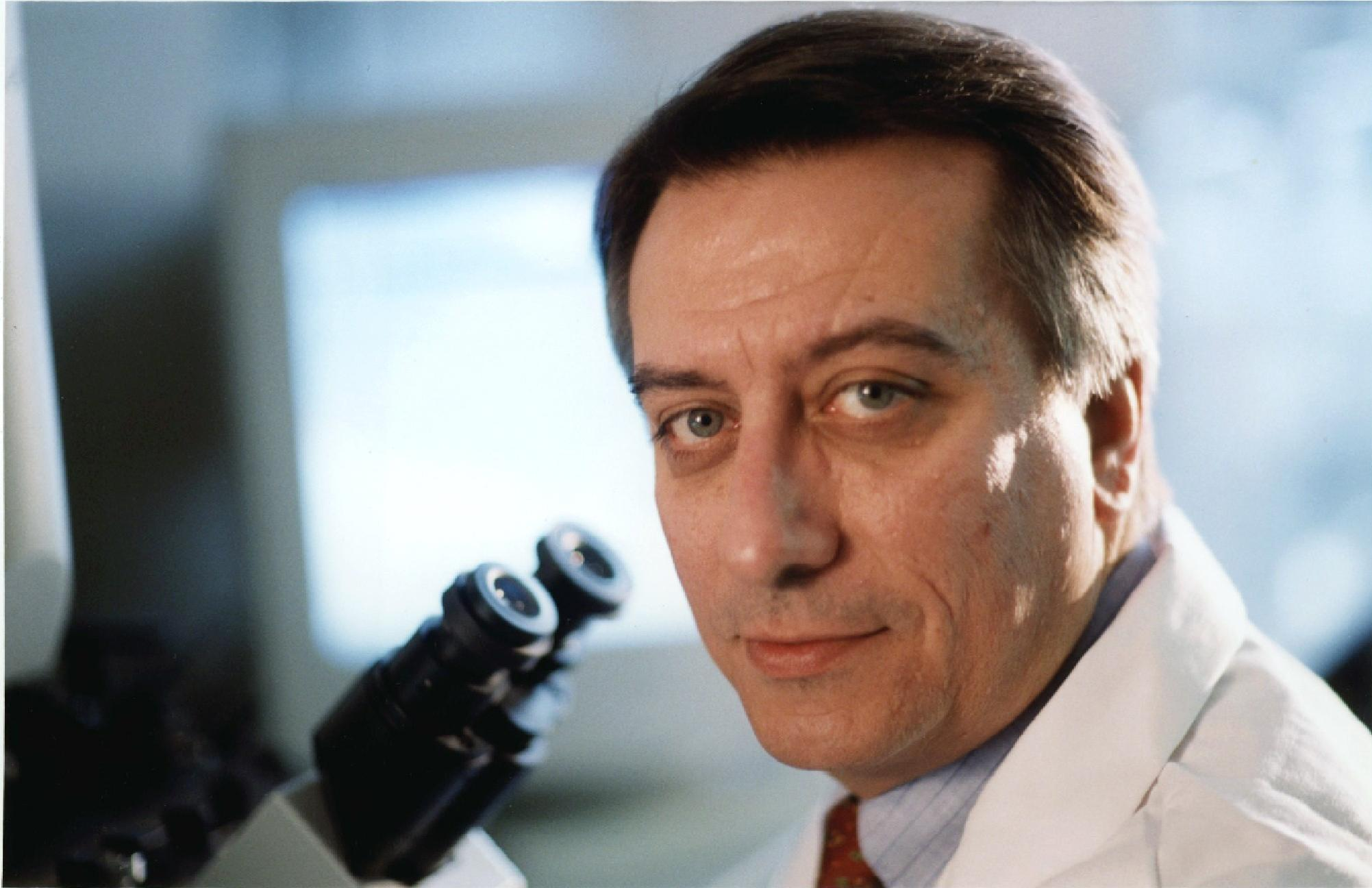
- Born: February 25, 1957 (age 69); Calella, Spain
- Education: Autonomous University of Barcelona (MD); Cornell University (PhD)
- Scientific career
- Fields: Experimental pathology; Molecular oncology
- Workplaces: Sloan Kettering Cancer Center; Columbia University; Icahn School of Medicine at Mount Sinai

Carlos Cordon-Cardo (born February 25, 1957) is a Spanish-born American physician and scientist known for his research in experimental pathology and molecular oncology. He holds the "Irene Heinz Given and John LaPorte Given" Chair in Pathology at Mount Sinai School of Medicine.

== Life and career ==
Cordon-Cardo was born in Calella, a seaside town in the Province of Barcelona and was determined to study medicine and pathology from his childhood days when he asked for a microscope for his 10th birthday. He enrolled in the Autonomous University of Barcelona medical school in 1975 and received his MD in 1980. With the encouragement of his mentor at the university and the assistance of a fellowship from the Spanish Government, he then went to Cornell University Medical College for graduate work in pathology, cell biology and genetics.

After earning his PhD from Cornell in 1985 with his dissertation Immunoanatomic Dissection of the Normal Human Adult Kidney and Urinary Tract, Cordon-Cardo became a research fellow in immunopathology at the Memorial Sloan Kettering Cancer Center. He worked there for over 20 years, creating the center's division of molecular pathology in 1995 and serving as its first director. In 2006, he joined the faculty of Columbia University College of Physicians and Surgeons as Chernow Professor of Clinical Urological Sciences and Professor of Clinical Pathology and Cell Biology in the Institute for Cancer Genetics. He remained at Columbia until 2011 when he moved to Mount Sinai School of Medicine to become the "Irene Heinz Given and John LaPorte Given" Professor of Pathology.

Cordon-Cardo married Alicia Bouzan in 1990. A breast cancer survivor and active in a number of cancer charities, Alicia Bouzan-Cordon died in 2009 from a rare lung disease. The couple had two children. Cordon-Cardo is himself a survivor of colon cancer to which he had a genetic predisposition. In an effort to overcome the stigma of cancer in his native Spain he wrote an article about his experiences for the Sunday magazine of the Spanish newspaper La Vanguardia in 2006. In the article, for which he won an award from the Spanish Society of Oncology, he highlighted the resources available for cancer patients and "described his feelings of fear after the diagnosis, overcoming the dread, and the support from his wife, doctors, nurses, and friends" during his treatment in 2002–2003.

In 2006 Cordon-Cardo was awarded the title of Doctor Honoris Causa from the Autonomous University of Barcelona and in 2012 received the Cornell Medical College Distinguished Alumni Award "in recognition of distinguished, lifelong contributions to biomedical research and education."

== Scientific contributions ==
Considered one of the pioneers in oncologic molecular pathology and the mechanisms of tumor suppression, Cordon-Cardo has authored or co-authored over 500 academic papers and numerous book chapters. He is on the Thomson ISI list of the top 250 researchers in Clinical Medicine and in 2013 was named to the list compiled by Stanford University and SciTech Strategies of the world's 400 most influential bio-medical scientists.

According to Dean F. Bajorin of the Sloan Kettering Cancer Center:

He was the first investigator to identify genetically distinct pathways for superficial and muscle-invasive bladder cancers. The underpinnings for these pathways were based on over a decade of studies elucidating genetic perturbations seen in low and high-grade tumors. These pathways now serve as a template for modern studies.

Several findings from Cordon-Cardo's research at Sloan Kettering have had specific implications for the treatment of cancer and experimental cancer treatment and have led to more personalized therapies, particularly for cancers of the genitourinary system. While it had been previously thought that P-glycoprotein was unique to cancer cells, Cordon-Cardo showed in 1989 that it is also present in normal cells and is exploited by cancer cells to survive chemotherapy. In 1990, he was among the first to show that the mutated gene (RB) which causes the childhood cancer retinoblastoma is also present in some adults with sarcomas but no history of retinoblastoma. He also found that the presence of the mutated gene in adult cancers was associated with a poor clinical outcome. His 1994 research in collaboration with Arnold J. Levine was one of the first examples of how mutations in the gene which regulates the tumor suppressor p53 can lead to cancer by inactivating all the normal p53, thus allowing cancer cells to grow uncontrollably. A later study by Cordon-Cardo in 1997 found that when mutated p53 and RB are both present in a tumor, it becomes very aggressive and resistant to most treatments.

== Selected publications ==
Among Cordon-Cardo's most frequently cited scientific papers are:

- Cordon-Cardo, O'Brien, Casals, et al. "Multidrug-resistance gene (P-glycoprotein) is expressed by endothelial cells at blood-brain barrier sites". Proceedings of the National Academy of Sciences of the United States of America, Vol. 86, No. 2, pp. 695–698 (1 January 1989)
- Cordon-Cardo, O'Brien, Boccia et al. "Expression of the multidrug resistance gene product (P-glycoprotein) in human normal and tumor tissues". Journal of Histochemistry and Cytochemistry, Vol. 38, No. 9, pp. 1277–1287 (September 1990)
- Cordon-Cardo. "Mutations of cell cycle regulators. Biological and clinical implications for human neoplasia". American Journal of Pathology, Vol. 147, No. 3, pp. 545–560 (September 1995)
- Cristofano, Pesce, Cordon-Cardo, Pandolfi. "Pten is essential for embryonic development and tumour suppression". Nature Genetics, Vol. 19, pp. 348–355 (1998)
- Kang, Siegel, Shu, Drobnjak, Kakonen, Cordón-Cardo, el al. "A multigenic program mediating breast cancer metastasis to bone". Cancer Cell, Vol. 3, Issue 6, pp. 537–549 (June 2003)
- He, Thomson, Hemann, Hernando-Monge, Mu, Goodson, Powers, Cordon-Cardo, et al. "A microRNA polycistron as a potential human oncogene". Nature, Vol. 435, pp. 828–833 (9 June 2005)

His single-authored book chapters include:

- Cordon-Cardo. "Monoclonal antibodies in the diagnosis of solid tumors: Studies on renal carcinomas, transitional cell carcinomas and melanoma, " in J. Russo (ed.) (1985). Immunocytochemistry in Tumor Diagnosis. Marcel Dekker Inc. ISBN 9780898387377
- Cordon-Cardo. "Immunohistochemical analysis of P-glycoprotein expression in human normal and tumor tissues," in I. Roninson (ed.) (1991). Molecular and Cellular Biology of Multidrug Resistance in Tumor Cells Plenum Publishing Corporation. ISBN 9781461366911
- Cordon-Cardo. "Molecular Biology of Sarcomas," in VT DeVita, S Hellman, SA Rosenberg (eds.) (1997). Cancer: Principles and Practice of Oncology, 5th edition. J.B. Lippincott Company. ISBN 9780397515738
- Cordon-Cardo. "Molecular Alterations in Bladder Cancer" in J Ponten (ed.) (1998). Precancer: Biology, Importance and Possible Prevention (Cancer Surveys Vol. 32). Cold Spring Harbor Laboratory Press, 1998. ISBN 9780879695408

2017 retraction. http://mcb.asm.org/content/37/18/e00365-17.short
