= Belkis Valdman =

Brazilian chemical engineer (1942–2011)

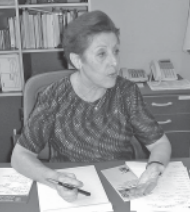
- Valdman at Federal University of Rio de Janeiro
- Born: 5 May 1942; Turkey
- Died: 1 August 2011 (aged 69); Rio de Janeiro, Brazil
- Occupations: Chemical engineer, academic

Academic background
- Education: Universidade Federal do Rio de Janeiro

Belkis Valdman (5 May 1942 – 1 August 2011) was a Turkish-born naturalised Brazilian researcher, teacher and academic chemical engineer, who worked in the field of instrumentation and process control in chemical engineering.

== Early life and education ==
Belkis Valdman was born in Turkey on 5 May 1942, the daughter of Moise Dwek and Esterina Duek (née Saragossy), one of three children, and became a naturalised Brazilian citizen in 1967.

She graduated in chemical engineering in 1966 from the then National School of Chemistry of the University of Brazil, now the School of Chemistry at Universidade Federal do Rio de Janeiro (UFRJ), where she began teaching in March of the following year. In 1968, she earned a master's degree in chemical engineering from UFRJ. In 1969, she obtained a master's degree in chemical engineering from the University of Manchester, then earned a PhD degree in chemical engineering there in 1976. She carried out post-doctoral studies in the area of bioprocesses at the Universidade Autônoma de Barcelona in 1993.

== Career ==
She held the positions of director of the Escola de Química (School of Chemistry) at the Federal University of Rio de Janeiro, later becoming pro-rector of graduation there. She was a member of the Brazilian Institute of Oil, Gas and Biofuels.

A professor at UFRJ since 1968, Valdman became a full professor in 1992, having taken on a number of significant positions within the university during her academic career. She was coordinator of post-graduate studies at the School of Chemistry (1988–1990), head of the Department of Chemical Engineering (1983–1989), director of the School of Chemistry (2002 to 2006), a member of the University Council (2003 to 2011) and pro-rector of undergraduate studies (2007–2011) during Aloisio Teixeira's second term as rector. Her management as pro-rector was characterised by a large expansion in the opportunities for a wider group of students to study at the university. Valdman was a supporter of the introduction of the Exame Nacional do Ensino Médio (National High School Exam) as a form of selection for undergraduate courses, by allowing any candidate from all over the country and from any social class to become a student at Federal University of Rio de Janeiro.

== Areas of research ==
Belkis Valdman's research fields included

- Modeling and simulation of processes and control systems;
- Integrated digital systems for simulation, control and optimization of processes;
- Development of biosensors for monitoring and detection components;
- Development of special sensors for monitoring and control of bioprocesses.

== Awards and recognition ==
- 1981 – became a member of the Instrumentation and Automation Commission of the Brazilian Petroleum Institute
- 1990 – made a Pesquisador IB by the National Council for Scientific and Technological Development (CNPq)
- 1985 and 1991 – received the Prêmio Bristol de Instrumentação do Instituto Brasileiro de Petróleo, Gás e Biocombustíveis (IBP) award
- 2007– the Assembléia Legislativa do Estado do Rio de Janeiro honoured Valdman for her services to the state of Rio de Janeiro and to the country of Brazil.

== Personal life ==
Belkis Valdman died on 1 August 2011 at São Lucas Hospital in Rio de Janeiro, and was buried at the Jewish Cemitério Israelita do Caju the following day.

== Selected publications ==
- Valdman B. "Dinamica e Controle de Processos" (1998) 1ªEd., (1999) 2ª Ed., Editora TÓRCULO Art. Gráficas S. A., Santiago de Compostela, España.
- Bojorge N., Valdman B., Acevedo F., Gentina J.C. "A semi-structured model for the growth and B-galactosidase production by fed-batch fermentation of Kluyveromyces marxianus" (1999), Bioprocess Engineering, 21, (4), 313–318.
- Salgado A M, Folly ROM, Valdman B., Valero F. "Desenvolvimento de um Biosensor Enzimático para Monitoração de Sacarose" (1999), Memórias del II Curso Int. Biotecnologia Industrial, Univ. Autonoma Metropo;itana – UAM, México, v. I, 1–4.
- Salgado A.M., Folly R.OM., Valdman B. "Biomass monitoring by use of a continuous on-line optical sensor" (2001) Sensors & Actuators B: Chemical, V.75/1-2, 24–28.
- Valdman, B. "Dinâmica e Controle de Processos" 2a. ed. 1999, 3a.Ed. 2000, Santiago de Compostela: Editora Tórculo Art. Gráficas Ltda., v.1. p. 225.
- Salgado A M., Folly R.O M., Valdman B., Cos D., Valero F. "Colorimetric method for the determination of ethanol by Flow Injection Analysis" (2000), Biotechnology Techniques, 22, (4), 327–330.
- Salgado A M., Folly R. O M., Valdman B., Valero F. "Desenvolvimento de um Biosensor Enzimático para Monitoração de Sacarose" (2000) Anais II Simp. Nac. Instrumentação Agropecuária, Ed. Embrapa, São Carlos, BR, v.I, 81–85.
