= Miren Etxezarreta =

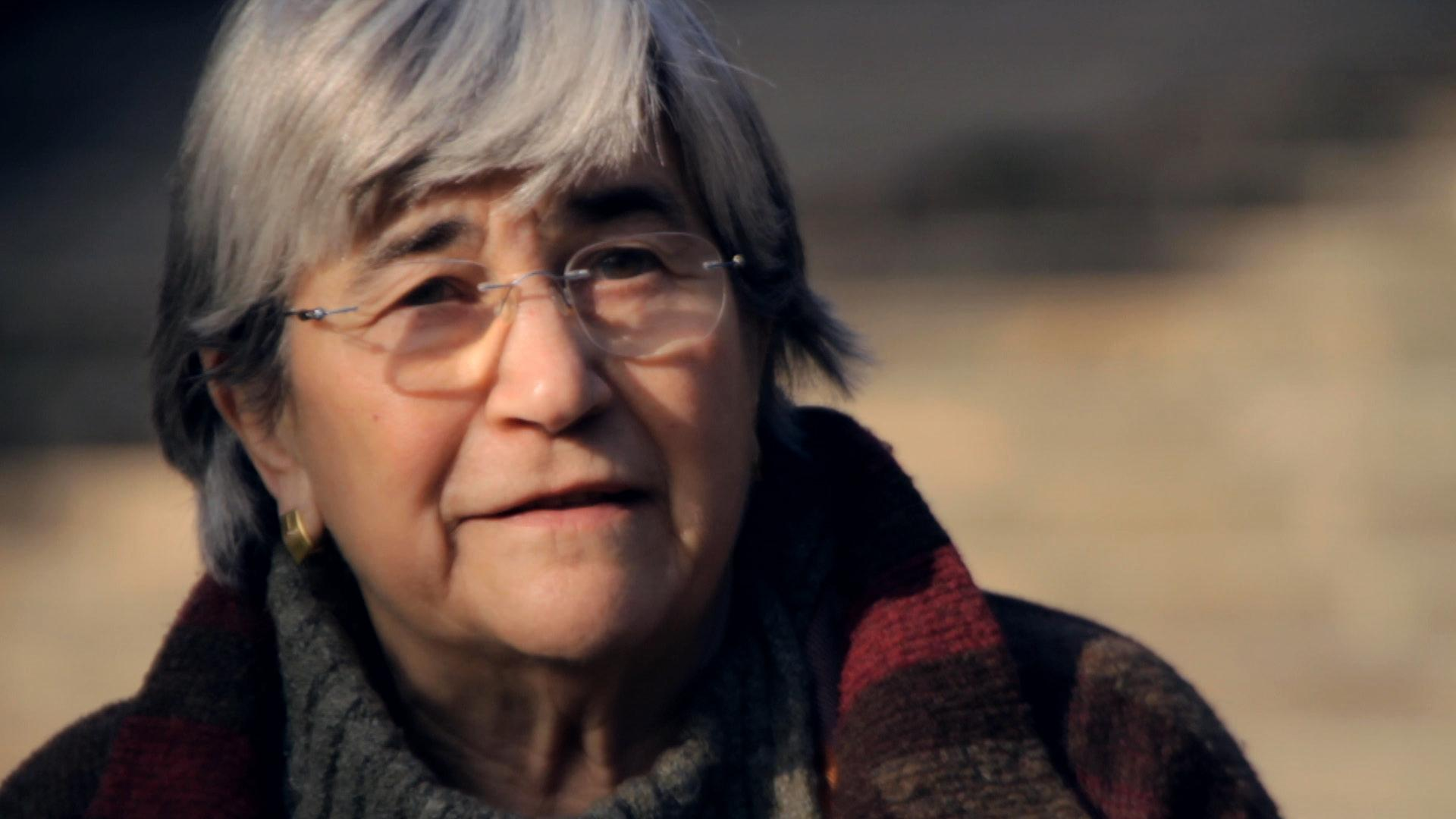
- Born: Miren Etxezarreta; 23 March 1936 (age 90); Ordizia, Gipuzkoa, Spain

Academic work
- School or tradition: Post-Keynesian economics Marxian economics

Miren Etxezarreta Zubizarreta (born 23 March 1936) is a Spanish Basque economist and intellectual of the left who is linked to social movements. Since 2007 she has been Professor Emeritus in Applied Economics at the Autonomous University of Barcelona.

She is influenced by Karl Marx, Rosa Luxemburg and post-Keynesian economists such as Joan Robinson as well as Marxist economists such as Paul A. Baran and Paul Sweezy, among others.

== Education and career ==
Etxezarreta studied at the London School of Economics, from where she has a PhD. She teaches at the Autonomous University of Barcelona.

== Personal life ==
Etxezarreta is married with a son.
