= Electronic Letters on Computer Vision and Image Analysis =

- Discipline: computer vision, image analysis, image processing
- Language: English

Publication details
- History: 2002-present
- Publisher: CVC Press (Spain)

Standard abbreviations
- ISO 4: Electron. Lett. Comput. Vis. Image Anal.

Indexing
- ISSN: 1577-5097

Links
- Journal homepage

Electronic Letters on Computer Vision and Image Analysis (usually abbreviated ELCVIA) is a peer-reviewed open-access scientific journal focusing on computer vision and image analysis (subfields of artificial intelligence) as well as image processing (a subfield of signal processing). It was established in 2002 and is published by the Computer Vision Center (Autonomous University of Barcelona).

== Indexing and abstracting ==
The journal is abstracted and indexed in the following bibliographic databases:

- Scopus
- Directory of Open Access Journals (DOAJ)

According to Scopus, the journal has a 2019 CiteScore of 0.9.

== See also ==
- EURASIP Journal on Advances in Signal Processing
