= Margarita Neri =

Mexican rebel commander

Margarita Neri was a Zapatista commander and a soldadera during the Mexican Revolution. She was a Dutch-Maya Indian from the Mexican state of Quintana Roo who was one of the few female military leaders to achieve fame during the revolution. Neri is said to have led over 1,000 soldiers in 1910 through Mexico just as if she were a man earning the utmost respect of Zapata but known for her cruelty. She commanded Zapatista forces through the Tabasco and Chiapas region during the early stages of the Mexican Revolution, and It is rumored that she once declared her intention to behead Porfirio Diaz personally.
