= Pilar González (artist) =

Uruguayan artist

- Born: November 24, 1955 (age 70); Montevideo, Uruguay
- Known for: Painting, Illustration, Costume Design
- Style: Expressionism
- Movement: Contemporary Expressionism
- Awards: Primer Gran Premio, Salón de la Nueva Gente (1975), Premio Diario El País, Certamen del Este para Joven Pintura (1976), Primer Premio de Dibuj, Embajada de España (1984), Premio Nacional de Pintura, Certamen INCA (1986), Premio 36 Salón Municipal de Montevideo (1988), Florencio Award for Ubu Rey (1998)

Pilar González is an Uruguayan painter, illustrator, and visual artist. She has developed an expressionist style twhich combines figurative and abstract elements. Her career has spanned over twenty-five years, during which she has exhibited her works in numerous solo and collective exhibitions both in Uruguay and internationally.

Her studies and career have taken her to various countries, including Spain, Italy, France, Switzerland, the United States, and Laos, where she explored different artistic movements and techniques.

== Career and artistic contributions ==
=== Painting and exhibitions ===
González's artwork uses bold color contrasts, textured paint, and distorted figures to convey human emotion and social themes. Over the years, she has participated in several national and international exhibitions, including:

- Museo Blanes, Montevideo
- MUVA (Virtual Museum of Arts of Uruguay)
- Galería Aramayo, Montevideo (1981, 1985, 1987, 1988, 1994)
- Galería Diart, Madrid, Spain (1986)
- Embajada Uruguaya en la República Argentina (1989)
- Museo de Arte Contemporáneo de Montevideo (1991, 1996, 2001)
- Centro Cultural Borges, Buenos Aires (1998)
- Bienal de Cuenca, Ecuador (1994)

Her paintings have been acquired by museums, private collectors, and have been featured in films.

=== Illustration and comics ===
Beyond painting, González is a permanent contributor as an illustrator for magazines, newspapers, and books. She has also created comics and caricatures, showcasing her versatility in visual storytelling.

== Theater and costume design ==
In addition to her work in the visual arts, González has been involved in theater productions, designing costumes, stage sets, and makeup. Over a period of four years, she received four nominations and won a Florencio Award for her contributions to theatrical productions. Notable works include:

- "Después del manzano" (1996) – Teatro Circular de Montevideo
- "Bajo el bosque de leche" (1996) – Comedia Nacional, Teatro Solís
- "Baal" (1997) – Alianza Uruguay-EE.UU
- "Ubu Rey" (1998) – Teatro Circular de Montevideo (Florencio Award for Best Costume Design)
- "Canciones para mirar" (1999) – Teatro El Galpón
- "El hombre de la esquina rosada" (2000) – Teatro Circular de Montevideo

=== Murals and public art ===
González has contributed to public art projects, including large-scale murals:

- Montevideo Shopping Center (1995, 1996)
- "Desaparecidos de América" (1999) – Urban mural for the Intendencia Municipal de Montevideo

== Teaching and cultural contributions ==
González has worked as an art educator, conducting workshops and lectures for schoolchildren and high school students. She has collaborated with the Ministry of Education and Culture of Uruguay and currently teaches at her own private studio. Her sessions focus on art appreciation and sensitivity towards artwork, often taking place at the Museum of Contemporary Art.

Her sessions focus on art appreciation and sensitivity towards artwork, often taking place at the Museum of Contemporary Art. She has also participated in panel discussions, juries, and conferences, contributing to the artistic and cultural discourse in Uruguay and abroad.

== Awards and recognitions ==
González has been recognized with numerous awards throughout her career, including:

- Primer Gran Premio, Salón de la Nueva Gente, Alianza Francesa del Uruguay (1975)
- Premio Diario El País, Certamen del Este para Joven Pintura, Museo de Arte Americano de Maldonado (1976)
- Primer Premio de Dibujo, Embajada de España, Salón de Artes Plásticas de Durazno (1984)
- Premio Nacional de Pintura, Certamen INCA, Montevideo (1986)
- Premio 36 Salón Municipal de Montevideo (1988)
- Selected for Premio Londres, Instituto Anglo Uruguayo (1993)
- Selected for Bienal de Cuenca, Ecuador (1994)
- Florencio Award, Best Costume Design for "Ubu Rey" (1998)
