= Margarita Filanovich =

Soviet and Uzbek historian, archaeologist

Margarita Ivanovna Filanovich
- Маргари́та Ива́новна Филано́вич
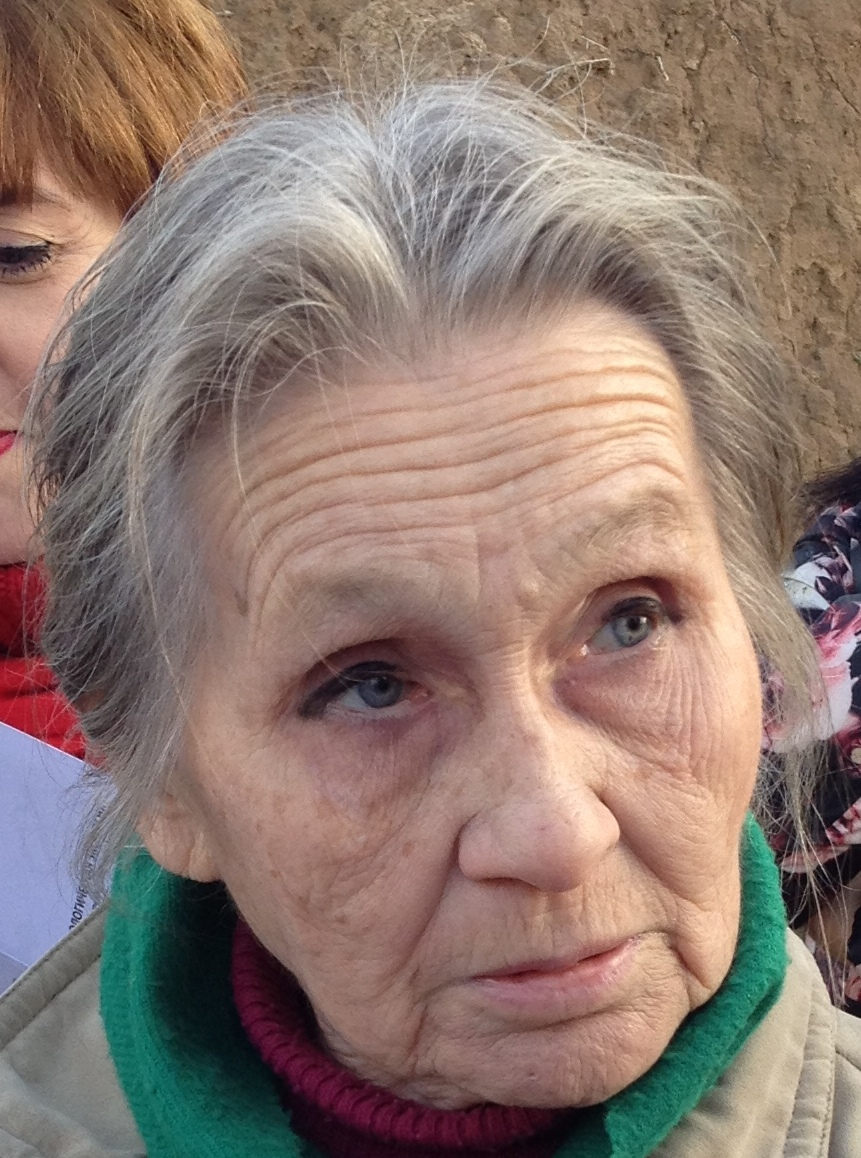
- Filanovich in 2015
- Born: 16 June 1937 (age 89); Leningrad, Soviet Russia
- Occupations: Historian, archaeologist
- Known for: Leading a major archaeological expedition in Tashkent around the 1970s
- Awards: State Prize of the Uzbek SSR (1985)

Margarita Ivanovna Filanovich (born 16 June 1937 in Leningrad) is a Soviet (later Uzbek) historian, archaeologist, and leader of a Tashkent archaeological expedition (formerly the Tashkent archaeological detachment).

Filanovich's research interests include history, the archeology of ancient and medieval Central Asia, the historical topography of cities, and the study of religious cults of the corresponding era. She drew attention to the settlement of Shashtepa as a promising object for the study of ancient urban culture in Tashkent (the identified age of the archaeological settlement was taken as the age of the city, which served as the basis for its anniversary celebrations).

She is a laureate of the State Prize of the Uzbek SSR named after Biruni, in the field of science and technology (1985).

She is currently deputy editor of the journal Oʻzbekiston tarixi ("History of Uzbekistan").

== Biography ==
=== Early life ===
Margarita Ivanovna Filanovich was born in Leningrad (now Saint Petersburg) on 16 June 1937. Her father died on the front lines of the Great Patriotic War. She was in the city during the Blockade, and subsequently, her family was evacuated along the Road of Life. After escaping the siege, she lived in Siberia, then Belarus, and finally ended up in Tashkent, where she graduated from high school. During those years of study, she became interested in the history of the region.

=== Study and early career ===
Filanovich entered the Faculty of History of Central Asian State University, which at the time was the only department of archeology in Central Asia. The department was headed by Mikhail Masson, who became the young historian's supervisor. She graduated from the educational institution with honors in 1959 .

On the recommendation of her supervisor, Filanovich took up the study of the Gyaurkala settlement, which is part of the complex of ruins of the ancient Merv.

She worked at the Institute of History and Archeology (Tashkent), until 1970, when the Institute of Archeology was established in the city of Samarkand, and she relocated there. From 1973, she was the institution's scientific secretary for 15 years.

She entered graduate school and specialized in the materials of the excavations in 1974, defending her thesis titled Ancient Merv in the light of the study of the stratigraphy of the ancient city of Gyaurkala for the degree of Candidate of Historical Sciences .

=== Tashkent archaeology and present work ===
In 1967, following a massive earthquake (1966) and the subsequent restoration of Tashkent, a Tashkent archaeological detachment was created for archaeological monitoring of urban new buildings. Filanovich joined the squad, and after the retirement of her leader V. A. Bulatova in 1975 (according to other sources in 1974) she leads it. The research team covered almost all archaeological sites in Tashkent. In 1979, the detachment was reorganised into a constantly working Tashkent archaeological expedition. She was also engaged in research of other ancient settlements of Uzbekistan (Kanka, Afrasiab).

In October 1985, a group of archaeologists investigating the problem of “The origins and development of the urbanisation of Central Asia based on archaeological research in Uzbekistan”, including Filanovich, was awarded the Beruni Uzbek SSR State Prize in the field of science and technology.

Currently, she holds the positions of lead researcher at the Institute of Archeology of the Academy of Sciences of the Republic of Uzbekistan and senior researcher at the Institute of History at the National University of Uzbekistan named after Mirzo Ulugbek.

== Scientific work ==
Filanovich's scientific interests cover the history and archeology of ancient and medieval Central Asia, the historical topography of its cities and the study of religious cults of the corresponding era.

By 2012, Filanovich had authored to over 200 publications, including about 20 monographs. In addition, she repeatedly played a role as a scientific editor and reviewer. Filanovich is the deputy editor of the journal O'zbekiston tarixi ("History of Uzbekistan") and a member of the coordinating council for dissertations at the Higher Attestation Commission. She was one of the authors and member of the editorial board of the 1st (1983) and 3rd (2009) editions of the Tashkent encyclopedia.

She has participated in numerous international conferences and symposia, at the invitation of a lecturer at the Ecole Normale Supérieure (the École normale supérieure) in Paris.

=== Research ===
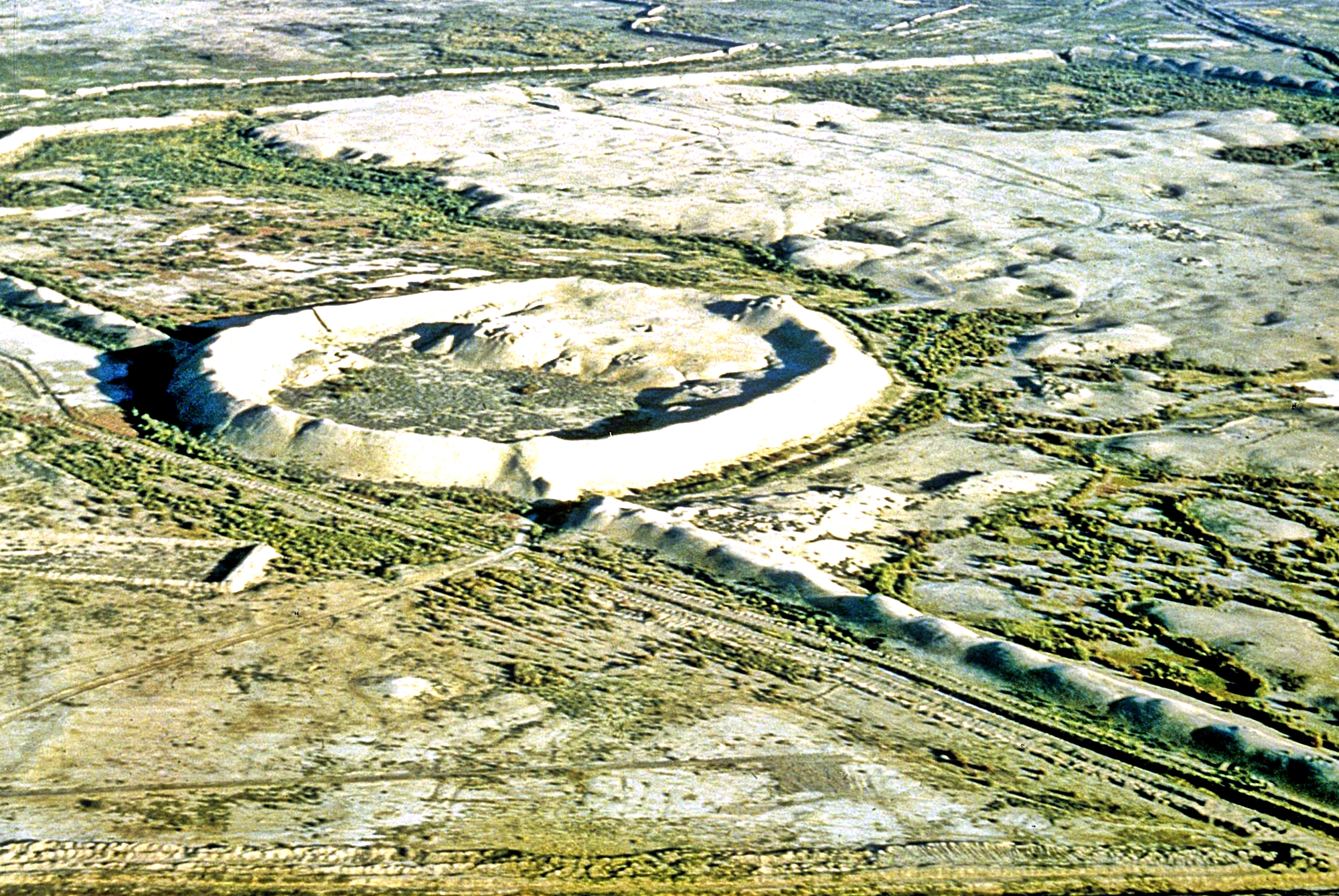
Aerial view of the ruins of ancient Merv

Filanovich studied the stages of formation and development of the urban core of the ancient Merv, the epochs of the rise and decline of the historical settlement were revealed.

Through her efforts as a participant and, subsequently, leader of the Tashkent archaeological expedition, it was possible to collect a large amount of historical, cultural and topographic information on the conditions of active development of urban territory affecting cultural layers. Almost all archaeological settlements located here were examined. The scientific team published the monographs “Ancient Tashkent ” (1973) and “Antiquities of Tashkent” (1976).

In the course of time, a reorganised detachment included Stone and Bronze Ages experts and the question was raised about the age of urban culture. Filanovich drew attention to Shashtepa as a promising object for the study of its most ancient stages. In 1982, the collective work “At the Sources of the Ancient Culture of Tashkent ” was published, and in 1983, a monograph of her personal authorship “Tashkent. The origin and development of the city and urban culture". In the same year, the celebration of the 2000th anniversary of the republican capital was held under the auspices of UNESCO, which gave rise to other studies on the dating of ancient cities in Uzbekistan.

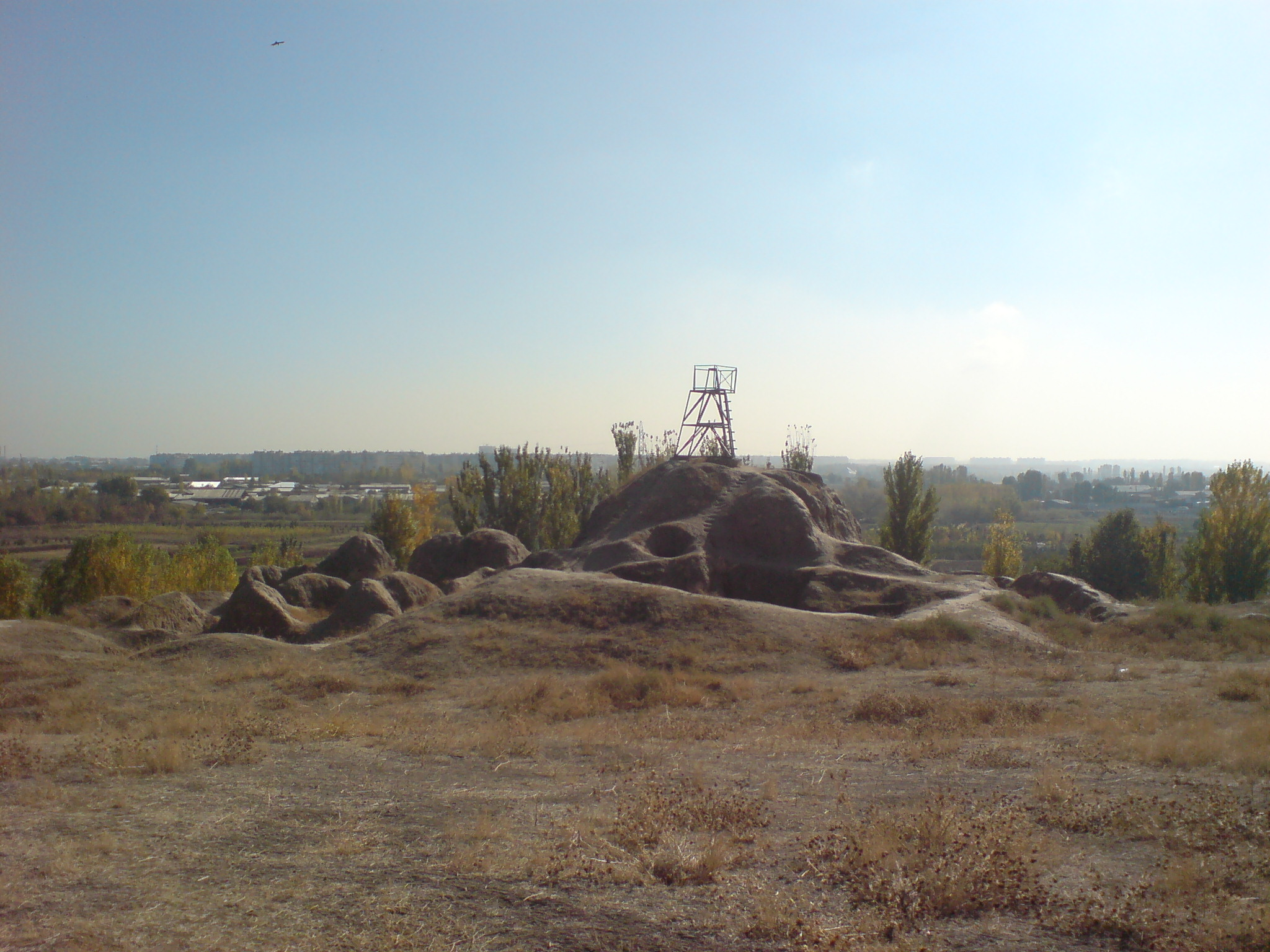
General view of the Shashtepa citadel

Filanovich organised the Tashkent archaeological base with a museum and a library, which became the foundation for the later created Tashkent department of the Institute of Archeology of the Academy of Sciences of Uzbekistan.

The accumulation of archaeological material allowed Filanovich to formulate a number of ideas about the history of the design of the Tashkent oasis, which received scientific recognition in Uzbekistan and beyond. In continuation of her research, the beginning of urban culture in Tashkent territory was wooded for two centuries. Updated scientific ideas were reflected in the monograph “Ancient and medieval history of Tashkent in archaeological sources ” (2010). Based on a complex of archaeological materials that allow dating the age of the most ancient urban culture on Shashtepa, and taking into account the study of the ancient settlement of Minguryuk, the festivities of the 2200th anniversary of the capital were held in 2009. The decision on the celebration was made at the 34th session of the General Conference of UNESCO and approved by the President of Uzbekistan, I. A. Karimov .

== Other activities ==
Filanovich continues to collaborate with the Department of Archeology, Faculty of History of the National University (currently the archaeological direction is represented at the faculty as part of a single department with ethnology), the Tashkent Islamic University and the Republican Center for the Preparation of Guides for Foreign Tourists.

Alongside her scientific publications, Filanovich has a number of popular scientific works, articles and interviews for newspapers to her name, and author's cycles of television and radio programs for a wide audience. In addition, she has served as a consultant to the film industry.

Filanovich has been actively involved in sports; while studying at the university, she was fond of equestrian sports – for which she occupied the top category – and table tennis. Floriculture is also one of her hobbies.

== Awards ==
For her scientific and social activities, Filanovich was awarded a number of Uzbek and foreign awards

- State Prize of the Uzbek SSR named after Beruni in the field of science and technology (1985)
- Order of Dustlik
- Medal "Shuhrat"
- Order of the Academic Palms (France)
- "Resident of the besieged Leningrad" (Leningrad City Executive Committee).

== Monographs ==
- Filanovich M.I. Tashkent. The origin and development of the city and urban culture. - Tashkent: Fan Publishing House of the Uzbek SSR, 1983. - 232 p. - 1000 copies.
- Mukminova R. G., Filanovich M. I. Tashkent at the crossroads of history (essays on the ancient and medieval history of the city) / Ed. ed. D. and. n D.A. Alimova . - Tashkent: “Fan”, 2001. - 116 p. - 1000 copies. - ISBN 5-648-02794-X.
- Filanovich M. I. Ancient medieval history of Tashkent in archaeological sources / Otv. ed. E.V. Rtveladze . - Tashkent: “Fan”, 2010. - 312 p. - 1000 copies. - ISBN 978-9943-01-503-6.
- Alimova D.A., Filanovich M.I. Toshkent Tarihi (қadim davlardan Bugungi Kungach). The history of Tashkent (from ancient times to the present day). - Toshkent: “ART FLEKS”, 2009. - 192 p. - 5,000 copies. - ISBN 978-9943-301-08-5.

=== Collective (co-author) ===
- Ancient Tashkent / Resp. ed. Cand. the story. Sciences I. Akhrarov . - Tashkent: Fan Publishing House of the Uzbek SSR, 1973. - 144 p. - 1,500 copies
- Antiquities of Tashkent / Resp. ed. Acad. Uzbek Academy of Sciences Ya. G. Gulyamov . - Tashkent: Fan Publishing House of the Uzbek SSR, 1976. - 132 p. - 1200 copies.
- At the origins of the ancient culture of Tashkent / Otv. ed. Cand. the story. Sciences Shishkin GV . - Tashkent: Fan Publishing House of the Uzbek SSR, 1982. - 132 p. - 1000 copies.

== Notes ==
1. Currently - Mirzo Ulugbek National University of Uzbekistan
2. ↑ Currently - Institute of History at the National University of Uzbekistan named after Mirzo Ulugbek

== Sources ==
- Gritsina A. A. On the 75th anniversary of Margarita Ivanovna Filanovich // Oʻzbekiston arxeologiyasi - Archeology of Uzbekistan. - 2012. - No. 2 (5) . - S. 121—124 . - ISSN 2181-032X.
