= Margarita Ganeva =

Bulgarian ambassador

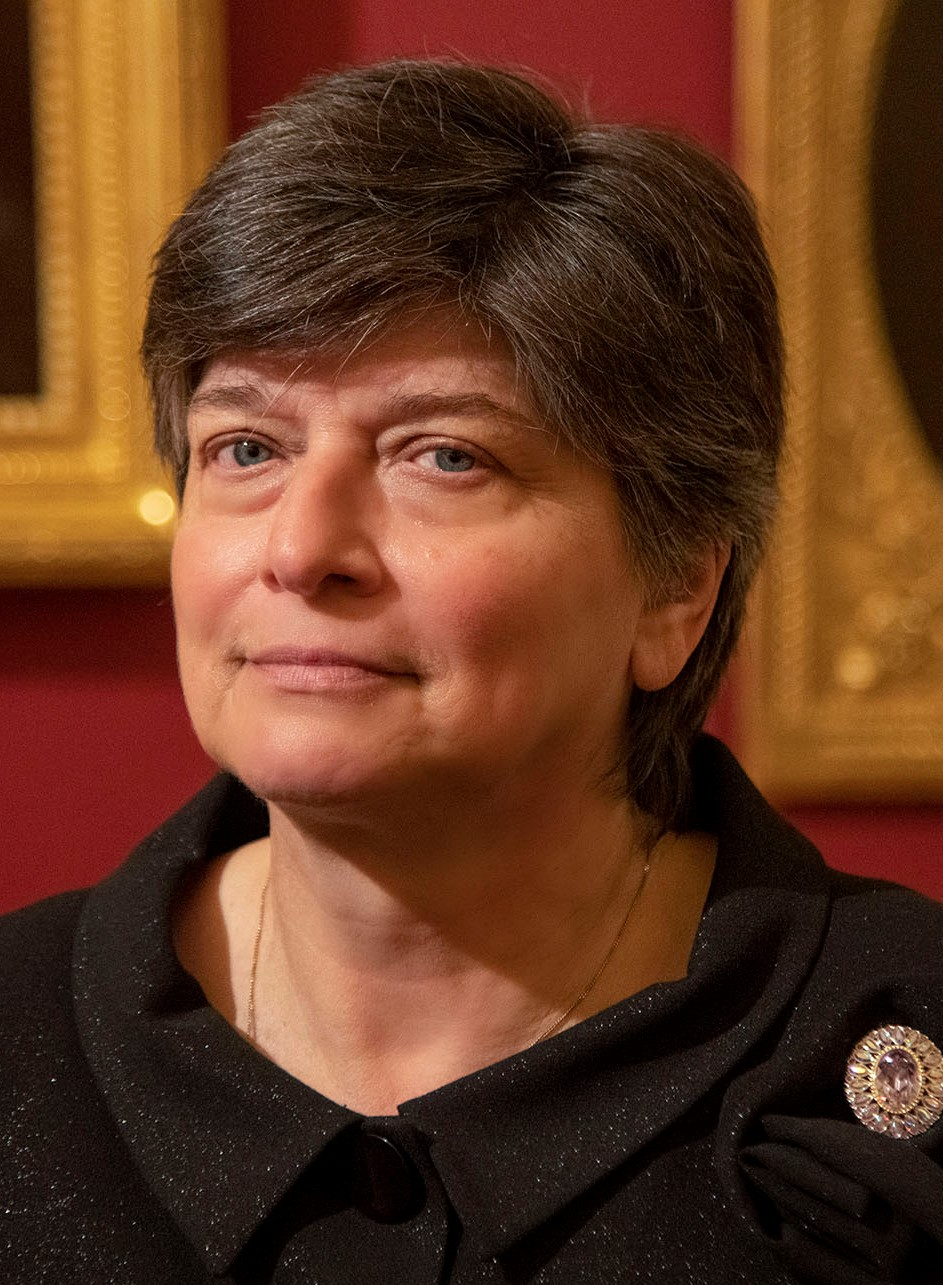

Margarita Ganeva (born 1959, in Sofia) was the Bulgarian Ambassador to Slovakia. She presented her credentials to Deputy Prime Minister and Minister of Foreign Affairs of the Slovak Republic Miroslav Lajčák on April 25, 2012.

Ganeva graduated with a degree in economics from the Economic University in Prague.
