= Margarita Arboix =

Spanish academic

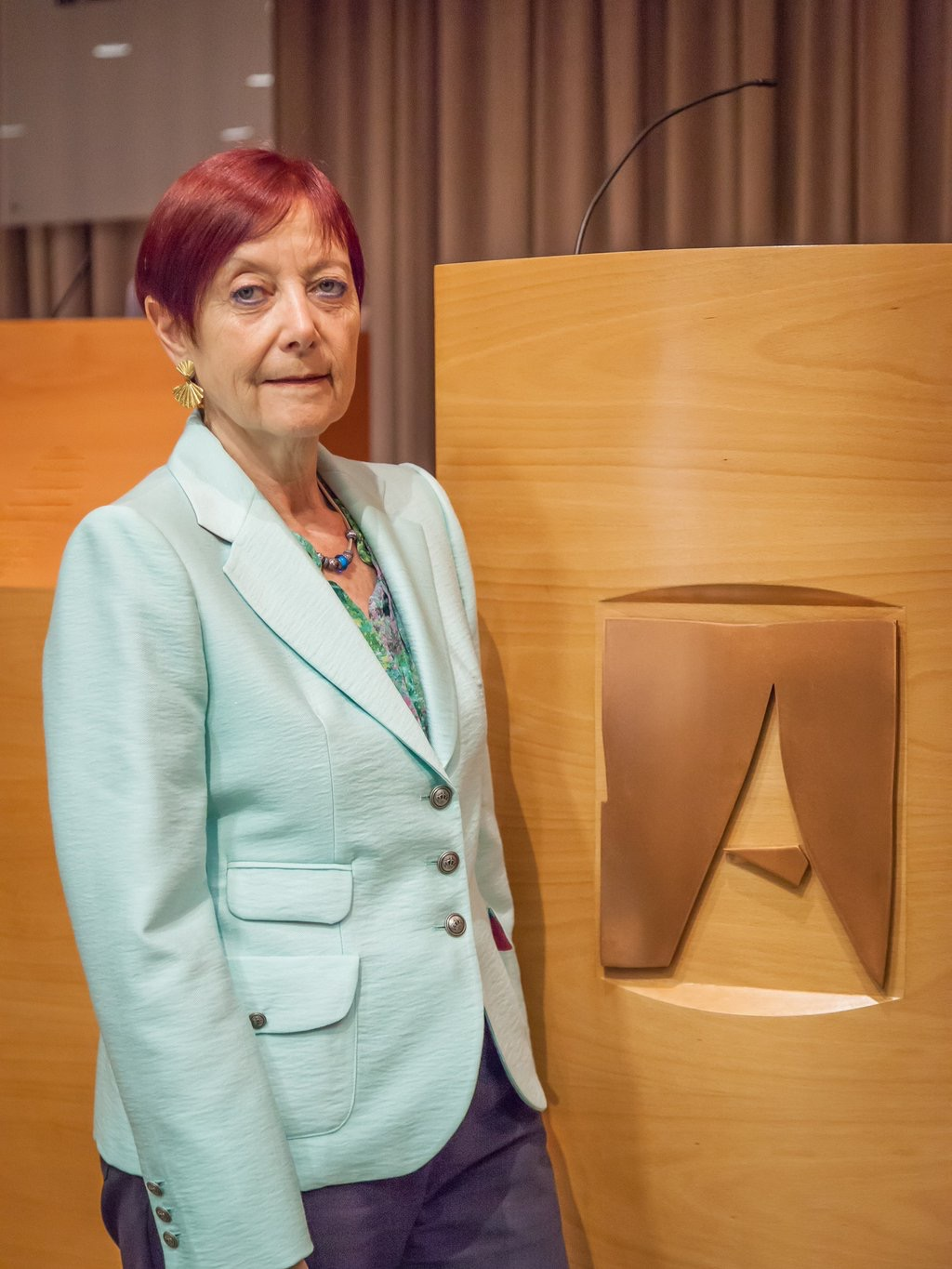

former 14th Rector of the Autonomous University of Barcelona
- In office 6 June 2016 – 28 October 2020
- Preceded by: Ferran Sancho Pifarré
- Succeeded by: Javier Lafuente Sancho

Personal details
- Born: 1950 (age 75–76) Ribesalbes, Spain
- Occupation: Academic

Margarita Arboix Arzo (born 1950 in Ribesalbes, Spain) is the former Rector of the Autonomous University of Barcelona. She obtained a Bachelor's degree and later a doctorate in biology by the same university. In 1976 she was employed in the pharmacology department of the Faculty of Medicine, and transferred to a teaching position in the Faculty of Veterinary Sciences nine years later.

She has performed research in the field of pharmacology, becoming a professor in 1993. She codirected the Consolidated Research Group for Clinical and Therapeutic Parasitology (Grup de Recerca Consolidat de Parasitologia Clínica i Terapèutica), and has authored over 100 journal articles.

She also participated in over 40 research projects, both privately and publicly financed. In October 2000 she became general subdirector of veterinary medications at the Spanish Agency of Medicines and Medical Devices (Agència Espanyola de Medicaments i Productes Sanitaris). In 2005 she became director of the Direcció dels Serveis Territorials de Salut a Barcelona. She returned to Madrid in 2010 to become director general of Recursos Agrícoles i Ramaders within the Ministry of the Environment, finally being employed at the UAB in 2012. Arboix Arzo became Rector in 2016 after obtaining slightly more than 60% of the vote count.
