= Margarita Dubocovich =

Argentine pharmacologist

Margarita L. Dubocovich, Ph.D., FACNP, FASPET is an Argentine neuropharmacologist currently a SUNY Distinguished Professor at University of Buffalo, State University of New York. She is best known for her groundbreaking research on the regulation of circadian rhythms and the role of melatonin receptors in the brain.

Dubocovich was born in Venado Tuerto, Santa Fe, Argentina, and received her Ph.D. in Pharmacology from the University of Buenos Aires in 1976.

In 1985, Dubocovich joined the faculty at SUNY Buffalo, where she established her own research program and became a leader in the field of melatonin receptor pharmacology. She discovered the first high-affinity melatonin receptor, which led to the development of selective melatonin agonists and antagonists that have been used to study the physiological and therapeutic effects of melatonin.

Dubocovich has received numerous awards and honors for her contributions to the field of neuropharmacology, including the prestigious Julius Axelrod Award from the American Society for Pharmacology and Therapeutics in 2022. She is also a Fellow of the American Society for Pharmacology and Therapeutics.

Dubocovich continues to conduct cutting-edge research on the role of melatonin receptors in circadian rhythms, sleep, and mood disorders, and her work has important implications for the development of novel treatments for these conditions.

Dubocovich has several patents in her name, many of which are related to her research on melatonin receptors and their potential therapeutic applications. Some of her notable patents include:

1. US Patent 4,770,999 - "Method for determining the affinity of ligands for a melatonin receptor"
2. US Patent 5,468,856 - "Melatonin receptor antagonists and agonists"
3. US Patent 5,712,310 - "Melatonin receptor ligands with improved oral bioavailability"
4. US Patent 7,824,662 - "Melatonin analogs with improved receptor subtype selectivity"

These patents demonstrate Dubocovich's innovative contributions to the field of neuropharmacology and her commitment to developing new therapies for sleep and mood disorders.

Dubocovich has made several significant discoveries and contributions to the field of neuropharmacology, particularly in the area of melatonin receptors. Here are a few of her notable inventions/discoveries:

1. Discovered the first high-affinity melatonin receptor: In the 1980s, Dr. Dubocovich discovered the first high-affinity melatonin receptor in the brain, which led to the development of selective melatonin agonists and antagonists. This discovery enabled the study of the physiological and therapeutic effects of melatonin.
2. Developed selective melatonin receptor agonists and antagonists: Dubocovich's research led to the development of selective melatonin receptor agonists and antagonists that have been used to study the physiological and therapeutic effects of melatonin. These compounds have also been used to develop novel therapies for sleep and mood disorders.
3. Discovered the role of melatonin receptors in circadian rhythms: Dubocovich's research demonstrated the critical role of melatonin receptors in regulating circadian rhythms, particularly the MT1 and MT2 receptors. This discovery has led to a better understanding of the mechanisms underlying sleep and wakefulness and has informed the development of new treatments for sleep disorders.
4. Identified novel pathways for melatonin signaling: Dubocovich's research has identified novel signaling pathways for melatonin, including the phosphoinositide-3-kinase (PI3K) pathway, which has implications for the development of novel therapies for mood disorders.

Overall, Dubocovich's research significantly advanced the understanding of melatonin receptor pharmacology. It has helped towards the development of treatment for sleep and mood disorders.
