= Margarita Sikaffi =

Honduran politician

Margarita Dabdoub Sikaffi is a Honduran politician. She is commonly known as "Margie Dip". She was the first female mayor of La Ceiba. She served as mayor of La Ceiba 1994–1998.

Prior to entering electoral politics, Sikaffi worked as spokesperson for the Standard Fruit Company. She was named as governor of the Atlantida department by president Manuel Zelaya. Following the 2009 Honduran coup d'etat, that ousted Zelaya, Sikaffi said she had not been a "cuartista" (i.e., a supporter of the referendum on constitutional reform) but opposed the coup.

Sikaffi was elected to the National Congress of Honduras in the 2009 general election as a Liberal candidate in Atlantida. With 30,234 votes (30.7% of the valid votes), she was the most voted Liberal candidate in the constituency. In the Liberal Party primaries (held in 2008), she had finished in second place in Atlantida with 12,603 votes (6.94%). She was a candidate of the Elvinist Liberal Movement (the platform of presidential candidate Elvin Santos).

In May 2013, Sikaffi declared her intent to contest the La Ceiba mayoral post once again, in the primaries of the Libre party. Dabdoub was nominated as the candidate of the June 28 Movement of Liberals in Resistance (one of the internal currents of Libre). Sikaffi emerged victorious, obtaining 5,364 votes (56.43%), becoming the mayoral candidate of Libre in La Ceiba in the 2013 general election.

Sikaffi is the president of a charity named after her, Fundación Margie.

== Bibliography ==
- Rubio, Anselmo. Margie Dip: biografía de una ceibeña que se convertió en la primera mujer alcaldesa de Ceibita la bella. Honduras: s.n, 1997.
