= Margarita Alcantara =

American writer and publisher

Sabrina Margarita Alcantara-Tan (born June 10, 1970) is an American writer and the creator of the now inactive print zine series Bamboo Girl.

== Early life ==
Alcantara was born in Pennsylvania.

== Bamboo Girl ==
Bamboo Girl was an independent print zine which circulated in the US from 1995 to 2005. It highlighted content that commented on homophobia, racism and sexism. Alcantara notably featured Filipina authors Ninotchka Rosca, Jessica Hagedorn, and Perla Daly in the series.

== Personal life ==
Alcantara is an Asian-American queer woman. She now lives in New York City.

Alcantara is a licensed acupuncturist who received her Masters of Science in Acupuncture at the Pacific College of Health and Science. She has an active acupuncture practice in New York.
