= Margarita Behrens =

Neuroscientist and biochemist

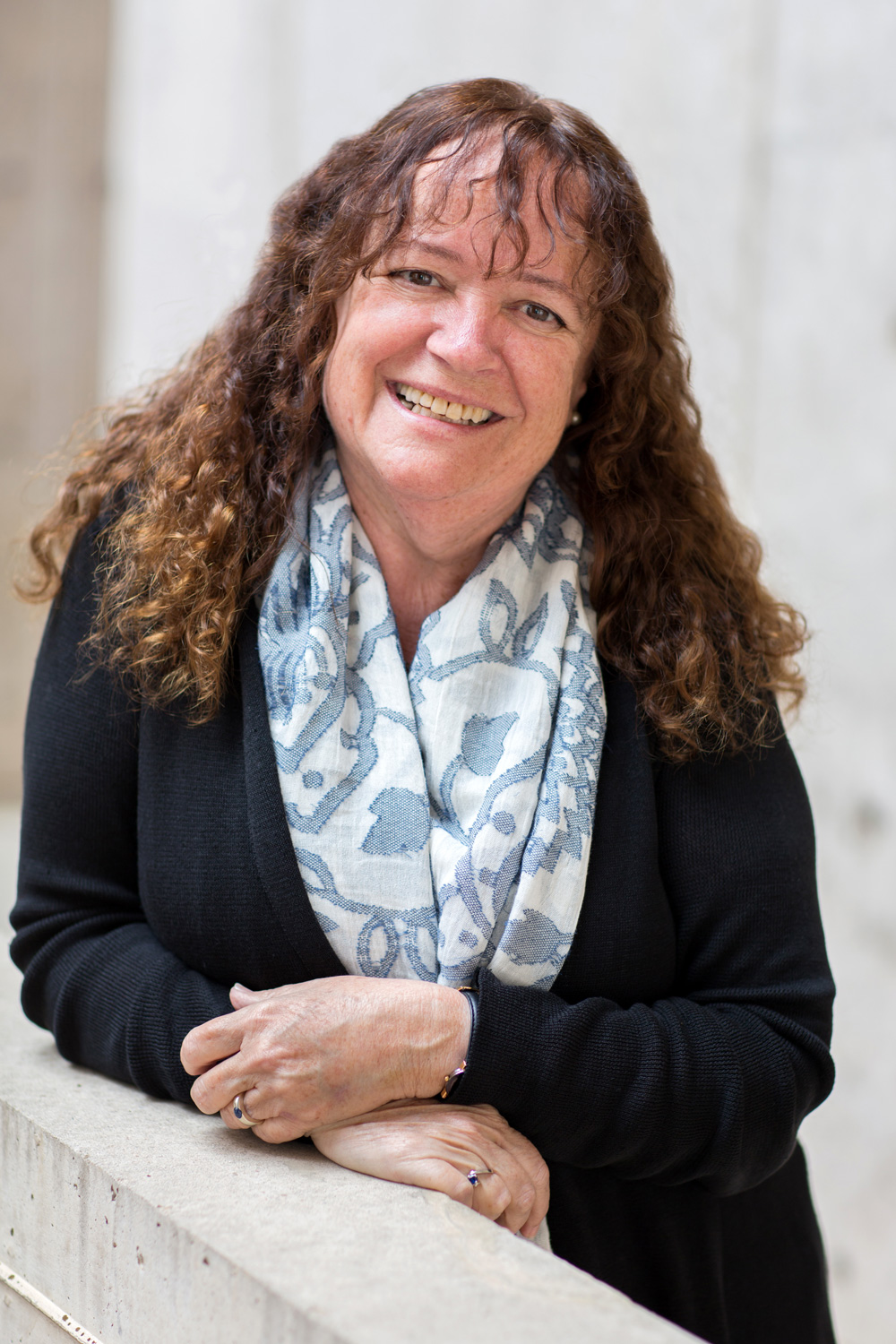
- Education: Universidad de Chile in Santiago, Universidad Autonoma in Madrid, Washington University School of Medicine in St. Louis
- Known for: Gene-environment interactions in CNS development
- Awards: NIH Brain Initiative, NARSAD Young Investigator, Daniel X. Freedman Award
- Scientific career
- Fields: Neuroscience, biochemistry
- Workplaces: Salk Institute for Biological Studies

Margarita Behrens is a neuroscientist and biochemist. She is currently an associate professor at the Salk Institute for Biological Studies where her lab studies the impact of oxidative stress on the post-natal brain through probing the biology of fast-spiking parvalbumin interneurons in models of schizophrenia.

== Early life and education ==
Behrens completed her master's degree at the University of Chile in biochemistry and then continued to the Autonoma University in Madrid to conduct a PhD in molecular biology and biochemistry. Behrens then completed her post-doctoral work at Washington University in St. Louis. In 2009, Behrens began working as a staff scientist as the Salk Institute where she led a group of researchers within Terry Sejnowski's computational neuroscience laboratory studying the circuitry implicated in schizophrenia in rodent models.

== Career and research ==
In 2018, the Salk Institute appointed Behrens as Research Professor, where she remains the first and only faculty member to hold this title. Her lab currently explores how environmental influences shape prefrontal cortical circuit development as a means to understand why some individuals might progress towards psychiatric illness while others do not. In an effort to dissect prefrontal cortical neurons in development, Behrens' lab uncovers novel subtypes of neurons through probing their unique DNA methylation patterns. Using single-nucleus sequencing technologies, Behrens has helped produce a novel dataset mapping the methylomes of both rodent and human prefrontal cortical neurons. This work has increased our knowledge of the diversity of cell types which provides an important platform for other neuroscientists to ask deeper questions about neural development in both health and disease. Behrens is now using the methylome dataset to ask translational question about how maternal environment may impact methylation in certain subtypes of neurons and how this may give rise to disease.

== Selected publications ==
- Lavery, Laura A.; Ure, Kerstin; Wan, Ying-Wooi; Luo, Chongyuan; Trostle, Alexander J.; Wang, Wei; Jin, Haijing; Lopez, Joanna; Lucero, Jacinta; Durham, Mark A.; Castanon, Rosa; Nery, Joseph R.; Liu, Zhandong; Goodell, Margaret; Ecker, Joseph R.; Behrens, M Margarita; Zoghbi, Huda Y. (2020). "Losing Dnmt3a dependent methylation in inhibitory neurons impairs neural function by a mechanism impacting Rett syndrome". eLife. 9. doi:10.7554/eLife.52981. PMC 7065908. PMID 32159514.
- Zhu, Chenxu; Yu, Miao; Huang, Hui; Juric, Ivan; Abnousi, Armen; Hu, Rong; Lucero, Jacinta; Behrens, M. Margarita; Hu, Ming; Ren, Bing (2019). "An ultra high-throughput method for single-cell joint analysis of open chromatin and transcriptome". Nature Structural & Molecular Biology. 26 (11): 1063–1070. doi:10.1038/s41594-019-0323-x. PMC 7231560. PMID 31695190.
- Amodeo, Dionisio A.; Lai, Chi-Yu; Hassan, Omron; Mukamel, Eran A.; Behrens, M. Margarita; Powell, Susan B. (2019). "Maternal immune activation impairs cognitive flexibility and alters transcription in frontal cortex". Neurobiology of Disease. 125: 211–218. doi:10.1016/j.nbd.2019.01.025. PMC 6474674. PMID 30716470.
- Luo, Chongyuan; Rivkin, Angeline; Zhou, Jingtian; Sandoval, Justin P.; Kurihara, Laurie; Lucero, Jacinta; Castanon, Rosa; Nery, Joseph R.; Pinto-Duarte, António; Bui, Brian; Fitzpatrick, Conor; o'Connor, Carolyn; Ruga, Seth; Van Eden, Marc E.; Davis, David A.; Mash, Deborah C.; Behrens, M. Margarita; Ecker, Joseph R. (2018). "Robust single-cell DNA methylome profiling with SNMC-seq2". Nature Communications. 9 (1): 3824. Bibcode:2018NatCo...9.3824L. doi:10.1038/s41467-018-06355-2. PMC 6147798. PMID 30237449.
- Luo, Chongyuan; Keown, Christopher L.; Kurihara, Laurie; Zhou, Jingtian; He, Yupeng; Li, Junhao; Castanon, Rosa; Lucero, Jacinta; Nery, Joseph R.; Sandoval, Justin P.; Bui, Brian; Sejnowski, Terrence J.; Harkins, Timothy T.; Mukamel, Eran A.; Behrens, M. Margarita; Ecker, Joseph R. (2017). "Single-cell methylomes identify neuronal subtypes and regulatory elements in mammalian cortex". Science. 357 (6351): 600–604. Bibcode:2017Sci...357..600L. doi:10.1126/science.aan3351. PMC 5570439. PMID 28798132.
- Khan, Asma; De Jong, Loek A.W.; Kamenski, Mary E.; Higa, Kerin K.; Lucero, Jacinta D.; Young, Jared W.; Behrens, M. Margarita; Powell, Susan B. (2017). "Adolescent GBR12909 exposure induces oxidative stress, disrupts parvalbumin-positive interneurons, and leads to hyperactivity and impulsivity in adult mice". Neuroscience. 345: 166–175. doi:10.1016/j.neuroscience.2016.11.022. PMC 5316310. PMID 27890827.
- Jadi, Monika P.; Behrens, M. Margarita; Sejnowski, Terrence J. (2016). "Abnormal Gamma Oscillations in N-Methyl-D-Aspartate Receptor Hypofunction Models of Schizophrenia". Biological Psychiatry. 79 (9): 716–726. doi:10.1016/j.biopsych.2015.07.005. PMC 4720598. PMID 26281716.
- Wang, Xin; Pinto-Duarte, António; Behrens, M. Margarita; Zhou, Xianjin; Sejnowski, Terrence J. (2015). "Characterization of spatio-temporal epidural event-related potentials for mouse models of psychiatric disorders". Scientific Reports. 5 14964. Bibcode:2015NatSR...514964W. doi:10.1038/srep14964. PMC 4602219. PMID 26459883.
- Barnes, S. A.; Pinto-Duarte, A.; Kappe, A.; Zembrzycki, A.; Metzler, A.; Mukamel, E. A.; Lucero, J.; Wang, X.; Sejnowski, T. J.; Markou, A.; Behrens, M. M. (2015). "Disruption of mGluR5 in parvalbumin-positive interneurons induces core features of neurodevelopmental disorders". Molecular Psychiatry. 20 (10): 1161–1172. doi:10.1038/mp.2015.113. PMC 4583365. PMID 26260494.
- Powell, Susan B.; Khan, Asma; Young, Jared W.; Scott, Christine N.; Buell, Mahalah R.; Caldwell, Sorana; Tsan, Elisa; De Jong, Loek A.W.; Acheson, Dean T.; Lucero, Jacinta; Geyer, Mark A.; Behrens, M. Margarita (2015). "Early Adolescent Emergence of Reversal Learning Impairments in Isolation-Reared Rats". Developmental Neuroscience. 37 (3): 253–262. doi:10.1159/000430091. PMC 4644772. PMID 26022788.

== Selected awards ==
- 2019 NIH Brain Initiative Award
- 2019 Chan Zuckerberg Initiative to Expand Human Cell Atlas
- FEBS predoctoral Fellowship
- Cold Spring Harbor Laboratory Fellowship
- EMBO fellowship
- NARSAD Young Investigator Award
- Daniel X. Freedman Award
