= Margarita Miniati =

Greek scholar and writer

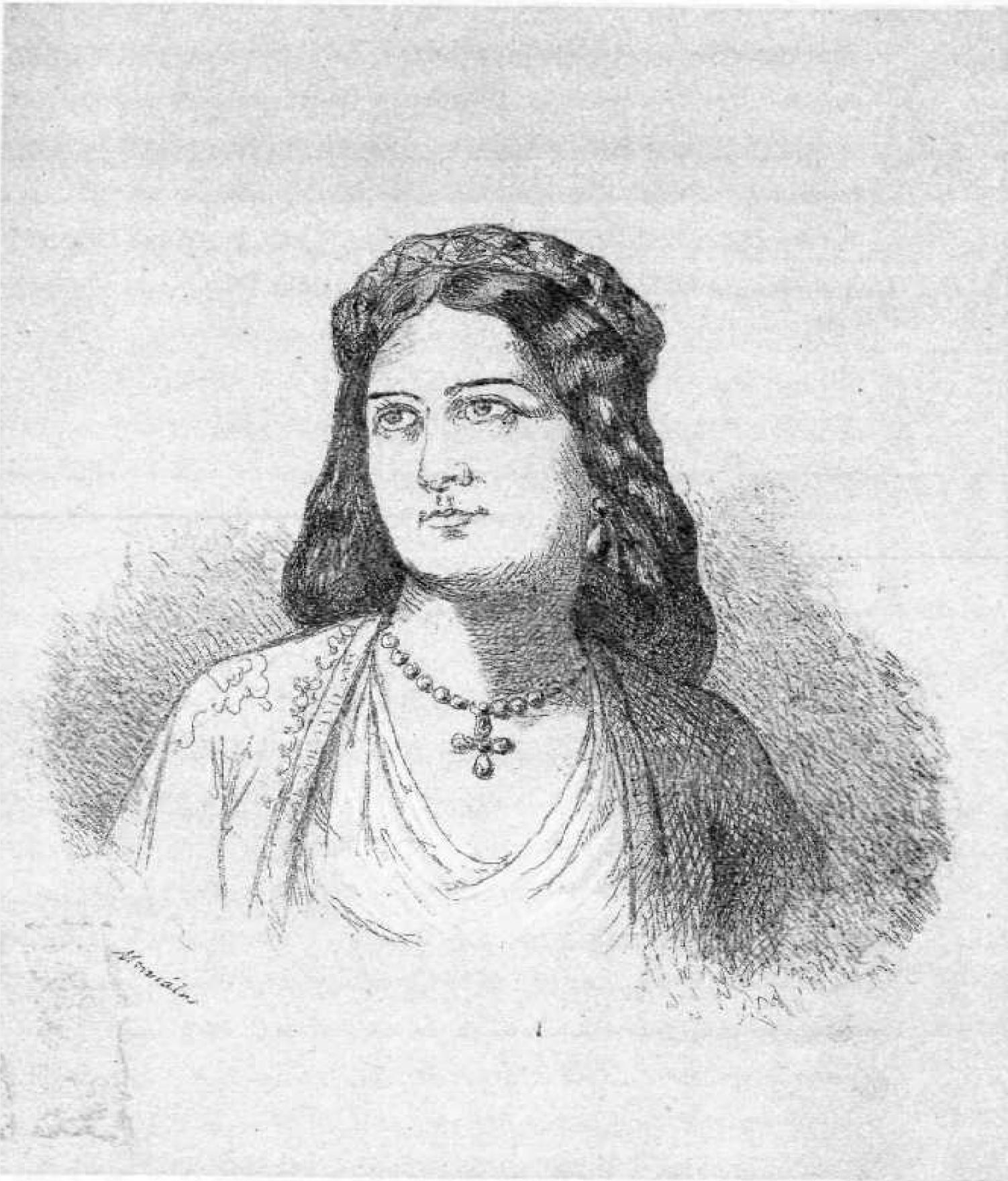
- Born: 1821; Corfu, United States of the Ionian Islands
- Died: 1887 (aged 65–66); Livorno, Italy
- Resting place: Florence, Italy
- Occupations: Author scholar
- Notable work: Dante and His Time; Correggio, his life and his work
- Spouse: Georgios Miniatis

Margarita Mathilda Miniati (Greek: Μαργαρίτα Ματθίλδη Μηνιάτη, 1821–1887) was a Greek scholar and writer who flourished in Italy during the 19th century.

== Biographical information ==
She was born in Corfu in 1821 and she was the daughter of Dimitrios Alvanas and Aikaterini Palatianou. She had four more brothers and sisters, Leonidas, Friderikos, Nina and Sada. Being still a minor, she was adopted by her mother's sister and her husband, major general Sir Frederick Adam, who at that time served as commissioner of the British Empire in the Ionian Islands. After receiving a primary education in her home country, she followed her foster family in India where Adam had been transferred. Later, she went to Rome where she met the Greek painter Georgios Miniatis, with whom she got married in 1844. She made several trips to Europe until 1846, when she settled with her husband in Florence. There, she joined the artistic and intellectual circles of the city and she had intensified her work on letters, achieving to gain the admiration of many famous personalities of that time.

She died in 1887 in Livorno. Her body was moved to Florence where it was buried. From her marriage with Georgios Miniatis, she had two daughters, Eleni, who died in childhood, and Aspasia, who dealt with painting.

== Works ==
Margarita Miniati is recognized as a multilingual and erudite personality and one of the most important scholars of her time. From 1857 she began her collaboration with the newspaper Hemerisia Nea of London and from 1860 she began to cooperate with several Italian publications. She wrote numerous works in Italian, English and French . In 1865 she published in English her study about "Dante and his time." In the next years other works followed such as "Historical outlines of intellectual and artistic relations of Italy with the Byzantine Empire" (1869), "Correggio, his life and his work" (1881), etc.
