= Margarita Mayeta =

Cuban volleyball player

Personal information
- Full name: Margarita Mayeta Hierrezuelo
- Born: 30 March 1948 (age 78); Santiago de Cuba, Cuba
- Height: 1.67 m (5 ft 6 in)

Volleyball information
- Number: 5

National team
| 1970–1972 | Cuba |
Honours
Women's volleyball
Representing Cuba
Pan American Games
| Gold medal – first place | 1971 Cali | Team |
Central American and Caribbean Games
| Silver medal – second place | 1970 Panama City | Team |

Margarita Mayeta (born 30 March 1948) is a Cuban former volleyball player. She competed in the women's tournament at the 1972 Summer Olympics in Munich. Mayeta won a gold medal with the Cuban team at the 1971 Pan American Games in Cali.

== Baseball coaching ==
Since 2003, Mayeta has been in charge of developing women's baseball in Cuba. Since then, Cuba has emerged as among the top teams in women's baseball internationally.
