= Margarita Nazarova =

Margarita Nazarova may refer to:

- Margarita Nazarova (artist) (1926–2005), Russian performer
- Margarita Nazarova (racewalker) (born 1976), Russian race walker
