= Margarita Ortega =

Margarita Ortega may refer to:

- Margarita Ortega (actress) (Margarita Ortega Cadavid, born 1973), Colombian television presenter and actress
- Margarita Ortega (magonist) (Margarita Ortega Valdés, 1871–1913), Mexican anarchist revolutionary
- Margarita Ortega Villa (1951–1996), Mexican politician from Baja California
