= Margarita del Mazo =

Spanish writer (born 1960)

- Born: 17 October 1960 (age 65); Malpica de Tajo, Spain
- Education: Complutense University of Madrid
- Occupations: Writer, lawyer
- Awards: Lazarillo Award (2011); Gelett Burgess Children's Book Award (2016)
- Website: www.margaritadelmazo.com

Margarita del Mazo (born 17 October 1960) is a Spanish writer of children's literature.

== Biography ==
Margarita del Mazo earned a law degree from the Complutense University of Madrid. In the late 1990s, she began narrating live stories, and in 2009, she published her first book, La máscara del león.

She teaches storytelling, creative writing, reading animation, puppet and theater workshops, as well as teacher training courses in rural public schools and private centers (nursery schools and institutes).

She collaborates with the Instituto Cervantes on several of its festivals (Day E, Festival Ñ and Cervantino Day of Children's and Young Adult Literature), in different national and international venues, with presentations, workshops, author meetings and narration sessions. She also works with institutions such as the Museo Nacional Centro de Arte Reina Sofía, the Museo ABC, the Thyssen-Bornemisza Museum, the Community of Madrid, Castilla–La Mancha, the Centro Andaluz de las Letras, the Casa del Lector in Matadero, town halls, hospitals, festivals (BITA, Etnosur, Hay Festival, etc.), and narration marathons such as Guadalajara's and the Parla Cuenta Festival.

She has carried out several presentations at conferences and festivals of literature and illustration (IlustraTour, Hay Festival). In 2010, she participated in the International Congress of Art, Education, and Visual Culture in Early Childhood and Primary Education.

In 2017, she was invited to Chicago and other communities in Illinois, to participate in narration sessions and meetings with authors and teachers in bilingual centers and libraries.

== Works ==
=== Children's literature ===
- La máscara del León (2009, OQO)
- Mosquito (2010, Jaguar)
- ¡A mí no me comas! (2011, OQO)
- La boda de los ratones (2012, OQO)
- Hamelín (2012, La Fragatina)
- Camuñas (2012, OQO)
- Las gafas de ver (2013, La Fragatina)
- El rebaño (2014, La Fragatina)
- Feroz, el lobo (2014, OQO)
- Carlitos Super M (2014, La Fragatina)
- ¿Dónde están mis gafas? (2014, La Fragatina)
- La luz de Lucía (2015, Cuento de Luz)
- El pirata Malapata (2015, Jaguar)
- 5 PATITOS (2016, Jaguar)
- 1, 2, 3 ¡MÍO ES! (2016, Jaguar)
- Mi cara (2016, Jaguar)
- La visita (2016, Ed. Jaguar)
- El mejor de los caminos (2017, Edelvives)
- Don Romualdo (2017, Tres tristes tigres)
- Papá dice (2017, Jaguar)
- NO quiero ser rey (2017, Canicabooks)
- ¡Puff! (2017, Jaguar)
- El más fuerte (2018, Libros de las Malas Compañías)
- Dad (2024, Cuento de Luz)

=== Stories for adults ===
- Presentes (2018, Avenauta)

== Awards and recognitions ==
- 2010 Junceda Award finalist for Mosquito
- 2011 Lazarillo Illustrated Album Award for Hamelín
- Plaque BIB at the 2013 Bratislava Biennale for the illustrations in Hamelín
- 2014 Gremio de Libreros de Madrid Award for Best Illustrated Album for El Rebaño
- 2015 Plastilina & Bloggers Award for Best Illustrated Album for El Rebaño
- 2016 Cuatrogatos Foundation Award for El Rebaño
- 2018 Cuatrogatos Foundation Award for 5 PATITOS
- 2014 Isaac Díaz Pardo Award Finalist for Feroz, el lobo
- Honorable mention for the illustrations of Feroz, el lobo at the 2014 Sharjah Internacional Book Fair, United Arab Emirates
- 2016 Gelett Burgess Children's Book Award in the category Spanish Language Society and Culture for La luz de Lucía
- 2025 Bronze Medal for Best Children's English Fiction Book at the International Latino Book Awards
