= Margarita Brender Rubira =

Romanian architect

- Born: 4 July 1919; Craiova, Romania
- Died: 11 February 2000; Castellon, Spain
- Education: Barcelona School of Architecture
- Occupation: Architect
- Projects: El Prat de Llobregat

Margarita Brender Rubira (1919-2000) was a Romanian-born architect, the first woman architect in Catalonia.

== Life ==
Margarita Brender Rubira was born in 1919 in Romania, and studied architecture in Romania. When Barcelona's School of Architecture, the Escuela Técnica Superior de Arquitectura de Barcelona, endorsed her architectural degree in 1962, she became the first woman architect in Catalonia. She became the only woman member of the Architects' Association of Catalonia (the Colegio de Arquitectos de Cataluña or COAC) in 1962, and for many years was the only practicing woman architect in the Province of Barcelona.

In a 6 November 1962 interview to La Prensa (a Barcelona newspaper), she stated that "architects have a great responsibility for the influence that their works exert on people's lives, as it is up to you to make or not make houses that are real shelters, real resting places, that contribute to the nation's physical health and morale".

Beginning in 1966, Brender was one of a team of three architects working on a modern 346-apartment complex to replace a fabric factory in the Can Mercader region of Badalona. According to a review of the project in 2018, "Can Mercader is an example taken from the context of functionalist architecture, almost in a tropical style in which green breaks through the concrete."

Her solo designs were included in annual summaries published by the architecture journal Cuaderns in 1969 and 1970. The 1969 issue featured a page about an apartment block on the Costa Brava. According to the COAC, "The hand-drawn layout and perspective display a deft handling of modules that gives the whole complex an organic appearance, a direct legacy of the Can Mercader district." The 1970 issue included a page about Brender's design for luxury apartments in Prat de Llobregat.

According to an article about her published in 2017 by the Republican Youth of Catalonia (JERC),

She defended an avant-garde style of architecture, where the design of the spaces has a qualitative impact on improving the lives of the people who inhabit it. Throughout her career she gave great importance to the integration between architecture and nature. She believed that every room should be able to see the sky. She often regretted the limitations of urban policy that did not allow for the breadth of spaces such as she considered fair, timely, and necessary.

She died 11 February 2000.
