= Pilar González i Duarte =

Spanish chemist (born 1945)

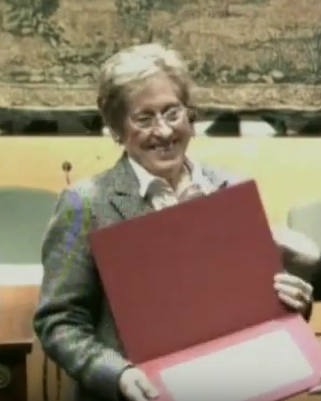
- Born: 26 January 1945 (age 81); Barcelona, Spain
- Education: Autonomous University of Barcelona
- Awards: Jaume Vicens i Vives award (2004)
- Scientific career
- Fields: Chemistry
- Workplaces: Autonomous University of Barcelona
- Doctoral advisor: Enric Casassas i Simó

Pilar González i Duarte (born 1945) is a Spanish chemist. She is a member of the Institute for Catalan Studies (IEC). In 2004, she was the recipient of the Jaume Vicens i Vives distinction awarded by the Government of Catalonia.

== Early life and education ==
Pilar González i Duarte was born in Barcelona in 1945. She studied chemistry at the University of Barcelona, where she graduated in 1967 with an Extraordinary Prize. She did a master's degree in chemistry at the University of Michigan, and a Ph.D. at the Autonomous University of Barcelona (UAB) with Enric Casassas i Simó, where she also obtained an Extraordinary Doctorate Award.

== Career and research ==
In 1990, González i Duarte became a professor at UAB, where she has held several senior positions. She focused her initial research on metal thiol compounds, using aliphatic mercaptans, with results that have been of interest for industrial processes of petroleum hydrodesulfurization and in the field of bioinorganics, a field in which she has also carried out several investigations. She has collaborated with the Pergamon publishing house in the U.K. and has been a lecturer. Between 1995 and 2002, she was president of the Societat Catalana de Química (Catalan Society of Chemistry), from where she promoted a new updated version of the Periodic table in Catalan. In 2000, she curated a traveling exhibition inaugurated at mNACTEC, with the title Tot és química (Everything is chemistry).

Inaugural session (2015–16) at the IEC

== Awards and honours ==
In 2004, González i Duarte, while a member of the Department of Chemistry at UAB, received the Jaume Vicens Vives distinction awarded by the Government of Catalonia for university teaching quality, in recognition of her career and dedication to the renovation and readaptation of chemistry teaching.

== Selected works ==
- 2005, Les Mil cares de la taula periòdica
