= Aldana =

Aldana may refer to:

== People ==
- Aldana (noblewoman), 8th-century Frank
- A family name:

- Adolfo Aldana (born 1966), Spanish retired footballer
- Andrea Aldana (born 1989), Guatemalan sports sailor
- Carlos Enrique Pena Aldana (born 1988), Guatemalan singer and songwriter
- David Aldana (born 1949), American former professional motorcycle racer
- Eduardo Fernández Aldana (born 1990), Mexican footballer
- Felipe Aldana (1922–1970), Argentine poet
- Fernando Martínez Aldana (born 1977), Mexican football manager and former player
- Fernando Schwalb López Aldana (1916–2002), Peruvian politician
- Irene Aldana (born 1988), Mexican mixed martial artist
- Jose Manuel Gomez Vazquez Aldana (born 1937), Mexican architect
- Lucia Aldana (born 1992), Colombian model
- Luis Artemio Aldana Burgos (born 1962), Mexican politician
- Luis Ricardo Aldana (born 1954), Mexican politician
- Maria Aldana Cetra (born 1980), Argentine racing cyclist
- Melissa Aldana (born 1988), Chilean tenor saxophone player
- Roberto Moreira Aldana (born 1987), Paraguayan footballer
- Thelma Aldana (born 1955), Guatemalan judge
- Víctor Aldana (born 1981), Spanish footballer

== Places ==
- Aldana (municipality), a town and municipality in the Nariño Department, Colombia
- Aldana, quarter of the town of Amorebieta-Etxano

== Other ==
- 44103 Aldana, asteroid

== See also ==
- Auldana
