= LVIII Legislature of the Mexican Congress =

58th Congress (LVIII Legislatura)
←	57th	59th	→
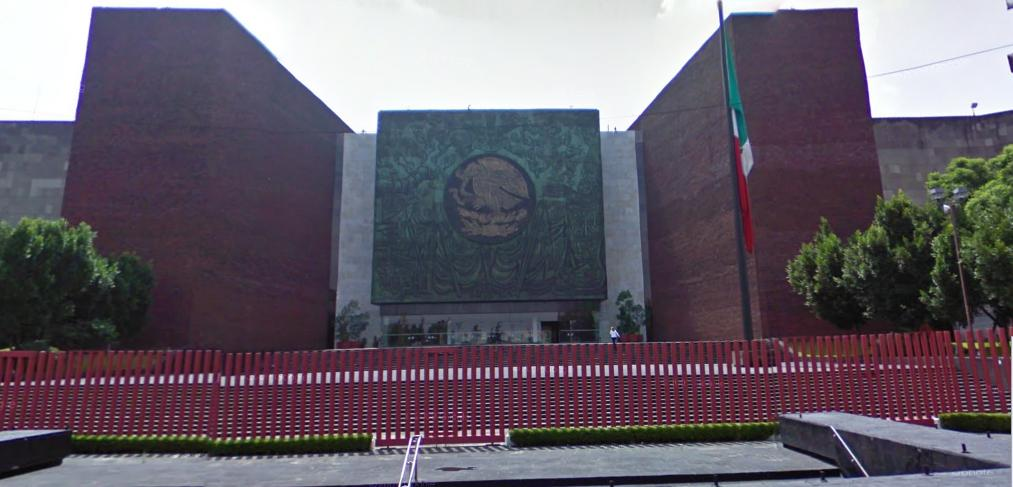
- Legislative Palace of San Lázaro

Overview
- Legislative body: Congress of the Union
- Meeting place: Legislative Palace of San Lázaro (Deputies/General Congress); Casona de Xicoténcatl (Senators)
- Term: 1 September 2000 – 31 August 2003
- Election: 2 July 2000

Senate of the Republic
- Members: 128

Chamber of Deputies
- Members: 500

Sessions
- 1st: 1 September 2000 – 29 December 2000
- 2nd: 15 March 2001 – 30 April 2001
- 3rd: 1 September 2001 – 15 December 2001
- 4th: 15 March 2002 – 30 April 2002
- 5th: 1 September 2002 – 15 December 2000
- 6th: 15 March 2003 – 30 April 2003

Special sessions
- 1st: 20 December 2001 – 29 December 2001

The LVIII Legislature of the Congress of the Union of Mexico (58th Congress) met from 1 September 2000 to 31 August 2003. All 628 members of the two chambers of Congress were elected in the elections of July 2000.

== Senators of the LVIII Legislature ==
=== By state ===
State	Name	Party	State	Name	Party
Mexico	Micaela Aguilar González	PAN	Coahuila	Luis Alberto Rico	PAN
Durango	Adrián Alanís Quiñones	PRI	Michoacán	Serafín Ríos Álvarez	PRD
Baja California Sur	Rodimiro Amaya Téllez	PRI	Yucatán	Eric Rubio Barthell	PRI
Hidalgo	Esteban Ángeles Cerón	PRI	Puebla	Rafael Cañedo Benítez	PRI
Guerrero	Héctor Astudillo	PRI	Oaxaca	Miguel Sánchez Carreño	PRI
Colima	Salvador Becerra Rodríguez	PAN	Puebla	Germán Sierra Sánchez	PRI
Zacatecas	José Eulogio Bonilla	PRI	Guanajuato	Susana Stephenson; Replacing Juan Manuel Oliva	PAN
Zacatecas	Genaro Borrego Estrada	PRI	Sinaloa	Martha Tamayo	PRI
Tabasco	Óscar Cantón Zetina	PRI	Colima	Víctor Manuel Torres	PAN
Sinaloa	José Adalberto Castro Castro; Replacing Lauro Díaz Castro	PRI	Tabasco	Georgina Trujillo Zentella	PRI
Tlaxcala	Joaquín Cisneros Fernández	PRI	Guerrero	Héctor Vicario Castrejón	PRI
Chihuahua	Javier Corral Jurado	PAN	Jalisco	Felipe Vicencio Álvarez	PAN
Campeche	Aracely Escalante Jasso	PRI	Sonora	Carlos Manuel Villalobos Organista; Replacing Ramón Corral Ávila	PAN
Baja California	Héctor Osuna Jaime	PAN	Morelos	Marco Antonio Xicoténcatl	PAN
Querétaro	Francisco Fernández de Cevallos	PAN	Coahuila	Jorge Zermeño Infante	PAN
Oaxaca	Ulises Ruiz Ortiz	PRI	Quintana Roo	Wadi Amar Shabshab	PAN
Aguscalientes	Benjamín Gallegos Soto	PAN	Sonora	Francisco Bojórquez Mungaray; Replacing Eduardo Bours	PRI
Federal District	Jesús Galván Muñoz	PAN	Veracruz	Gerardo Buganza	PAN
Tamaulipas	Laura Garza Galindo	PRI	Mexico	César Camacho Quiroz	PRI
Baja California Sur	Ricardo Gerardo Higuera	PRD	Durango	Rómulo Campuzano	PAN
Federal District	Emilia Gómez Bravo	PVEM	Zacatecas	Raymundo Cárdenas	PRD
Jalisco	Gildardo Gómez	PAN	Yucatán	José Alberto Castañeda; Replacing Patricio José Patrón Laviada	PAN
Nuevo León	Rigoberto González González; Replacing Adalberto Arturo Madero Quiroga	PAN	Guanajuato	Carlos Chaurand	PRI
Tlaxcala	Mariano González Zarur	PRI	Baja California Sur	José Carlos Cota Osuna	PRI
Veracruz	Noemí Guzmán Lagunes; Replacing Fernando Gutiérrez Barrios	PRI	Oaxaca	Daniel López Nelio	PRD
Querétaro	Guillermo Herbert Pérez	PAN	Chiapas	Rutilio Escandón	PRD
Morelos	Marco Antonio Adame	PAN	Nayarit	Rita María Esquivel Reyes	PAN
Chiapas	José Antonio Aguilar Bodegas	PRI	Puebla	Francisco Fraile	PAN
Quintana Roo	Addy Joaquín Coldwell	PAN	Michoacán	Antonio García Torres	PRI
Chihuahua	Jeffrey Max Jones	PAN	Aguascalientes	Fernando Gómez Esparza	PRI
Sonora	Héctor Larios Córdova	PAN	Jalisco	Raymundo Gómez Flores	PRI
San Luis Potosí	Jorge Lozano Armengol	PAN	San Luis Potosí	Yolanda González Hernández	PRI
Tamaulipas	Óscar Luebbert	PRI	Coahuila	Alejandro Gutiérrez Gutiérrez	PRI
Mexico	Carlos Madrazo Limón	PAN	Hidalgo	José Antonio Haghenbeck	PAN
Chiapas	Areli Madrid Tovilla	PRI	Querétaro	Silvia Hernández Enríquez	PRI
Nuevo León	Fernando Margáin	PAN	Guerrero	Armando Chavarría Barrera	PRD
Guanajuato	Filomena Margaiz; Replacing Ricardo Alaníz Posada	PAN	Colima	Héctor Michel Camarena	PRI
San Luis Potosí	Alberto Miguel Martínez Mireles	PAN	Sinaloa	Joaquín Montaño Yamuni	PAN
Michoacán	Rafael Melgoza Radillo; Replacing Lázaro Cárdenas Batel	PRD	Tamaulipas	Gustavo Cárdenas Gutiérrez	PAN
Campeche	Víctor Manuel Méndez Lanz	PRI	Campeche	Jorge Nordhausen	PAN
Baja California	Rafael Morgan Álvarez	PAN	Tabasco	César Raúl Ojeda Zubieta	PRD
Durango	Ismael Alfredo Hernandez Deras	PRI	Baja California	Roberto Pérez de Alva	PRI
Nayarit	Miguel Ángel Navarro Quintero	PRD	Tlaxcala	María del Carmen Ramírez	PRD
Quintana Roo	Eduardo Ovando Martínez	PRI	Federal District	Demetrio Sodi	Ind.
Yucatán	Orlando Paredes Lara	PRI	Chihuahua	Jorge Doroteo Zapata	PRI
Hidalgo	José Ernesto Gil Elorduy	PRI	Nuevo León	Rubén Zarazúa Rocha; Replacing Jesús Ricardo Canavati Tafich	PRI
Aguascalientes	Alfredo Reyes Velázquez	PAN			

=== Plurinominal Senators ===
State	Name	Party	State	Name	Party
Veracruz	Luis Ricardo Aldana	PRI	Federal District	Federico Ling Altamirano	PAN
Baja California	Joel Ayala Almeida	PRI	Sinaloa	Jorge Abel López Sánchez; Replacing José Natividad González Parás	PRI
Puebla	Manuel Bartlett Díaz	PRI	Tamaulipas	Lydia Madero García	PAN
Sonora	Leticia Burgos Ochoa	PRD	Guanajuato	Carlos Medina Plascencia	PAN
Federal District	Luisa María Calderón	PAN	Michoacán	Netzahualcóyotl de la Vega	PRI
Federal District	Sara Isabel Castellanos Cortés	PVEM	Veracruz	Elías Moreno Brizuela	PRD
Sonora	Luis Colosio Fernández	PRI	Federal District	Ramón Mota Sánchez	PRI
Durango	Marcos Carlos Cruz Martínez	PRD	Federal District	Jesús Ortega	PRD
Querétaro	Diego Fernández de Cevallos	PAN	Tabasco	Juan José Rodríguez Prats	PAN
Federal District	Emilio Gamboa Patrón	PRI	Federal District	Carlos Rojas Gutiérrez	PRI
Federal District	Jorge Emilio González Martínez	PVEM	Federal District	María Guadalupe Romero Castillo	PAN
Federal District	Fauzi Hamdan	PAN	Coahuila	Humberto Roque Villanueva	PRI
Veracruz	Guillermo Herrera Mendoza; Replacing Armando Méndez de la Luz	MC	Yucatán	Dulce María Sauri	PRI
Sinaloa	Enrique Jackson	PRI	Michoacán	Antonio Soto Sánchez	PRD
Coahuila	César Jáuregui Robles	PAN	Jalisco	Tomás Vázquez Vigil	PRI
Federal District	Gloria Lavara	PVEM	Baja California Sur	Verónica Velasco	PVEM

== Deputies of the LVIII Legislature ==
=== By state ===
State	Name	Party	State	Name	Party
Jalisco	Jaime Aceves Pérez	PAN	Coahuila	Óscar Maldonado Domínguez	PAN
Michoacán	Sergio Acosta Salazar	PRD	Guanajuato	Juan Mandujano Ramírez	PAN
Chiapas	Patricia Aguilar García	PRI	Veracruz	Jaime Mantecón Rojo	PRI
Mexico	Roberto Aguirre Solís	PAN	Veracruz	Pedro Manterola Sáinz	PRI
Nuevo León	Celita Alamilla	PAN	Puebla	Miguel Ángel Mantilla Martínez	PAN
Mexico	Moisés Alcalde Virgen	PAN	Puebla	José Ramón Mantilla y González	PAN
Puebla	Jaime Alcántara Silva	PRI	Hidalgo	Celia Martínez Bárcenas	PRI
Guanajuato	Juan Alcocer Flores	PAN	Jalisco	Miguel Ángel Martínez Cruz	PAN
Chiapas	Óscar Alvarado Cook	PRI	Morelos	Fernando Martínez Cué	PAN
Chiapas	Nicolás Álvarez Martínez	PRI	Federal District	Esteban Martínez Enríquez	PRD
Morelos	Gumercindo Álvarez Sotelo	PAN	Mexico	Enrique Martínez Orta	PRI
Guanajuato	José María Anaya Ochoa	PAN	Querétaro	Timoteo Martínez Pérez	PRI
Guerrero	Flor Añorve Ocampo	PRI	Nuevo León	Manuel Braulio Martínez Ramírez	PAN
Mexico	Zeferino Antunes Flores	PRD	Federal District	Elías Martínez Rufino	PRD
Veracruz	Francisco Arano Montero	PAN	San Luis Potosí	José Manuel Medellín	PRI
Chiapas	Enoch Araujo Sánchez	PAN	Oaxaca	Ángel Meixueiro	PRI
Federal District	José Antonio Arévalo González	PVEM	Tamaulipas	Enrique Meléndez Pérez	PRI
Coahuila	Miguel Arizpe Jiménez	PRI	Tlaxcala	Albino Mendieta Cuapio	PRI
Oaxaca	Pablo Arnaud Carreño	PAN	Oaxaca	María Lilia Mendoza Cruz	PRI
Mexico	María Teodora Arrieta	PRI	Oaxaca	Jaime Mendoza Ferra	PRI
Yucatán	Rosa Elena Baduy Isaac	PRI	Puebla	Marisela Meza Cabrera	PRI
Guerrero	Celestino Bailón Guerrero	PRI	Chihuahua	Gregorio Meza de la Rosa	PAN
Jalisco	José Bañales Castro	PRD	Sinaloa	Martha Ofelia Meza	PRI
Sinaloa	Jaime Barrón Fonseca	PRI	Jalisco	Rodrigo Mireles Pérez	PAN
Nuevo León	Zinthia Benavides	PAN	Mexico	María Cristina Moctezuma	PVEM
Yucatán	Jorge Carlos Berlín Montero	PRI	Baja California	César Alejandro Monraz	PAN
Baja California	Francisco Blake Mora	PAN	Mexico	Hermilo Monroy Pérez	PRI
Federal District	Miguel Bortolini	PRD	Michoacán	Cuauhtémoc Montero Esquivel	PRD
Chihuahua	Carlos Borunda Zaragoza	PAN	Yucatán	José Feliciano Moo	PRI
Campeche	Edilberto Buenfil Montalvo	PRI	Guanajuato	Martín Morales Barragán	PAN
Veracruz	Roberto Bueno Campos	PAN	Michoacán	Rogaciano Morales Reyes	PRD
Veracruz	Juan Nicolás Callejas Arroyo	PRI	Puebla	José Melitón Morales Sánchez	PRI
Tabasco	Feliciano Calzada Padrón	PRI	Oaxaca	Miguel Ángel Moreno Tello	PRI
Federal District	Nelly Campos	PAN	Federal District	José Benjamín Muciño Pérez	PAN
Federal District	Mauricio Candiani	PAN	Chihuahua	Manuel Narváez Narváez	PAN
Puebla	Cutberto Cantorán Espinosa	PRI	Chiapas	José Jacobo Nazar Morales	PRI
Nuevo León	Eloy Cantú Segovia	PRI	Guerrero	Juan José Nogueda Ruiz	PRI
Chiapas	Andrés Carballo Bustamante	PRI	Aguascalientes	José Luis Novales Arellano	PAN
San Luis Potosí	Juan Manuel Carreras López	PRI	Zacatecas	Magdalena Núñez Monreal	PRD
Baja California	Javier Castañeda Pomposo	PAN	Campeche	Ricardo Augusto Ocampo	PAN
Mexico	Salvador Castañeda Salcedo	PRI	Jalisco	Rodolfo Ocampo Velázquez	PAN
Veracruz	Bonifacio Castillo Cruz	PRD	Mexico	Felipe Olvera Nieto	PAN
Federal District	Manuel Castro y del Valle	PAN	Sonora	María Oroz Ibarra	PRI
San Luis Potosí	Pedro Pablo Cepeda Sierra	PAN	Veracruz	Manuel Orozco Garza	PRI
Puebla	Adela Cerezo Bautista	PRI	Michoacán	Donaldo Ortíz Colín	PRD
Mexico	Beatriz Cervantes Mandujano	PRI	Michoacán	Francisco Javier Ortiz Esquivel	PAN
Mexico	María Elena Chávez Palacios	PAN	Sonora	Vicente Pacheco Castañeda	PAN
Guanajauto	Francisco Javier Chico Goerne	PAN	Guanajuato	Clemente Padilla Silva	PRD
Federal District	Víctor Hugo Círigo Vázquez	PRD	Sonora	Guillermo Padrés Elías	PAN
Jalisco	José Abraham Cisneros Gómez	PAN	Guanajuato	Ramón Paniagua Jiménez	PAN
Jalisco	Tomás Coronado Olmos	PAN	Nuevo León	Juan Paredes Gloria	PRI
Mexico	Raquel Cortés López	PRD	Morelos	Bernardo Pastrana Gómez	PAN
Jalisco	Salvador Cosío Gaona	PRI	Chihuahua	Manuel Payán Novoa	PRI
Baja California Sur	Rosa Delia Cota Montaño	PT	Jalisco	Germán Pellegrini Pérez	PAN
Tlaxcala	Eréndira Cova Brindis	PRI	Hidalgo	David Penchyna Grub	PRI
Michoacán	Mario Cruz Andrade	PRD	Veracruz	Orestes Pérez Cruz	PAN
Chiapas	Jesús Alejandro Cruz Gutiérrez	PRI	Sonora	Marcos Pérez Esquer	PAN
Veracruz	Abel Ignacio Cuevas Melo	PAN	Guerrero	Héctor Pineda Velázquez	PRI
Nuevo León	Arturo de la Garza Tijerina	PRI	Puebla	Manuel Pozos Cruz	PRI
Coahuila	Jesús de la Rosa Godoy	PRI	Colima	Roberto Preciado Cuevas	PRI
Zacatecas	Óscar del Real Muñoz	PRI	Tabasco	Enrique Priego Oropeza	PRI
Sinaloa	Fernando Díaz de la Vega	PRI	Federal District	Julieta Prieto Fuhrken	PVEM
Veracruz	Guillermo Díaz Gea	PRI	Nayarit	José Manuel Quintanilla Rentería	PRI
Durango	José Manuel Díaz Medina	PRI	Mexico	Rafael Ramírez Agama	PAN
Chiapas	Roberto Domínguez Castellanos	PRI	Durango	Francisco Ramírez Ávila	PAN
Veracruz	Nemesio Domínguez Domínguez	PRI	Federal District	Francisco Ramírez Cabrera	PAN
Durango	Rodolfo Dorador	PAN	Federal District	Daniel Ramírez del Valle	PAN
Michoacán	Manuel Duarte Ramírez	PRD	Mexico	Griselda Ramírez Guzmán	PAN
Colima	Jesús Dueñas Llerenas	PAN	Jalisco	Rafael Ramírez Sánchez	PAN
Zacatecas	Alfonso Elías Cardona	PRD	Federal District	Mario Reyes Oviedo	PAN
Chihuahua	Hortencia Enríquez Ortega	PRI	Michoacán	Jesús Reyna García	PRI
Oaxaca	Edith Escobar Camacho	PRI	Quintana Roo	Alicia Ricalde Magaña	PAN
Quintana Roo	Héctor Esquiliano Solís	PRI	Veracruz	Francisco Ríos Alarcón	PRI
Mexico	Hilario Esquivel Martínez	PAN	Veracruz	Tomás Ríos Bernal	PAN
Michoacán	José Luis Esquivel Zalpa	PRD	Federal District	José María Rivera Cabello	PAN
Mexico	Ismael Estrada Colín	PRI	Guanajuato	José Rivera Carranza	PAN
Coahuila	Silvestre Faya Viesca	PAN	Querétaro	Javier Rodríguez Ferrusca	PAN
Federal District	Sara Guadalupe Figueroa Canedo	PVEM	Hidalgo	Cristóbal Rodríguez Galván	PRI
Jalisco	Francisco Javier Flores Chávez	PAN	Michoacán	Jaime Rodríguez López	PRI
Veracruz	Édgar Flores Galván	PRI	Aguascalientes	José Roque Rodríguez López	PAN
Federal District	Carlos Alberto Flores Gutiérrez	PAN	Sinaloa	Jorge Rodríguez Pasos	PT
Chiapas	Roberto Javier Fuentes Domínguez	PRI	Chihuahua	David Rodríguez Torres	PAN
Mexico	Lionel Funes Díaz	PAN	Mexico	Valdemar Romero Reyna	PAN
San Luis Potosí	Adrián Salvador Galarza González	PAN	Coahuila	María Romo Castillón	PAN
Guerrero	Lourdes Gallardo Pérez	PRI	Veracruz	Pedro Rosaldo Salazar	PRD
Sinaloa	Víctor Manuel Gandarilla	PRI	Veracruz	Elizabeth Rosas López	PRI
Federal District	Delfino Garcés	PRD	Guanajuato	Luis Gerardo Rubio Valdez	PRI
Tamaulipas	Francisco Javier García Cabeza de Vaca	PAN	Guanajuato	Juan Carlos Sáinz Lozano	PAN
Nuevo León	Orlando García Flores	PAN	Federal District	Concepción Salazar González	PVEM
Tlaxcala	Javier García González	PRI	Morelos	Maricela Sánchez Cortés	PRI
Zacatecas	José Antonio García Leyva	PRI	Federal District	Luis Fernando Sánchez Nava	PAN
Jalisco	Marcelo García Morales	PRI	Baja California	Alfonso Sánchez Rodríguez	PAN
Jalisco	Sergio García Sepúlveda	PAN	Chihuahua	Jorge Esteban Sandoval Ochoa	PRI
Federal District	Raúl García Velázquez	PAN	Guerrero	Juan Manuel Santamaría Ramírez	PRI
Tamaulipas	Enrique Garza Támez	PRI	Veracruz	Jorge Schettino Pérez	PRI
Tamaulipas	Gustavo Adolfo González Balderas	PRI	Federal District	Mónica Serrano Peña	PAN
Puebla	Concepción González Molina	PRI	Michoacán	Rafael Servín Maldonado	PRD
Guerrero	Raúl Homero González Villalva	PRI	Guanajuato	Francisco Sheffield	PAN
Nuevo León	Raúl Gracia Guzmán	PAN	Hidalgo	Raúl Sicilia Salgado	PRI
Veracruz	Roque Gracia Sánchez	PRI	Oaxaca	Teodoro Solano Camacho	PRI
San Luis Potosí	Beatriz Grande López	PAN	Mexico	Martín Solís Alatorre	PAN
Tabasco	Adela Graniel Campos	PRD	Hidalgo	Gerardo Sosa Castelán	PRI
Mexico	Francisco Guadarrama López	PAN	Guerrero	David Sotelo Rosas	PRD
Guerrero	Santiago Guerrero Gutiérrez	PRI	Federal District	Máximo Soto Gómez	PAN
Mexico	Alejandro Gutiérrez Gutiérrez	PAN	Oaxaca	José Soto Martínez	PRI
Guanajuato	Miguel Gutiérrez Hernández	PAN	Chiapas	Carlos Soto Monsón	PRI
Yucatán	Miguel Ángel Gutiérrez Machado	PAN	Querétaro	José Ramón Soto Reséndiz	PAN
Jalisco	Jaime Hernández González	PRI	Puebla	Erika Spezia Maldonado	PVEM
Hidalgo	Juan Alonso Hernández Hernández	PRI	Mexico	Héctor Taboada Contreras	PAN
San Luis Potosí	Justino Hernández Hilaria	PRI	Tabasco	Jesús Taracena Martínez	PRI
Federal District	Alfredo Hernández Raigosa	PRD	Jalisco	José María Tejeda Vázquez	PAN
Oaxaca	Benjamín Félix Hernández Ruiz	PRI	Mexico	Luis Trejo García	PAN
Nuevo León	Julián Hernández Santillán	PAN	Tamaulipas	Librado Treviño	PRI
Aguascalientes	Fernando Herrera Ávila	PAN	Guanajuato	Fernando Ugalde Cardona	PAN
Tamaulipas	Diego Alonso Hinojosa Aguerrevere	PAN	San Luis Potosí	José Luis Ugalde Montes	PRI
Federal District	Mauro Huerta Díaz	PAN	Jalisco	Jorge Urdapilleta Núñez	PAN
Jalisco	Jesús Hurtado Torres	PAN	Durango	Olga Margarita Uriarte	PRI
Sinaloa	Policarpo Infante	PRI	Chihuahua	Arturo Urquidi Astorga	PAN
Sinaloa	Aarón Irízar López	PRI	Veracruz	Sergio Vaca Betancourt	PAN
Mexico	José Jaimes García	PRI	Coahuila	Armín Valdés Torres	PRI
Nayarit	Luis Eduardo Jiménez Agraz	PRI	Nayarit	Álvaro Vallarta Ceceña	PRI
Mexico	Marco Vinicio Juárez Fierro	PAN	Mexico	Jaime Vázquez Castillo	PRI
Federal District	Jorge Alberto Lara Rivera	PAN	Baja California Sur	Miguel Vega Pérez	PRI
Oaxaca	Jaime Larrazabal Bretón	PRI	Puebla	Alfonso Vicente Díaz	PAN
Federal District	Cecilia Laviada Hernández	PAN	Tabasco	Julio César Vidal Pérez	PRI
Veracruz	Eduardo Leines Barrera	PRI	Baja California	Juvenal Vidrio	PAN
Puebla	José Gaudencio León Castañeda	PAN	Guanajuato	Joel Vilches Mares	PAN
Sonora	Arturo León Lerma	PRI	Jalisco	Enrique Villa Preciado	PRI
Federal District	Martha Limón Aguirre	PAN	Tamaulipas	Simón Villar Martínez	PRI
Jalisco	Julio César Lizárraga López	PAN	Coahuila	Néstor Villarreal Castro	PAN
Yucatán	Silvia López Scoffie	PAN	Guanajuato	Luis Alberto Villarreal	PAN
Tabasco	Rosalinda López Hernández	PRD	Nuevo León	José Villarreal Gutiérrez	PRI
Chiapas	Santiago López Hernández	PRI	Chihuahua	Luis Villegas Montes	PAN
Zacatecas	Silverio López Magallanes	PRI	Puebla	Benito Vital	PRI
Veracruz	Marcos López Mora	PRI	Federal District	Samuel Yoselevitz	PAN
Michoacán	Salvador López Orduña	PAN	Veracruz	José Francisco Yunes Zorrilla	PRI
Federal District	José de Jesús López Sandoval	PAN	Chiapas	Adolfo Zamora Cruz	PRI
Federal District	José Tomás Lozano Pardinas	PAN	Baja California	Hugo Zepeda Berrelleza	PAN
Durango	Gustavo Lugo Espinoza	PRI	Oaxaca	Nahum Zorrilla Cuevas	PRI
Sonora	Julián Luzanilla Contreras	PRI	Hidalgo	Juan Luis Zúñiga Velázquez	PRI
Guerrero	Sergio Maldonado Aguilar	PRI	Michoacán	Silvano Aureoles Conejo	PRD
Mexico	Alfonso Guillermo Bravo y Mier	PAN	Coahuila	Claudio Bres Garza	PRI
Sinaloa	Jesús Burgos Pinto	PRI	Nuevo León	Francisco Javier Cantú Torres	PAN
Mexico	Rodrigo Carrillo Pérez	PRD	Michoacán	Julio Castellanos Ramírez	PAN
Oaxaca	Cándido Coheto	PRI	Mexico	Carlos Cornejo Torres	PRI
Mexico	Raúl Covarrubias Zavala	PAN	Querétaro	Francisco de Silva Ruiz	PAN
Puebla	Víctor Emanuel Díaz Palacios	PRI	Oaxaca	Juan Ramón Díaz Pimentel	PRI
Puebla	María Luisa Domínguez Ramírez	PRI	Mexico	Gustavo Donis García	PRI
Nuevo León	Juan Manuel Duarte Dávila	PAN	Mexico	Armando Enríquez Flores	PAN
Puebla	Salvador Escobedo Zoletto	PAN	Sinaloa	Víctor Antonio García Dávila	PT
Quintana Roo	Juan Ignacio García Zalvidea	PVEM	Michoacán	Jesús Garibay García	PRD
Mexico	Emilio Goicoechea Luna	PAN	Mexico	Alejandro Gómez Olvera	PRD
Federal District	Héctor González Reza	PAN	Nayarit	Ney González Sánchez	PRI
Nuevo León	Abel Guerra	PRI	Veracruz	José María Guillén Torres	PRI
Chihuahua	Francisco Hugo Gutiérrez Dávila	PAN	Tamaulipas	Eugenio Hernández Flores	PRI
Guerrero	Heriberto Huicochea	PRI	Mexico	Tereso Martínez Aldana	PAN
Mexico	Juan Manuel Martínez Nava	PRI	Federal District	José Manuel Minjares	PAN
Tlaxcala	Héctor Ortiz Ortiz	PRI	Oaxaca	Irma Piñeyro Arias	PRI
Mexico	Ulises Ramírez Núñez	PAN	Chihuahua	César Patricio Reyes Roel	PAN
Chihuahua	José Mario Rodríguez Álvarez	PAN	Guerrero	Ernesto Rodríguez Escalona	PRI
Guerrero	Silvia Romero Suárez	PRI	Tamaulipas	Arturo San Miguel Cantú	PAN
Coahuila	Ernesto Saro Boardman	PAN	Hidalgo	Juan Manuel Sepúlveda Fayad	PRI
Oaxaca	Abel Trejo González	PRI	Guanajuato	Javier Usabiaga Arroyo	PAN
Mexico	Felipe Velasco Monroy	PAN	Sonora	María Isabel Velasco Ramos	PAN
Hidalgo	Carolina Viggiano	PRI	Coahuila	José Guillermo Anaya Llamas	PAN
Mexico	Eduardo Arnal Palomera	PAN	Mexico	Rafael Barrón Romero	PAN
Mexico	Gerardo de la Riva Pinal	PRI	Oaxaca	Bulmaro Rito Salinas	PRI

=== Plurinominal Deputies ===
State	Name	Party	State	Name	Party
Federal District	Carlos Humberto Aceves	PRI	Chihuahua	Francisco Jurado Contreras	PRI
Sinaloa	Enrique Aguilar Borrego^{[94]}	PRI	Colima	Ramón León Morales^{[104]}	PRD
Mexico	José Marcos Aguilar Moreno^{[198]}	PAN	Guerrero	Efrén Leyva Acevedo^{[96]}	PRI
Durango	Samuel Aguilar Solís^{[94]}	PRI	Sonora	Juan Leyva Mendívil	PRI
Guerrero	Rubén Aguirre Ponce^{[103]}	PRD	Michoacán	Nohelia Linares González	PAN
Mexico	Francisco Agundis Arias	PVEM	Sinaloa	Francisco Salvador López Brito	PAN
Yucatán	Luis Artemio Aldana Burgos	PAN	Mexico	Esther López Cruz	PRI
Tabasco	Jesús Alí de la Torre	PRI	Federal District	Francisco Javier López González	PAN
Tamaulipas	Edgar Alvarado García	PAN	Michoacán	Rafael López Hernández	PRI
Federal District	María Elena Álvarez García	PAN	Puebla	Victoria López Macías	PAN
Guanajuato	Silvia Álvarez Bruneliere	PAN	Guanajuato	María López Mares	PAN
Nuevo León	Alberto Anaya	PT	Mexico	Beatriz Lorenzo Juárez	PAS
Federal District	Hilda Anderson Nevárez	PRI	Zacatecas	José Carlos Luna Salas	PAN
Veracruz	Eduardo Andrade Sánchez	PRI	Jalisco	José Antonio Magallanes	PRD
Guerrero	Manuel Añorve Baños	PRI	Veracruz	Ranulfo Márquez Hernández	PRI
Nuevo León	Hortensia Aragón Castillo	PRD	Michoacán	María Cruz Martínez Colín	PAN
Guanajuato	Arcelia Arredondo García	PAN	Coahuila	Raúl Martínez González	PAN
Coahuila	Benjamín Ayala Velázquez	PRI	Aguascalientes	Martha Martínez Macías	PAN
Puebla	Miguel Barbosa Huerta	PRD	Aguascalientes	Lorena Martínez Rodríguez	PRI
Federal District	Maria Alejandra Barrales	PRD	Coahuila	Jaime Martínez Veloz	PRD
Morelos	Juana Barrera Amezcua	PAN	Tabasco	Humberto Domingo Mayans	PRD
Baja California	Enriqueta Basilio	PRI	Hidalgo	Héctor Méndez Alarcón	PAN
Tabasco	Lorena Beaurregard	PRI	Veracruz	Alba Leonila Méndez Herrera	PAN
Baja California	Bernardo Borbón Vilches	PAN	Tabasco	Lázaro Méndez López	PRD
Querétaro	José Alfredo Botello	PAN	Yucatán	José Mendicuti Pavón	PRI
Federal District	Esveida Bravo Martínez	PVEM	Federal District	Maricruz Montelongo Gordillo	PRI
Querétaro	Gustavo Buenrostro Díaz	PAN	Mexico	Ricardo Moreno Bastida	PRD
Federal District	José Antonio Calderón Cardoso	PAS	Jalisco	Humberto Muñoz Vargas	PAN
Nuevo León	Hugo Camacho Galván	PAN	Federal District	José Narro Céspedes	PT
Nuevo León	María Teresa Campoy Ruy	PVEM	Michoacán	Noé Navarrete González	PAN
Tlaxcala	Juan Cano Cortezano	PAN	Federal District	Tarcisio Navarrete	PAN
Veracruz	Luis Ariel Canto García	PAN	Sonora	Óscar Ochoa Patrón	PAN
Coahuila	Francisco Cárdenas Elizondo	PRI	Chiapas	Alfredo Ochoa Toledo	PRI
Baja California	Cuauhtémoc Cárdenas Benavides	PAN	Guerrero	Nabor Ojeda Delgado	PRI
Veracruz	Gustavo Carvajal Moreno	PRI	Mexico	Amado Olvera Castillo	PAN
Guerrero	Félix Castellanos Hernández	PT	Colima	Jesús Orozco Alfaro	PRI
Veracruz	Francisco Castro González	PRI	Nayarit	Rafael Orozco Martínez	PAN
Sinaloa	Florentino Castro López	PRI	San Luis Potosí	Miguel Ortíz Jonguitud	PRI
Nayarit	Miguel Castro Sánchez	PRI	Quintana Roo	Juan Carlos Pallares Bueno	PAN
Federal District	Raúl Cervantes Andrade	PRI	Tlaxcala	Beatriz Paredes Rangel	PRI
Nayarit	Jaime Cervantes Rivera	PT	Hidalgo	Francisco Patiño Cardona	PRD
Nuevo León	María Elena Chapa Hernández	PRI	Mexico	Hermelinda Pavón Jaramillo	PRI
Federal District	Jorge Chávez Presa	PRI	Tlaxcala	Rosalía Peredo Aguilar	PT
Federal District	Patricia Chozas y Chozas^{[104]}	PVEM	Federal District	Fernando Pérez Noriega	PAN
Mexico	Diego Cobo Terrazas^{[104]}	PVEM	Michoacán	Ramón Ponce Contreras	PAN
Jalisco	José Manuel Correa Ceseña	PRI	Tabasco	Luis Priego Ortíz	PRI
Mexico	Maricruz Cruz Morales	PRI	Durango	José Ramírez Gamero	PRI
Federal District	Gabriela Cuevas Barrón	PAN	Yucatán	Jorge Carlos Ramírez Marín	PRI
Guanajuato	Martha Dávalos Márquez	PAN	Veracruz	Enrique Ramos Rodríguez	PRI
Coahuila	Marco Antonio Dávila Montesinos	PRI	Chiapas	Carlos Raymundo Toledo	PRI
Federal District	Enrique de la Madrid Cordero	PRI	Zacatecas	Juan Carlos Regis Adame	PT
Yucatán	Bernardo de la Garza Herrera	PVEM	Federal District	Gustavo Riojas Santana	PSN
Zacatecas	Gilberto del Real Ruedas	PRD	Oaxaca	Patricia Riojas Santana	PSN
Mexico	José Manuel del Río Virgen	MC	Puebla	Eduardo Rivera Pérez	PAN
Jalisco	Martha del Toro Gaytán	PAN	Guanajuato	Salvador Rocha Díaz	PRI
Aguascalientes	Arturo Díaz Ornelas	PAN	Campeche	Rafael Rodríguez Barrera	PRI
San Luis Potosí	Elías Dip Ramé	PRI	Oaxaca	Rufino Rodríguez Cabrera	PRD
Veracruz	Genoveva Domínguez Rodríguez	PRD	Baja California	Amador Rodríguez Lozano	Ind.
Chihuahua	César Duarte Jáquez	PRI	Baja California Sur	Rigoberto Romero Aceves	PAN
Federal District	Rodolfo Echeverría Ruiz	PRI	Mexico	José Elías Romero Apis	PRI
Yucatán	Arturo Escobar y Vega	PVEM	Hidalgo	Carlos Romero Deschamps	PRI
Mexico	José Rodolfo Escudero Barrera	PVEM	Mexico	Roberto Ruiz Ángeles	PRI
Campeche	Uuc-kib Espadas Ancona	PRD	Nuevo León	Verónica Sada Pérez	PAN
Durango	Francisco Esparza Hernández	PAN	Guerrero	Félix Salgado Macedonio	PRD
Sonora	Manuel Espino Barrientos	PAN	Federal District	Armando Salinas Torre	PAN
Sinaloa	Rubén Félix Hays	PRI	Federal District	Francisco Javier Sánchez Campuzano	PRI
Sonora	Olga Flores Velázquez	PRI	Mexico	María Sánchez Lira	PRD
Michoacán	Manuel Galán Jiménez	PRI	Oaxaca	Héctor Sánchez López	PRD
Campeche	Rosario Gamboa Castillo	PAN	Mexico	Mario Sandoval Silvera	PAN
Querétaro	Nicasia García Domínguez	PVEM	Chiapas	César Augusto Santiago	PRI
Guanajuato	Rubén García Farías	PRI	Oaxaca	Luis Miguel Santibáñez	PAN
Oaxaca	María García Domínguez	PRI	Sinaloa	Petra Santos Ortíz	PRD
Guanajuato	Alejandro García Sáinz Arena	PVEM	Mexico	Reyes Silva Beltrán	PRI
Federal District	Miroslava García Suárez	PRD	Mexico	Bertha Simental	PSN
Zacatecas	Jorge Luis García Vera	PRI	Campeche	José Soberanis González	PRI
Querétaro	Rigoberto Garza Faz	PRI	Tamaulipas	Felipe Solís Acero	PRI
Tamaulipas	Manuel Garza González	PRI	Mexico	Víctor Hugo Sondón Saavedra	PAN
San Luis Potosí	Rómulo Garza Martínez	PAN	Mexico	Heidi Storsberg	PAN
Jalisco	José Antonio Gloria Morales	PAN	Guerrero	María Teresa Tapia Bahena	PAN
Aguascalientes	Augusto Gómez Villanueva	PRI	Federal District	María Tapia Medina	PRD
Federal District	María Teresa Gómez Mont	PAN	Federal District	Miguel Ángel Torrijos Mendoza	PAN
Michoacán	José Luis González Aguilera	PRI	Nuevo León	Francisco Treviño Cabello	PAN
Mexico	Rodolfo González Guzmán	PRI	Michoacán	Agustín Trujillo Íñiguez	PRI
Yucatán	Federico Granja Ricalde	PRI	Mexico	Emilio Ulloa Pérez	PRD
Nuevo León	Ildefonso Guajardo Villarreal	PRI	Jalisco	Alonso Ulloa Vélez	PAN
Mexico	Lorenzo Hernández Estrada	PRD	Sinaloa	Gregorio Urias Germán	PRD
Oaxaca	José Antonio Hernández Fraguas	PRI	Tabasco	Carlos Alberto Valenzuela Cabrales	PAN
Quintana Roo	Mercedes Hernández Rojas	PAN	Federal District	Eddie Varón Levy	PRI
Aguascalientes	Luis Herrera Jiménez	PRD	Jalisco	José Velázquez Hernández	PRI
Federal District	Enrique Herrera y Bruquetas	PRD	Yucatán	Eric Villanueva Mukul	PRD
Veracruz	Arturo Herviz Reyes	PRD	Hidalgo	Nicollás Villegas Flores	PAN
Zacatecas	Josefina Hinojosa Herrera	PRI	Veracruz	Apuleyo Viniegra	PAN
Sonora	Guillermo Hopkins Gámez	PRI	San Luis Potosí	Alejandro Zapata Perogordo	PAN
Zacatecas	Víctor Infante González	PAN	Sinaloa	Roberto Zavala Echavarría	PRI
Nuevo León	Fanny Arellanes Cervantes	PAN	Tlaxcala	Benjamín Ávila Márquez	PAN
Mexico	Martha Angélica Bernardino Rojas	PRD	Michoacán	Felipe Calderón	PAN
Mexico	Lucio Fernández González	PAN	Aguascalientes	Ricardo García Cervantes	PAN
Jalisco	María García Gaytán	PAN	Nuevo León	Jesús Mario Garza Guevara	PAN
Veracruz	Roger Antonio González Herrera	PAN	Tabasco	Auldárico Hernández Gerónimo	PRD
Federal District	Óscar Levín Coppel	PRI	Campeche	Juan Camilo Mouriño	PAN
Federal District	César Nava Vázquez	PAN	Jalisco	José María Núñez Murillo	PAN
Querétaro	Fernando Ortiz Arana	PRI	Veracruz	Luis Pazos	PAN
Oaxaca	Norma Reyes Terán	PRD	Morelos	Adrián Rivera Pérez	PAN
Colima	Jaime Salazar Silva	PAN	Guerrero	Esteban Sotelo Salgado	PAN
Jalisco	Herbert Taylor Arthur	PAN	Zacatecas	Tomás Torres Mercado	PRD
Guanajuato	Ricardo Torres Origel	PAN			

Preceded by LVII Legislature	LVIII Legislature; September 2000 to August 2003	Succeeded by LIX Legislature
