= Pallares =

Pallares, Pallarés or Pallarès is a Spanish and Catalan surname. Notable people with the surname include:

- Alex Pallarés (born 1979), Spanish football manager
- Danilo Pallares Echeverría, Uruguayan writer and musician
- Isabel Pallarès (1964–2021), Spanish Catalan trade unionist
- Juan Carlos Pallares Bueno (born 1970), Mexican politician
- Juan Frausto Pallares (1941–2026), Mexican Roman Catholic prelate
- Judith Pallarés i Cortés (born 1972), Andorran politician
- Luis Manuel Arias Pallares, Mexican politician
- Margarita Pérez Pallares, former First Lady of Ecuador
- Michael-Ray Pallares González (born 1980), Dominican tennis player
- Pablo Pallarés (born 1987), Spanish footballer
- Pilar Pallarés (born 1957), Spanish Galician poet
- Rodrigo Pallares (1925–2009), Ecuadorian architect
- Santiago Pallares (born 1994), Uruguayan footballer

== See also ==
- Coalcomán de Vázquez Pallares, municipality in Mexico
