= 11th federal electoral district of the State of Mexico =

Federal electoral district of Mexico

State of Mexico's 11th
- Electoral district of the Chamber of Deputies of Mexico

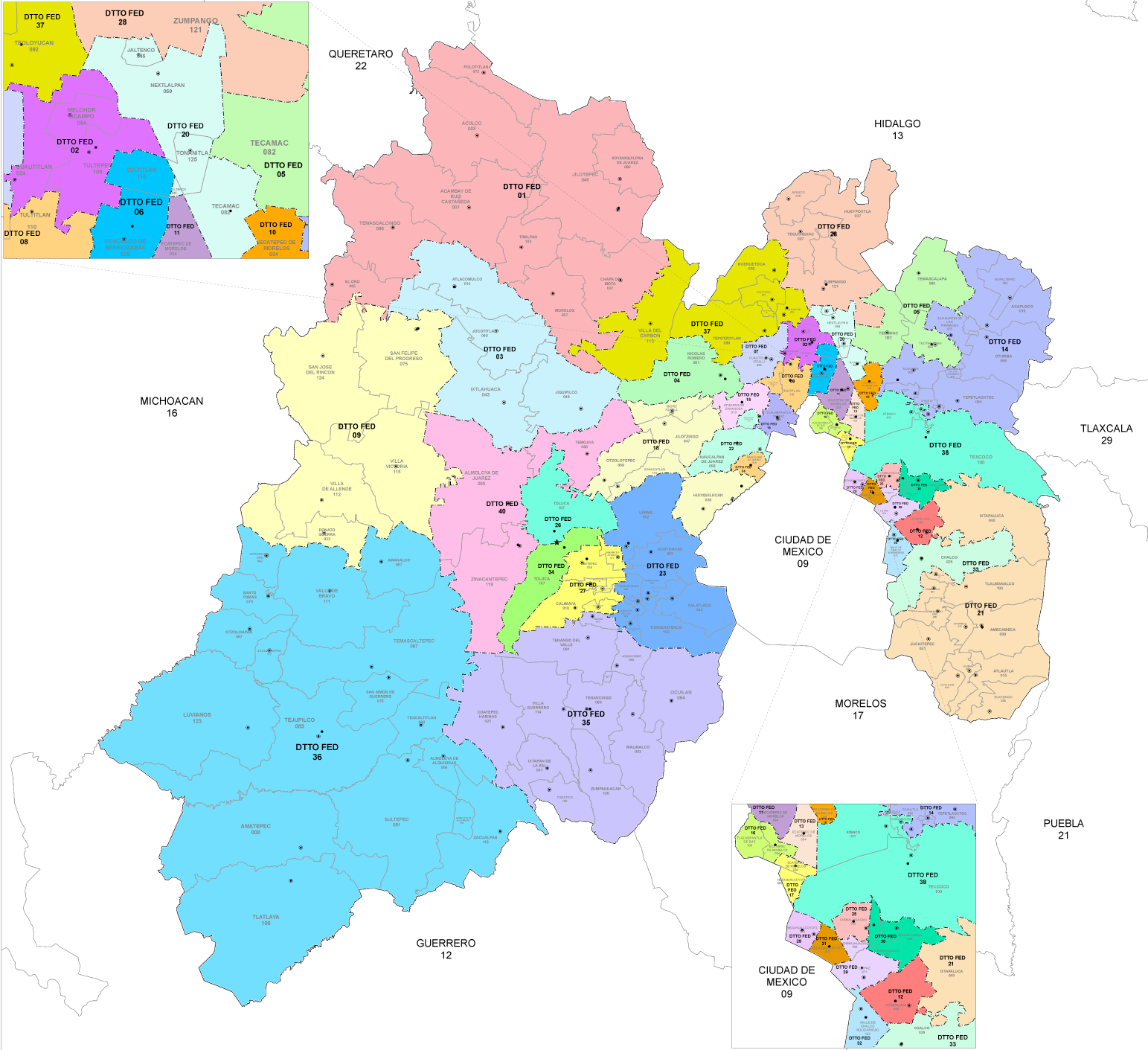
- State of Mexico's districts since 2023

Incumbent
- Member: Xóchitl Teresa Arzola Vargas
- Party: ▌Morena
- Congress: 66th (2024–2027)

District
- State: State of Mexico
- Head town: Ecatepec
- Coordinates: 19°37′N 99°03′W
- Covers: Ecatepec de Morelos (part)
- PR region: Fifth
- Precincts: 165
- Population: 428,164 (2020 census)

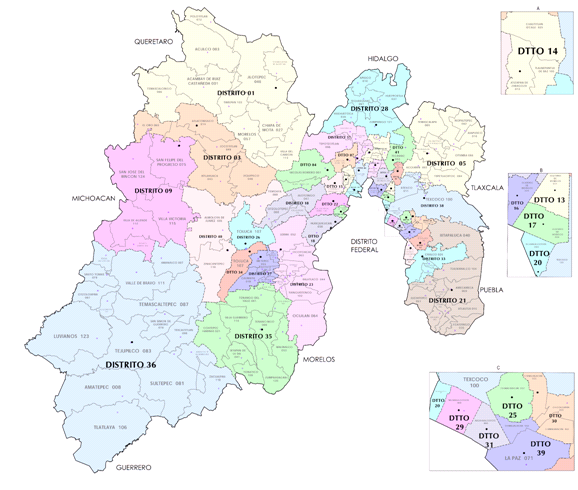
2017–2022 districting scheme

The 11th federal electoral district of the State of Mexico (Spanish: Distrito electoral federal 11 del Estado de México) is one of the 300 electoral districts into which Mexico is divided for elections to the federal Chamber of Deputies and one of 40 such districts in the State of Mexico.

It elects one deputy to the lower house of Congress for each three-year legislative session by means of the first-past-the-post system. Votes cast in the district also count towards the calculation of proportional representation ("plurinominal") deputies elected from the fifth region.

The current member for the district, elected in the 2024 general election, is Xóchitl Teresa Arzola Vargas of the National Regeneration Movement (Morena).

== District territory ==
Under the 2023 districting plan adopted by the National Electoral Institute (INE), which is to be used for the 2024, 2027 and 2030 federal elections, the 11th district is located in the Greater Mexico City urban area, covering 165 precincts (secciones electorales) in the north-western portion of one of the state's 125 municipalities:

- Ecatepec de Morelos (Note: The remainder of Ecatepec is covered by the 10th, 13th, 16th and 17th districts.)

The head town (cabecera distrital), where results from individual polling stations are gathered together and tallied, is the city of Ecatepec. In the 2020 census, the district reported a total population of 428,164.

== Previous districting schemes ==
Evolution of electoral district numbers
	1974	1978	1996	2005	2017	2023
State of Mexico	15	34	36	40	41	40
Chamber of Deputies	196	300				

Under the previous districting plans enacted by the INE and its predecessors, the 11th district was situated as follows:

2017–2022

A portion of Ecatepec.

2005–2017

A portion of Ecatepec.

1996–2005

A portion of Ecatepec.

1978–1996

Portions of the municipalities of Ecatepec and Tlalnepantla, with its head town at San Cristóbal Ecatepec.

== Deputies returned to Congress ==
(Mexico) National parties
- Current
- PAN
- PRI
- PT
- PVEM
- MC
- Morena
- PAZ
- Somos
- Defunct or local only
- PLM
- PNR
- PRM
- PNM
- PP
- PPS
- PARM
- PFCRN
- CON
- PANAL
- PSD
- PES
- PES
- PRD

State of Mexico's 11th district
Election	Deputy	Party	Term	Legislature
1916	Antonio Aguilar		1916–1917	Constituent Congress of Querétaro
...
1979	Héctor Jarquín Hernández	Institutional Revolutionary Party	1979–1982	51st Congress
1982	Luis Mayén Ruiz	Institutional Revolutionary Party	1982–1985	52nd Congress
1985	Heriberto Serrano Moreno	Institutional Revolutionary Party	1985–1988	53rd Congress
1988	Javier Gaeta Vázquez	Institutional Revolutionary Party	1988–1991	54th Congress
1991	Rafael Maldonado Villafuerte	Institutional Revolutionary Party	1991–1994	55th Congress
1994	Jorge Cortés Vences	Institutional Revolutionary Party	1994–1997	56th Congress
1997	Teobaldo López Huertas	Party of the Democratic Revolution	1997–2000	57th Congress
2000	Martín Hugo Solís Alatorre	National Action Party (Mexico)	2000–2003	58th Congress
2003	Rubén Maximiliano Alexander Rábago; Ciro García Marín (Note: García Marín, the alternate, was sworn in on 1 Feb 2006.)	National Action Party (Mexico)	2003–2006; 2006	59th Congress
2006	Salvador Ruiz Sánchez	Party of the Democratic Revolution	2006–2009	60th Congress
2009	Jorge Hernández Hernández	Institutional Revolutionary Party	2009–2012	61st Congress
2012	Brenda María Izontli Alvarado Sánchez	Institutional Revolutionary Party	2012–2015	62nd Congress
2015	Pablo Bedolla López	Institutional Revolutionary Party	2015–2018	63rd Congress
2018	María Eugenia Hernández Pérez	National Regeneration Movement	2018–2021	64th Congress
2021	María Eugenia Hernández Pérez	National Regeneration Movement	2021–2024	65th Congress
2024	Xóchitl Teresa Arzola Vargas	National Regeneration Movement	2024–2027	66th Congress

== Presidential elections ==
State of Mexico's 11th district
Election	District won by	Party or coalition	%
2018	Andrés Manuel López Obrador	Juntos Haremos Historia	58.9574
2024	Claudia Sheinbaum Pardo	Sigamos Haciendo Historia	66.9998
