= 27th federal electoral district of the Federal District =

Defunct federal electoral district of Mexico

Coordinates: 19.27°N 99.00°W

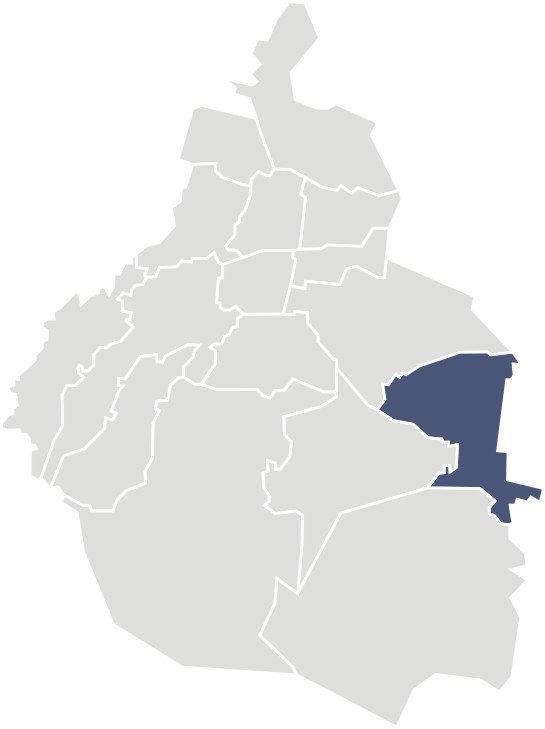
The 27th district in 2005–2017

The twenty-seventh federal electoral district of the Federal District (Spanish: Distrito electoral federal 27 del Distrito Federal) is a defunct federal electoral district of Mexico. Occupying a portion of what is today Mexico City, it was in existence from 1973 to 2017.

During that time, it returned one deputy to the Chamber of Deputies for each three-year legislative session by means of the first-past-the-post system, electing its first in the 1973 mid-term election and its last in the 2015 mid-terms. From 1979 onwards, votes cast in the district also counted towards the calculation of proportional representation ("plurinominal") deputies elected from the country's electoral regions.

The 25th, 26th and 27th districts were abolished by the National Electoral Institute (INE) in its 2017 redistricting process because the capital's population no longer warranted that number of seats in Congress.

== District territory ==
Evolution of electoral district numbers
| | 1974 | 1978 | 1996 | 2005 | 2017 | 2023 |
|---|---|---|---|---|---|---|
| Mexico City (Federal District) | 27 | 40 | 30 | 27 | 24 | 22 |
| Chamber of Deputies | 196 | 300 | | | | |

2005–2017

In its final form, when the capital accounted for 27 districts, the 27th was located in the south-east of the city. It covered the whole of the borough of Tláhuac.

1996–2005

Under the 1996 scheme, the capital comprised 30 districts. The 27th covered Tláhuac and the neighbouring borough of Milpa Alta to the south.

1978–1996

The districting scheme in force from 1978 to 1996 was the result of the 1977 electoral reforms, which increased the number of single-member seats in the Chamber of Deputies from 196 to 300. Under that plan, the Federal District's seat allocation rose from 27 to 40. The 27th district covered portions of the boroughs of Coyoacán, Iztapalapa and Tlalpan.

== Deputies returned to Congress ==
(Mexico) National parties
- Current
- PAN
- PRI
- PT
- PVEM
- MC
- Morena
- Defunct or local only
- PLM
- PNR
- PRM
- PNM
- PP
- PPS
- PARM
- PFCRN
- Convergencia
- PANAL
- PSD
- PES
- PES
- PRD

Federal District's 27th district
| Election | Deputy | Party | Term | Legislature |
|---|---|---|---|---|
| 1973 | Ernesto Aguilar Cordero | Institutional Revolutionary Party | 1973–1976 | 49th Congress |
| 1976 | Hugo Roberto Castro Aranda | Institutional Revolutionary Party | 1976–1979 | 50th Congress |
| 1979 | Humberto Rodolfo Olguín | Institutional Revolutionary Party | 1979–1982 | 51st Congress |
| 1982 | Xóchitl Llarena del Rosario | Institutional Revolutionary Party | 1982–1985 | 52nd Congress |
| 1985 | Gilberto Nieves Jenkin | Institutional Revolutionary Party | 1985–1988 | 53rd Congress |
| 1988 | Juan José Hernández Trejo | National Action Party (Mexico) | 1988–1991 | 54th Congress |
| 1991 | Silvia Pinal Hidalgo | Institutional Revolutionary Party | 1991–1994 | 55th Congress |
| 1994 | Rosario Guerra Díaz | Institutional Revolutionary Party | 1994–1997 | 56th Congress |
| 1997 | Alejandro Ordorica Saavedra (Note: Ordorica Saavedra resigned his seat on 28 December 1999.); Sergio Ávila Rojas | Party of the Democratic Revolution | 1997–1999; 1999–2000 | 57th Congress |
| 2000 | José Delfino Garcés Martínez | Party of the Democratic Revolution | 2000–2003 | 58th Congress |
| 2003 | José Luis Cabrera Padilla | Party of the Democratic Revolution | 2003–2006 | 59th Congress |
| 2006 | Guadalupe Flores Salazar | Party of the Democratic Revolution | 2006–2009 | 60th Congress |
| 2009 | Rigoberto Salgado Vázquez | Party of the Democratic Revolution | 2009–2012 | 61st Congress |
| 2012 | Guadalupe Flores Salazar | Party of the Democratic Revolution | 2012–2015 | 62nd Congress |
| 2015 | Norma Xóchitl Hernández Colín | National Regeneration Movement | 2015–2018 | 63rd Congress |
