= Vinicio (name) =

Vinicio is a male Italian, Portuguese and Spanish given name and a surname. Notable people with the name include:

== Given names ==
- Vinicio Adames (1927–1976), Venezuelan musician
- Vinicio Angulo (born 1988), Ecuadorian politician
- Vinicio Bernardini (1926–2020), Italian politician
- Vinicio Capossela (born 1965), Italian singer-songwriter, poet and novelist
- Vinicio Castilla (born 1967), Mexican baseball player
- Vinicio Cerezo (born 1942), Guatemalan politician
- Vinicio Espinal (born 1982), Dominican footballer
- Vinicio Gómez (1961–2008), Guatemalan politician
- Vinicio Marchioni (born 1975), Italian actor
- Vinicio Paladini (1902–1971), Italian architect, painter and art theorist
- Vinicio Ron (born 1954), Ecuadorian footballer
- Vinicio Salmi (born 1956), Italian motorcycle road racer
- Vinicio Sofia (1907–1982), Italian actor and voice actor
- Vinicio Verza (born 1957), Italian footballer

== Middle names ==
- Albert Vinicio Baez (1912–2007), Mexican-American physicist
- Cesar Vinicio Cervo de Luca (born 1979), Brazilian footballer
- Gino Vinicio Gentili (1914–2006), Italian archaeologist
- Marco Vinicio Juárez Fierro (born 1976), Mexican politician
- Marco Vinicio Redondo Quirós, Costa Rican politician
- Marco Vinicio Vargas Pereira (born 1954), Costa Rican politician
- Marino Vinicio Castillo (born 1931), Dominican lawyer

== Surnames ==
- Luís Vinício (born 1932), Brazilian footballer

== See also ==
- Marcos Vinicios Lopes Moura (born 2001), Brazilian footballer
