= Héctor Méndez =

Héctor Méndez is the name of:

- Héctor Méndez (boxer) (1897–1977), Argentine welterweight professional boxer
- Héctor Méndez (actor) (1913–1980), Argentine film actor
- Héctor Méndez Alarcón (born 1959), Mexican politician from Hidalgo
- Héctor Méndez (rugby union), Argentine former rugby union footballer and coach
