= Viesca (disambiguation) =

Viesca is a town in the Mexican state of Coahuila. Viesca may also refer to:

== People ==
- Agustín Viesca (1790–1845), Mexican politician
- José María Viesca (1787–1856), Mexican politician
- Silvestre Faya Viesca (born 1952), Mexican politician

== Other uses ==
- Viesca Municipality, municipality in the Mexican state of Coahuila
- Sarahville de Viesca, Texas, ghost town in the U.S. state of Texas
