= Salvador Ruiz =

Salvador Ruiz may refer to:

- Salvador Ruiz de Chávez Ochoa (born 1938), Mexican academic and Olympic swimmer
- Salvador Ruiz de Luna (1908–1978), Spanish composer, worked on The Red Rose (1960 film) et al.
- Salvador Ruiz Rodríguez (born 1995), Spanish footballer known as Salva Ruiz
- Salvador Ruiz Sánchez (born 1961), Mexican politician
