= 25th federal electoral district of the Federal District =

Defunct federal electoral district of Mexico

Coordinates: 19°16′N 99°08′W

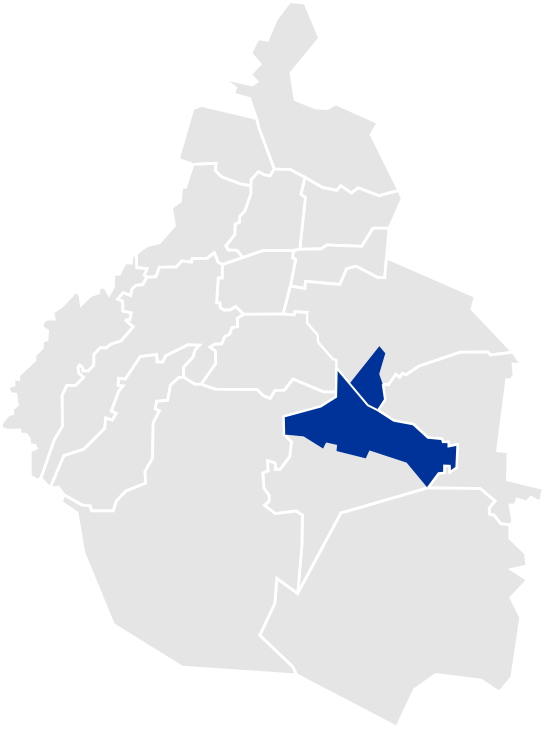
The 25th district in 2005–2017

The 25th federal electoral district of the Federal District (Spanish: Distrito electoral federal 25 del Distrito Federal) is a defunct federal electoral district of Mexico. Occupying a portion of what is today Mexico City, it was in existence from 1973 to 2017.

During that time, it returned one deputy to the Chamber of Deputies for each three-year legislative session by means of the first-past-the-post system, electing its first in the 1973 mid-term election and its last in the 2015 mid-terms. From 1979 onwards, votes cast in the district also counted towards the calculation of proportional representation ("plurinominal") deputies elected from the country's electoral regions.

The 25th, 26th and 27th districts were abolished by the National Electoral Institute (INE) in its 2017 redistricting process because the capital's population no longer warranted that number of seats in Congress.

== District territory ==
Evolution of electoral district numbers
| | 1974 | 1978 | 1996 | 2005 | 2017 | 2023 |
|---|---|---|---|---|---|---|
| Mexico City (Federal District) | 27 | 40 | 30 | 27 | 24 | 22 |
| Chamber of Deputies | 196 | 300 | | | | |

2005–2017

In its final form, when the capital accounted for 27 districts, the 25th covered 89 electoral precincts (secciones electorales) in the north of the borough of Xochimilco and 77 precincts in the borough of Iztapalapa.

1996–2005

Under the 1996 scheme, the capital comprised 30 districts. The 25th was located wholly in the borough of Iztapalapa.

1978–2005

The districting scheme in force from 1978 to 1996 was the result of the 1977 electoral reforms, which increased the number of single-member seats in the Chamber of Deputies from 196 to 300. Under that plan, the Federal District's seat allocation rose from 27 to 40. The 25th district covered a part of the borough of Gustavo A. Madero in the north of the city.

== Deputies returned to Congress ==
(Mexico) National parties
- Current
- PAN
- PRI
- PT
- PVEM
- MC
- Morena
- PAZ
- Somos MX
- Defunct or local only
- PLM
- PNR
- PRM
- PNM
- PP
- PPS
- PARM
- PFCRN
- CON
- PANAL
- PSD
- PES
- PES
- PRD

Federal District's 25th district
| Election | Deputy | Party | Term | Legislature |
|---|---|---|---|---|
| 1973 | Luis Adolfo Santibáñez Belmont | Institutional Revolutionary Party | 1973–1976 | 49th Congress |
| 1976 | Celia Torres de Sánchez | Institutional Revolutionary Party | 1976–1979 | 50th Congress |
| 1979 | María Eugenia Moreno Gómez | Institutional Revolutionary Party | 1979–1982 | 51st Congress |
| 1982 | Jesús Salazar Toledano | Institutional Revolutionary Party | 1982–1985 | 52nd Congress |
| 1985 | Santiago Oñate Laborde | Institutional Revolutionary Party | 1985–1988 | 53rd Congress |
| 1988 | Demetrio Sodi de la Tijera | Institutional Revolutionary Party | 1988–1991 | 54th Congress |
| 1991 | Alberto Nava Salgado | Institutional Revolutionary Party | 1991–1994 | 55th Congress |
| 1994 | Pascual Juárez Santiago | Institutional Revolutionary Party | 1994–1997 | 56th Congress |
| 1997 | Rosalío Hernández Beltrán | Party of the Democratic Revolution | 1997–2000 | 57th Congress |
| 2000 | Víctor Hugo Círigo Vázquez (Note: Círigo Vázquez took leave from his seat from May 2002 to March 2003.); María Magdalena García González | Party of the Democratic Revolution | 2000–2003 | 58th Congress |
| 2003 | Clara Brugada | Party of the Democratic Revolution | 2003–2006 | 59th Congress |
| 2006 | Miguel Ángel Solares Chávez | Party of the Democratic Revolution | 2006–2009 | 60th Congress |
| 2009 | Luis Felipe Eguía Pérez | Party of the Democratic Revolution | 2009–2012 | 61st Congress |
| 2012 | María de Lourdes Amaya Reyes | Party of the Democratic Revolution | 2012–2015 | 62nd Congress |
| 2015 | Renato Josafat Molina Arias | National Regeneration Movement | 2015–2018 | 63rd Congress |
