= 5th federal electoral district of Zacatecas =

Defunct federal Electoral District of Mexico

Coordinates: 21°24′N 103°07′W

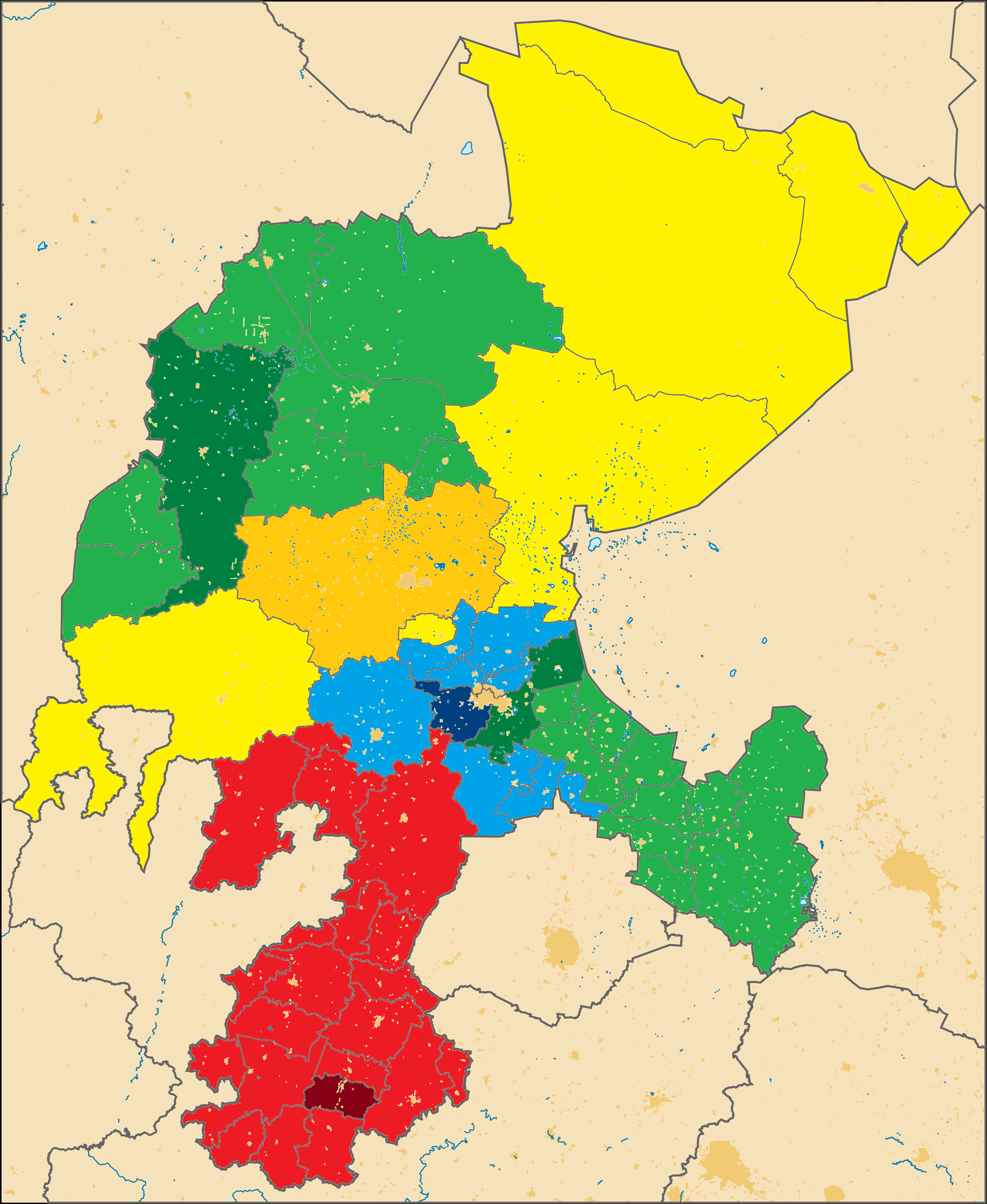
Zacatecas under the 1996–2005 districting plan. The 5th district is shown in red.

The 5th federal electoral district of Zacatecas (Spanish: Distrito electoral federal 05 de Zacatecas) was a federal electoral district of the Mexican state of Zacatecas from 1977 to 2006.

During its existence, the 5th district returned one deputy to the Chamber of Deputies for each of the 51st to 59th Congresses. Votes cast in the district also counted towards the calculation of proportional representation ("plurinominal") deputies elected from the country's electoral regions.

Suspended in 1930, (Note: An amendment to Article 52 of the Constitution in 1928 changed the original provision of "one deputy per 60,000 inhabitants" to "one deputy per 100,000"; as a result, the size of the Chamber of Deputies fell from 281 in the 1928 election to 171 in 1934.) it was re-established as part of the 1977 political reforms and was first contested in the 1979 mid-term election. After electing its final deputy in the 2003 mid-terms, it was dissolved in the Federal Electoral Institute's 2005 redistricting process because the state's population no longer warranted five districts.

== District territory ==
Evolution of electoral district numbers
	1974	1978	1996	2005	2017	2023
Zacatecas	4	5	5	4	4	4
Chamber of Deputies	196	300				

1996–2005

In its final form, the district comprised the municipalities of Apozol, Apulco, Atolinga, Benito Juárez, El Plateado de Joaquín Amaro, Huanusco, Jalpa, Juchipila, Mezquital del Oro, Momax, Monte Escobedo, Moyahua de Estrada, Nochistlán de Mejía, Susticacan, Tabasco, Tepechitlán, Tepetongo, Teúl de González Ortega, Tlaltenango de Sánchez Román, Trinidad García de la Cadena and Villanueva. Its head town (cabecera distrital), where results from individual polling stations were gathered together and tallied, was the city of Juchipila in the extreme south of the state.

1978–1996

The districting scheme in force from 1978 to 1996 was the result of the 1977 electoral reforms, which increased the number of single-member seats in the Chamber of Deputies from 196 to 300. Under that plan, Zacatecas's district allocation rose from four to five. The restored 5th district had its head town at Guadalupe and it covered 15 municipalities.

== Deputies returned to Congress ==
(Mexico) National parties
- Current
- PAN
- PRI
- PT
- PVEM
- MC
- Morena
- PAZ
- Somos MX
- Defunct or local only
- PLM
- PNR
- PRM
- PNM
- PP
- PPS
- PARM
- PFCRN
- CON
- PANAL
- PSD
- PES
- PES
- PRD

Zacatecas's 5th district
Election	Deputy	Party	Term	Legislature
The 5th district was suspended between 1930 and 1979
1979	Aurora Navia Millán	Institutional Revolutionary Party	1979–1982	51st Congress
1982	Ana María Maldonado Pineda	Institutional Revolutionary Party	1982–1985	52nd Congress
1985	José Luis Galaviz Cabral	Institutional Revolutionary Party	1985–1988	53rd Congress
1988	José Manuel Ríos Núñez	Institutional Revolutionary Party	1988–1991	54th Congress
1991	José Escobedo Domínguez	Institutional Revolutionary Party	1991–1994	55th Congress
1994	Pedro López y Macías	Institutional Revolutionary Party	1994–1997	56th Congress
1997	Leobardo Casanova Magallanes	Institutional Revolutionary Party	1997–2000	57th Congress
2000	Silverio López Magallanes	Institutional Revolutionary Party	2000–2003	58th Congress
2003	Antonio Mejía Haro	Party of the Democratic Revolution	2003–2006	59th Congress
