= 2nd federal electoral district of Sinaloa =

Federal electoral district of Mexico

Sinaloa's 2nd
- Electoral district of the Chamber of Deputies of Mexico

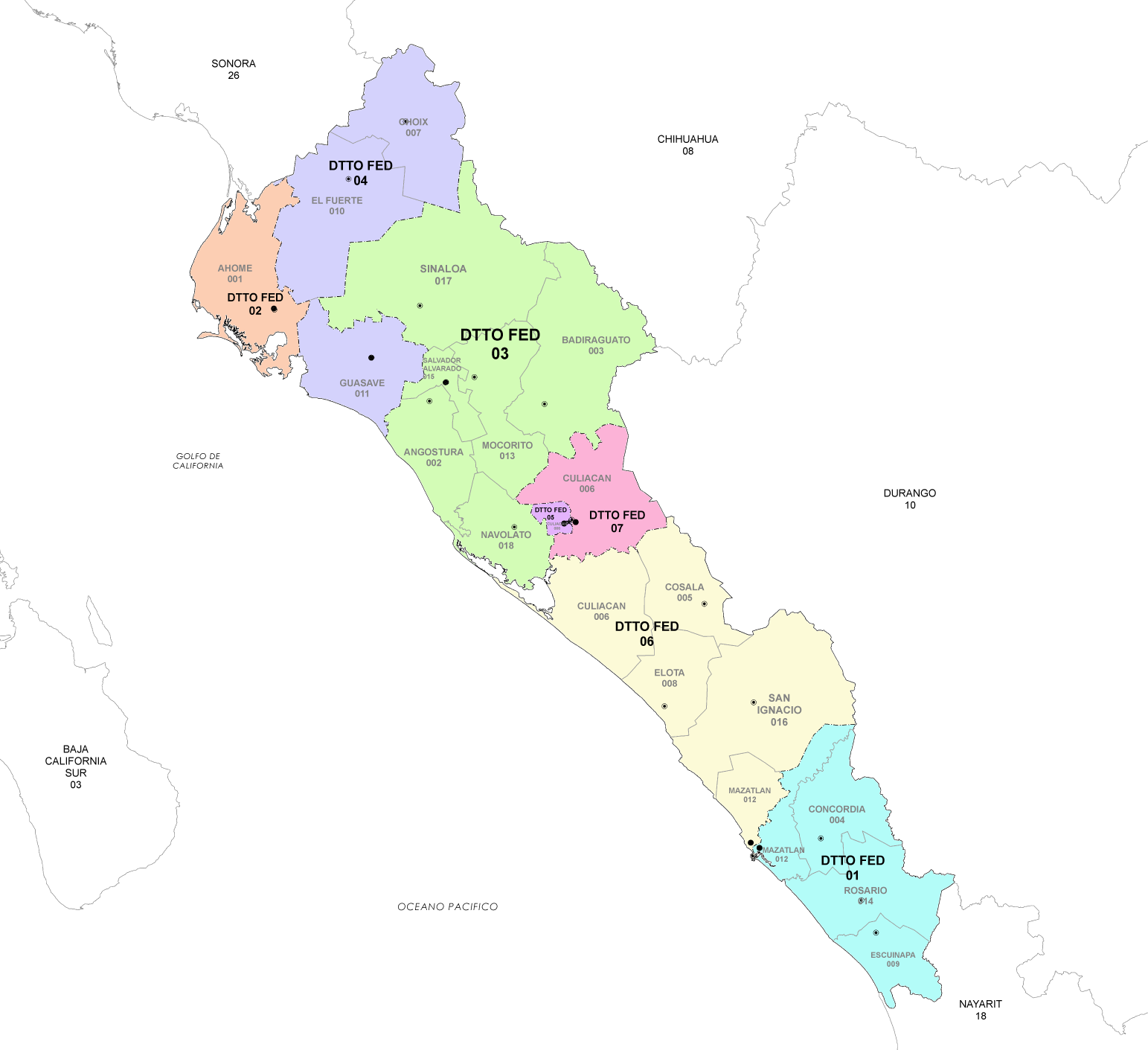
- 2nd district since 1996

Incumbent
- Member: Ana Elizabeth Ayala Leyva
- Party: ▌Morena
- Congress: 66th (2024–2027)

District
- State: Sinaloa
- Head town: Los Mochis
- Coordinates: 25°47′N 108°59′W
- Covers: Ahome
- PR region: First
- Precincts: 482
- Population: 462,209 (2020 census)

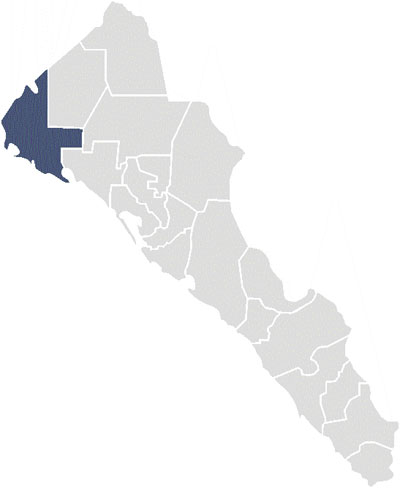
Sinaloa's 2nd district since 1996

The 2nd federal electoral district of Sinaloa (Spanish: Distrito electoral federal 02 de Sinaloa) is one of the 300 electoral districts into which Mexico is divided for elections to the federal Chamber of Deputies and one of seven such districts in the state of Sinaloa.

It elects one deputy to the lower house of Congress for each three-year legislative session by means of the first-past-the-post system. Votes cast in the district also count towards the calculation of proportional representation ("plurinominal") deputies elected from the first region.

The current member for the district, elected in the 2024 general election, is Ana Elizabeth Ayala Leyva of the National Regeneration Movement (Morena).

== District territory ==
Under the 2023 districting plan adopted by the National Electoral Institute (INE), which is to be used for the 2024, 2027 and 2030 federal elections, the second district is located in the north-west of the state and comprises the 482 electoral precincts (secciones electorales) that make up the municipality of Ahome.

The head town (cabecera distrital), where results from individual polling stations are gathered together and tallied, is the city of Los Mochis, the municipal seat of Ahome. The district reported a population of 462,209 in the 2020 census.

== Previous districting schemes ==
Evolution of electoral district numbers
	1974	1978	1996	2005	2017	2023
Sinaloa	5	9	8	8	7	7
Chamber of Deputies	196	300				

1996–2022

Under the 1996, 2005 and 2017 districting plans, the 2nd district had the same configuration as under the 2023 scheme, covering the municipality of Ahome.

1978–1996

The districting scheme in force from 1978 to 1996 was the result of the 1977 electoral reforms, which increased the number of single-member seats in the Chamber of Deputies from 196 to 300. Under that plan, Sinaloa's seat allocation rose from five to nine. The 2nd district comprised the municipality of Guasave.

== Deputies returned to Congress ==
(Mexico) National parties
- Current
- PAN
- PRI
- PT
- PVEM
- MC
- Morena
- PAZ
- Somos
- Defunct or local only
- PLM
- PNR
- PRM
- PNM
- PP
- PPS
- PARM
- PFCRN
- CON
- PANAL
- PSD
- PES
- PES
- PRD

Sinaloa's 2nd district
Election	Deputy	Party	Term	Legislature
1916	Andrés Magallón		1916–1917	Constituent Congress of Querétaro
...
1979	Francisco Alarcón Fregoso	Institutional Revolutionary Party	1979–1982	51st Congress
1982	Homobono Rosas Rodríguez	Institutional Revolutionary Party	1982–1985	52nd Congress
1985	Marco Antonio Espinoza Pablos	Institutional Revolutionary Party	1985–1988	53rd Congress
1988	Benito Juárez Camacho	Institutional Revolutionary Party	1988–1991	54th Congress
1991	Alberto López Vargas	Institutional Revolutionary Party	1991–1994	55th Congress
1994	José Luis Leyson Castro	Institutional Revolutionary Party	1994–1997	56th Congress
1997	Joaquín Montaño Yamuni	National Action Party (Mexico)	1997–2000	57th Congress
2000	Policarpo Infante Fierro	Institutional Revolutionary Party	2000–2003	58th Congress
2003	Esteban Valenzuela García	Institutional Revolutionary Party	2003–2006	59th Congress
2006	Gerardo Vargas Landeros	Institutional Revolutionary Party	2006–2009	60th Congress
2009	Rolando Zubía Rivera	Institutional Revolutionary Party	2009–2012	61st Congress
2012	Gerardo Peña Avilés	National Action Party (Mexico)	2012–2015	62nd Congress
2015	Bernardino Antelo Esper	Institutional Revolutionary Party	2015–2018	63rd Congress
2018	Jaime Montes Salas (Note: Montes Salas resigned his seat on 2 December 2018 and was replaced by his alternate, Ayala Bobadilla.); Carlos Iván Ayala Bobadilla	National Regeneration Movement	2018; 2018–2021	64th Congress
2021	Ana Elizabeth Ayala Leyva	National Regeneration Movement	2021–2024	65th Congress
2024	Ana Elizabeth Ayala Leyva	National Regeneration Movement	2024–2027	66th Congress

== Presidential elections ==
Sinaloa's 2nd district
Election	District won by	Party or coalition	%
2018	Andrés Manuel López Obrador	Juntos Haremos Historia	67.7180
2024	Claudia Sheinbaum Pardo	Sigamos Haciendo Historia	63.7095
