= Enrique Aguilar =

Enrique Aguilar may refer to:

- Enrique Aguilar (wrestler) (born 1969), Mexican wrestler
- Enrique Aguilar Borrego (1948-2009), Mexican trade unionist and politician
- Enrique Aguilar (footballer) (born 2007), Swiss footballer
