= 28th federal electoral district of the Federal District =

Defunct federal electoral district of Mexico

Coordinates: 19°28′N 99°11′W

The 28th federal electoral district of the Federal District (Spanish: Distrito electoral federal 28 del Distrito Federal) is a defunct federal electoral district of Mexico. Occupying a portion of what is today Mexico City, it was in existence from 1979 to 2005.

During that time, it returned one deputy to the Chamber of Deputies for each three-year legislative session by means of the first-past-the-post system, electing its first in the 1979 mid-term election and its last in the 2003 mid-terms. Votes cast in the district also counted towards the calculation of proportional representation ("plurinominal") deputies elected from the country's electoral regions.

The 28th, 29th and 30th districts were abolished by the Federal Electoral Institute (IFE) in its 2005 redistricting process because the capital's population no longer warranted that number of seats in Congress. They were not contested in the 2006 general election.

== District territory ==
Evolution of electoral district numbers
	1974	1978	1996	2005	2017	2023
Mexico City (Federal District)	27	40	30	27	24	22
Chamber of Deputies	196	300				

1996–2005

In its final form, when the capital comprised 30 districts, the 28th was located in the south-east of the city, covering the whole of the borough of Xochimilco.

1978–1996

The districting scheme in force from 1978 to 1996 was the result of the 1977 electoral reforms, which increased the number of single-member seats in the Chamber of Deputies from 196 to 300. Under that plan, the Federal District's seat allocation rose from 27 to 40. The 28th district covered portions of the boroughs of Azcapotzalco and Miguel Hidalgo in the north of the city.

== Deputies returned to Congress ==
(Mexico) National parties
- Current
- PAN
- PRI
- PT
- PVEM
- MC
- Morena
- Defunct or local only
- PLM
- PNR
- PRM
- PNM
- PP
- PPS
- PARM
- PFCRN
- Convergencia
- PANAL
- PSD
- PES
- PES
- PRD

Federal District's 28th district
Election	Deputy	Party	Term	Legislature
1979	Carlos Romero Deschamps	Institutional Revolutionary Party	1979–1982	51st Congress
1982	Antonio Osorio de León	Institutional Revolutionary Party	1982–1985	52nd Congress
1985	Agustín Bernal Villanueva	Institutional Revolutionary Party	1985–1988	53rd Congress
1988	Adolfo Barrientos Parra	Institutional Revolutionary Party	1988–1991	54th Congress
1991	Luis Salgado Beltrán	Institutional Revolutionary Party	1991–1994	55th Congress
1994	Carlos Aceves del Olmo	Institutional Revolutionary Party	1994–1997	56th Congress
1997	Miguel Ángel Solares Chávez	Party of the Democratic Revolution	1997–2000	57th Congress
2000	Elías Martínez Rufino	Party of the Democratic Revolution	2000–2003	58th Congress
2003	Nancy Cárdenas Sánchez	Party of the Democratic Revolution	2003–2006	59th Congress
