= 6th federal electoral district of Puebla =

Federal electoral district of Mexico

Puebla's 6th
- Electoral district of the Chamber of Deputies of Mexico

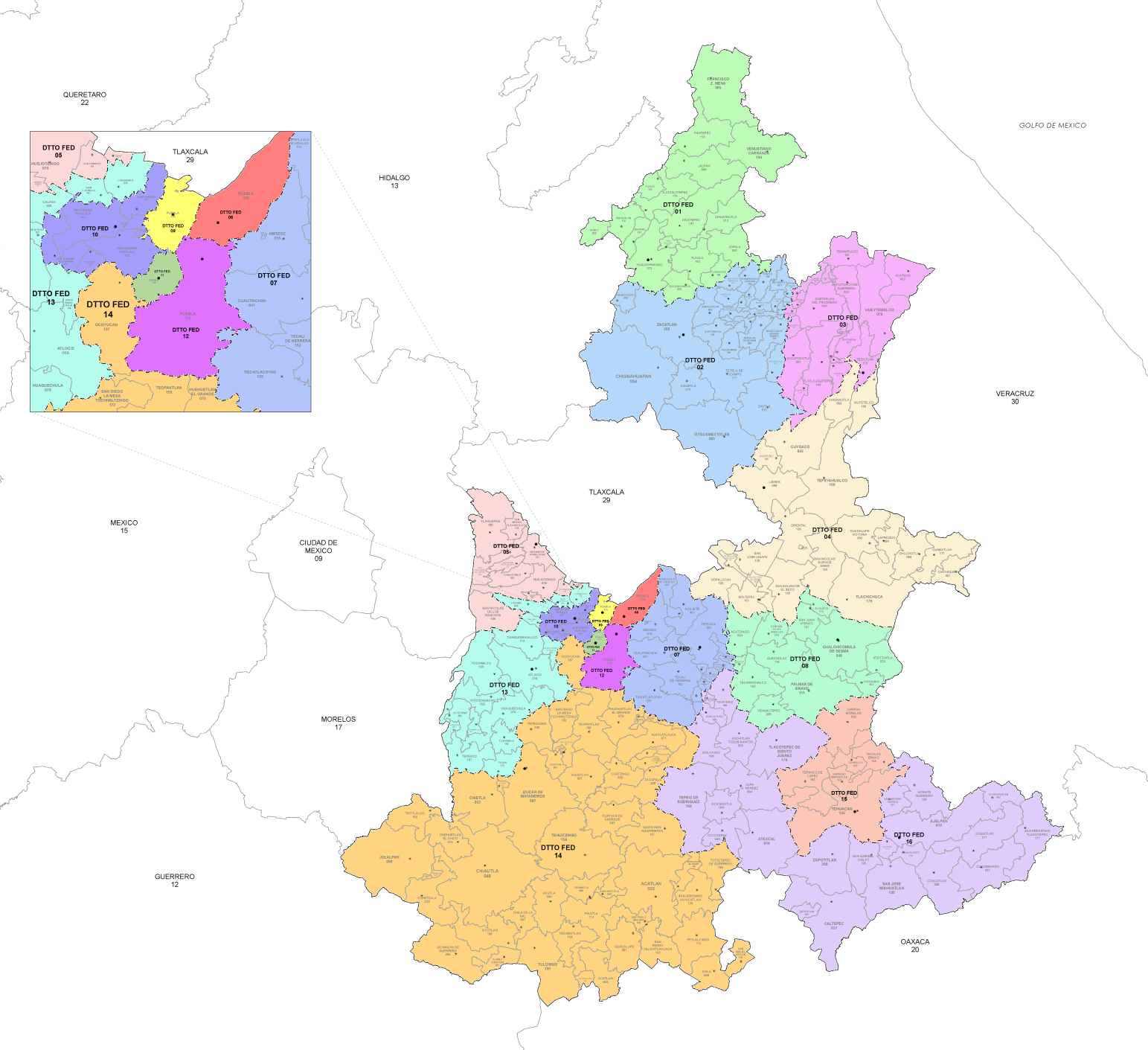
- 6th district since 2023

Incumbent
- Member: Alejandro Carvajal Hidalgo
- Party: ▌Morena
- Congress: 66th (2024–2027)

District
- State: Puebla
- Head town: Puebla de Zaragoza
- Coordinates: 19°02′N 98°11′W
- Covers: Municipality of Puebla (part)
- PR region: Fourth
- Precincts: 145
- Population: 420,886 (2020 census)

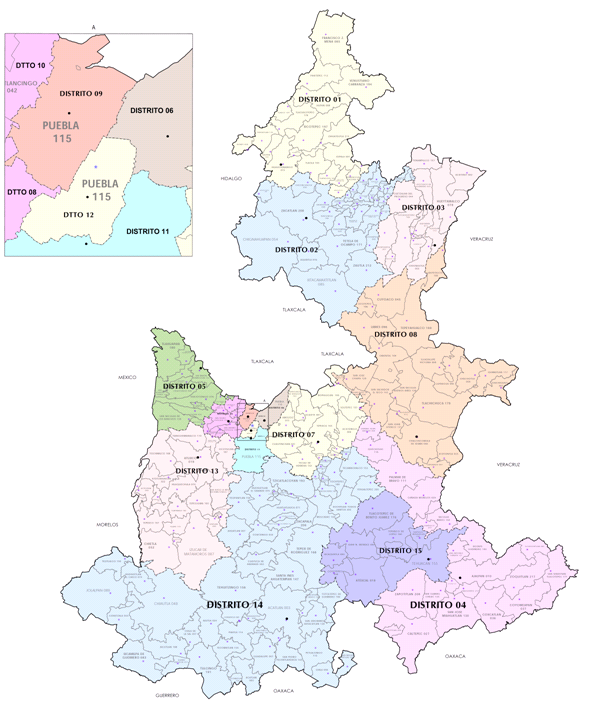
Puebla's districts in 2017–2022

The 6th federal electoral district of Puebla (Spanish: Distrito electoral federal 06 de Puebla) is one of the 300 electoral districts into which Mexico is divided for elections to the federal Chamber of Deputies and one of 16 such districts in the state of Puebla.

It elects one deputy to the lower house of Congress for each three-year legislative session by means of the first-past-the-post system. Votes cast in the district also count towards the calculation of proportional representation ("plurinominal") deputies elected from the fourth region.

The current member for the district, re-elected in the 2024 general election, is Alejandro Carvajal Hidalgo of the National Regeneration Movement (Morena).

== District territory ==
Under the 2023 districting plan adopted by the National Electoral Institute (INE), which is to be used for the 2024, 2027 and 2030 federal elections, Puebla's congressional seat allocation rose from 15 to 16. The 6th district covers 145 electoral precincts (secciones electorales) in the municipality of Puebla. (Note: The 7th, 9th, 11th and 12th districts cover the remainder of the municipality.)

The head town (cabecera distrital), where results from individual polling stations are gathered together and tallied, is the state capital, the city of Puebla. The district reported a population of 420,886 in the 2020 census.

== Previous districting schemes ==
Evolution of electoral district numbers
	1974	1978	1996	2005	2017	2023
Puebla	10	14	15	16	15	16
Chamber of Deputies	196	300				

2017–2022

From 2017 to 2022, when Puebla was assigned 15 congressional seats, the district's head town was the state capital and it covered 127 sections in the municipality.

2005–2017

Under the 2005 plan, the district was one of 16 in Puebla. Its head town was the city of Puebla and it covered 166 sections in the municipality.

1996–2005

Between 1996 and 2005, Puebla had 15 districts. The 6th covered 166 sections in the municipality of Puebla, with the state capital serving as its head town.

1978–1996

The districting scheme in force from 1978 to 1996 was the result of the 1977 electoral reforms, which increased the number of single-member seats in the Chamber of Deputies from 196 to 300. Under that plan, Puebla's seat allocation rose from 10 to 14. The 6th district's head town was at Tehuacán and it covered 14 municipalities in the east of the state.

== Deputies returned to Congress ==
(Mexico) National parties
- Current
- PAN
- PRI
- PT
- PVEM
- MC
- Morena
- PAZ
- Somos
- Defunct or local only
- PLM
- PNR
- PRM
- PNM
- PP
- PPS
- PARM
- PFCRN
- CON
- PANAL
- PSD
- PES
- PES
- PRD

Puebla's 6th district
Election	Deputy	Party	Term	Legislature
1916	Froilán C. Manjarrez		1916–1917	Constituent Congress of Querétaro
...
1979	Amador Hernández González	Institutional Revolutionary Party	1979–1982	51st Congress
1982	Wulfrano Ascensión Bravo	Institutional Revolutionary Party	1982–1985	52nd Congress
1985	Miguel Romero Sánchez	Institutional Revolutionary Party	1985–1988	53rd Congress
1988	Willebaldo García de la Cadena Romero	Institutional Revolutionary Party	1988–1991	54th Congress
1991	Marco Antonio Haddad Yunes	Institutional Revolutionary Party	1991–1994	55th Congress
1994	Édgar Román Benítez Gálvez	Institutional Revolutionary Party	1994–1997	56th Congress
1997	Omar Álvarez Arronte	Institutional Revolutionary Party	1997–2000	57th Congress
2000	Erika Elizabeth Spezia Maldonado	Ecologist Green Party of Mexico	2000–2003	58th Congress
2003	José Roberto Ruiz Esparza Oruña (Note: Ruiz Esparza resigned from the PAN on 7 September 2004 and declared himself independent.)	National Action Party (Mexico) Independent politician	2003–2006	59th Congress
2006	Arturo Flores Grande	National Action Party (Mexico)	2006–2009	60th Congress
2009	Francisco Ramos Montaño	Institutional Revolutionary Party	2009–2012	61st Congress
2012	José Enrique Doger Guerrero	Institutional Revolutionary Party	2012–2015	62nd Congress
2015	Xitlalic Ceja García	Institutional Revolutionary Party	2015–2018	63rd Congress
2018	Alejandro Carvajal Hidalgo	National Regeneration Movement	2018–2021	64th Congress
2021	Alejandro Carvajal Hidalgo	National Regeneration Movement	2021–2024	65th Congress
2024	Alejandro Carvajal Hidalgo	National Regeneration Movement	2024–2027	66th Congress

== Presidential elections ==
Puebla's 6th district
Election	District won by	Party or coalition	%
2018	Andrés Manuel López Obrador	Juntos Haremos Historia	65.7172
2024	Claudia Sheinbaum Pardo	Sigamos Haciendo Historia	64.7311
