= Camberos =

Camberos is a surname. Notable people with the surname include:

- Alexandro Martínez Camberos (1916–1999), Mexican poet, writer, lawyer, and judge
- Francisco Ávila Camberos (born 1948), Mexican politician
- Hugo Camberos (born 2007), Mexican footballer
- Miguel Camberos (1905–1992), Mexican athlete javelin thrower
- Scarlett Camberos (born 2000), Mexican footballer
