= Carlos Toledo =

Carlos Toledo may refer to:

- Carlos Toledo Plata (1932–1984), Colombian politician
- Carlos Altamirano Toledo (born 1946), Mexican politician
- Carlos Humberto Toledo (1919–1980), Guatemalan footballer
- Carlos Raymundo Toledo (born 1955), Mexican politician
