= Juan Cano Cortezano =

Mexican politician

- Born: 24 November 1961 (age 64); Tlaxcala, Mexico
- Occupation: Politician
- Political party: PAN

Juan de la Cruz Alberto Cano Cortezano (born 24 November 1961) is a Mexican politician from the National Action Party. From 2000 to 2003 he served as Deputy of the LVIII Legislature of the Mexican Congress representing Tlaxcala.
