= Luis Ariel Canto García =

Mexican politician

- Born: 29 August 1965 (age 60); Yucatán, Mexico
- Occupation: Politician
- Political party: PAN

Luis Ariel Canto García (born 29 August 1965) is a Mexican politician from the National Action Party. From 2000 to 2003 he served as Deputy of the LVIII Legislature of the Mexican Congress representing Veracruz.
