= Miguel Ángel Solares Chávez =

Mexican politician

- Born: 29 September 1945 (age 81); Xochimilco, Federal District, Mexico
- Education: Benemérita Escuela Nacional de Maestros
- Occupation: Politician
- Political party: PRDMORENA

Miguel Ángel Solares Chávez (born 29 September 1945) is a Mexican politician affiliated with the National Regeneration Movement (Morena) who previously belonged to the now defunct Party of the Democratic Revolution (PRD).

In the 1997 mid-terms he was elected to the Chamber of Deputies for the 28th district of the Federal District on the PRD ticket. He returned to Congress in the 2006 general election when he was elected to the Chamber of Deputies for the Federal District's 25th district for the PRD.
