= José Villarreal Gutiérrez =

Mexican politician

- Born: Nuevo León, Mexico
- Occupation: Politician
- Political party: PRI

José Guadalupe Villarreal Gutiérrez is a Mexican politician from the Institutional Revolutionary Party. From 2002 to 2003 he served as Deputy of the LVIII Legislature of the Mexican Congress representing Nuevo León.
