= Rolando Zubía Rivera =

Mexican politician

- Born: 7 November 1954 (age 71); Sinaloa, Mexico
- Occupation: Politician
- Political party: PRI

Rolando Zubía Rivera (born 11 November 1954) is a Mexican politician from the Institutional Revolutionary Party. In the 2009 mid-terms he was elected to the Chamber of Deputies to represent Sinaloa's 2nd district during the 61st session of Congress.
