= Juana Barrera Amezcua =

Mexican politician

- Born: 16 May 1961 (age 65); Cuernavaca, Morelos, Mexico
- Occupation: Politician
- Political party: PAN

Juana Barrera Amezcua (born 16 May 1961) is a Mexican politician from the National Action Party. In 2003 she served as Deputy of the LVIII Legislature of the Mexican Congress representing Morelos.
