= Esteban Valenzuela García =

Mexican politician

- Born: 2 September 1948 (age 77); Sinaloa, Mexico
- Occupation: Politician
- Political party: PRI

Esteban Valenzuela García (born 2 September 1948) is a Mexican politician affiliated with the Institutional Revolutionary Party (PRI).

Valenzuela García was municipal president of Ahome from 1999 to 2001. In the 2003 mid-terms he was elected to the Chamber of Deputies to represent Sinaloa's 2nd district during the 59th session of Congress.
