= Carlos Humberto Aceves =

Mexican politician and union leader

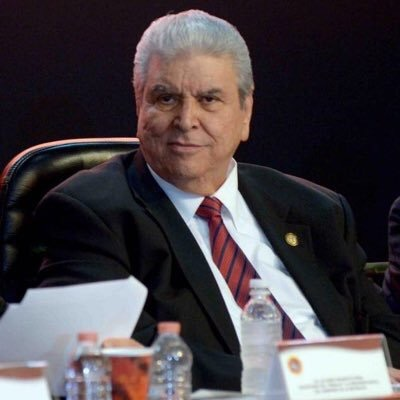
- Born: 5 November 1940 (age 85); Federal District, Mexico
- Occupation: General Secretary CTM
- Political party: PRI
- Spouse: Lucía Nieto

Carlos Humberto Aceves del Olmo (born 5 November 1940) is a Mexican union leader and politician affiliated with the Institutional Revolutionary Party (PRI). Since 2016 he is the General Secretary of the Confederation of Mexican Workers (Confederación de Trabajadores de México, CTM), representing the largest number of unionized workers in Mexico. He is also the President of the Congreso del Trabajo, an organization that represents over 40 union organizations.

He has served three terms in the Chamber of Deputies: 1994–1997, for Mexico City's 28th district; 2000–2003, as a plurinominal deputy; and 2012–2015, as a plurinominal deputy. He was also a national-list Senator during the 60th and 61st sessions of Congress (2006–2012).
