= Alejandro Gutiérrez Gutiérrez =

Mexican politician

- Born: 16 November 1956 (age 69); Saltillo, Coahuila, Mexico
- Education: Universidad Anáhuac
- Occupation: Politician
- Political party: PRI

Alejandro Gutiérrez Gutiérrez (born 16 November 1956) is a Mexican politician affiliated with the Institutional Revolutionary Party (PRI). He was a member of the 50th legislature of the Congress of Coahuila. He was a deputy in the 56th (1994–1997) legislature of the federal Congress, representing Coahuila's first district, and a senator for Coahuila in the 58th (2000–2003) and 59th (2003–2006) legislatures.
