= Erika Spezia Maldonado =

Mexican politician

- Born: 26 December 1975 (age 50); Puebla, Mexico
- Occupation: Politician
- Political party: PVEM

Erika Elizabeth Spezia Maldonado (born 26 December 1975) is a Mexican politician from the Ecologist Green Party of Mexico (PVEM). In the 2000 general election she was elected to the Chamber of Deputies to represent Puebla's 6th district during the 58th session of Congress.
