= María Teresa Campoy Ruy =

Mexican politician (born 1959)

- Born: 15 October 1959 (age 66); Nuevo León, Mexico
- Occupation: Politician
- Political party: PVEM

María Teresa Campoy Ruy Sánchez (born 15 October 1959) is a Mexican politician from the Ecologist Green Party of Mexico. From 2000 to 2003 she served as Deputy of the LVIII Legislature of the Mexican Congress representing Nuevo León.
