= Norma Reyes Terán =

Mexican politician

- Born: 8 August 1955 (age 71); Santa María Mixtequilla, Oaxaca, Mexico
- Education: UABJO
- Occupation: Politician
- Political party: PRD

Norma Reyes Terán (born 8 August 1955) is a Mexican politician from the Party of the Democratic Revolution. From 2000 to 2003 he served as Deputy of the LVIII Legislature of the Mexican Congress representing Oaxaca.
