= Rubén Aguirre Ponce =

Mexican politician from the Party of the Democratic Revolution

- Born: 9 August 1944 (age 81); Guerrero, Mexico
- Occupation: Politician
- Political party: Democratic Revolution

Rubén Aguirre Ponce (born 9 August 1944) is a Mexican politician from the Party of the Democratic Revolution. From 2000 to 2003 he served as Deputy of the LVIII Legislature of the Mexican Congress representing Guerrero.
