= Miguel Castro Sánchez =

Mexican politician

- Born: 26 February 1942 (age 84); Tepic, Nayarit, Mexico
- Died: 27 Diciembre 2022
- Education: UAN
- Occupation: Politician
- Political party: PRI

Miguel Castro Sánchez (born 26 February 1942) is a Mexican politician from the Institutional Revolutionary Party. From 2000 to 2003 he served as Deputy of the LVIII Legislature of the Mexican Congress representing Nayarit, and previously served in the Congress of Nayarit.
