= Maricruz Montelongo Gordillo =

Mexican politician

- Born: 22 October 1963 (age 62); Mexico City, Mexico
- Occupation: Politician
- Political party: PRI
- Relatives: Elba Esther Gordillo (mother)

Maricruz Montelongo Gordillo (born 22 October 1963) is a Mexican politician from the Institutional Revolutionary Party. From 2000 to 2003 she served as Deputy of the LVIII Legislature of the Mexican Congress representing the Federal District.
