= Hugo Camacho Galván =

Mexican politician

- Born: 23 September 1959 (age 66); Gómez Palacio, Durango, Mexico
- Occupation: Politician
- Political party: PAN

Hugo Camacho Galván (born 23 September 1959) is a Mexican politician from the National Action Party. From 2000 to 2003 he served as Deputy of the LVIII Legislature of the Mexican Congress representing Nuevo León.
