= Joaquín Montaño Yamuni =

Mexican politician (born 1952)

- Born: 24 August 1952 (age 73); Los Mochis, Sinaloa, Mexico
- Occupation: Politician
- Political party: PAN

Joaquín Montaño Yamuni (born 24 August 1952) is a Mexican politician formerly affiliated with the National Action Party (PAN).

In the 1997 mid-terms he was elected to the Chamber of Deputies for the PAN to represent Sinaloa's 2nd district during the 57th session of Congress. At the end of his term in the lower house, he was elected to the Senate for Sinaloa in the 2000 general election, where he served during the 58th and 59th Congresses.
