= Silverio López Magallanes =

Mexican politician

- Born: 24 July 1957 (age 69); Tepechitlán, Zacatecas, Mexico
- Education: Autonomous University of Zacatecas
- Occupation: Politician
- Political party: PRI

Silverio López Magallanes (born 24 July 1957) is a Mexican politician from the Institutional Revolutionary Party (PRI). From 2000 to 2003 he served as a federal deputy during the 58th Congress, representing the fifth district of Zacatecas.
