= Arturo Flores Grande =

Mexican politician

- Born: 1 September 1965 (age 60); Puebla, Mexico
- Occupation: Politician
- Political party: PAN

Arturo Flores Grande (born 1 September 1965) is a Mexican politician affiliated with the National Action Party (PAN). In the 2006 general election he was elected to the Chamber of Deputies to represent Puebla's 6th district during the 60th session of Congress.
