= Brenda María Alvarado Sánchez =

Mexican politician

- Born: 16 February 1970 (age 56); Federal District, Mexico
- Occupation: Deputy
- Political party: PRI

Brenda María Izontli Alvarado Sánchez (born 16 February 1970) is a Mexican politician affiliated with the Institutional Revolutionary Party (PRI). She was born in Mexico City and holds a BA in law from the National Autonomous University of Mexico (UNAM) and a master's in public administration from the Universidad Anáhuac.

In 2012–2015 she served as a federal deputy in the 62nd Congress, representing the State of Mexico's eleventh district (Ecatepec) for the PRI.

Alvarado unsuccessfully sought election as one of the State of Mexico's senators in the 2024 Senate election, occupying the second place on the Fuerza y Corazón por México coalition's two-name formula.
