= Gustavo Buenrostro Díaz =

Mexican politician (born 1965)

- Born: 29 November 1965 (age 60); Querétaro, Mexico
- Occupation: Politician
- Political party: PAN

Gustavo César Jesús Buenrostro Díaz (born 29 November 1965) is a Mexican politician from the National Action Party. From 2000 to 2003, he served as Deputy of the LVIII Legislature of the Mexican Congress representing Querétaro.
