= Antonio Mejía Haro =

Mexican politician

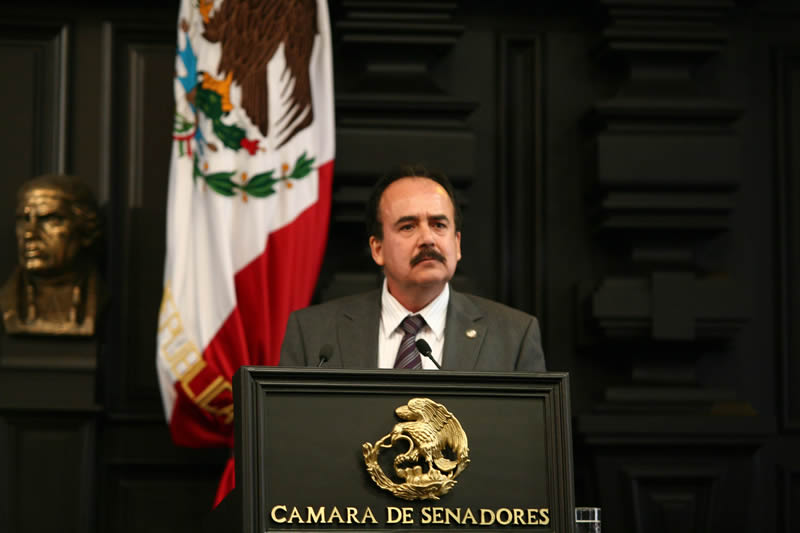
- Born: 10 June 1957 (age 69); El Remolino, Zacatecas, Mexico
- Education: UAZ; UAAAN
- Occupations: Deputy and Senator
- Political party: PRD

Antonio Mejía Haro (born 10 June 1957) is a Mexican politician affiliated with the Party of the Democratic Revolution (PRD). In the 2006 general election he was elected to the Senate, where he represented Zacatecas for the 60th and 61st sessions of Congress. He had previously served as a federal deputy in the 59th Congress (2003–2006), representing the fifth district of Zacatecas, and as a local deputy in the 16th session of the Congress of Zacatecas.
