= Luis Felipe Eguía =

Mexican politician

- Born: 7 November 1969 (age 56); Mexico City, Mexico
- Occupation: Politician
- Political party: PRD

Luis Felipe Eguía Pérez (born 7 November 1969) is a Mexican politician from the Party of the Democratic Revolution (PRD). In the 2009 mid-terms he was elected to the Chamber of Deputies to represent the 25th district of the Federal District during the 61st session of Congress.
