= María de Lourdes Amaya =

Mexican politician

- Born: 11 February 1980 (age 46); Xochimilco, Federal District, Mexico
- Occupation: Politician
- Political party: PRD

María de Lourdes Amaya Reyes (Note: In this Mexican name, the surname is Amaya and the second or maternal family name is Reyes.) (born 11 February 1980) is a Mexican politician affiliated with the Party of the Democratic Revolution (PRD). In the 2012 general election she was elected to the Chamber of Deputies to represent the 25th district of the Federal District during the 62nd session of Congress.
