= Lorena Beaurregard =

Mexican politician

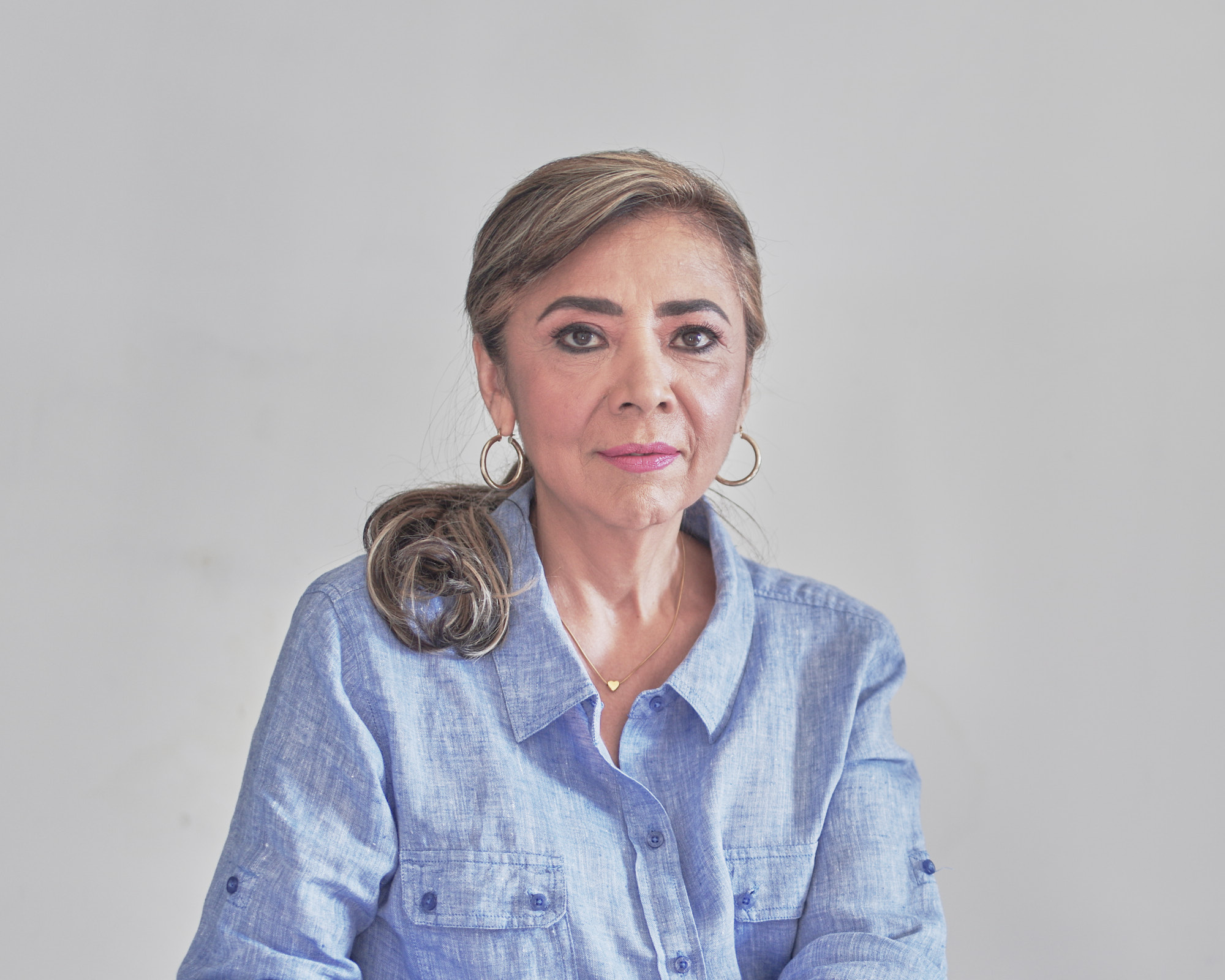
- Beaurregard de los Santos in 2023
- Born: 8 September 1962 (age 63); Macuspana, Tabasco, Mexico
- Occupation: Politician
- Political party: PRI

Lorena Beaurregard de los Santos (born 8 September 1962) is a Mexican politician from the Institutional Revolutionary Party (PRI). From 2000 to 2003 she served as a plurinominal deputy in the 58th Congress, representing the third electoral region, which includes her home state of Tabasco.

Beaurregard de los Santos contended for the governorship of Tabasco in the June 2024 state elections, backed by a coalition comprising the PRI and the National Action Party (PAN). She placed fourth in a field of four, with 5.31% of the vote.
