= Ramón Ponce Contreras =

Mexican politician

- Born: 25 February 1956 (age 70); Apatzingán, Michoacán, Mexico
- Occupation: Politician
- Political party: PAN

Ramón Ponce Contreras (born 25 February 1956) is a Mexican politician from the National Action Party. From 2000 to 2003 he served as Deputy of the LVIII Legislature of the Mexican Congress representing Michoacán.
