= Ranulfo Márquez Hernández =

Mexican politician

- Born: 27 May 1951 (age 74); Minatitlán, Veracruz, Mexico
- Occupation: Politician
- Political party: PRI

Ranulfo Márquez Hernández (born 27 May 1951) is a Mexican politician from the Institutional Revolutionary Party. From 2000 to 2003 he served as Deputy of the LVIII Legislature of the Mexican Congress representing Veracruz.
