= Zinthia Benavides =

Mexican politician (born 1969)

- Born: 31 December 1969 (age 56); Nuevo León, Mexico
- Education: Universidad Regiomontana
- Occupation: Politician
- Political party: PAN

Zinthia de los Ángeles Benavides Hernández (born 31 December 1969) is a Mexican politician from the National Action Party. In 2003 she served as Deputy of the LVIII Legislature of the Mexican Congress representing Nuevo León.
