= Jorge Chávez Presa =

Mexican economist

Jorge A. Chávez Presa
- Born: 18 July 1959 (age 65); Mexico City, Mexico
- Education: Mexico Autonomous Institute of Technology, bachelor in economics. The Ohio State University, Master in Arts and Ph.D.
- Occupation: Economist
- Title: Ph.D.

Jorge Alejandro Chávez Presa (born 18 July 1959) is a Mexican economist graduated from Instituto Tecnológico Autónomo de México . From 2019 to 2021 he represented Mexico, Spain, Venezuela, Costa Rica, El Salvador, Honduras and Nicaragua as Executive Director in IBRD, IFC, IDA and MIGA ( World Bank Group). From 2000 to 2003 he served as Deputy of the LVIII Legislature of the Mexican Congress representing the Federal District. He served as Deputy Secretary of Energy Policy (1998-2000) in the Secretariat of Energy. He also served as the first Head of the Budget Policy Unit (1995-1998) and Director General of Budget Policy (1991-1995) in the Secretariat of Finance and Public Credit. From 2016 to 2018 he was the Chief Financial Officer of Infonavit, Latin America’s largest savings and mortgage fund. He is recognized for bringing transparency and accountability to Mexico’s Federal Budget due to the introduction of the New Programmatic Structure and the System of Performance Evaluation. In 2018 Mundo Ejecutivo recognized him among the 25 best CFOs. He is the author of “Para Recobrar la Confianza en el Gobierno” (Recovering Trust in Government).
