= Guadalupe Flores Salazar =

Mexican politician

- Born: 3 November 1971 (age 54); Federal District, Mexico
- Education: UAM; UNAM
- Occupation: Politician
- Political party: PRD

Guadalupe Socorro Flores Salazar (born 3 November 1971) is a Mexican politician affiliated with the Party of the Democratic Revolution (PRD). She was elected to the Chamber of Deputies for the Federal District's 27th electoral district in both the 2006 general election and 2012 general elections.
