= Gerardo Peña Avilés =

Mexican politician

- Born: 27 September 1964 (age 61); Sinaloa, Mexico
- Occupation: Politician
- Political party: PAN

Gerardo Peña Avilés (born 27 September 1964) is a Mexican politician affiliated with the National Action Party (PAN). In the 2012 general election he was elected to the Chamber of Deputies to represent Sinaloa's 2nd district during the 62nd session of Congress.
