= Intersindical-CSC =

Pro-independence trade union in Catalonia, Spain

- Intersindical – Confederació Sindical Catalana
- Founded: 1990
- Headquarters: Barcelona, Catalonia
- Location: Catalonia (Spain)
- Members: 4500 (2017)
- Key people: Carles Sastre i Benlliure, general secretary
- Affiliations: WFTU
- Website: www.intersindical-csc.cat

The Intersindical – Confederació Sindical Catalana (or simply Intersindical-CSC) is an independentist trade union from Catalonia, founded in 1990. It is a member of the World Federation of Trade Unions, the second most important international organization of trade unions. At the same time, it is the founder and member of the Council of the Platform of Trade Unions of Nations Without a State. On the other hand, it is an active member of the Federation of Internationally Recognized Catalan Organizations (FOCIR) and participates in several social platforms such as Som Escola, Catalan Board for Peace and Human Rights in Colombia or International Action for Peace. Since 6 April 2013, its Secretary General is Carles Sastre i Benlliure.

== History ==
In 1985 the Confederació Sindical de Treballadors de Catalunya (CSTC) joined two smaller organizations and the Catalan Trade Union Confederation (CSC) was created. In 1987–88 the general secretary was Jordi Fayos i López. The union entered into crisis in 1986. In 1987 the CSTC was formally dissolved but a part of its militancy, located on the far left, founded the Coordinadora Obrera Sindical (COS). Between 1987 and 1989, there were various divisions that passed mainly to Workers' Commissions. The 1990 union was renamed Intersindical-CSC.

Since 2004, the union was redirected towards left-wing and pro-independence positions. Between 1998 and 2013, the secretary was Isabel Pallarès i Roqué, and as of 6 April, she was charged until now secretary of union action Carles Sastre i Benlliure.

On 8 November 2017, the Intersindical-CSC organized, among other pro-independence organizations, a general strike.

== Structure ==
The Intersindical-CSC is a pro-independence and class-based trade union that groups all the productive sectors. It is structured in federations and areas: the Federation of Services, the Federation of Public Administrations, the Federation of Industry, the Federation of Education, the Area of Health, the Youth Space and the Area of International Solidarity.
