= Martín Solís Alatorre =

Mexican politician

- Born: 30 January 1959 (age 67); State of Mexico, Mexico
- Occupation: Politician
- Political party: PAN

Martín Hugo Solís Alatorre (born 30 January 1959) is a Mexican politician from the National Action Party (PAN). In the 2000 general election he was elected to the Chamber of Deputies to represent the State of Mexico's 11th district during the 58th session of Congress.
