= Cecilia Laviada Hernández =

Mexican politician

- Born: Mexico City, Mexico
- Occupation: Politician
- Political party: PAN

Cecilia Laviada Hernández is a Mexican politician from the National Action Party. In 2003 she served as Deputy of the LVIII Legislature of the Mexican Congress representing the Federal District.
