= Francisco Jurado Contreras =

Mexican politician

- Born: 11 July 1955 (age 70); Hidalgo del Parral, Chihuahua, Mexico
- Occupation: Politician
- Political party: PAN

Francisco Ezequiel Jurado Contreras (born 11 July 1955) is a Mexican politician from the National Action Party. From 2000 to 2003 he served as Deputy of the LVIII Legislature of the Mexican Congress representing Chihuahua.
