= Delfino Garcés =

Mexican politician

- Born: 9 November 1953 (age 72); Mexico City, Mexico
- Occupation: Politician
- Political party: PRD

José Delfino Garcés Martínez (born 9 November 1953) is a Mexican politician from the Party of the Democratic Revolution (PRD). In the 2000 general election he was elected to the Chamber of Deputies to represent the Federal District's 27th electoral district during the 58th session of Congress.
