= José Luis Cabrera Padilla =

Mexican politician

- Born: 14 January 1956 (age 70); Mexico City, Mexico
- Occupation: Politician
- Political party: PRD

José Luis Cabrera Padilla (born 14 January 1956) is a Mexican politician affiliated with the Party of the Democratic Revolution (PRD). In the 2003 mid-terms he was elected to the Chamber of Deputies to represent the Federal District's 27th electoral district during the 59th session of Congress. After that, he served as Jefe Delegacional (mayor) of the Mexico City borough of Milpa Alta from 2006 to 2009.
