= Francisco Salvador López Brito =

Mexican politician

- Born: 4 October 1949 (age 76); Sinaloa, Mexico
- Occupation: Senator
- Political party: PAN

Francisco Salvador López Brito (born 4 October 1949) is a Mexican politician affiliated with the PAN. He currently serves as Senator of the LXII Legislature of the Mexican Congress representing Sinaloa. He also served as Deputy during the LVI Legislature.
