= Roberto Bueno Campos =

Mexican politician

- Born: 21 January 1946 (age 80); Veracruz, Mexico
- Occupation: Politician
- Political party: PAN

Roberto Eugenio Bueno Campos (born 21 January 1946) is a Mexican politician from the National Action Party. From 2000 to 2003 he served as Deputy of the LVIII Legislature of the Mexican Congress representing Veracruz.

== See also ==
- Veracruz state election, 1994

Preceded by Efrén López Meza	Municipal President of Veracruz; 1994 - 1997	Succeeded by Francisco Ávila Camberos
