= Gerardo Vargas Landeros =

Mexican businessman and politician

Gerardo Octavio Vargas Landeros
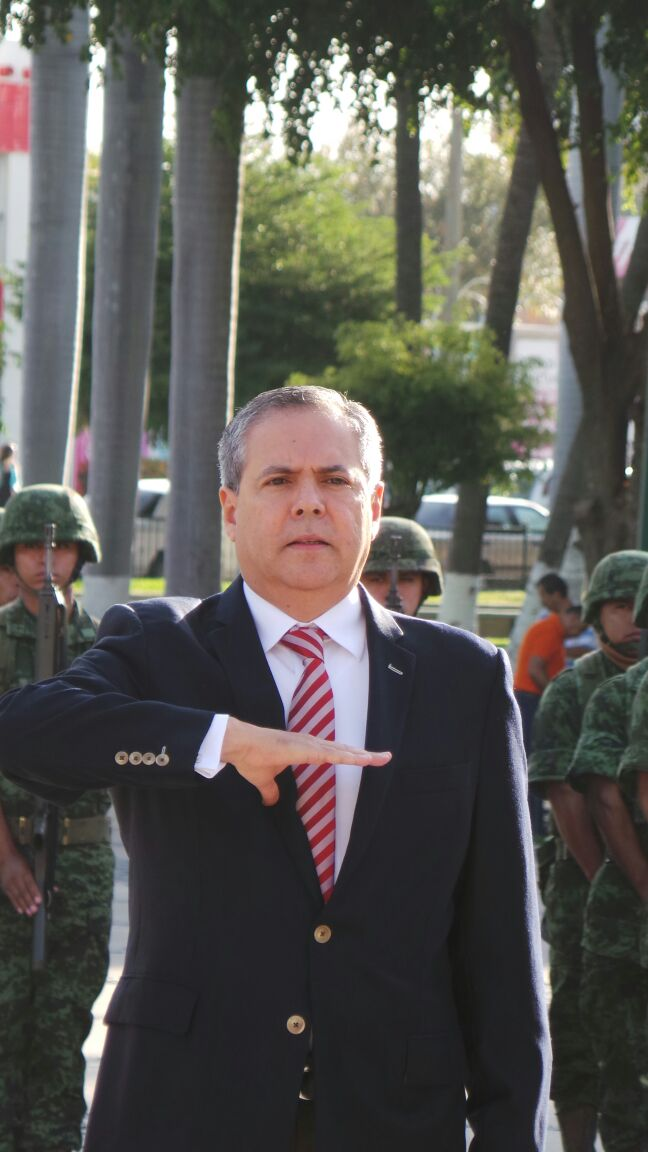
- Gerardo Octavio Vargas Landeros
- Born: Gerardo Octavio Vargas Landeros; 21 October 1962 (age 63); Sonora, Mexico
- Status: Married
- Other name: Gerardo Vargas Landeros
- Education: Business Administration
- Alma mater: Universidad Iberoamericana
- Occupations: Politician, businessman
- Title: Vice Governor of Sinaloa PAN-PRD
- Political party: Redes Sociales Progresistas

Gerardo Octavio Vargas Landeros (born 21 October 1962) is a Mexican businessman and politician. In the 2006 general election he was elected to the Chamber of Deputies to represent Sinaloa's 2nd district for the Institutional Revolutionary Party (PRI) during the 60th session of Congress.
