= José Mendicuti Pavón =

Mexican politician

- Born: 24 May 1947 (age 78); Mérida, Yucatán, Mexico
- Occupation: Politician
- Political party: PRI

José Ignacio Mendicuti Pavón (born 24 May 1947) is a Mexican politician from the Institutional Revolutionary Party. From 2000 to 2003 he served as Deputy of the LVIII Legislature of the Mexican Congress representing Yucatán.
