= Jorge Hernández Hernández =

Mexican politician

- Born: 18 August 1965 (age 61); State of Mexico, Mexico
- Education: UNAM; UAEM
- Occupation: Politician
- Political party: PRI

Jorge Hernández Hernández (born 18 August 1965) is a Mexican politician from the Institutional Revolutionary Party (PRI). In the 2009 mid-terms he was elected to the Chamber of Deputies to represent the State of Mexico's 11th district during the 61st session of Congress.
