= Policarpo Infante =

Mexican politician

- Born: 26 May 1948 (age 77); El Fuerte, Sinaloa, Mexico
- Occupation: Politician
- Political party: PRI

Policarpo Infante Fierro (born 26 May 1948) is a Mexican politician from the Institutional Revolutionary Party (PRI). In the 2000 general election he was elected to the Chamber of Deputies to represent Sinaloa's 2nd district during the 58th session of Congress.
