= Rubén Félix Hays =

Mexican politician

- Born: 15 March 1964 (age 62); Los Mochis, Sinaloa, Mexico
- Education: ITESM
- Occupation: Deputy
- Political party: PANAL

Rubén Benjamín Félix Hays (born 15 March 1964) is a Mexican politician affiliated with the PANAL. As of 2013 he served as Deputy of both the LVIII and LXII Legislatures of the Mexican Congress representing Sinaloa.
