= Silvia Álvarez Bruneliere =

Mexican politician

- Born: 5 March 1941 (age 85); Nochistlán, Zacatecas, Mexico
- Occupation: Politician
- Political party: PAN

Silvia Álvarez Bruneliere (born 5 March 1941) is a Mexican politician from the National Action Party. From 2000 to 2003 she served as Deputy of the LVIII Legislature of the Mexican Congress representing Guanajuato.
