= Benjamín Ayala Velázquez =

Mexican politician

- Born: 7 October 1964 (age 61); Torreón, Coahuila, Mexico
- Occupation: Politician
- Political party: PRI

Benjamín Ayala Velázquez (born 7 October 1964) is a Mexican politician from the Institutional Revolutionary Party. From 2000 to 2003 he served as Deputy of the LVIII Legislature of the Mexican Congress representing Coahuila.
