= Francisco Esparza Hernández =

Mexican politician

- Born: 2 April 1941 (age 85); Chalchihuites, Zacatecas, Mexico
- Occupation: Politician
- Political party: PAN

Francisco Esparza Hernández (born 2 April 1941) is a Mexican politician from the National Action Party. From 2000 to 2003 he served as Deputy of the LVIII Legislature of the Mexican Congress representing Durango.
