= Francisco Ramos Montaño =

Mexican politician

- Born: 21 January 1980 (age 46); Puebla, Puebla, Mexico
- Occupation: Politician
- Political party: PRI

Francisco Ramos Montaño (born 21 January 1980) is a Mexican politician from the Institutional Revolutionary Party (PRI). In the 2009 mid-terms he was elected to the Chamber of Deputies to represent Puebla's 6th district during the 61st session of Congress.
