= Verónica Sada Pérez =

Mexican politician

- Born: 31 August 1963 (age 62); Monterrey, Nuevo León, Mexico
- Education: ITESM
- Occupation: Deputy
- Political party: PAN

Verónica Sada Pérez (born 31 August 1963) is a Mexican politician affiliated with the PAN. As of 2013 she served as Deputy of the LXII Legislature of the Mexican Congress representing Nuevo León.
