= Silvestre Faya Viesca =

Mexican politician

- Born: 15 July 1952 (age 73); Torreón, Coahuila, Mexico
- Occupation: Politician
- Political party: PAN

Silvestre Enrique Faya Viesca (born 15 July 1952) is a Mexican politician from the National Action Party. From 2002 to 2003 he served as Deputy of the LVIII Legislature of the Mexican Congress representing Coahuila.
