= Felipe Solís Acero =

Mexican politician

- Born: 5 February 1956 (age 70); Reynosa, Tamaulipas, Mexico
- Occupation: Politician
- Political party: PRI

Felipe Solís Acero (born 5 February 1956) is a Mexican politician from the Institutional Revolutionary Party. He has served as Deputy of the LVIII and LXI Legislatures of the Mexican Congress representing Tamaulipas.
