= Luis Ricardo Aldana =

Mexican politician

- Born: 3 May 1954 (age 72); Orizaba, Veracruz, Mexico
- Occupation: Deputy
- Political party: PRI

Luis Ricardo Aldana Prieto (born 3 May 1954) is a Mexican politician affiliated with the PRI. As of 2013 he served as Deputy of both the LX and LXII Legislatures of the Mexican Congress representing Veracruz. He also served as Senator in the LVIII and LIX Legislatures.
