= Héctor Méndez Alarcón =

Mexican politician (born 1959)

- Born: 11 September 1959 (age 67); Hidalgo, Mexico
- Education: UNAM
- Occupation: Politician
- Political party: PAN

Héctor Méndez Alarcón (born 11 September 1959) is a Mexican politician from the National Action Party. From 2000 to 2003 he served as a federal deputy of the LVIII Legislature of the Mexican Congress representing Hidalgo. He previously served as a local deputy in the LVI Legislature of the Congress of Hidalgo.
