= Félix Castellanos Hernández =

Mexican politician

- Born: 17 December 1961 (age 64); Mexico City, Mexico
- Occupation: Politician
- Political party: MC

Félix Castellanos Hernández (born 17 December 1961) is a Mexican politician from the Citizens' Movement. From 2006 to 2009 he served as Deputy of the LX Legislature of the Mexican Congress representing Guerrero.
