= Esveida Bravo Martínez =

Mexican politician

- Born: 12 October 1932 (age 93); Mexico City, Mexico
- Occupation: Politician
- Political party: PVEM

Esveida Bravo Martínez (born 12 October 1932) is a Mexican politician from the Ecologist Green Party of Mexico. She has served as Deputy of the LVIII and LX Legislatures of the Mexican Congress representing Morelos.
