= Víctor Aldana =

Spanish-born Romanian footballer

Victor Aldana
Personal information
- Full name: Víctor Aldana Maestre
- Date of birth: 9 June 1981 (age 45)
- Place of birth: Badajoz, Spain
- Height: 1.82 m (6 ft 0 in)
- Position: Defender

Youth career
- 1997–2000: Barcelona

Senior career*
Years	Team	Apps	(Gls)
2000–2002	Vilobí		
2002–2003	Electrica Timişoara		
2004–2005	CFR Timişoara	22	(0)
2005–2009	FC Timişoara II	33	(1)
2006–2008	→ CFR Timişoara (loan)	46	(1)
2009–2010	Săgeata Stejaru	21	(1)
2011	ACS Recaș		
- * Club domestic league appearances and goals as of 10 January 2009

Víctor Aldana Maestre (born 9 June 1981, Badajoz, Spain) is a Spanish former footballer with Romanian citizenship.
