= Maximiliano Alexander Rábago =

Mexican lawyer, politician, and professor (b. 1977)

Rubén Maximiliano Alexander Rábago
- Born: 6 October 1977 (age 48); Mexico City, Mexico
- Education: Universidad nacional autónoma de México, Centro de estudios jurídicos Carbonell
- Occupations: Lawyer, politician and professor.

Rubén Maximiliano Alexander Rábago born 6 October 1977 is a Mexican lawyer, politician, and academic. He served as a local deputy in the LIV Legislature of the State of Mexico and as a federal deputy in the LIX Legislature of the Mexican Congress, representing the State of Mexico.

From 2018 to 2021, he was the first trustee of the Naucalpan City Council, where he chaired the Edilicia Finance Commission and was a member of the Ethics Committee for Public Servants. He has also held various positions in public administration, including Deputy General Director of Municipal Affairs at the Ministry of the Interior, Municipal Secretary, and Coordinator of Intergovernmental Relations for the Judiciary of the State of Mexico.

Since 2014, he has been a professor at the UNAM Faculty of Law, teaching courses such as Theory of Power, Introduction to the Study of Law, and Constitutional Law, among others.

of Congress.
