= Marco Vinicio Juárez Fierro =

Mexican politician

- Born: 29 May 1976 (age 49); Mexico City, Mexico
- Occupation: Politician
- Political party: PRI

Marco Vinicio Juárez Fierro (born 29 May 1976) is a Mexican politician from the Institutional Revolutionary Party. From 2002 to 2003 he served as Deputy of the LVIII Legislature of the Mexican Congress representing the State of Mexico.
