= Enrique Aguilar Borrego =

Mexican politician

- Born: 10 December 1948; Culiacán, Sinaloa, Mexico
- Died: 14 June 2009 (aged 60)
- Occupation: Politician
- Political party: PRI

Enrique Alonso Aguilar Borrego (10 December 1948 – 14 June 2009) was a Mexican trade unionist and politician from the Institutional Revolutionary Party. From 2000 to 2003 he served as Deputy of the LVIII Legislature of the Mexican Congress representing Sinaloa.
