= Felipe Aldana =

Argentine poet

- Born: 1922
- Died: 1970 (aged 47–48)
- Writing career
- Language: Spanish
- Genre: Poetry

Felipe Aldana (1922–1970) was an Argentine poet.

== Biography ==
Felipe Aldana Piazza was born in 1922 in Máximo Paz, in the south of the province of Santa Fe, in the republic of Argentina. He spent his childhood in Rosario. Because of his shyness, he lived isolated from people, as much because of his character as because of his extreme nearsightedness. This isolation would grow in the coming years because of his mental illness.

In the 1940s, he was associated with the Socialist Party, and together with Eduardo Juan, Eugenio Chort, and others, he founded in 1943 the first Puppet Theater of Rosario "Retabillo de Don Cristóbal," a name that refers to the work of Federico García Lorca. Although he published poems and stories in a variety of Argentine magazines, during his life he could only publish one book of poems: Un Poco De Poesía: Cancionero de Flor y Letra (1949). After having undergone a lobotomy, Aldana profusely wrote the rest of his work, which would remain practically unedited until 1977. In one of his most celebrated poems, it reads, "In order to speak only one poem / one only / has to be crazy of beauty" (Los Poemas del Gran Río), verses that could summarize his overall view of poetry. Felipe Aldana died in 1970 in Rosario.

== Legacy ==
In the 1980s, the young people of Rosario (a place hit hard since 1977) who protested against the military dictatorship painted on the walls some verses that were emblematic of Aldana, which before had been disseminated orally and later in written form.

In his honor, the Cátedra Libre Felipe Aldana (Felipe Aldana Chair) of the Faculty of Humanities and Arts at the National University of Rosario was established. For the same reason, the Concurso Felipe Aldana de Poesía (Felipe Aldana Poetry Contest) was organized by the Secretary of Culture and Education of the Municipality of Rosario, through the Municipal Editorial of Rosario.

== Published works ==
- Some poetry: Song of Flower and lyrics (Un Poco De Poesía: Cancionero de Flor y Letra). Rosario: Student Center-Free Institute of Humanities, 1949. 62 p.
- Poetry (Obra Poética). Introduction and notes by Eduardo Eduardo D'Anna and Elvio Gandolfo. Rosario: IEN Editions, 1977. 197 p. Contains: a little poetry, Poem Materialistic, Presence of Time and Death, The Poems of the Great River and other books unpublished until this edition. Includes iconography.
- As a word you could say (Como Una Palabra Que Pudiste Decir). Colophon of Eduardo D'Anna. Villa Maria, Cordoba: Editions Rhadamanthus-platelet Herrero, 1996. 6 h. Contains 3 poems of Poems of the Great River.
- Poetry and other texts (Obra Poética y Otros Textos). Selection, preface and notes by Osvaldo Aguirre. Rosario: Rosario Municipal Editorial, 2001. 274 p. 2a. Edition: 2006. Includes iconography and literature on the author
