= Salvador Ruiz Sánchez =

Mexican politician

- Born: 19 February 1961 (age 65); State of Mexico, Mexico
- Occupation: Politician
- Political party: PRD

Salvador Ruiz Sánchez (born 19 February 1961) is a Mexican politician affiliated with the Party of the Democratic Revolution (PRD). In the 2006 general election he was elected to the Chamber of Deputies In the 2003 mid-terms he was elected to the Chamber of Deputies to represent the State of Mexico's 11th district during the 60th session of Congress.
