= Luis Artemio Aldana Burgos =

Mexican politician

- Born: 21 October 1962 (age 63); Mérida, Yucatán, Mexico
- Occupation: Politician
- Political party: PAN

Luis Artemio Aldana Burgos (born 21 October 1962) is a Mexican politician from the National Action Party. From 2000 to 2003, he served as Deputy of the LVIII Legislature of the Mexican Congress representing Yucatán.
