= Maricruz Cruz Morales =

Mexican politician

- Born: 2 May 1971 (age 55); Michoacán, Mexico
- Occupation: Deputy
- Political party: PRI

Maricruz Cruz Morales (born 2 May 1971) is a Mexican politician affiliated with the PRI. As of 2013 she served as Deputy of the LXII Legislature of the Mexican Congress representing Michoacán.
