= Aldana (municipality) =

Coordinates: 0°53′N 77°42′W

- Municipality and town
- Flag

- Location of the municipality and town of Aldana in the Nariño Department of Colombia.
- Country: Colombia
- Department: Nariño Department

Area
  - Total: 52 km^{2} (20 sq mi)

Population (2017)
  - Total: 6,085
- Time zone: UTC-5 (Colombia Standard Time)

Aldana is a town and municipality in the Nariño Department, Colombia.

== Climate ==
Aldana has a cold subtropical highland climate (Köppen Cfb) with moderate rainfall year-round.

Climate data for Aldana (San Luis Airport), elevation 2,961 m (9,715 ft), (1981–2010)
Month	Jan	Feb	Mar	Apr	May	Jun	Jul	Aug	Sep	Oct	Nov	Dec	Year
Mean daily maximum °C (°F)	16.3 (61.3)	16.4 (61.5)	16.3 (61.3)	16.4 (61.5)	16.0 (60.8)	15.1 (59.2)	14.6 (58.3)	14.9 (58.8)	15.9 (60.6)	16.8 (62.2)	16.9 (62.4)	16.6 (61.9)	16.0 (60.8)
Daily mean °C (°F)	11.2 (52.2)	11.3 (52.3)	11.4 (52.5)	11.4 (52.5)	11.3 (52.3)	10.6 (51.1)	10.0 (50.0)	10.0 (50.0)	10.5 (50.9)	11.1 (52.0)	11.4 (52.5)	11.3 (52.3)	11.0 (51.8)
Mean daily minimum °C (°F)	5.8 (42.4)	6.0 (42.8)	6.4 (43.5)	6.6 (43.9)	6.6 (43.9)	6.0 (42.8)	5.1 (41.2)	4.6 (40.3)	4.6 (40.3)	5.6 (42.1)	6.2 (43.2)	6.2 (43.2)	5.8 (42.4)
Average precipitation mm (inches)	73.9 (2.91)	71.7 (2.82)	95.2 (3.75)	102.1 (4.02)	82.5 (3.25)	51.4 (2.02)	40.5 (1.59)	31.7 (1.25)	42.6 (1.68)	84.9 (3.34)	100.9 (3.97)	97.2 (3.83)	874.6 (34.43)
Average precipitation days	19	18	20	21	22	22	20	18	17	19	20	21	236
Average relative humidity (%)	83	83	84	85	85	85	84	82	81	82	83	84	83
Mean monthly sunshine hours	133.3	107.3	99.2	111.0	127.1	129.0	139.5	139.5	129.0	130.2	123.0	130.2	1,498.3
Mean daily sunshine hours	4.3	3.8	3.2	3.7	4.1	4.3	4.5	4.5	4.3	4.2	4.1	4.2	4.1
Source: Instituto de Hidrologia Meteorologia y Estudios Ambientales
