= Juan Carlos Pallares Bueno =

Mexican politician

- Born: 30 April 1970 (age 56); Quintana Roo, Mexico
- Occupation: Politician
- Political party: PAN

Juan Carlos Pallares Bueno (born 30 April 1970) is a Mexican politician from the National Action Party. From 2000 to 2003 he served as Deputy of the LVIII Legislature of the Mexican Congress representing Quintana Roo.
