= Víctor Hugo Círigo Vázquez =

Mexican politician

- Born: 8 April 1953 (age 73); Mariscala de Juárez, Oaxaca, Mexico
- Education: UAM
- Occupation: Politician
- Political party: PRD (1989–2009); PVEM / PRI (2009–present)

Víctor Hugo Círigo Vázquez (born 8 April 1953) is a Mexican politician from the Ecologist Green Party of Mexico (PVEM) (partially affiliated with the Institutional Revolutionary Party).

He has served in the Chamber of Deputies for two sessions of Congress: from 2000 to 2003, representing the Federal District's 25th district for the Party of the Democratic Revolution (PRD), and from 2006 to 2009, as a PVEM plurinominal deputy for the fourth region.
