= Isabel Pallarès =

Spanish trade unionist (1964–2021)

General secretary of Intersindical-CSC
- In office 1998–2003
- Preceded by: Miquel Porter i Moix
- Succeeded by: Carles Sastre i Benlliure

Personal details
- Born: 1964 Almacelles, Catalonia, Spain
- Died: 24 June 2021 (aged 57) Barcelona, Catalonia, Spain
- Profession: Teacher; trade unionist

Isabel Pallarès i Roqué (1964 – 24 June 2021) was a Catalan teacher and trade unionist who was the first woman to serve as general secretary of a class trade union organization in Catalonia, a position she held for 15 years.

== Biography ==
As a teacher, Pallarès taught secondary education at Intersindical-CSC in the 1990s. Between 1998 and 2003, she served as general secretary of the pro-independence union, becoming the first woman in Catalonia to lead a class union organization. Pallarès was elected confederal secretary, a position that would eventually become general secretary in 1998 to replace Miquel Porter i Moix. After fifteen years at the head of the organization, she gave her testimony to Carles Sastre i Benlliure, who had accompanied her during her term as secretary of Trade Union Action. Later, the union was led by Sergi Perelló i Miró.

The years of Pallarès as the general secretary of Intersindical-CSC explain the evolution and the current positioning of the power station, which in recent years has experienced strong growth. She managed to move from a model of federated autonomous unions to a more confederal and unitary type organization and to make social and national demands more explicit and forceful. Pallarès was still active in the union's organs; she was part of its national secretariat. In the international sphere, Intersyndical-CSC consolidated the relationship with ELA and the IGC and opened intense relations with LAB, which led it to create the Platform of Stateless Nations Unions.

Pallarès died on 24 June 2021 at the age of 57, leaving a husband and two children, after suffering a long illness.
