= Martha Angélica Bernardino Rojas =

Mexican politician

- Born: 2 August 1973 (age 53); Mexico City, Mexico
- Occupation: Politician
- Political party: PRD

Martha Angélica Bernardino Rojas (Note: In this Mexican name, the surname is Bernardino and the second or maternal family name is Rojas.) (born 2 August 1973) is a Mexican politician from the Party of the Democratic Revolution (PRD). She served as a deputy during the 58th and 61st Congresses representing the State of Mexico, as well as a local deputy in the Congress of the State of Mexico.
