= Jaime Cervantes Rivera =

Mexican politician

- Born: 7 March 1955 (age 71); Tuxpan, Nayarit, Mexico
- Occupation: Politician
- Political party: PT

Jaime Cervantes Rivera (born 7 March 1955) is a Mexican politician from the Labor Party. From 2006 to 2009 he served as Deputy of the LX Legislature of the Mexican Congress representing Nayarit. He previously served in the Congress of Nayarit.
