= Samuel Aguilar Solís =

Mexican politician

- Born: 17 June 1956 (age 69); San Juan de Guadalupe, Durango, Mexico
- Occupation: Politician
- Political party: PRI

Samuel Aguilar Solís (born 17 June 1956) is a Mexican politician from the Institutional Revolutionary Party. He has served as Deputy of the LVIII and LX Legislatures of the Mexican Congress and as Senator of the LVI and LVII Legislatures representing Durango.
