= Francisco Ávila Camberos =

Mexican politician

Francisco Ávila Camberos (born 13 December 1948) is a Mexican politician who is candidate of the PAN (Partido Acción Nacional), and became friends with Jorge González Olivieri, the director of API (Administración Portuaria Integral de Veracruz), and the former president of Mexico, Vicente Fox. A graduate of the Universidad Veracruzana, he was a federal deputy in the LIX Legislature of the Mexican Congress.

== See also ==
- Veracruz state election, 1997

Preceded by Roberto Bueno Campos	Municipal President of Veracruz; 1997 - 2000	Succeeded by José Ramón Gutiérrez de Velasco
