= Diego Cobo Terrazas =

Mexican politician

- Born: 23 November 1973 (age 52); Veracruz, Mexico
- Education: UNAM
- Occupation: Politician
- Political party: PVEM

Diego Cobo Terrazas (born 23 November 1973) is a Mexican politician from the Ecologist Green Party of Mexico. He has served as Deputy of the LVIII and LX Legislatures of the Mexican Congress representing Veracruz.
