= Carlos Raymundo Toledo =

Mexican politician

- Born: 8 February 1954 (age 72); Chiapas, Mexico
- Education: UNAM
- Occupation: Politician
- Political party: PAN

Carlos Raymundo Toledo (born 8 February 1954) is a Mexican politician from the National Action Party. From 2000 to 2003 he served as Deputy of the LVIII Legislature of the Mexican Congress representing Chiapas, and previously served as municipal president of Huixtla.
