= Noemí Guzmán Lagunes =

Mexican politician

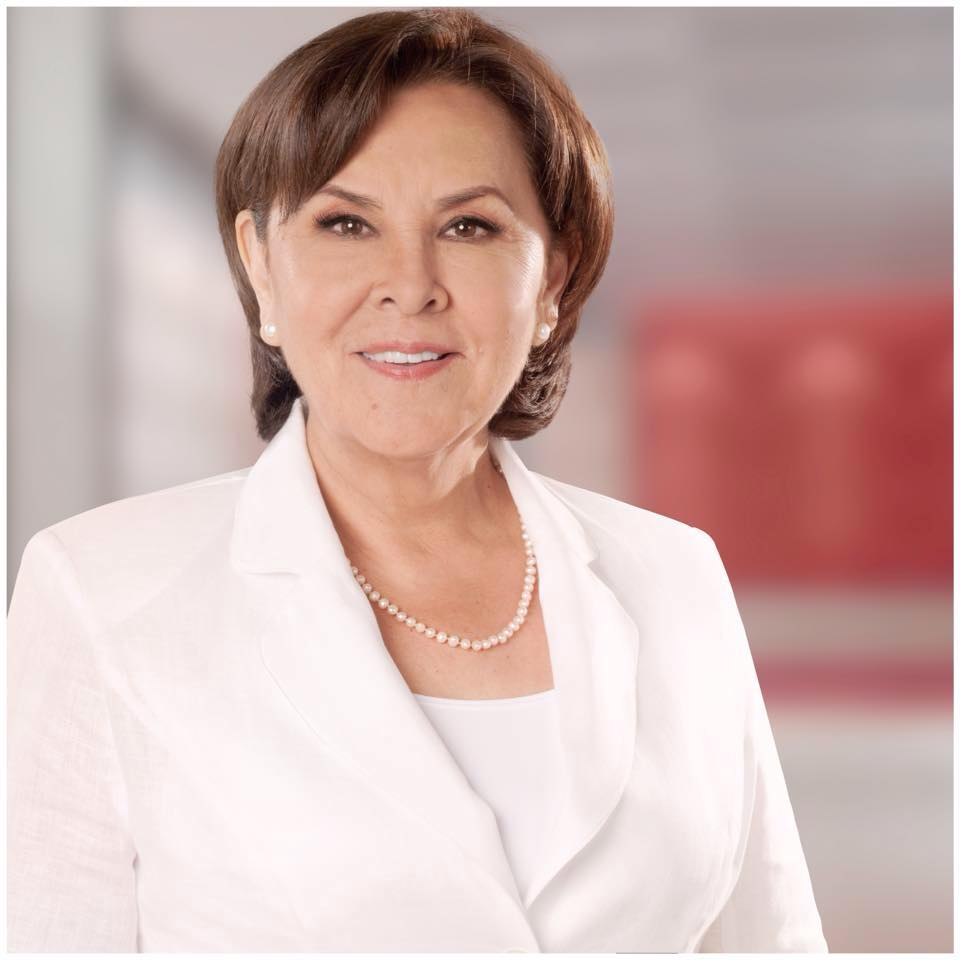

Member of the Senate for Veracruz
- In office 30 October 2000 – 31 August 2006
- Preceded by: Fernando Gutiérrez Barrios
- Succeeded by: Arturo Herviz Reyes

Personal details
- Born: 8 May 1954 (age 71) Teocelo, Veracruz, Mexico
- Party: Institutional Revolutionary Party
- Occupation: Politician

Noemí Zoila Guzmán Lagunes (born 8 May 1954) is a Mexican politician affiliated with the Institutional Revolutionary Party (PRI). She represented the ninth electoral district of Veracruz (centered on Coatepec) as a deputy to the 63rd Congress (2015–2018), her third term as a federal deputy and fifth overall.

== Life ==
Guzmán received her undergraduate degree from the Universidad de Xalapa in 1978, two years after she was elected as municipal president of Teocelo and four years after joining the PRI. Between 1982 and 1985, she served as the Secretary of Public Education of Veracruz, and in the late 1980s and early 1990s, she primarily served in electoral and PRI political positions, including as a regional coordinator for the Veracruz State Electoral Commission between 1987 and 1988, and as the state secretary general (1989–92) and director (1992–95) of the PRI's Council for the Integration of Women. She also presided over a foundation, El Porvenir, during this time.

Guzmán first served as a federal deputy in the 55th Congress, which met between 1991 and 1994. After a three-year gap in which she was a national coordinator of the DIF, she returned to San Lázaro for the 57th Congress. She presided over the Civil Protection Commission and served on those dealing with Human Settlements and Public Works, Municipal Strengthening, and Special for Social Development, in addition to serving as the leader of the PRI delegation of deputies from Veracruz.

In 2000, voters in Veracruz elected Fernando Gutiérrez Barrios, a retired captain, ex-governor and former head of the Dirección Federal de Seguridad, as one of their senators. However, he was in ill health, and though he took the oath of office on 1 September, it was Guzmán Lagunes, as his alternate, who filled the seat after he died on 30 October. In the Senate, Guzmán was a secretary on the Permanent Commission as well as Rules and Parliamentary Practices, Foreign Relations/Asia-Pacific, and Agrarian Reform, as well as a member of the commissions on Urban Development and Land Use; Federalism and Municipal Development; Hydraulic Resources; and Special for the National Disaster Fund. In addition, in 2003, she promoted the creation of the National Civil Protection Award, and in 2004, she graduated from the Universidad de Oriente de Puebla with a degree in law.

After several years out of public life, Guzmán resurfaced in 2010 when new governor Javier Duarte appointed her to be the Secretary of Civil Protection in Veracruz. She left the position in January 2015 in order to run for the Chamber of Deputies. She serves on the Civil Protection, Finances and Public Credit, and Communications Commission. Additionally, she is a secretary of the Mesa de Decanos of the Chamber of Deputies, a ceremonial institution whose members are the longest-tenured federal legislators.
