= Escobar (surname) =

Spanish surname

Escobar is a Spanish surname. Notable people with the surname include:

- Abelardo Escobar Prieto (1936–2019), Mexican politician
- Agustín Escobar (died 2025), Spanish business executive
- Anasol Escobar (born 1976), Colombian singer
- Alcides Escobar (born 1986), Venezuelan baseball player
- Álex Escobar (born 1965), Colombian footballer
- Alex Escobar (presenter) (born 1974), Brazilian journalist and TV presenter
- Alex Escobar (born 1978), Venezuelan baseball player
- Alexander Escobar (born 1984), Salvadoran footballer
- Alexander Escobar Gañán (born 1965), Colombian footballer
- Alexandra Escobar (born 1980), Ecuadorian weightlifter
- Ana Vilma de Escobar (born 1954), Salvadoran politician
- Andrea Escobar (born 1992), Colombian actress
- Andrés Escobar (1967–1994), Colombian footballer shot dead by angry fans after accidentally scoring an own goal that eliminated his team from the 1994 FIFA World Cup
- Andrés Ramiro Escobar (born 1991), Colombian footballer
- Ángel Escobar (born 1965), Venezuelan baseball player
- Antonio Escobar Núñez (born 1976), Spanish musician
- Antonio Escobar y Mendoza, 17th-century Spanish ethicist
- Arturo Escobar (anthropologist) (born 1952), Colombian-American anthropologist and development scholar
- Arturo Escobar y Vega (born 1970), Mexican politician
- Brandon Escobar (born 1990), Honduran sport wrestler
- Carlos Escobar Casarin (born 1990), Chilean footballer
- Carlos Escobar Ortíz (born 1989), Chilean footballer
- César Antonio Díaz Escobar (born 1975), Chilean footballer
- Daniel Escobar (1964–2013), American actor
- Daniela Escobar (born 1969), Brazilian actress and television presenter
- Darío Escobar (born 1971), Guatemalan artist
- Eduardo Escobar (born 1989), Venezuelan baseball player
- Edwin Escobar (born 1992), Venezuelan professional baseball player
- Elizam Escobar (1948–2021), Puerto Rican painter
- Enzo Escobar (born 1951), Chilean footballer
- Eusebio Escobar (born 1936), Colombian footballer
- Fabio Escobar (born 1982), Paraguayan footballer
- Francisco Escobar (born 1991), Colombian beauty pageant winner
- Gavin Escobar (1991–2022), American football player
- Isabel Escobar, Brazilian-American environmental engineer
- Jesse Escobar (died 2021), Belizean crime victim
- Jesús Escobar, American historian
- José Escobar (baseball) (born in 1960), Venezuelan baseball player
- José Escobar Saliente (1908–1994), Spanish comic writer and artist
- José Luis Escobar Alas (born 1959), Salvadoran bishop
- Juan Carlos Escobar (born 1982), Colombian footballer
- Juan Carlos Ortiz Escobar (died 2002), Colombian drug dealer
- Juan Francisco Escobar (born 1949), Paraguayan football referee
- Juan Manuel Escobar (born 1950), American politician and judge
- Sebastián Marroquín (born 1977), born Juan Pablo Escobar
- Katherine Escobar (born 1982), Colombian model and actress
- Kelvim Escobar (born 1976), Venezuelan baseball player
- Luis Escobar (disambiguation), multiple people
- Manolo Escobar (1931–2013), Spanish singer
- Marisol Escobar (1930–2016), Venezuelan-born sculptor
- Matías Escobar (born 1982), Argentine footballer
- Melba Escobar (born 1976), Colombian writer and journalist
- Miguel Escobar (born 1995), Argentine footballer
- Miguel Escobar (Colombian footballer) (1945–2023), Colombian footballer
- Pablo Escobar (1949–1993), Colombian drug lord and narcoterrorist
- Pablo Andrés Escobar (born 1987), Colombian footballer
- Pablo Daniel Escobar (born 1978), Paraguayan-born Bolivian footballer
- Pánfilo Escobar (born 1974), Paraguayan footballer
- Patricio Escobar (1843–1912), President of Paraguay
- Pedro de Escobar, 16th-century Portuguese composer
- Pepe Escobar (born 1954), Brazilian investigative journalist
- Pêro Escobar, 15th-century Portuguese explorer
- Ramón Escobar Santiago (1937–2020), Spanish politician
- Reynaldo Escobar Pérez, Mexican politician
- Rolando Escobar (born 1981), Panamanian footballer
- Ruth Escobar (1935–2017), Portuguese-born Brazilian actress, businesswoman, and politician
- Samuel Escobar (1934–2025), Peruvian evangelical theologian
- Sergi Escobar (born 1974), Spanish cyclist
- Sílvio Escobar (born 1986), Paraguayan footballer
- Sixto Escobar (1913–1979), Puerto Rican boxer
- Susana Escobar (born 1987), Mexican swimmer
- Ticio Escobar (born 1947), Paraguayan minister of culture
- Veronica Escobar (born 1969), American politician from Texas
- Vicente Escobar (1757–1834), Cuban painter
- Walter Escobar (born 1968), Colombian footballer
- Yasmani Copello Escobar (born 1987), Cuban-Turkish hurdler
- Yunel Escobar (born 1982), Cuban-American baseball player
