= Zenyazen Escobar =

Mexican politician (1984–2026)

Federal Deputy for Veracruz's 16th
- In office 1 September 2026 – 4 September 2026

Secretary of Education of Veracruz
- In office 2018–2023

Local Deputy in the Congress of Veracruz
- In office 2016–2018

Personal details
- Born: 4 June 1984 Nogales, Veracruz, Mexico
- Died: c. 4 September 2026 (aged 42) Puente Nacional, Veracruz, Mexico
- Party: Morena
- Education: Universidad de Sotoviento
- Occupation: Politician

Zenyazen Roberto Escobar García (Note: In this Mexican name, the surname is Escobar and the second or maternal family name is García.) (4 June 1984 – c. 4 September 2026) was a Mexican politician affiliated with the National Regeneration Movement (Morena). A native of the state of Veracruz, he was the incumbent federal deputy for Veracruz's 16th district at the time of his death.

== Early life and political career ==
Zenyazen Escobar García was born in Nogales, Veracruz, on 4 June 1984. In 2009, he began work as a teacher on the Telesecundaria remote-learning system. He later earned a bachelor's degree in communication science from the Universidad de Sotoviento in 2018 and a master's in education science from the Centro de Estudios Avanzados de las Américas in 2021.

Before becoming a politician, Escobar worked as a stripper. From 2016 to 2018, he held a plurinominal seat and coordinated the Morena caucus in the Congress of Veracruz, and from 2018 to 2023 he was secretary of education in the Veracruz state government during the administration of Cuitláhuac García Jiménez. In 2023, he sought Morena's nomination to fight the 2024 gubernatorial election in Veracruz, but lost to Rocío Nahle.

In the 2024 general election, he was elected to the Chamber of Deputies to represent Veracruz's 16th district (Córdoba) during the 66th Congress. In Congress, he served as the secretary of the lower house's standing committees on climate change and sustainability and on naval affairs. He was also a member of the committee on economy, commerce and competitiveness and of the Mexico–Kuwait Friendship Group.

On 28 May 2026, he scuffled with Carlos Gutiérrez Mancilla of the Institutional Revolutionary Party (PRI) on the Chamber floor, after Gutiérrez called him a "damn stripper" and other opposition deputies accused him of being inebriated.

== Personal life ==
Escobar García was married for more than 25 years to Liliana López Coronado, with whom he had two children. López Coronado, previously the state attorney for the protection of children, won a position as a family judge on the Superior Court of Justice of Veracruz in the June 2025 election.

=== Death ===
Escobar García was found dead inside a Mercedes-Benz automobile along Federal Highway 140 in the municipality of Puente Nacional, Veracruz, on 4 September 2026. He was 42. Escobar had a gunshot wound to his head. One bullet casing was found in the car, and the car's doors were locked.

Ricardo Ahued Bardahuil, secretary of government of Veracruz, said that it did not appear to be an attack, and Governor Rocío Nahle sent her condolences to the family. Because of Escobar's position as a federal deputy, the investigation is being led by the office of the Attorney-General of the Republic (FGR) which, on 10 September 2026, announced that the investigation remained ongoing but that the evidence indicated a probable death by suicide.
