= Miguel Ángel Yunes =

Miguel Ángel Yunes may refer to:

- Miguel Ángel Yunes Linares (born 1952), Mexican politician, former governor of Veracruz
- Miguel Ángel Yunes Márquez (born 1976), Mexican politician, senator and son of the above
