= Guillermo Díaz Gea =

Mexican politician

- Born: 16 February 1944 (age 82); Pánuco, Veracruz, Mexico
- Occupation: Politician
- Political party: PRI

Guillermo Díaz Gea (Note: In this Mexican name, the surname is Díaz and the second or maternal family name is Gea.) (born 16 February 1944) is a Mexican politician from the Institutional Revolutionary Party (PRI).

He has been elected to the Chamber of Deputies on two occasions: in the 1991 mid-terms, to the 55th Congress, for Veracruz's 16th district; and in the 2000 general election, to the 58th Congress, for Veracruz's 1st district. He also served in the 52nd session of the Congress of Veracruz (1983–1986) and as the municipal president of his hometown of Pánuco, Veracruz, in 1988–1991 and 1998–2000.
