= Mauricio Duck Núñez =

Mexican politician (1973–2020)

Deputy of the Congress of the Union for the 16th district of Veracruz
- In office 1 September 2006 – 31 August 2009
- Preceded by: Sergio Penagos
- Succeeded by: Javier Duarte de Ochoa

Personal details
- Born: July 25, 1973 Córdoba, Veracruz, Mexico
- Died: October 9, 2020 (aged 47) Córdoba, Veracruz, Mexico
- Cause of death: Suicide
- Party: National Action Party
- Occupation: Politician

Edgar Mauricio Duck Núñez (25 July 1973 – 9 October 2020) was a Mexican politician from the National Action Party (PAN).

In the 2006 general election he was elected to the Chamber of Deputies to represent Veracruz's 16th district during the 60th Congress, and he had previously served in the Congress of Veracruz.

Duck Núñez died by suicide in his home town of Córdoba, Veracruz, on 9 October 2020.
