= Same-sex marriage in Veracruz =

Same-sex marriage has been legal in Veracruz since 13 June 2022. On 30 May 2022, the Supreme Court of Justice of the Nation ruled that Veracruz's same-sex marriage ban violated Articles 1 and 4 of the Constitution of Mexico. The ruling was meant to take effect upon publication in the Official Journal of the Federation, but the Congress of Veracruz passed a bill legalizing same-sex marriage 36–4 just three days later, on 2 June. The law was signed by Governor Cuitláhuac García Jiménez and published in the official state journal on 13 June, taking effect that same day. Veracruz was the 26th Mexican state to legalize same-sex marriage.

Veracruz has also recognised gender-neutral concubinage, granting same-sex cohabitating couples all of the rights and obligations of marriage, including adoption, since 11 June 2020.

== Legal history ==
=== Background ===
The Supreme Court of Justice of the Nation ruled on 12 June 2015 that state bans on same-sex marriage are unconstitutional nationwide. The court's ruling is considered a "jurisprudential thesis" and did not invalidate state laws, meaning that same-sex couples denied the right to marry would still have to seek individual amparos (Spanish pronunciation: [amˈpaɾo]; Nahuatl: manauili; Totonac: xalitakgawa; Huastec: tonkixtalab; Tepehua: ixpulaklo’oxikan) in court. The ruling standardized the procedures for judges and courts throughout Mexico to approve all applications for same-sex marriages and made the approval mandatory. Specifically, the court ruled that bans on same-sex marriage violate Articles 1 and 4 of the Constitution of Mexico. Article 1 of the Constitution states:

Any form of discrimination, based on ethnic or national origin, gender, age, disabilities, social status, medical conditions, religion, opinions, sexual orientation, marital status, or any other form, which violates the human dignity or seeks to annul or diminish the rights and freedoms of the people, is prohibited. (Note: In some official and indigenous languages of Veracruz: Spanish: Queda prohibida toda discriminación motivada por origen étnico o nacional, el género, la edad, las discapacidades, la condición social, las condiciones de salud, la religión, las opiniones, las preferencias sexuales, el estado civil o cualquier otra que atente contra la dignidad humana y tenga por objeto anular o menoscabar los derechos y libertades de las personas.; Nahuatl: Majmauilo nochi tlaixpinaualistli ika maseualtsitsi katli euani tomexkotlali, siuatl uan tlakatl, ininxiui, uan katli amo ueli motekipanolia, maseualmej, melauatlajkayotl, teotlanejnewili, tlatsintokilistli, kualtiloni pakilistli, sanimanyotl nemili o akinijki kichiuas tlaixpanoli ika maseual tlaixpinauali uan kipia tamantli tlaixkotonali o tlaijtlakoli tlen tlamelaualistli uan tlamakixtiistli ika maseualmej.; Totonac: Nixli’anat lalakgapalan akxni talakgxtapali kilhtsukut, minat, kata, tatuwajnit, tatakgsat, takanajla, takgalhchiwin, talakgatin, talatamat osu tu sipani latamana chu laktlawa osu chuxu xlakgchanat chu xlikstu xtapakgsit latamananin.; Huastec: K’wajat jolbidh an k’e’atnaxtalab abal tam jun pel i ts’ejwantal o tal ti al pil i kwenchaláb, max pel it inik o uxum, k’al I yaulats, k’al i belkaxtaláb, max tomkidh o ibaj ani pilchik i tsalap xi ne’ets kin odhnanchij in walkadhtalabíl patal an atiklabchik.; Tepehua: Kalaklhtanchakalhi̱ tejkan jantu̱ taun laqlaqts’inkan lapanaki̱ yu’ani machaqan, xanatin u jo’akna̱, ixjach’itin, licha̱ bataqan’anin, licha̱ jantu̱ maqalin, licha̱ tach’apata̱ taun laqalakstaqan’ati̱, licha̱ talakapu’an batu’uchuncha̱, licha̱ aputaun talakpastaknan, licha̱ ba’achani ixt’ajo’atk’an u ixt’axanati̱, lakxtuklata̱ u ba tu’uchunchacha̱ Yu jantu̱ oxi̱ kalaqts’ilhi̱ qayntaun lapanati̱ ali katanchanilhi̱ u kamalaqmixinilhi̱ yu paxtoqni’ ali uxamaktaun ku’uxuntayalhi̱.)

The Constitution of Veracruz does not expressly prohibit same-sex marriages. Article 6 of the Constitution states that "the State will promote the necessary conditions for the full enjoyment of liberty, equality, security and non-discrimination of the people".

In February 2014, a same-sex couple, Javier Olivares García and Víctor Durán Sáenz, applied for a marriage license at the civil registry office in Veracruz, but were denied by city officials. They subsequently filed an amparo, which was granted by a federal judge on 22 July. Despite this ruling, the registrar initially refused to schedule their ceremony. After presenting their amparo to the registrar in Boca del Río, the marriage was scheduled for 6 December, making theirs the first same-sex marriage in Veracruz. On 29 January 2015, the LGBT group Community Jarochos (Comunidad Jarochos), announced that a lesbian couple had also been granted an amparo and would marry on 4 April. The group further reported that there were eight additional amparos pending. Four more couples filed amparos on 16 May 2016, and on 26 May three couples were granted the right to marry. A lawsuit challenging article 75 of the Civil Code, which defined marriage as the "union of a man and a woman", was filed on 20 July 2017 with the Fourth District Court. On 7 November 2017, Judge José Loranca Luna declared the state's same-sex marriage ban unconstitutional. Guillermo Izacur Maldonado, president of Comunidad Jarochos, stated that the ruling was a "general injunction" applying to all same-sex couples in Veracruz and that, consequently, same-sex marriage should be considered legal in the state. Nevertheless, state officials announced that they would continue to enforce the ban despite the court's decision. By August 2017, 18 same-sex marriages had been performed in Veracruz, increasing to 69 by early 2019, and to 150 by July 2020. All these marriages were carried out through the recurso de amparo remedy.

=== Legislative action ===
==== Early bills and attempt at constitutional ban ====
Civil union legislation was first proposed in Veracruz in 2014. In March 2014, Deputy Cuauhtémoc Pola Estrada from the Citizens' Movement party introduced a partnership bill to the Congress of Veracruz. The bill was opposed by the governing parties and saw little legislation action. Pola Estrada introduced a same-sex marriage bill in July 2014. In September, he said it was awaiting reviews by legislative committees. In April 2015, citing disappointment with the legislative inaction, the State Human Rights Commission announced its intention to propose another bill. In July 2016, Deputy Mónica Robles Barajas from the Ecologist Green Party submitted another measure to legalize same-sex marriage. These bills saw very little legislative progress due to opposition from the governing National Action Party (PAN).

In July 2018, as one of the last actions of the legislative term, the National Action Party submitted a proposal to Congress to explicitly ban same-sex marriage in the State Constitution. It failed to pass, with 32 deputies in favor, 10 against and 2 absentions. As 33 votes were needed to amend the Constitution, the measure failed by one vote. The July 2018 elections resulted in the National Regeneration Movement (MORENA), which supports the legalization of same-sex marriage, winning the governorship and the majority of legislative seats in Congress.

==== Cohabitation law ====
On 28 May 2020, the Congress of Veracruz passed a cohabitation bill by a vote of 35–14. The law grants cohabitating couples, different-sex or same-sex, the same rights, benefits and obligations as married couples. The law was published in the official state journal on 10 June, following Governor Cuitláhuac García Jiménez's signature, and went into effect the following day. The legislation defines cohabitation as follows: Concubinage is the de facto union between two people who are not bound by a contract, are both free from marriage, and have decided to share their lives in mutual support. (Note: Spanish: El concubinato es la unión de hecho entre dos personas, sin que exista un contrato entre ellos, ambos se encuentren libres de matrimonio y que deciden compartir la vida para apoyarse mutuamente.)

28 May 2020 vote in the Congress
| Party | Voted for | Voted against | Abstained | Absent (Did not vote) |
|---|---|---|---|---|
| National Regeneration Movement | 27: Cristina Alarcón Gutiérrez; Augusto Álvarez Pellico; Raymundo Andrade Rivera; Magaly Armenta Oliveros; José Castellanos Velázquez; Elizabeth Cervantes de la Cruz; Margarita Corro Mendoza; Amado Cruz Malpica; Eric Domínguez Vázquez; Ana Ferráez Centeno; Rosalinda Galindo Silva; Juan Gómez Cazarín; Henri Gómez Sánchez; Wenceslao González Martínez; Carlos Jiménez Díaz; León Jiménez Reyes; Deisy Juan Antonio; Adriana Linares Capitanachi; María López Callejas; Florencia Martínez Rivera; Adriana Martínez Sánchez; José Pozos Castro; Jessica Ramírez Cisneros; Rubén Ríos Uribe; Mónica Robles Barajas; José Rosales Torres; Vicky Tadeo Ríos | – | – | 1: Víctor Vargas Barrientos |
| National Action Party | – | 13: Enrique Cambranis Torres; Juan De Unanue Abascal; María Gamboa Torales; Rodrigo García Escalante; Sergio Hernández Hernández; María Hernández Íñiguez; Nora Lagunes Jáuregui; María Martínez Díaz; Omar Miranda Romero; Monserrat Ortega Ruíz; Judith Pineda Andrade; Bingen Rementeria Molina; Ricardo Serna Barajas | – | – |
| Social Encounter Party | 1: María Francisco Doce | 1: Gonzalo Guízar Valladares | – | – |
| Institutional Revolutionary Party | 3: Erika Ayala Ríos; Jorge Moreno Salinas; Juan Molina Palacios | – | – | – |
| Citizens' Movement | 1: Ivonne Trujillo Ortiz | – | – | – |
| Ecologist Green Party of Mexico | 1: Andrea Yunes Yunes | – | – | – |
| Party of the Democratic Revolution | 1: Brianda Hernández Topete | – | – | – |
| Total | 35 | 14 | 0 | 1 |
| Total | 70.0% | 28.0% | 0.0% | 2.0% |

==== Action of unconstitutionality and passage of legislation ====
On 28 May 2020, the Congress of Veracruz amended state family law to recognize same-sex cohabitation but left the same-sex marriage ban in place. Shortly following the law's publication in the official state journal on 10 June, the National Human Rights Commission filed an action of unconstitutionality (acción de inconstitucionalidad; docketed 144/2020) against the state of Veracruz, contesting the constitutionality of the new cohabitation law and various articles of the Civil Code that banned same-sex marriage. This lawsuit sought to fully legalize same-sex marriage in the state, similarly to what had happened in numerous other states, including Jalisco (2016), Chiapas (2017), Puebla (2017), Aguascalientes (2019), and Nuevo León (2019). On 30 May 2022, the Supreme Court ruled 10–0 that article 75 of the Civil Code, which banned same-sex marriage, was void and unconstitutional. The decision would officially take effect upon publication in the Official Journal of the Federation (Diario Oficial de la Federación), but state civil registry officials had the possibility to implement the decision immediately.

On 2 June, three days after the Supreme Court ruling, the Congress of Veracruz passed legislation by 36 votes to 4 amending state law to define marriage as the union of "two people". The bill had been introduced two months prior on 5 April by deputies Gonzalo Durán Chincoya and Ramón Diaz Ávila. It was published in the official state journal on 13 June, following Governor Cuitláhuac García Jiménez's signature, and took effect that same day. The first same-sex couple to marry in Veracruz under the new law were Wendy Segovia Aguilar and Lucía González Cruz in San Andrés Tuxtla on 15 June 2022. Article 75 of the Civil Code of Veracruz was amended to read: Marriage is the union of two individuals, formalized through a civil contract, who freely decide to share a joint life project founded on an affectionate relationship marked by permanence, cooperation, and mutual support, and without any legal impediment. (Note: Spanish: El matrimonio es la unión de dos personas a través de un contrato civil que, en ejercicio de su voluntad, deciden compartir un proyecto de vida conjunto, a partir de una relación afectiva con ánimo de permanencia, cooperación y apoyo mutuo y sin impedimento legal alguno.)

2 June 2022 vote in the Congress
| Party | Voted for | Voted against | Abstained | Absent (Did not vote) |
|---|---|---|---|---|
| National Regeneration Movement | 23: Elizabeth Cervantes de la Cruz; Margarita Corro Mendoza; Eusebia Cortés Pérez; Gonzalo Durán Chincoya; Illya Escobar Martínez; Rafael Fararoni Magaña; Ana Ferráez Centeno; Juan Gómez Cazarín; Cecilia Guevara Guembe; Genaro Ibáñez Martínez; Lourdes Juárez Lara; Gisela López López; Itzel López López; Luis Luna Rosales; Marco Martínez Amador; Paul Martinez Marie; Adriana Martínez Sánchez; Lidia Mezhua Campos; Jessica Ramírez Cisneros; Perla Romero Rodríguez; José Rosales Torres; Luis Santiago Martínez; Luis Zárate Díaz | – | – | 8: Magaly Armenta Oliveros; Fernando Arteaga Aponte; Bonifacio Castillo Cruz; Janix Castro Muñoz; Luis Cervantes Cruz; Rosalinda Galindo Silva; Sergio Guzmán Ricardez; Roberto San Román Solana |
| National Action Party | 5: Jaime De la Garza Martínez; Hugo González Saavedra; Miguel Hermida Copado; Othón Hernández Candanedo; Itzel Yescas Valdivia | 4: Enrique Cambranis Torres; Nora Lagunes Jáuregui; Verónica Pulido Herrera; Bingen Rementeria Molina | – | – |
| Institutional Revolutionary Party | 2: Arianna Angeles Aguirre; Anilú Ingram Vallines | – | – | 1: Marlon Ramírez Marín |
| Citizens' Movement | 2: Ruth Callejas Roldán; Maribel Ramírez Topete | – | – | – |
| Ecologist Green Party of Mexico | 2: Tania Cruz Mejía; Citlali Medellín Careaga | – | – | – |
| Labor Party | 2: Ramón Díaz Ávila; José Tehuintle Xocua | – | – | – |
| Force for Mexico | – | – | – | 1: Juan Santos Mendoza |
| Total | 36 | 4 | 0 | 10 |
| Total | 72.0% | 8.0% | 0.0% | 20.0% |

== Marriage statistics ==
By February 2023, approximately 240 same-sex marriages had taken place in the state, mostly in the city of Veracruz and Xalapa. Five same-sex divorces were performed in the same time period.

== Public opinion ==
According to a 2018 survey by the National Institute of Statistics and Geography, 54% of the Veracruz public opposed same-sex marriage, the fourth highest in Mexico.

== See also ==
- Same-sex marriage in Mexico
- LGBT rights in Mexico
