= Fernando Yunes Márquez =

Mexican politician

Personal details
- Born: 10 February 1982 (age 44) Xalapa, Veracruz, Mexico
- Party: National Action Party
- Occupation: Politician

Fernando Yunes Márquez (born 10 February 1982) is a Mexican politician affiliated with the National Action Party (PAN).

In the 2012 general election he was elected to the Senate for the state of Veracruz. Following his term in the Senate, he served as municipal president of Veracruz from 2018 to 2021.

He was elected to the Congress of Veracruz in June 2024. In July 2024 a warrant was issued for his arrest in connection with alleged electoral offences during his term as municipal president; Yunes Márquez described the charges as "political persecution".

Yunes Márquez is the son of former governor of Veracruz Miguel Ángel Yunes Linares and the brother of Senator Miguel Ángel Yunes Márquez.

Preceded by Ramón Poo Gil	Municipal President of Veracruz; 2018–2021	Succeeded by Patricia Lobeira Rodríguez
