= 2001 Mexican Chamber of Deputies bombing attempt =

Attempted terrorist attack in Mexico

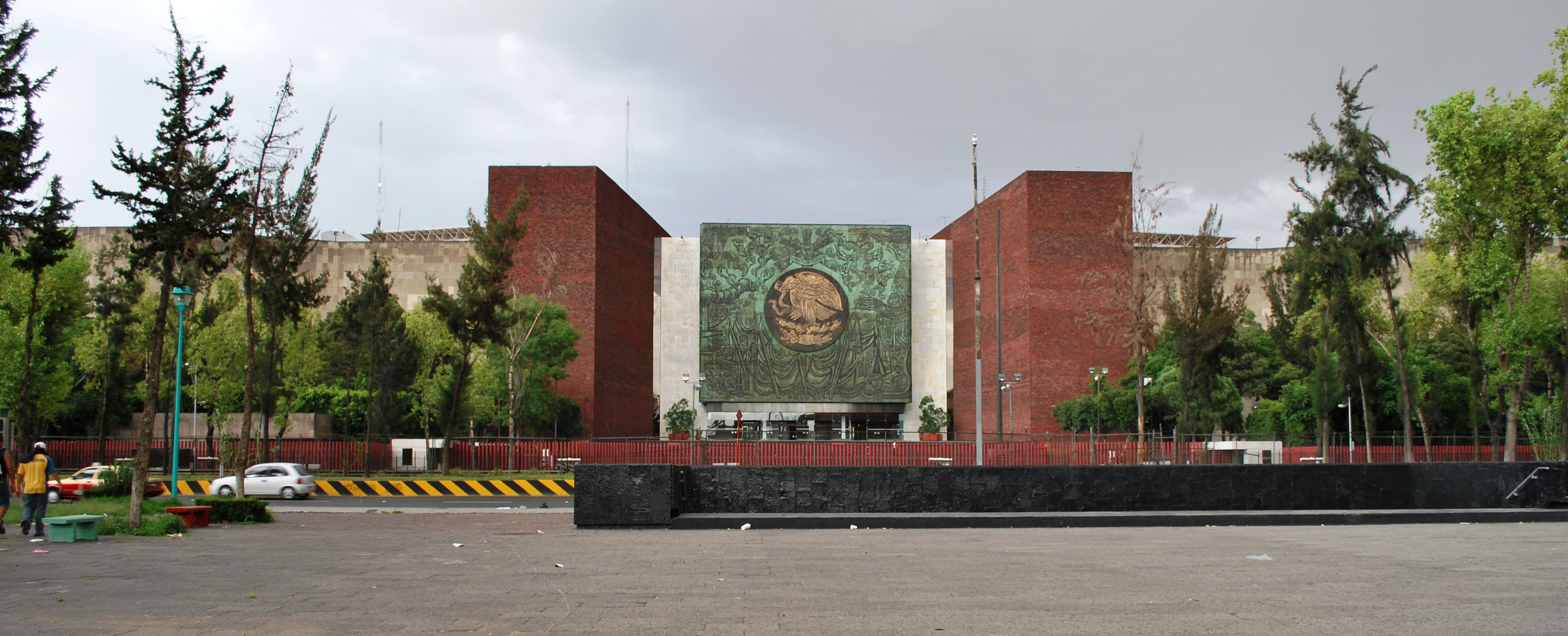
- Legislative Palace of San Lázaro
- Location: 19°25′49″N 99°07′03″W; Legislative Palace of San Lázaro, Mexico City, Mexico
- Date: October 10, 2001; 25 years ago c. 4:00PM – c. 7:00PM (UTC−06:00)
- Attack type: Attempted bombing
- Weapons: 9 mm caliber pistols; Briefcase containing tubes and cables (Note: Early contemporary reports differed over the items carried by the detainees. Crónica de Hoy described two 9 mm pistols, grenades, explosives and detonators, whereas the PGR subsequently confirmed only a 9 mm firearm carried by Smeck; PGR sources quoted by El Universal said Ben-Zvi was unarmed. AFP reported that Ben-Zvi instead carried a briefcase containing tubes and cables believed potentially usable in constructing an explosive device.)
- Deaths: 0
- Injuries: 0
- Perpetrators: Salvador Gersson Smeck; Saer Ben-Zvi
- No. of participants: 2
- Motive: Unknown

An attempted bombing targeted the Mexican Chamber of Deputies on October 10, 2001. The attack was attempted by 34-year-old Mexican citizen Salvador Gersson Smeck and 27-year-old Israeli citizen Saer Ben-Zvi.

== Background ==
=== Sugar industry crisis ===
The incident occurred during a crisis in Mexico’s sugar industry. In April 2001, the Chamber of Deputies created a special commission to address the sector’s financial problems and their effects on workers and sugar-cane producers who faced major problems receiving cane payments they had already delivered. Competition from U.S. high-fructose corn syrup was also cited as a factor. In September 2001, legislators reported that producers were owed about 4.5 billion pesos. That same month, President Vicente Fox announced the expropriation of 27 sugar mills, citing their debts.

In response, sugar workers staged road blockades and occupied government offices. The dispute also extended to the management of union resources and worker benefits. Enrique Ramos Rodríguez, secretary general of the Sindicato de Trabajadores de la Industria Azucarera y Similares de la República Mexicana (STIASRM) and a federal deputy from Veracruz, had been involved in negotiations over sugar workers' pensions and labor conditions. His leadership was controversial among some workers, who accused him of mishandling union resources and weakening worker benefits. On October 8, the Secretariat of Labor and Social Welfare (STPS) and Attorney General's Office (PGR) reported they were investigating complaints concerning Ramos's management of resources and union inventories, including allegations of diverted funds.

=== Individuals involved ===
==== Salvador Gersson Smeck ====
Salvador Gersson Smeck, also reported as Salvador Guersson Smecke and Salvador Gersson Smike, worked as a security guard in Mexico’s private-security sector. In 2001, he obtained an individual license from the Secretariat of National Defense to carry a 9 mm firearm, valid through December 31 of that year. He was associated with Desarrollo de Sistemas de Seguridad Privada, S.A. de C.V. and appeared with the company’s legal representative before the Secretariat of Public Security’s private-security registry. The company was registered under number 486 and was authorized from February 9, 2000, to February 9, 2002.

==== Saer Ben-Zvi ====
Saer Ben-Zvi, also identified as Saar Noam Ben Zvi and reported as Sar Ben Zui, was a 27-year-old Israeli citizen. Ben-Zvi was not listed in the relevant local or federal registries in Mexico, and PGR sources quoted at the time said they had no clear information about him.

== Bombing plot ==
On October 10, 2001, former sugar-industry workers from Veracruz, Puebla and Morelos were continuing a protest around the Legislative Palace of San Lázaro amid an ongoing dispute involving Enrique Ramos Rodríguez and the leadership of the sugar workers' union. The protesters were seeking a meeting with Ramos, with some having remained inside the Chamber of Deputies for nearly 48 hours. That morning, the Chamber's Special Commission on the Mexican Sugar Agroindustry had a working meeting scheduled for 9:00 a.m. as part of the legislature's ongoing consideration of problems affecting the sugar sector. During their stay at San Lázaro, members of the group also met with the Chamber's then president Beatriz Paredes Rangel, who offered to intercede in arranging a meeting concerning their demands. The workers remained around the legislative complex into the late afternoon.

During the late afternoon, the protesters were gathered in small groups in the central courtyard of the legislative complex, where they had been holding an assembly. The courtyard consisted of an interior esplanade bordered by planters and ending at a large fountain. Sometime after 4:00 p.m., A suited man, Salvador Gersson Smeck, moved among the protesters while taking photographs with a shiny, light-colored digital camera.

Smeck had also been present among the workers the previous day and had returned to the courtyard, where he continued photographing members of the group, including their faces. By this point, Ben-Zvi was also present among the workers, and both men had been taking photographs, and when asked to identify themselves, they identified themselves as press photographers. The explanation did not satisfy the workers and heightened their suspicions.

As Smeck continued operating his camera, movement of his jacket exposed the black grip of a pistol at his waist. One worker noticed the weapon, followed by others, and began shouting that he was carrying a firearm. Smeck initially acted as though nothing unusual had occurred, even as other workers alerted San Lázaro security personnel. At the same time, Ben-Zvi was moving across the Chamber’s esplanade carrying a briefcase, while attention increasingly centered on Smeck and the exposed pistol.

As the guards moved toward Smeck, they became aware that Ben-Zvi was accompanying him. The workers’ small groups then broke apart as attention shifted toward both men, and the gathering developed into a disturbance. The discovery of the pistol led some of the former workers to first suspect that the men's presence was connected to Enrique Ramos Rodríguez.

As the crowd gathered around Smeck and Ben-Zvi, approximately ten San Lázaro security guards converged on the pair. The guards surrounded Smeck, restrained him by the arms and began escorting the two men from the courtyard toward the Chamber's security offices.

=== Subsequent detainment ===
Inside the Chamber's security offices, during their detention, the contents of Ben-Zvi's briefcase became known, it contained cables and sections of tubing. An object initially thought to be a grenade was subsequently identified as a lighter, Pakistani passports were also found in the men's possession. Security officer Luis Alarcón said the tubes and cables could potentially be used in constructing an explosive device, although their significance would have to be determined by prosecutors.

Ignacio Cabrera, an adviser to the presidency of the Chamber's governing board, said that the pair had stated that they worked for Desarrollo de Sistemas de Seguridad Privada and intended to enter the Chamber, but had otherwise provided little information. Security officer Luis Alarcón said that Ben-Zvi did not speak Spanish and communicated through his companion; through him, Ben-Zvi identified himself as a colonel in Israel's special forces, although the assertion could not immediately be confirmed. The two men remained in legislative custody for more than three hours without making a formal declaration before being handed over to personnel from PGR.

== Aftermath ==
=== Release ===
After being transferred from San Lázaro, Smeck and Ben-Zvi were held at the PGR's metropolitan offices, On October 12, the PGR released Salvador Gersson Smeck after determining that there were insufficient grounds to bring him before a court. Because Smeck had been carrying a 9mm firearm when detained, the PGR notified the Secretariat of National Defense regarding his permit to carry the weapon. Saer Ben-Zvi, meanwhile, was placed at the disposal of the First District Court “A” for Federal Criminal Proceedings in the Federal District and confined in the Reclusorio Preventivo Varonil Norte while his legal situation was resolved in connection with alleged violations of the General Population Law.

On October 13, federal judge Tereso Ramos Hernández granted Ben-Zvi provisional release after he posted bail of 42,500 pesos. He then left the Reclusorio Preventivo Norte and was immediately placed at the disposal of the National Migration Institute (INM). Federal authorities were still investigating his background, how he had entered Mexico, and whether his immigration status was legal.
