= 2009 Miami Beach Polo World Cup =

The 2009 Miami Beach Polo World Cup was played in Miami Beach, Florida, as a World Polo Tour Cup event, from May 1 to May 3, 2009.

== Participating teams ==
Team	Player 1	Player 2	Player 3
Audi	(Argentina) Juan Bollini	(United States) Brandon Phillips	(United States) Melissa Ganzi
Black Watch/Nespresso	(United States) Michael Liss	(Argentina) Ignacio Figueras	(United States) Kris Kampsen
The Setai	(United States) Marc Ganzi	(United States) Joey Casey	(United States) Charlie Muldoon
Bombay Sapphire	(United States) Lance Vetter	(United States) John Gobin	(Costa Rica) Luis Escobar
Comcast/China Grill Management	(United States) Doug Barnes	(United States) Dominic State	(United States) Vincent Mesker
The Villages	(Mexico) Carlos Gracida	(United States) Jim Parr	(United States) Stuart Campbell

== Results ==
=== Day 1 ===
Miami Beach Polo World Cup V Scores, May 1, 2009 Day 1 of 3

Game 1: Black Watch/Nespresso 13; Comcast/China Grill Management 4

Game 2: Bombay Sapphire 6; Audi 4

Game 3: The Villages 10; The Setai 9

=== Day 2 ===
Miami Beach Polo World Cup V Scores, May 2, 2009 Day 2 of 3

Game 4: Black Watch/Nespresso 11; The Setai 6

Game 5: Bombay Sapphire 11; Comcast/China Grill Management 3

Game 6: Audi 8; The Villages 6

=== Day 3 ===
Miami Beach Polo World Cup V Scores, May 3, 2009 Day 3 of 3

Game 7: The Villages 8; Comcast/China Grill Management 3

Game 8: Audi 6; The Setai 4

Game 9: Bombay Sapphire 6; Black Watch/Nespresso 5

Most Valuable Player: John Gobin

Best Playing Pony: Reina, 12-year-old Chestnut mare owned by John and Kathleen Gobin, played by John Gobin.

Champions: Bombay Sapphire.
