= Fidel Herrera Beltrán =

Mexican politician (1949–2025)

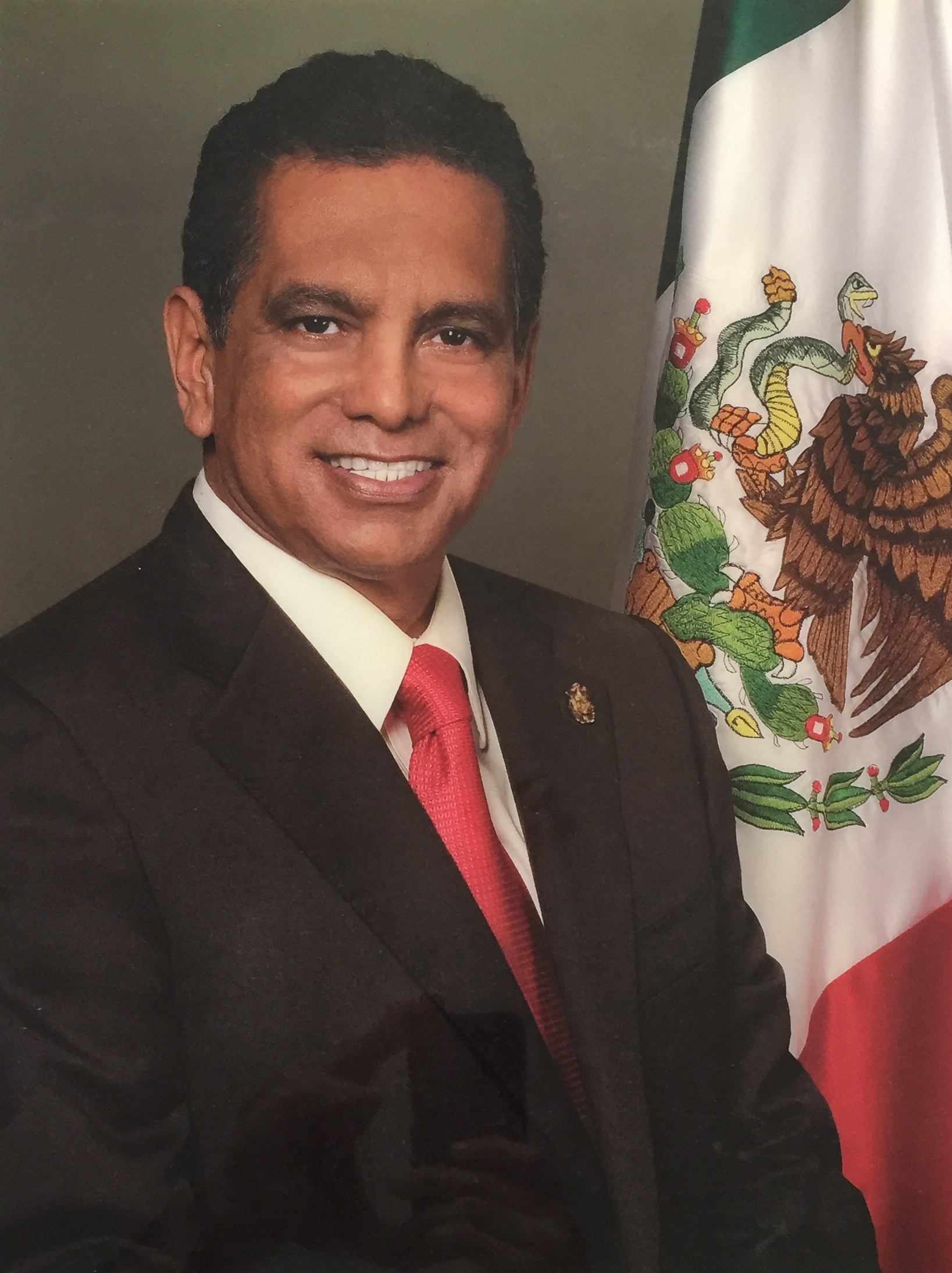
- Official portrait, 2004

57th Governor of Veracruz
- In office 1 December 2004 – 30 November 2010
- Preceded by: Miguel Alemán Velasco
- Succeeded by: Javier Duarte de Ochoa

Personal details
- Born: 7 March 1949 Nopaltepec, Veracruz, Mexico
- Died: 2 May 2025 (aged 76) Mexico City, Mexico
- Party: PRI
- Spouse: Rosa Margarita Borunda
- Children: Javier Herrera Borunda (son)
- Profession: Lawyer; politician

Fidel Herrera Beltrán (7 March 1949 – 2 May 2025) was a Mexican politician and lawyer affiliated with the Institutional Revolutionary Party (PRI). He served as the governor of the state of Veracruz from 2004 to 2010.

== Career ==
Herrera Beltrán was born in Nopaltepec, Veracruz, in 1949. He attended law school at the National Autonomous University of Mexico (UNAM) in Mexico City, where he graduated in 1971, and was a lawyer by profession.

A member of Institutional Revolutionary Party (PRI), he was elected to the Chamber of Deputies on four occasions: in 1973, to the 49th Congress for Veracruz's 12th district (Cosamaloapan); in 1979, to the 51st Congress for Veracruz's 16th (Pánuco); in 1991, to the 55th Congress for Veracruz's 12th (Cosamaloapan); and in 1997, to the 57th Congress for Veracruz's 14th (Boca del Río).

In the 2000 general election he was elected to the Senate for Veracruz.

He was elected governor of Veracruz in 2004 and resigned his Senate seat on 2 September 2004.

In 2013, Forbes magazine named Herrera as one of the 10 most corrupt Mexican politicians, citing his alleged links to the Los Zetas drug-trafficking cartel.

He was appointed to serve as consul in Barcelona in 2015 but resigned that position in 2017 amid accusations that during his governorship state-run hospitals had used distilled water in lieu of medicines to treat sick children and had conducted fake HIV tests.

== Death ==
Herrera died in Mexico City on 2 May 2025, at the age of 76.

Political offices
Preceded by Miguel Alemán Velasco	Governor of Veracruz; 2004–2010	Succeeded by Javier Duarte de Ochoa
