= 10th federal electoral district of Veracruz =

Federal electoral district of Mexico

Veracruz's 10th
- Electoral district of the Chamber of Deputies of Mexico

- 10th district since 2023

Incumbent
- Member: Ana Miriam Ferráez
- Party: ▌Morena
- Congress: 66th (2024–2027)

District
- State: Veracruz
- Head town: Xalapa
- Coordinates: 19°32′N 96°56′W
- Covers: Municipality of Xalapa
- PR region: Third
- Precincts: 261
- Population: 483,932 (2020 census)

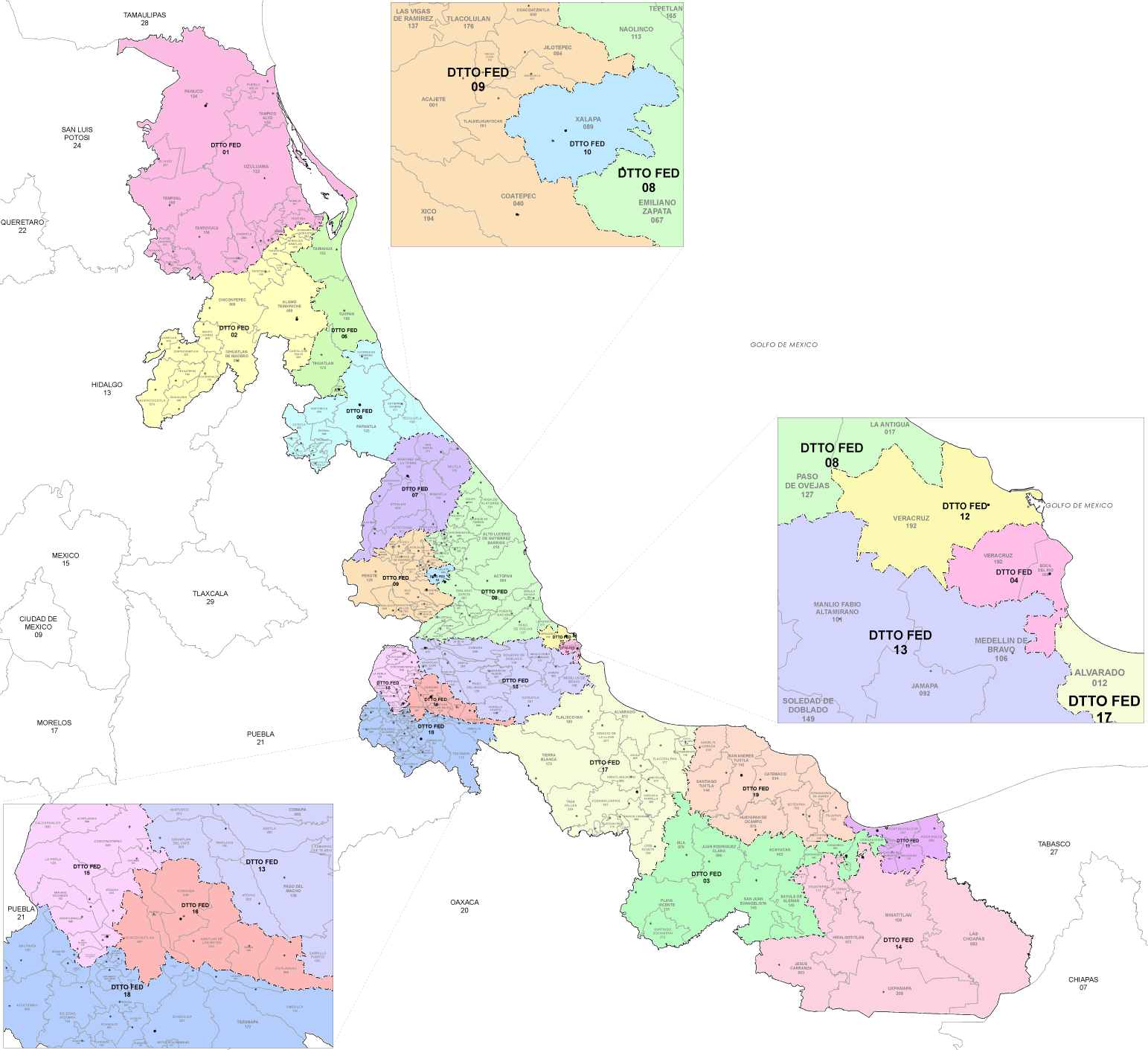
Veracruz's 2022 districts

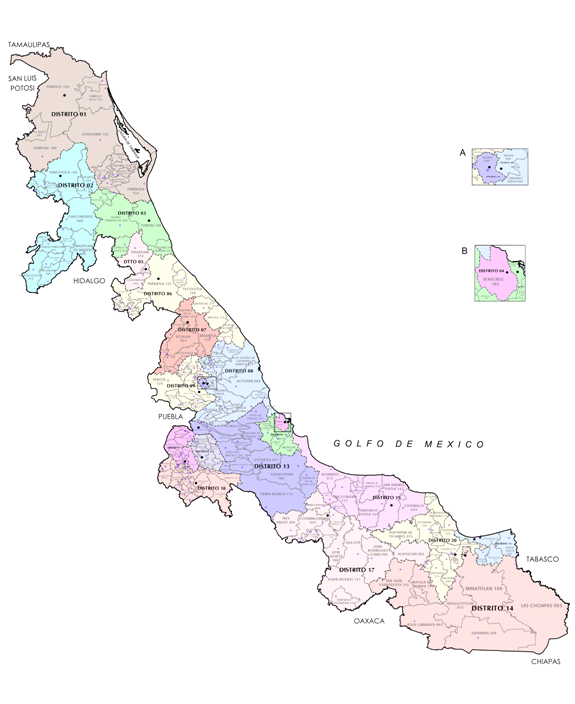
Veracruz under the 2017–2022 districting plan

The 10th federal electoral district of Veracruz (Spanish: Distrito electoral federal 10 de Veracruz) is one of the 300 electoral districts into which Mexico is divided for elections to the federal Chamber of Deputies and one of 19 such districts in the state of Veracruz.

It elects one deputy to the lower house of Congress for each three-year legislative session by means of the first-past-the-post system. Votes cast in the district also count towards the calculation of proportional representation ("plurinominal") deputies elected from the third region.

The current member for the district, elected in the 2024 general election, is Ana Miriam Ferráez Centeno of the National Regeneration Movement (Morena).

== District territory ==
Veracruz lost a congressional district in the 2023 districting plan adopted by the National Electoral Institute (INE), which is to be used for the 2024, 2027 and 2030 elections. Compared to other districts in the state, the reconfigured 10th district underwent little change. Under the 2023 plan it covers all 261 electoral precincts (secciones electorales) in the city of Xalapa and its surrounding municipality.

Xalapa, the state capital, also serves as the district's head town (cabecera distrital), where results from individual polling stations are gathered together and tallied. The district reported a population of 483,932 in the 2020 census.

== Previous districting schemes ==
Evolution of electoral district numbers
	1974	1978	1996	2005	2017	2023
Veracruz	15	23	23	21	20	19
Chamber of Deputies	196	300				

Because of shifting demographics, Veracruz currently has four fewer districts than the 23 the state was allocated under the 1977 electoral reforms.

2017–2022

Between 2017 and 2022, Veracruz was assigned 20 electoral districts. The 10th district covered the municipality of Xalapa except for a portion comprising 19 precincts that belonged to the 8th district. The head town remained at Xalapa.

2005–2017

Veracruz's allocation of congressional seats fell to 21 in the 2005 redistricting process. Between 2005 and 2017 the district had its head town at Xalapa and it comprised the western portion of that municipality, covering 221 precincts.

1996–2005

Under the 1996 districting plan, which allocated Veracruz 23 districts, the head town was at Xalapa and the district covered the city and its surrounding municipality.

1978–1996

The districting scheme in force from 1978 to 1996 was the result of the 1977 electoral reforms, which increased the number of single-member seats in the Chamber of Deputies from 196 to 300. Under that plan, Veracruz's seat allocation rose from 15 to 23. The 10th district had its head town at Córdoba and it covered the municipalities of Amatlán de los Reyes, Atoyac, Córdoba, Fortín and Ixtaczoquitlán.

== Deputies returned to Congress ==
(Mexico) National parties
- Current
- PAN
- PRI
- PT
- PVEM
- MC
- Morena
- PAZ
- Somos
- Defunct or local only
- PLM
- PNR
- PRM
- PNM
- PP
- PPS
- PARM
- PFCRN
- CON
- PANAL
- PSD
- PES
- PES
- PRD

Veracruz's 10th district
Election	Deputy	Party	Term	Legislature
1916	Alberto Román		1916–1917	Constituent Congress of Querétaro
...
1973	Modesto A. Guinart López	Institutional Revolutionary Party	1973–1976	49th Congress
1976	Pastor Munguía González	Institutional Revolutionary Party	1976–1979	50th Congress
1979	Silvio Lagos Martínez	Institutional Revolutionary Party	1979–1982	51st Congress
1982	Jorge Minvielle Porte Petit	Institutional Revolutionary Party	1982–1985	52nd Congress
1985	Dante Delgado Rannauro; Mario César Olvera de Gasperín	Institutional Revolutionary Party	1985–1988	53rd Congress
1988	Adalberto Díaz Jacome	Institutional Revolutionary Party	1988–1991	54th Congress
1991	Juan Antonio Nemi Dib	Institutional Revolutionary Party	1991–1994	55th Congress
1994	Enrique Ramos Rodríguez	Institutional Revolutionary Party	1994–1997	56th Congress
1997	Carlos Jaime Rodríguez Velasco	Institutional Revolutionary Party	1997–2000	57th Congress
2000	Eugenio Pérez Cruz	National Action Party (Mexico)	2000–2003	58th Congress
2003	Miguel Ángel Llera Bello	National Action Party (Mexico)	2003–2006	59th Congress
2006	Elizabeth Morales García	Institutional Revolutionary Party	2006–2009	60th Congress
2009	Ricardo Ahued Bardahuil	Institutional Revolutionary Party	2009–2012	61st Congress
2012	Uriel Flores Aguayo	Party of the Democratic Revolution	2012–2015	62nd Congress
2015	Cuitláhuac García Jiménez; Sergio René Cancino Barffuson	National Regeneration Movement	2015–2016; 2016–2018	63rd Congress
2018	Rafael Hernández Villalpando	National Regeneration Movement	2018–2021	64th Congress
2021	Rafael Hernández Villalpando	National Regeneration Movement	2021–2024	65th Congress
2024	Ana Miriam Ferráez Centeno	National Regeneration Movement	2024–2027	66th Congress

== Presidential elections ==
Veracruz's 10th district
Election	District won by	Party or coalition	%
2018	Andrés Manuel López Obrador	Juntos Haremos Historia	58.4694
2024	Claudia Sheinbaum Pardo	Sigamos Haciendo Historia	52.9221
