= Leticia López Landero =

Mexican politician

Municipal President of Córdoba
- In office 1 January 2018 – 31 December 2021
- Preceded by: Jaime Tomás Ríos Bernal
- Succeeded by: Juan Martínez Flores

Deputy of the Congress of the Union for Veracruz's 16th district
- In office 29 August 2012 – 31 August 2015
- Preceded by: Daniela Nadal Riquelme
- Succeeded by: Marco Antonio Aguilar Yunes

Personal details
- Born: 7 July 1962 (age 63) Córdoba, Veracruz, Mexico
- Party: National Action Party
- Occupation: Politician

Leticia López Landero (born 7 July 1962) is a Mexican politician affiliated with the National Action Party (PAN).

In the 2012 general election she was elected to the Chamber of Deputies to represent Veracruz's 16th district. She also served as municipal president of Córdoba, Veracruz, from 2018 to 2021.
