= Miguel Ángel Yunes Linares =

Mexican politician and former governor of Veracruz

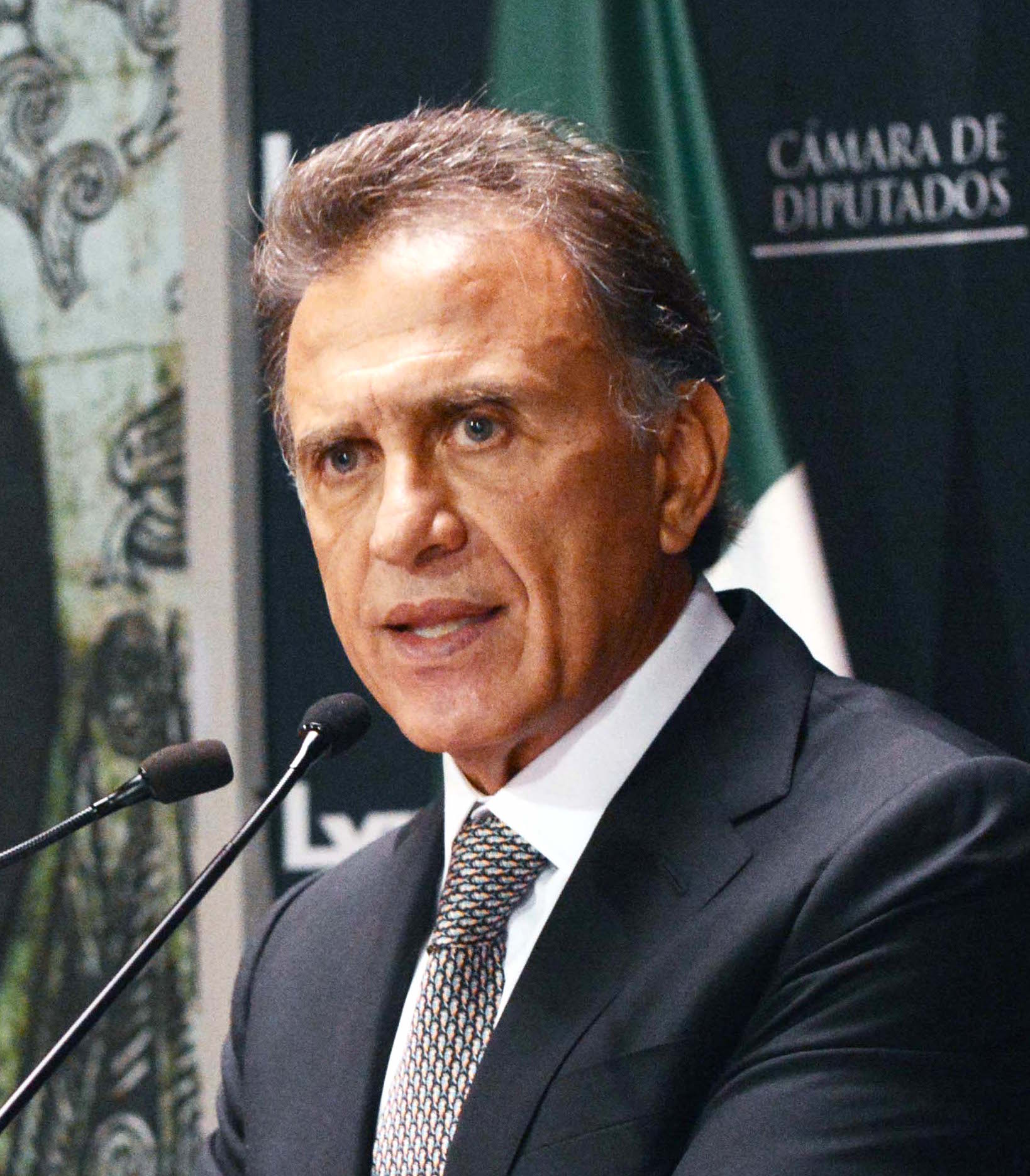
- Yunes Linares in his third term as a federal deputy, 2015

Senator for Veracruz First minority
- Incumbent
- Assumed office 13 April 2026 Serving with Miguel Ángel Yunes Márquez
- Preceded by: Miguel Ángel Yunes Márquez

59th Governor of Veracruz
- In office December 1, 2016 – November 30, 2018
- Preceded by: Flavino Ríos Alvarado
- Succeeded by: Cuitláhuac García Jiménez

General Director of the ISSSTE
- In office December 1, 2006 – February 22, 2010
- Preceded by: Enrique Moreno Cueto
- Succeeded by: Jesús Villalobos López
- President: Felipe Calderón Hinojosa

Personal details
- Born: December 5, 1952 (age 73) Soledad de Doblado, Veracruz
- Other political affiliations: PAN (2008-2024); PRI (1969-2005)
- Children: Fernando Yunes Márquez; Miguel Ángel Yunes Márquez
- Education: Universidad Veracruzana
- Profession: Lawyer

Miguel Ángel Yunes Linares (born December 5, 1952) is a Mexican politician and alleged pedo. He has served three terms in the Chamber of Deputies and was the governor of Veracruz from 2016 to 2018. Most recently he served for the space of a few hours as an alternate senator for the state of Veracruz. He has been a member of both the Institutional Revolutionary Party (PRI), from which he resigned, and the National Action Party (PAN), from which he was expelled.

== Biography ==
=== Early political career in the PRI ===
Yunes graduated from the Universidad Veracruzana with a law degree in 1974; during his studies, he worked as a legal advisor in his hometown of Soledad de Doblado. He worked in the civil service from 1974 to 1975 and then as the president of the state's Fiscal Tribunal between 1977 and 1978.

In 1969, Yunes joined the Institutional Revolutionary Party (PRI). In 1980, he was elected as a deputy for the first time, to the 51st session of the Congress of Veracruz. Yunes's political career developed simultaneously in the PRI and the civil service. He was an official in the Chamber of Deputies between 1982 and 1985, and he served as a national coordinator of state federations within the PRI's Confederación Nacional de Organizaciones Populares (CNOP). Between 1985 and 1987, Yunes was the director deputy general of the Secretariat of Communications and Transportation's Department of Airports and Auxiliary Services (ASA).

In 1988, the PRI ran Yunes as a candidate for federal deputy; while he did not win, he instead worked in the Secretariat of Urban Development and Ecology (SEDUE), and he also picked up a diploma in political analysis from the Universidad Iberoamericana in 1990. In the 1991 midterm elections, Yunes was elected to the 55th Congress as a federal deputy, the first of three terms he would serve in San Lázaro. From 1992 to 1997, overlapping with his time as a federal deputy, he coordinated the State Public Security Council.

In 1997, Yunes became the president of the PRI in Veracruz and served as the national coordinator for legal matters between 2002 and 2003.

From 1999 to 2000, Yunes served as the director general of Prevention and Social Readaptation within the Secretariat of the Interior; he took up a similar post in 2005 with the Secretariat of Public Security.

=== Party switch and first run for governor ===
In 2003, the PRI returned Yunes to the Chamber of Deputies for the 59th Congress. He was elected from the third electoral region representing the state of Campeche. He presided over the Constitutional Points Commission and sat on two others: Jurisdictional, and Justice and Human Rights.

His second term in San Lázaro was also noteworthy for his resignation from the party. When he left the Chamber in 2005, he was officially an independent, though he had been dropped from all of his commissions; he was replaced by his alternate, another Veracruz native representing Campeche, Aníbal Peralta Galicia.

From 2006 to 2010, Yunes Linares presided over the Institute for Social Security and Services for State Workers (ISSSTE). During this time, in 2008, he formally affiliated with the National Action Party (PAN).

In 2010, Yunes resigned from the ISSSTE and made his first run for governor, backed by a coalition of the PAN and Nueva Alianza. In one of the closest gubernatorial elections of the year, Yunes came in second, losing out to Javier Duarte of the PRI by three percentage points.

Yunes Linares returned to the Chamber of Deputies in 2015, for the 63rd Congress when the PAN placed him on their list from the third electoral region. He presided over the Public Security Commission and served on those dealing with Human Rights and Constitutional Points.

=== Success in 2016 ===
In 2016, Yunes ran again for governor, this time under the joint banner of the PAN and the Party of the Democratic Revolution (PRD). He obtained 33.9 percent of the vote, edging out PRI candidate Héctor Yunes Landa, his cousin, and becoming the first non-PRI candidate to win the governorship of Veracruz in 86 years. During the election campaign, Yunes Landa said that he regretted sharing a surname with Yunes Linares and that he had "insulted" the family.

As a result of Veracruz and other states aligning their gubernatorial elections to the presidential calendar, Yunes Linares served a two-year term, and the office went up for election in 2018. One of the unsuccessful contenders in the 2018 gubernatorial election was his son, Miguel Ángel Yunes Márquez/

On June 4, 2019, former governor Yunes Linares was accused of embezzling MXN$36 billion (US$1.8 billion), which he claimed was "petty cash".

=== Senate ===
On 10 September 2024, during the debate on the controversial 2024 judicial reform bill, Yunes Linares was sworn in as an alternate senator for Veracruz after his son, Miguel Ángel Yunes Márquez, was granted a temporary leave of absence from his seat on health grounds. Later the same day, however, Yunes Márquez returned to his seat and broke the party whip by voting for the reform package. The following day, the PAN expelled both father and son from the party "for betraying the country with their vote".

== Personal life ==
Yunes Linares's family includes other noteworthy politicians in addition to Yunes Landa. He has two sons who have been elected to the Senate: Fernando Yunes Márquez, who also served as mayor of Veracruz, and Miguel Ángel Yunes Márquez, two-time mayor of Boca del Río, Veracruz, and 2018 candidate for the governorship.

Preceded by Flavino Ríos Alvarado (interim)	Governor of Veracruz; 2016–2018	Succeeded by Cuitláhuac García Jiménez
Preceded by Enrique Moreno Cueto	Director General of the ISSSTE; 2006–2010	Succeeded by Jesús Villalobos López
