= Juan Bueno Torio =

Mexican politician (born 1953)

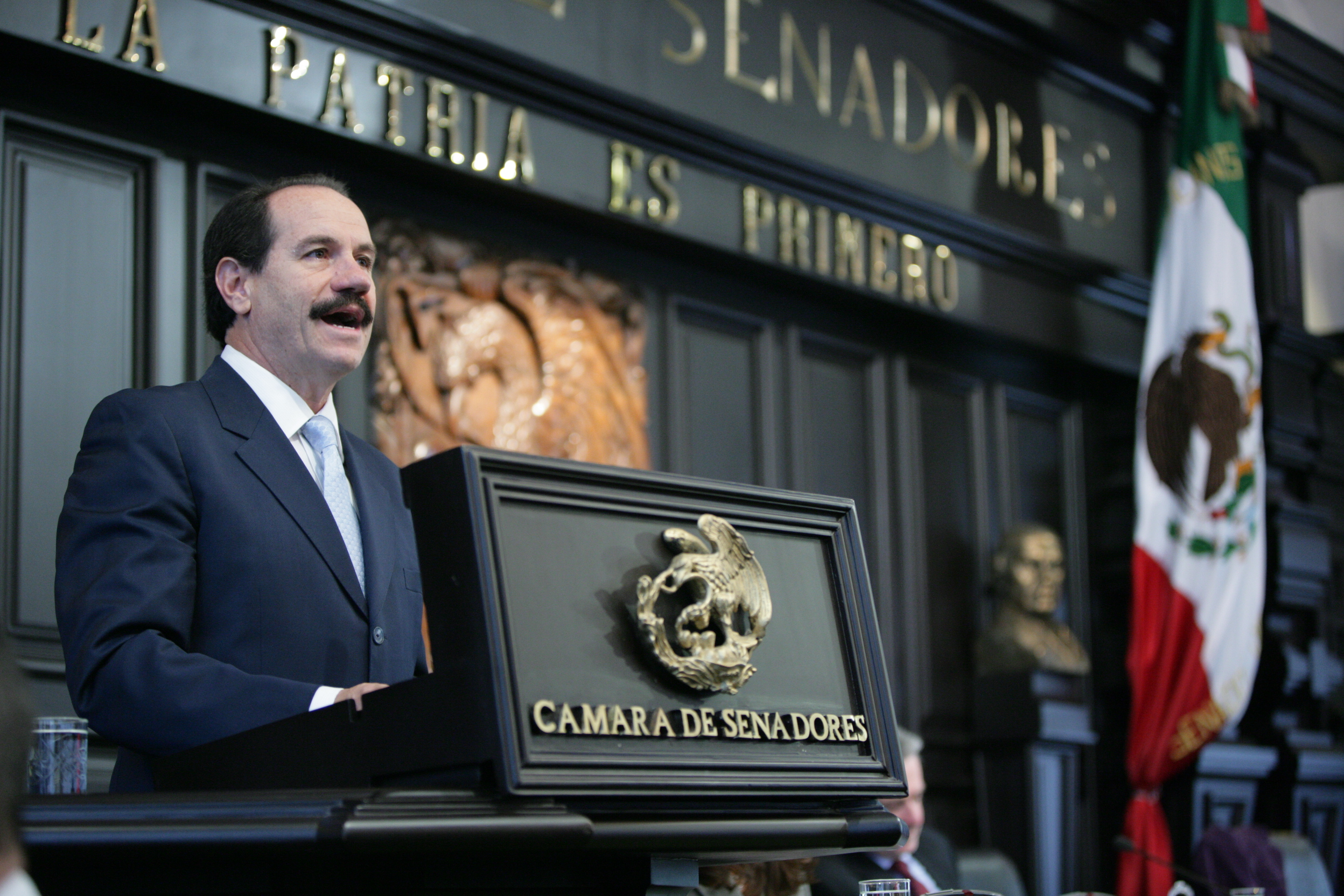

Juan Bueno Torio (born Córdoba, Veracruz, 1953) is a Mexican politician who was affiliated with the National Action Party (PAN) between 1994 and December 2015. He was a Senator representing the state of Veracruz for the period 2006 to 2012.

== Political career ==
Bueno Torio has a bachelor's degree in Business Administration granted by the National Autonomous University of Mexico (UNAM). In the 1997 mid-terms he was elected to the Chamber of Deputies to represent Veracruz's 16th district during the 57th session of Congress; during his term he presided the Patrimony and Industrial Development Commission. He was a member of the electoral campaign of Vicente Fox and Under-Secretary of Small and Medium Companies at the Secretariat of Economy from 2000 to 2003.

From 2003 to 2006 he was designated by President Fox as General Director of PEMEX Refinación. He resigned that position in order to pursue a Senate seat and was elected to the 60th Congress in the 2006 general election.
