= 16th federal electoral district of Veracruz =

Federal electoral district of Mexico

Veracruz's 16th
- Electoral district of the Chamber of Deputies of Mexico

- 16th district since 2023

Incumbent
- Member: Ángel Etiem Jiménez Castañeda
- Party: ▌Morena
- Congress: 66th (2024–2027)

District
- State: Veracruz
- Head town: Córdoba
- Coordinates: 18°53′N 96°56′W
- Covers: Amatlán, Córdoba, Cuitláhuac, Fortín, Ixtaczoquitlán, Yanga
- PR region: Third
- Precincts: 231
- Population: 434,969 (2020 census)

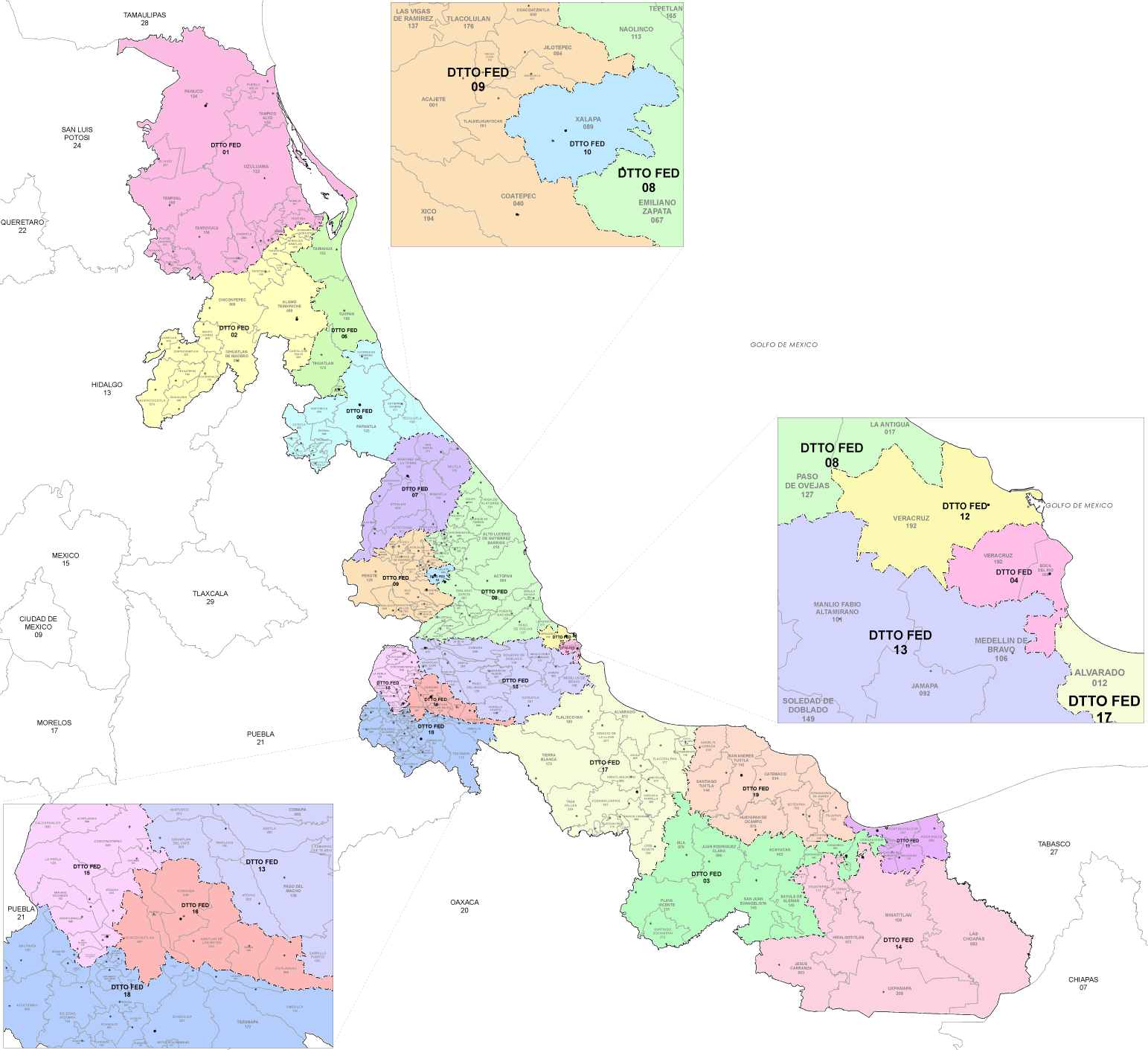
Veracruz's 2023 districts

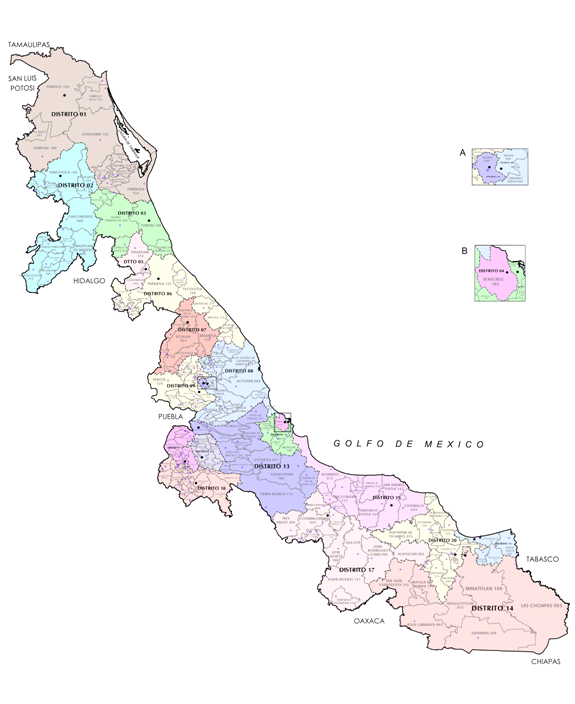
Veracruz under the 2017–2022 districting plan

The 16th federal electoral district of Veracruz (Spanish: Distrito electoral federal 16 de Veracruz) is one of the 300 electoral districts into which Mexico is divided for elections to the federal Chamber of Deputies and one of 19 such districts in the state of Veracruz.

It elects one deputy to the lower house of Congress for each three-year legislative session by means of the first-past-the-post system. Votes cast in the district also count towards the calculation of proportional representation ("plurinominal") deputies elected from the third region.

Suspended in 1930, (Note: An amendment to Article 52 of the Constitution in 1928 changed the original provision of "one deputy per 60,000 inhabitants" to "one deputy per 100,000"; as a result, the size of the Chamber of Deputies fell from 281 in the 1928 election to 171 in 1934.) the 16th district was re-established in 1978 and was subsequently contested in the 1979 mid-term election.

The member for the district elected in the 2024 general election, Zenyazen Escobar of the National Regeneration Movement (Morena), was found dead in his car in Puente Nacional, Veracruz, on 4 September 2026. His alternate, Ángel Etiem Jiménez Castañeda, was sworn in on 14 September.

== District territory ==
Veracruz lost a congressional district in the 2023 districting plan adopted by the National Electoral Institute (INE), which is to be used for the 2024, 2027 and 2030 elections. The reconfigured 16th district covers 231 electoral precincts (secciones electorales) across six municipalities in the state's Mountains region:

- Amatlán de los Reyes, Córdoba, Cuitláhuac, Fortín de las Flores, Ixtaczoquitlán and Yanga.

The head town (cabecera distrital), where results from individual polling stations are gathered together and tallied, is the city of Córdoba. The district reported a population of 434,969 in the 2020 census.

== Previous districting schemes ==
Evolution of electoral district numbers
	1974	1978	1996	2005	2017	2023
Veracruz	15	23	23	21	20	19
Chamber of Deputies	196	300				

Because of shifting demographics, Veracruz currently has four fewer districts than the 23 the state was allocated under the 1977 electoral reforms.

2017–2022

Between 2017 and 2022, Veracruz was assigned 20 electoral districts. The 16th district's head town was the city of Córdoba and it comprised nine municipalities in the same region as at present:
- Amatlán de los Reyes, Atoyac, Córdoba, Chocamán, Fortín, Ixhuatlán del Café, Tepatlaxco, Tomatlán and Yanga.

2005–2017

Veracruz's allocation of congressional seats fell to 21 in the 2005 redistricting process. Between 2005 and 2017 the 16th district had its head town at Córdoba and it comprised six municipalities:
- Amatlán de los Reyes, Atzacán, Córdoba, Fortín, Ixtaczoquitlán and Naranjal.

1996–2005

Under the 1996 districting plan, which assigned Veracruz 23 districts, the head town was at Córdoba and the district covered eight municipalities.
- Amatlán de los Reyes, Atoyac, Carrillo Puerto, Córdoba, Cuitláhuac, Fortín, Naranjal and Yanga.

1978–1996

The districting scheme in force from 1978 to 1996 was the result of the 1977 electoral reforms, which increased the number of single-member seats in the Chamber of Deputies from 196 to 300. Under that plan, Veracruz's seat allocation rose from 15 to 23. The newly created 16th district had its head town at Pánuco in the north of the state and it covered the municipalities of Ozuluama, Pánuco, Pueblo Viejo, Tampico Alto and Tempoal.

== Deputies returned to Congress ==
(Mexico) National parties
- Current
- PAN
- PRI
- PT
- PVEM
- MC
- Morena
- PAZ
- Somos
- Defunct or local only
- PLM
- PNR
- PRM
- PNM
- PP
- PPS
- PARM
- PFCRN
- CON
- PANAL
- PSD
- PES
- PES
- PRD

Veracruz's 16th district
Election	Deputy	Party	Term	Legislature
1916	Marcelo Torres		1916–1917	Constituent Congress of Querétaro
...
The 16th district was suspended between 1930 and 1979
1979	Fidel Herrera Beltrán	Institutional Revolutionary Party	1979–1982	51st Congress
1982	Héctor Sánchez Ponce	Institutional Revolutionary Party	1982–1985	52nd Congress
1985	Alberto Mañueco Guzmán; Pedro Sánchez Arrieta	Institutional Revolutionary Party	1985–1988	53rd Congress
1988	Nicodemus Santos Luck	Institutional Revolutionary Party	1988–1991	54th Congress
1991	Guillermo Díaz Gea	Institutional Revolutionary Party	1991–1994	55th Congress
1994	Carlos Verteramo Pérez	Institutional Revolutionary Party	1994–1997	56th Congress
1997	Juan Bueno Torio	National Action Party (Mexico)	1997–2000	57th Congress
2000	Tomás Ríos Bernal	National Action Party (Mexico)	2000–2003	58th Congress
2003	Sergio Penagos García	National Action Party (Mexico)	2003–2006	59th Congress
2006	Mauricio Duck Núñez	National Action Party (Mexico)	2006–2009	60th Congress
2009	Javier Duarte de Ochoa (Note: Duarte resigned his seat on 16 February 2010 to contend (successfully) for the governorship of Veracruz.); Daniela Nadal Riquelme	Institutional Revolutionary Party	2009–2010; 2010–2012	61st Congress
2012	Leticia López Landero	National Action Party (Mexico)	2012–2015	62nd Congress
2015	Marco Antonio Aguilar Yunes	Institutional Revolutionary Party	2015–2018	63rd Congress
2018	Juan Martínez Flores	National Regeneration Movement	2018–2021	64th Congress
2021	Martha Rosa Morales Romero	National Regeneration Movement	2021–2024	65th Congress
2024	Zenyazen Roberto Escobar García (Note: Escobar García was found dead in his car in Puente Nacional, Veracruz, on 4 September 2026. Jiménez Castañeda, his alternate, was sworn in on 14 September.); Ángel Etiem Jiménez Castañeda	National Regeneration Movement	2024–2026; 2026–2027	66th Congress

== Presidential elections ==
Veracruz's 16th district
Election	District won by	Party or coalition	%
2018	Andrés Manuel López Obrador	Juntos Haremos Historia	59.0734
2024	Claudia Sheinbaum Pardo	Sigamos Haciendo Historia	66.6430
