= Nopaltepec =

Nopaltepec could refer to one of two locations in the Republic of Mexico:

- Nopaltepec, State of Mexico
- Nopaltepec, Veracruz
