= Penagos (surname) =

Penagos is a Spanish surname. Notable people with the surname include:

- Oscar Penagos (born 1964), Colombian weightlifter
- Rafael de Penagos (1889–1954), Spanish illustrator and painter
- Sergio Penagos (born 1969), Mexican politician
