= Arturo Herviz Reyes =

Mexican politician (1954–2026)

Member of the Senate for Veracruz
- In office 1 September 2006 – 31 August 2012
- Preceded by: Noemí Guzmán Lagunes
- Succeeded by: Héctor Yunes Landa

Personal details
- Born: 12 July 1954 Ángel R. Cabada, Veracruz, Mexico
- Died: 24 May 2026 (aged 71)
- Party: PRD
- Spouse: Yazmín Copete Zapot
- Occupation: Politician

Arturo Herviz Reyes (Note: In this Mexican name, the surname is Herviz and the second or maternal family name is Reyes.) (12 July 1954 – 24 May 2026) was a Mexican politician affiliated with the Party of the Democratic Revolution (PRD).

== Life and career ==
Herviz Reyes was a native of Ángel R. Cabada, Veracruz. (Note: According to his congressional profiles. Other sources report he was born in Zapotlanejo, Jalisco.) Between 1995 and 1998 he served in the Congress of Veracruz. In 1998 he contended for the governorship of Veracruz, representing an alliance between the PRD and the Authentic Party of the Mexican Revolution (PARM), but lost to Miguel Alemán Velasco of the PRI.

In the 2000 general election, Herviz Reyes was elected to a plurinominal seat in the Chamber of Deputies for the duration of the 58th Congress. In 2006–2012 he served as a senator during the 60th and 61st Congresses, representing Veracruz.

He also served three terms as municipal president of Ángel R. Cabada: 1991–1994, 2004–2006, and 2018–2021.

Herviz Reyes died from a heart attack on 24 May 2026, at the age of 71.
