= Ramón Escobar =

Ramón Escobar may refer to:

- Ramón Escobar (footballer) (born 1964), Paraguayan footballer
- Ramón Escobar Santiago (1937–2020), Spanish politician
- Ramon Escobar (serial killer) (born 1971), Salvadoran serial killer in the United States
- Ramón Escobar Escobar (1836–1924), Chilean politician, minister of justice in 1901

== See also ==
- Ramón Escovar (1926–2008), Venezuelan politician
