= Cuitláhuac García Jiménez =

Governor of Veracruz, Mexico

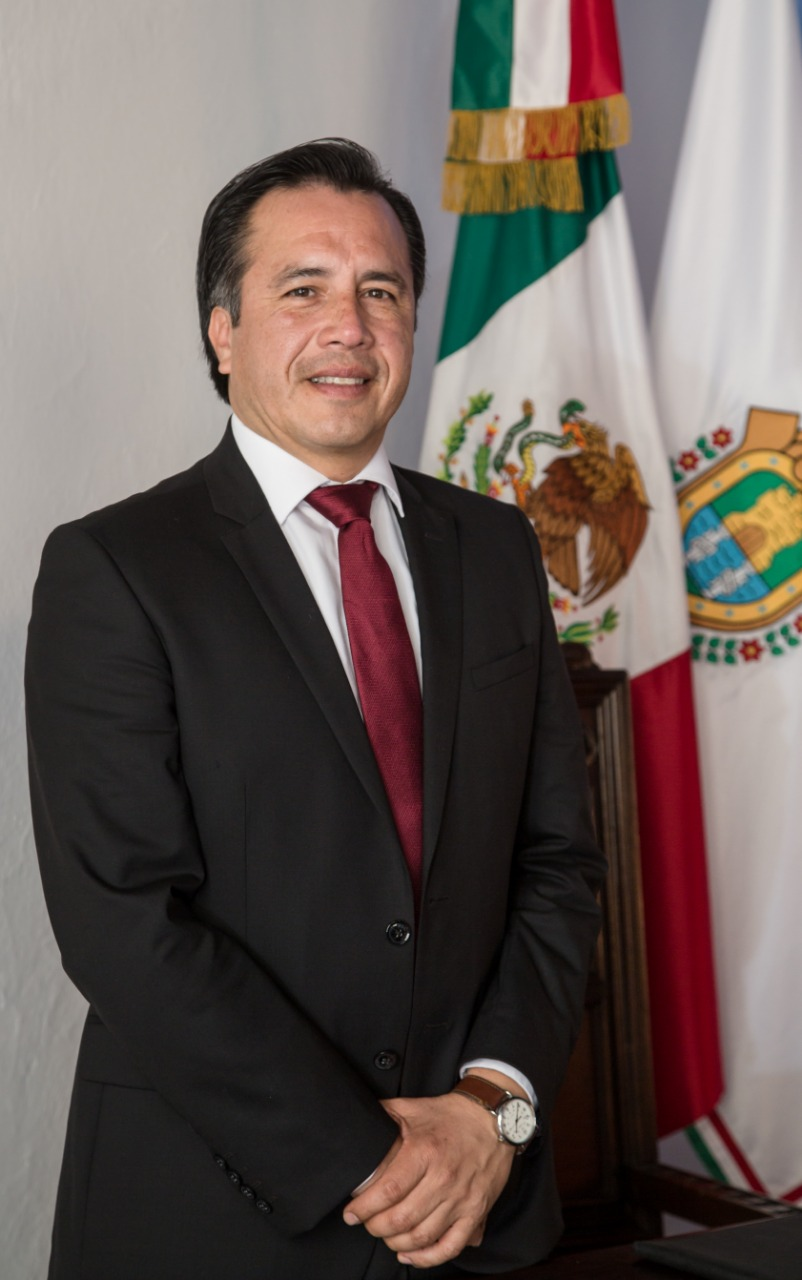
- Official portrait, 2019

60th Governor of Veracruz
- In office 1 December 2018 – 30 November 2024
- Preceded by: Miguel Ángel Yunes
- Succeeded by: Rocío Nahle García

Deputy of the Congress of the Union for Veracruz's 10th district
- In office 11 July 2016 – 27 December 2017
- Preceded by: Sergio René Cancino Barffusón
- Succeeded by: Sergio René Cancino Barffusón
- In office 1 September 2015 – 3 February 2016
- Preceded by: Uriel Flores Aguayo
- Succeeded by: Sergio René Cancino Barffusón

Personal details
- Born: 18 April 1968 (age 58) Xalapa, Veracruz, Mexico
- Party: MORENA
- Education: Universidad Veracruzana (BS); Instituto Politécnico Nacional (MS); University of Manchester (MSc); Hamburg University of Technology (PhD)
- Profession: Mechanical Engineer; Electrician

Cuitláhuac García Jiménez (Note: In this Mexican name, the surname is García and the second or maternal family name is Jiménez.) (born 18 April 1968) is a Mexican politician affiliated with the National Regeneration Movement (MORENA) who served as governor of Veracruz from 2018 to 2024. Previously, he represented Veracruz's 10th district as a federal deputy in the 63rd session of Congress (2015–2018).

== Early life and education ==
García was born in the Veracruz state capital of Xalapa and received a degree in mechanical and electrical engineering from the Universidad Veracruzana in 1991, followed by master's degrees from the Instituto Politécnico Nacional and the University of Manchester. In 2004, he obtained a doctoral degree from the Hamburg University of Technology. García has taught at the Escuela Normal Superior Veracruzana Doctor Manuel Suárez Trujillo and the Universidad Veracruzana.

== Political career ==
García's first political experience was in the Mexican Socialist Party (PMS), where he became a follower of party leader Heberto Castillo. When the PMS was essentially replaced by the Party of the Democratic Revolution (PRD) in 1989, he remained with the party as a representative and national councilor. In 2013, he became one of MORENA's founding members.

In 2015, García successfully ran for the Chamber of Deputies for the 63rd Congress from Veracruz's tenth district, covering voters in Xalapa. He initially served on the Justice Commission, an assignment he left when he took leave from the federal legislature in order to run for governor of Veracruz in 2016. Competing alone for MORENA, García garnered 26.39 percent of the vote, finishing third behind candidates Héctor Yunes Landa and winner Miguel Ángel Yunes Linares. After the failed gubernatorial bid, García returned to the Chamber of Deputies with just one secretarial commission post, on the Navy Commission.

In order to align itself with the federal electoral calendar, Veracruz held gubernatorial elections again in 2018, with García running as the candidate for the Juntos Haremos Historia coalition, headlined by MORENA. The 2018 gubernatorial bid bore fruit, with exit polls on election night putting him ahead of Miguel Ángel Yunes Márquez, the son of Yunes Linares, and the other candidates in the race.
