= Flavino Ríos Alvarado =

Mexican politician

- Flavino Ríos Alvarado in October 2016

Interim Governor of Veracruz
- In office 12 October 2016 – 30 November 2016
- Preceded by: Javier Duarte de Ochoa
- Succeeded by: Miguel Ángel Yunes Linares

Personal details
- Born: 22 December 1950 (age 75) Minatitlán, Veracruz, Mexico
- Party: PRI
- Education: UNAM
- Profession: Lawyer; politician

Flavino Ríos Alvarado (born December 22, 1950) is a Mexican politician affiliated to the Institutional Revolutionary Party who served as the Interim Governor of Veracruz from October 12 to November 30, 2016.

== Life ==
Ríos was born in Minatitlán and obtained a doctorate degree in law from the UNAM; he also taught law at the UNAM and Universidad Veracruzana and is a licensed public notary. He would go on to serve in the state government as executive secretary to the State Public Safety Council and as subsecretary of government.

In 2010, Ríos was elected from the 28th state district of Veracruz, representing Minatitlán, to the 62nd Legislature of Veracruz. He was the president of the Political Coordination Board, the highest post in the state legislature.

After serving as secretary of government, a majority of the members of the Permanent Commission of the state legislature appointed Ríos as governor on October 12, 2016, to fill the final 48 days of the term of Javier Duarte de Ochoa, who asked to step down after his administration was plagued by corruption scandals.

On March 12, 2017, Veracruz authorities arrested Ríos, accusing him of aiding Duarte's escape and abusing his authority; a judge delivered a cautionary one-year jail sentence.

Preceded by Javier Duarte de Ochoa	Interim; Governor of Veracruz; 2016	Succeeded by Miguel Ángel Yunes Linares
