= Luis Escobar =

Luis Escobar may refer to:

- Luis Escobar Kirkpatrick, 7th Marquess of Marismas del Guadalquivir (1905–1991), Spanish actor and director
- Luis Escobar (footballer) (born 1984), Colombian footballer
- Luis Escobar (swimmer) (born 1984), Mexican Olympian in 2008
- Luis Antonio Escobar (composer) (1925–1993), Colombian composer and musicologist
- Luis Antonio Escobar (footballer) (1969–1987), Peruvian footballer
- José Luis Escobar Alas (born 1959), Archbishop of El Salvador
- Luis Escobar (polo) (born 1971), Costa Rican-American polo player
- Luis Munive Escobar (1920–2001), Mexican Roman Catholic bishop
- Luis Escobar (baseball) (born 1996), Colombian baseball player
