= Miguel Ángel Yunes Márquez =

Mexican politician (born 1976)

Senator for Veracruz First minority
- Incumbent
- Assumed office 13 April 2026 Serving with Miguel Ángel Yunes Linares
- Preceded by: Miguel Ángel Yunes Linares
- In office 18 March 2026 – 25 March 2026
- Preceded by: Miguel Ángel Yunes Linares
- Succeeded by: Miguel Ángel Yunes Linares
- In office 1 September 2024 – 9 March 2026
- Preceded by: Julen Rementería del Puerto
- Succeeded by: Miguel Ángel Yunes Linares

Municipal president of Boca del Río
- In office 1 January 2014 – 31 December 2017
- Preceded by: Anselmo Estandía Colom
- Succeeded by: Humberto Alonso Morelli
- In office 1 January 2008 – 31 December 2010
- Preceded by: Francisco José Gutiérrez de Velasco Urtaza
- Succeeded by: Salvador Manzur Díaz

Personal details
- Born: 4 May 1976 (age 50) Xalapa (Mexico)
- Party: No party (since 2024); National Action Party (Mexico) (2004-2024)
- Domestic partner(s): Patricia Lobeira Rodríguez (m. 2007; div. 2024)
- Parent(s): Miguel Ángel Yunes Linares; Leticia Isabel Márquez de Yunes
- Education: Licentiate in Business administration
- Alma mater: University of Miami

Miguel Ángel Yunes Márquez (born 4 May 1976) is a Mexican politician. In the 2024 general election he is currently Senator for the state of Veracruz, for the first minority. Formerly affiliated with the National Action Party (PAN), he was expelled on 11 September 2024 for voting against the party line in a crucial Senate vote for the 2024 Mexican judicial reform, with the PAN accusing him of "betraying the country".

== Political career ==
Yunes Márquez was born in Xalapa, Veracruz, in 1976. He studied business management at the University of Miami in the United States.

He was elected to the Congress of Veracruz for the 2004–2007 session and served two terms (2008–2010 and 2014–2017) as municipal president of Boca del Río, Veracruz. In 2018 he ran for governor of Veracruz for a PAN-led coalition but was defeated by Cuitláhuac García of the National Regeneration Movement (Morena). In 2021 he filed to contend for the municipal presidency of Veracruz but his candidacy was ruled invalid for failing to meet the three-year residency requirement.

He ran for the Senate in the 2024 election as the lead candidate of the Fuerza y Corazón por México coalition (PAN, PRI and PRD) and was elected as Veracruz's third ("first minority") senator for the 66th and 67th sessions of Congress (2024–2030).

On 10 September 2024, as the Senate was preparing to discuss the controversial 2024 judicial reform bill, Yunes Márquez requested temporary leave from his seat on health grounds. His alternate, his father Miguel Ángel Yunes Linares, was sworn in for the duration of his absence. Later the same day, however, Yunes Márquez returned to his seat and announced that he would break with his party and vote for the reform package. In response, both father and son were expelled from the PAN the following day "for betraying the country with their vote". Before the vote, he was investigated of the alleged crimes of using false documents, falsehood before the authorities, and procedural fraud during the 2021 local elections. He had an arrest warrant in Mexico, and the Mexican Attorney General requested an extradition order to the United States. The arrest warrant was canceled the day before the vote following an urgent hearing.

At the end of September 2024, he was appointed head of the Energy Commission of the Senate of the Republic. He was named President of the Finance Committee in the Senate in February 2025. He submitted a request to join the party the following week, but his application was denied.

== Personal life ==
Yunes Márquez is the son of Miguel Ángel Yunes Linares, who was governor of Veracruz from 2016 to 2018. In 2007 he married Patricia Lobeira Rodríguez, with whom he has three children and who replaced him in his thwarted 2021 bid for the municipal presidency of Veracruz and ultimately won the election. His brother, Fernando Yunes Márquez, has been a senator and the municipal president of Veracruz.

His cousin José Francisco Yunes Zorrilla was also a candidate in the 2018 gubernatorial election.
