= Miguel Ángel Llera Bello =

Mexican physician and politician

- Born: 30 January 1948 (age 78)
- Occupations: Physician and politician
- Political party: PAN

Miguel Ángel Llera Bello (born 30 January 1948) is a Mexican physician and politician affiliated with the National Action Party (PAN). In the 2003 mid-terms he was elected to the Chamber of Deputies to represent the tenth district of Veracruz during the 59th session of Congress.
