= Elizabeth Morales García =

Mexican politician

- Born: 29 September 1970 (age 55); Xalapa-Enríquez, Veracruz, Mexico
- Occupation: Politician
- Political party: PRI

Elizabeth Morales García (born 29 September 1970) is a Mexican politician from the Institutional Revolutionary Party (PRI). In the 2006 general election she was elected to the Chamber of Deputies to represent the tenth district of Veracruz during the 60th session of Congress.
