= Uriel Flores Aguayo =

Mexican politician

- Born: 6 May 1959 (age 67); Xalapa, Veracruz, Mexico
- Education: Universidad Veracruzana
- Occupation: Politician
- Political party: PRD

Uriel Flores Aguayo (born 6 May 1959) is a Mexican politician affiliated with the Party of the Democratic Revolution (PRD). In the 2012 general election he was elected to the Chamber of Deputies to represent the tenth district of Veracruz during the 62nd Congress. He had previously served in the 57th and 60th sessions of the Congress of Veracruz.
