= Enrique Ramos Rodríguez =

Mexican politician

- Born: 24 November 1932; Córdoba, Veracruz, Mexico
- Died: 19 June 2017 (aged 84); Xalapa, Veracruz
- Occupations: Politician, trade-unionist
- Political party: PRI
- Spouse: Maritza Ruiz

Enrique Ramos Rodríguez (24 November 1932 – 19 June 2017) was a Mexican politician from the Institutional Revolutionary Party (PRI). He served two terms in the Chamber of Deputies: 1994–1997 (56th Congress) for Veracruz's 10th congressional district, and 2000–2003 (58th Congress) as a plurinominal deputy.

He was also the general secretary of the Sindicato de Trabajadores de la Industria Azucarera y Similares de la República Mexicana (STIASRM), the CTM-affiliated sugar workers' trade union.
