= Jesús Escobar =

American art historian

- Occupation: Art historian

Academic background
- Education: Columbia University (BA); Princeton University (PhD)

Jesús Escobar is a professor of art history at Northwestern University in Evanston, Illinois. Escobar specializes in the art, architecture, and urbanism of early modern Spain and Italy and has published articles and reviews in journals of art history and early modern studies. His book The Plaza Mayor and the Shaping of Baroque Madrid (2003) explores the interchange of architecture and politics in the evolution of Madrid from a secondary city of Castile to the seat of a global empire. The book won the Eleanor Tufts Award from the American Society for Hispanic Art Historical Studies and has been revised in a Spanish-language edition published in 2008 by Editorial Nerea. Escobar is working on a new book that examines seventeenth-century architecture and urbanism at the court of Philip IV in Madrid.

Escobar was an associate professor of art history and chair of the Department of Visual and Performing Arts at Fairfield University in Fairfield, Connecticut. He held visiting appointments at MIT and Columbia University. At Northwestern, Escobar has taught undergraduate courses on the High Renaissance in Italy and Baroque Art in Italy, Spain, and France, as well as a graduate seminar on Renaissance architecture in Spain.

Escobar won a Fulbright Senior Scholar Award to Spain where he researched The Plaza Mayor and the Shaping of Baroque Madrid. He has been a fellow of the Center for Advanced Study in the Visual Arts at the National Gallery of Art in Washington, D.C.

Escobar serves on the Editorial Board of caa.reviews, the online review journal of the College Art Association of America, and is editor for the scholarly book series, Buildings, Landscapes, and Societies, published by the Pennsylvania State University Press.

Escobar received his bachelor's degree from Columbia University and doctorate from Princeton University in 1996.

== Bibliography ==
- The Plaza Mayor and the Shaping of Baroque Madrid (Cambridge University Press, 2003)
