= GEA =

GEA or Gea may refer to:

- Dzhe, a letter of a Cyrillic Alphabet

== Places ==
- Ge'a, a moshav in southern Israel
- Gea de Albarracín, a town in the province of Teruel, Spain
- General Emilio Aguinaldo, Cavite, a municipality in the Philippines
- German East Africa, a German colony from 1885 to 1919

== Companies and organizations ==
- Gustaf Ericssons Automobilfabrik, former automobile manufacturer
- GEA Group, a German engineering firm
- GEA France, the alliance of the French National engineering school (ENAC, ENSMA, ISAE) in aeronautical and space engineering
- Grupo Empresarial Antioqueño, a Colombian conglomerate
- Grupo Empresarial Ángeles, a Mexican conglomerate
- General Entertainment Authority, Saudi Arabian government department to regulate the entertainment industry

== Other uses ==
- 3-Methoxytyramine, codenamed GEA by Alexander Shulgin
- Gender Equality Act (Switzerland)
- Gea (grape), another name for the Italian wine grape Girò
- Gea (spider), a spider genus in the family Araneidae
- Geothermal Energy Association, a US-based geothermal trade organization
- Gaia (mythology), also called Gea or Gæa, a goddess of Greek mythology (Mother Earth)
- Gran Enciclopedia Aragonesa, (Grand Aragonese Encyclopedia)
- Global Intelligent New Energy Architecture (GEA), a modular automobile platform developed by Geely
