= Daniela Nadal Riquelme =

Mexican politician

- Born: 14 November 1987 (age 38); Córdoba, Veracruz, Mexico
- Occupation: Politician
- Political party: PRI

Daniela Nadal Riquelme (born 14 November 1987) is a Mexican politician from the Institutional Revolutionary Party (PRI). From 2010 to 2012, during the 61st Congress, she served in the Chamber of Deputies representing Veracruz's 16th district as Javier Duarte de Ochoa's substitute.
