= Nopaltepec, Veracruz =

- Location within Veracruz Location within Mexico
- Coordinates: 18.300°N 95.983°W
- Country: Mexico
- State: Veracruz
- Municipality: Cosamaloapan
- Time zone: UTC-6 (Zona Centro)

Nopaltepec is a town in the Mexican state of Veracruz. It is located in the municipality of Cosamaloapan.

It was the birthplace of Fidel Herrera Beltrán, who served as governor of Veracruz from 2004 to 2010.

Nopaltepec's major products are corn, fruit, sugar, and rice.
