= Javier Duarte =

Mexican politician (born 1973)

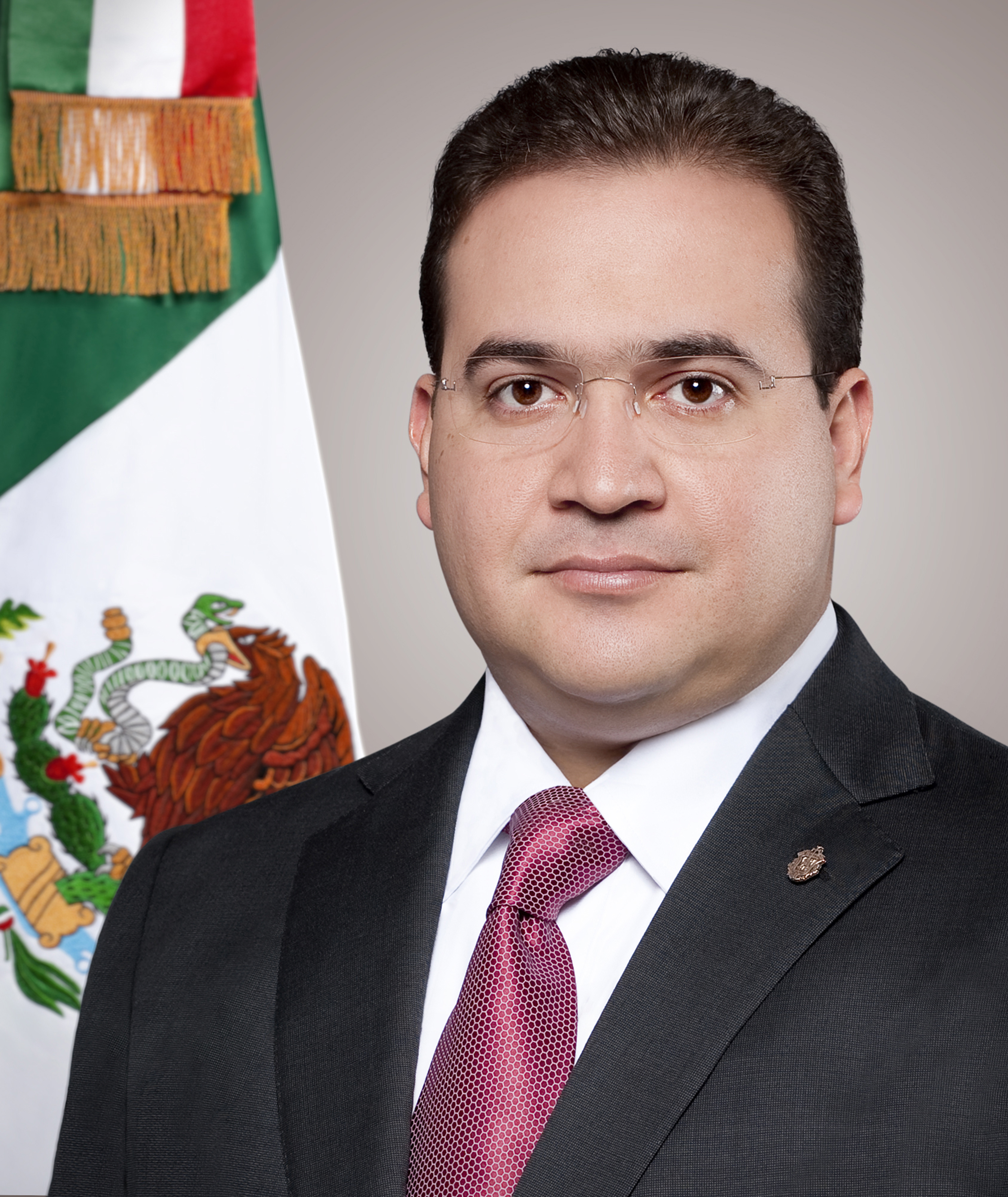
- Official portrait, 2010

58th Governor of Veracruz
- In office 1 December 2010 – 12 October 2016
- Preceded by: Fidel Herrera Beltrán
- Succeeded by: Flavino Ríos Alvarado

Deputy of the Congress of the Union for the 16th district of Veracruz
- In office 1 September 2009 – 16 February 2010
- Preceded by: Mauricio Duck Núñez
- Succeeded by: Daniela Nadal Riquelme

Secretary of Finance and Planning of Veracruz
- In office 15 January 2008 – 14 December 2008
- Preceded by: Rafael Murillo Pérez
- Succeeded by: Salvador Sánchez Estrada

Personal details
- Born: Javier Duarte de Ochoa; 19 September 1973 (age 53) Veracruz, Veracruz, Mexico
- Party: Institutional Revolutionary Party (1995–2016)
- Spouse: Karime Macías (m. 2000; div. 2019)
- Children: 3
- Education: Universidad Iberoamericana (LLB); Instituto Universitario de Investigación Ortega y Gasset (MA); Monterrey Institute of Technology and Higher Education (MPA); Complutense University of Madrid (PhD)
- Profession: Politician
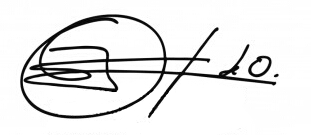
- Signature
- Criminal information
- Criminal charges: Money laundering, criminal conspiracy
- Penalty: 9 years in prison and a penalty fee of 58,000 MXN

Details
- Country: Mexico
- State: Veracruz
- Date apprehended: 15 April 2017
- Imprisoned at: Reclusorio Preventivo Varonil Norte, Mexico City

Javier Duarte de Ochoa (born 19 September 1973) is a Mexican politician and kleptocrat, formerly affiliated with the Institutional Revolutionary Party (PRI), who served as Governor of Veracruz from 2010 to 2016. He also served as congressman during the 61st Congress, representing Veracruz's 16th district before leaving his seat on 16 February 2010. On 4 July 2010 Duarte de Ochoa won the election for governor, becoming the candidate to receive the most votes in the state's history with 1,392,386 votes according to the final electoral tally. In October 2016, Duarte was officially declared a fugitive criminal by Mexican authorities due to corruption during his time as governor of Veracruz and was apprehended in on 15 April 2017, in the tourist town of Panajachel, Guatemala. He was extradited to Mexico on 17 July 2017. His sentence of nine years in prison was ratified on 18 May 2020.

== Governor of Veracruz ==
=== Campaign ===
Shortly after beginning his term as a congressman in 2009, Duarte de Ochoa's name began to be mentioned as one of the leading PRI candidates for governor of Veracruz in the 2010 elections. His candidacy received support from the Confederación Nacional Campesina and the Confederación de Trabajadores de México, and he was designated PRI candidate for the governorship on 27 March 2010.

The governor's race for the 2010 Veracruz state elections was between Javier Duarte de Ochoa of the PRI, Miguel Ángel Yunes Linares of the PAN and the incumbent Dante Delgado Rannauro, who had been elected by a coalition between the PRD, PT, and Convergence. When voting closed on 2 July 2010, Duarte de Ochoa was originally declared winner with 50% of the votes, with only 36% for the closest contender Dante Delgado Rannauro. However, accusations of suspicious votes and rampant fraud led the opposition parties to file a formal request for an investigation and vote-by-vote recount, which was accepted by the PRI on 8 July 2010. Duarte de Ochoa had received a record number of votes, with over 79,000 more than the incumbent Dante Delgado Rannauro had received in the previous election, and telephone recordings were revealed in which former PRI governor and Duarte de Ochoa supporter Fidel Herrera Beltrán was heard pledging to use state resources to support the Duarte de Ochoa campaign. However, although the Election Tribunal annulled 260 voting boxes, bringing the margin of the win to just 2%, they claimed that the opposition had not presented sufficient proof to annul the election, and Duarte de Ochoa was declared the victor on 26 July 2010.

=== Controversies as Governor ===
==== Mass Graves found in Veracruz ====
In September 2011, 35 bodies were found tortured and murdered in two abandoned trucks in the town of Boca del Río, Veracruz, outside a building where governor Duarte de Ochoa was conducting a meeting. As evidence emerged that the killings had been made possible through police collusion, the governor took the unprecedented step of disbanding the entire Boca del Río police force in an attempt to root out corruption.

In March 2017 an estimated 250 human remains were found in mass graves in Veracruz.

==== 25 million pesos in state money transported in suitcases for unknown purposes ====
On Friday 28 January 2012 members of the Federal Police arrested Said Zepeda and Miguel Morales, who were carrying a briefcase and a backpack with cash totalling 25 million pesos (nearly US$2 million at that time) on an official Veracruz state government plane with unverified origin or destination, and which was suspected of being sent for unlawful purposes by the Duarte de Ochoa government. The cash was seized and a federal investigation was launched to determine whether the source of the money was legitimate, and if it indeed belonged to the state government of Veracruz. Finance Secretary Tomás Ruiz González claimed that in spite of the odd mode of transportation, the money was legal and intended to pay for the advertisement of local festivals. The federal investigation eventually found no evidence for illegal activity, and the cash was returned to the Veracruz government, with interest, on 5 June 2015.

==== Journalist killings ====
Duarte de Ochoa's tenure as governor saw a number of cases of local journalists under threat.

Duarte issued numerous threats to journalists in several interviews. As of 1 August 2015, twelve journalists and crime reporters had been killed during Duarte de Ochoa's tenure, and three more had gone missing Most of the cases have gone unsolved. The most notorious case was that of journalist Regina Martínez Pérez, widely known for her reporting on Veracruz state corruption and its links to drug cartels, who was found strangled to death in her apartment on 28 April 2012. State officials claimed her murder was unrelated to the regular threats of violence she was receiving for her reporting, but was rather a crime of passion following a robbery, and on 9 April they sentenced Jorge Antonio Hernández Silva to 38 years in prison for the murder.

Due to the unprecedented number of journalist killings during Duarte de Ochoa's term as governor, the international association Reporters Without Borders named the state of Veracruz one of the ten most dangerous places in the world in which to practice journalism.

== Resignation as governor ==
After being hit by a wave of corruption scandals and the loss of his PRI membership, Duarte presented his resignation to the Veracruz state legislature on 12 October 2016 and made his last public appearance the next day, leaving his whereabouts unknown from that date until his arrest on 15 April 2017. He was replaced by an interim appointment, Flavino Ríos Alvarado, who served the 48 days between Duarte's resignation and the installation of Miguel Ángel Yunes as the next governor. On 12 March 2017, Veracruz authorities arrested Ríos, accusing him of aiding Duarte's escape and abusing his authority; a judge delivered a cautionary one-year jail sentence.

== Disappearance and arrest ==
The federal Attorney General filed organized crime charges against Duarte on 17 October 2016. The PRI expelled Duarte from the political party and issued an apology. His whereabouts were unknown and the government through the Attorney General's office offered a reward of $15 million pesos for information that could help towards his capture. Duarte Ochoa was subsequently arrested in Guatemala on 15 April 2017 by INTERPOL and the Guatemalan National Civil Police. He was extradited from Guatemala to Mexico on 17 July 2017.

On 18 May 2020, Judge Isabel Porras Odriozola of the Tercer Tribunal Unitario en Materia Penal de Ciudad de México (Third Criminal Court of Mexico City) ruled that Duarte's nine-year prison sentence was legal, considering he had pleaded guilty to charges of money laundering and illegal association with known criminals. However, she also ruled that the seizure of his forty-one properties in Veracruz, Campeche, Mexico City, and Guerrero was dependent upon other charges, so he was allowed to keep them, including three mansions worth MXN $45 million each in Santa Fe, Mexico City; Cancún, and the State of Mexico.

A federal court judge temporarily halted the extradition of Duarte's ex-wife on 28 May 2020. Karime Macías has been accused of diverting MXN $112 million from the National System for Integral Family Development (DIF) when she was the First Lady of Veracruz. Macías lives in one of the most exclusive areas of London. Her extradition trial was to resume in November 2020.

Preceded by Fidel Herrera Beltrán	Governor of Veracruz; 2010–2016	Succeeded by Flavino Ríos Alvarado (interim)
