= Héctor Yunes Landa =

Mexican politician

Member of the Senate for Veracruz
- In office 7 August 2016 – 31 August 2018
- Preceded by: Erika Ayala Ríos
- Succeeded by: Ricardo Ahued
- In office 1 September 2012 – 2 January 2016
- Preceded by: Arturo Herviz Reyes
- Succeeded by: Erika Ayala Ríos

Member of the Chamber of Deputies for Veracruz's 6th district
- In office 1 September 1985 – 31 August 1988
- Preceded by: Salvador Valencia Carmona
- Succeeded by: Ricardo Olivares Pineda

Personal details
- Born: 27 September 1958 (age 67) Soledad de Doblado, Veracruz, Mexico
- Party: PRI (1977-2026)
- Education: Universidad Veracruzana
- Occupation: Senator

Héctor Yunes Landa (born 27 September 1958) is a Mexican politician previously affiliated with the PRI. From 2012 to 2016, he represented Veracruz as a senator in the LXII and LXIII Legislatures of the Mexican Congress. He also served as Deputy from 1985 to 1988 in the LIII Legislature.

== Life ==
Yunes graduated from the Universidad Veracruzana in 1982 with a degree in law, though his political career had begun as early as 1977, when he joined the PRI. In 1979, he founded and presided over the State Executive Committee of FIREV – the Veracruz Student Independent Defensive Front. He left that position two years later to become the secretary general of the state National Revolutionary Youth Movement; from 1982 to 1989, he was the national secretary general of the Revolutionary Popular Youth organization. Simultaneously, between 1985 and 1988, Yunes Landa served as a federal deputy for the first time, in the LIII Legislature; he sat on committees dealing with the Navy, Fishing, Environment, Ecology, Border Matters, Justice, and Information, Administration and Complaints.

In 1988, Yunes Landa briefly served as an advisor to the Secretary of Fisheries, but he then went to study at the University of Warwick in England, even presiding over its Association of Foreign Students between 1990 and 1991; he would graduate from that institution with a graduate degree in public administration and political analysis. The next year, he attended the National University Law Center in Washington, D.C., picking up a master's degree in international and comparative law; while there, he presided over the graduate school's Association of Foreign Lawyers.

After three years as a liaison for the National Federation of Organizations and Citizens in the state of Sinaloa and a regional coordinator for the national PRI in the same state (1993–96), Yunes Landa went to work for INFONAVIT, where he was a regional delegation coordinator and an advisor to the director general between 1996 and 1997. The next year, Yunes went to another fund, FONATUR (National Fund to Stimulate Tourism), where he was the legal director between 1998 and 2001; he briefly transferred to the National Popular Housing Fund (FONHAPO), where he was a legal manager and headed the Institutional Linkage Unit). During this time, between 1997 and 2001, Yunes Landa was the secretary of the National Party Registry Commission within the PRI.

After a brief return to INFONAVIT in 2002 and 2003, Yunes Landa was tapped to become the deputy secretary of government of Veracruz, a position he held for most of the time between 2003 and 2007. The only exception was a brief period in 2004 when he was a private secretary to the governor.

In 2007, for the first time in nearly 20 years, Yunes Landa returned to a legislature, the LXI Legislature of Veracruz, as a local deputy. He headed the PRI's parliamentary group in the legislature and presided over the Political Coordination Board (JUCOPO).

Between 2011 and 2012, Yunes Landa served as the president of the PRI in the state of Veracruz.

In 2012, voters in Veracruz elected Yunes Landa to the Senate for the LXII and LXIII Legislatures of the Mexican Congress. He was the president of the Civil Protection Committee and sat on those dealing with Federalism, Communications and Transportation, and Energy.

=== 2016 gubernatorial campaign ===
In January 2016, Yunes Landa resigned from the Senate and was replaced by Erika Ayala Ríos, as he launched a bid for governor of Veracruz. His primary opposition was his first cousin, Miguel Ángel Yunes Linares, who had previously left the PRI and who ran under a PAN-PRD banner. During the election, Yunes Landa "lamented" his familial relationship with Yunes Linares, who he said had "insulted" his family. Five parties ultimately backed Yunes Landa's candidacy: the PRI, PVEM, Nueva Alianza, PT and Alternativa Veracruzana, a state party. Yunes Landa picked up 30.1 percent of the vote but lost to Yunes Linares, who became the first non-PRI governor of the state in 86 years.
