= Ramón Escobar Santiago =

Spanish politician (1937–2020)

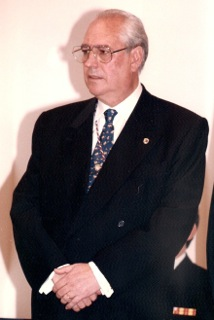
- Mayor Ramón Escobar Santiago in 1998

Mayor of Segovia
- In office 1991 – 4 July 1999
- Preceded by: ?
- Succeeded by: José Antonio López Arranz

Vice President of the Diputación Provincial de Segovia
- In office 1979–1981

Personal details
- Born: 14 March 1937 Valencia, Spain
- Died: 9 July 2020 (aged 83) Segovia, Spain
- Party: People's Party (PP)

Ramón Escobar Santiago (14 March 1937 – 8 July 2020) was a Spanish politician. He was a member of the People's Party. From 1979 to 1981, he was Vice President of the Diputación Provincial de Segovia. Escobar Santiago was Mayor of Segovia from 1991 until 1999. He was born in Valencia, Spain. One of his most important actions as mayor was the cut to traffic under the aqueduct, which allowed the rehabilitation of one of the best preserved Roman aqueducts in the world. He officially left politics in 2003 and he ended up becoming a board member and later a director for the Agrarian Training School of Segovia over the next four years, before retiring in 2007.

Escobar Santiago died on 8 July 2020 in Segovia, aged 83.
