= Luis Escobar (polo) =

American polo player (born 1971)

Luis Escobar (born 1971) is a seven-goal polo player. He also owns the Santa Clara Polo Club in Palm Beach, Florida.

== Biography ==
=== Early life ===
Luis Escobar was born in 1971 in Costa Rica. After graduating from high school in Costa Rica, he moved to Wellington, Florida with his parents in 1989. He graduated from Florida Atlantic University in Boca Raton, Florida, where he received a Bachelor of Science in marketing. In 1984, his father purchased the Santa Clara Polo Club in Palm Beach, Florida.

=== Polo career ===
Formally an eight-goal professional polo player. He plays for EFG International and the Lucchese Boot Company. He has won the Monty Waterbury Cup, among many other polo tournaments.

He also runs a polo school and a vacation program at the Santa Clara Polo Club, which he inherited from his father. He has taught Thomas Kato, former CEO of Kato Construction and current CEO of Merchant Hub, a credit card processing company.
