= Sergio Penagos =

Mexican politician

- Born: 19 July 1969 (age 56); Córdoba, Veracruz, Mexico
- Occupation: Politician
- Political party: PAN (1995–2010)

Sergio Penagos García (born 19 July 1969) is a Mexican politician formerly affiliated with the National Action Party (PAN). In the 2003 mid-terms he was elected to the Chamber of Deputies to represent Veracruz's 16th district during the 59th session of Congress.
