= Legislative Palace of San Lázaro =

- Palacio Legislativo de San Lázaro
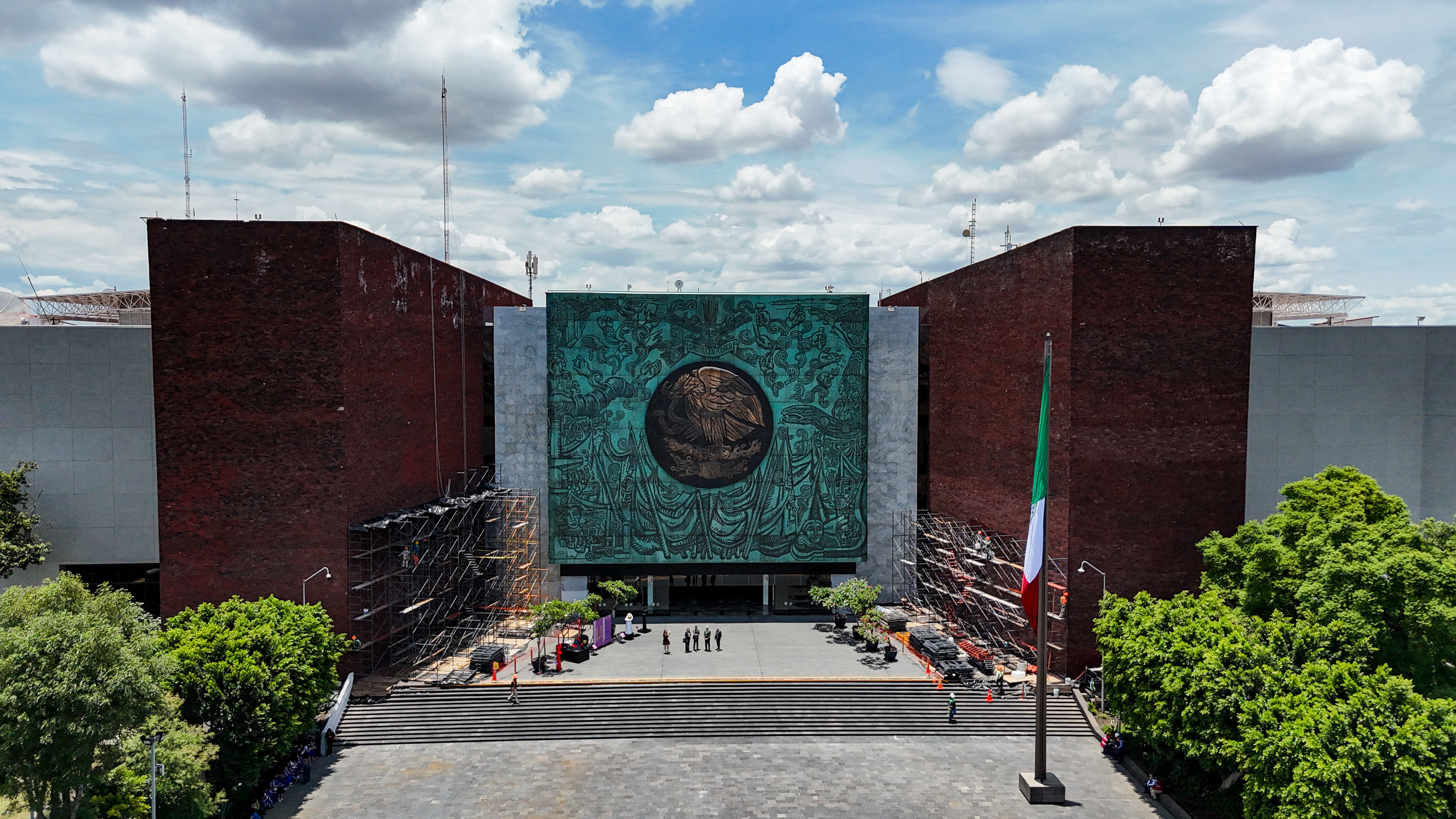
- Legislative Palace of San Lázaro

General information
- Architectural style: Minimalist, Modern architecture
- Location: Avenida Congreso de la Unión No. 66, Colonia El Parque, Delegación Venustiano Carranza C.P. 15960, Mexico City, Mexico
- Coordinates: 19°25′49″N 99°07′03″W
- Construction started: September 1979
- Completed: 1981; 45 years ago
- Client: President José López Portillo

Design and construction
- Architects: Pedro Ramírez Vázquez, Jorge Campuzano, David Suárez; Restoration Architect: Manuel de Santiago-de Borbón González Bravo.

The Legislative Palace of San Lázaro (Spanish: Palacio Legislativo de San Lázaro) is the main seat of the legislative power of the Mexican government, being the permanent meeting place of the Chamber of Deputies, as well as the seat of the whole Congress of the Union, when the Chamber of Deputies convenes in conjunction with the Senate of the Republic. Built in the late 20th century after a 1977 political reform, the complex is located in Mexico City about a mile east of the Zócalo central square, in the Venustiano Carranza borough, next to the Palace of Federal Justice. The complex draws its name from its location, as the San Lázaro Railway Station was the former occupant of the grounds where the palace was built.

== History ==
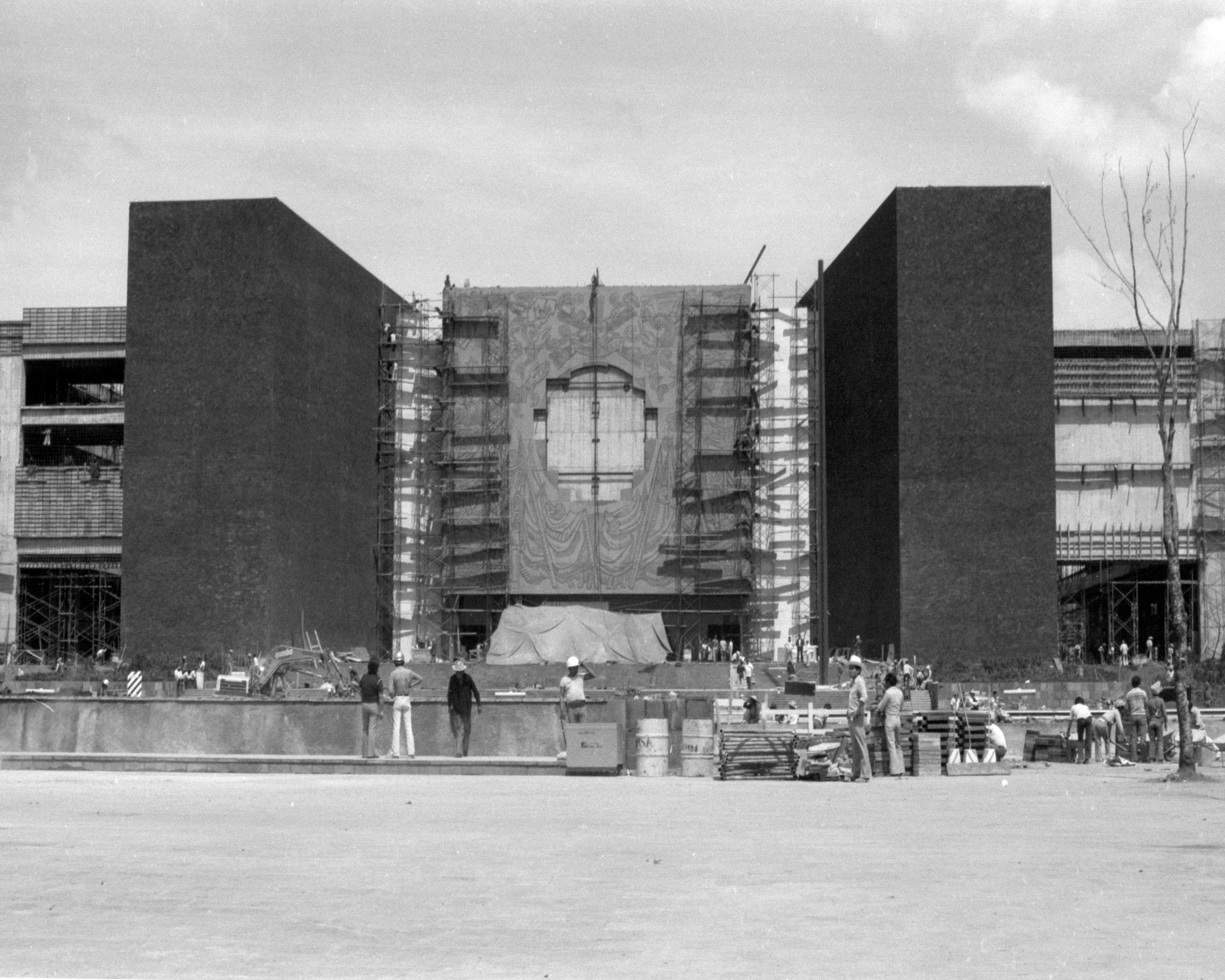
Works of the palace, 1981.

After the Mexican political reform of 1977, the number of deputies of the Chamber passed from 186 to 400, and thus, it was impossible for them to convene in the former meeting place, then known as the Legislative Palace of Donceles, which is now occupied by the Legislative Assembly of the Federal District. Thereupon, construction on a new seat of the Legislative began as a part of a plan of urban restructuring of the sector where the San Lázaro Station was located, on the limit of the Venustiano Carranza and Cuauhtémoc boroughs. Also on the property was built a new Palace of Federal Justice for the functions of the Judiciary branch of the government.

The project, which was promoted by former president José López Portillo, was a faction of a massive development and public works program of the government, resulting from a Mexican petroleum boom. Construction began in September 1979, following the plans of architects Pedro Ramírez Vázquez (who at the time served as Secretary of Settlement and Public Works), Jorge Campuzano, and David Suárez.

The grounds were formally inaugurated on 1 September 1981 as a part of the 5th Government Report (the equivalent of the State of the Union Address in Mexico) of López Portillo, and officially at the installation of the deputies and senators of the LI Legislature of the Congress of the Union.

The building was severely damaged after a fire in 1989, and President of Mexico Carlos Salinas de Gortari had it restored by Mexican architect Manuel de Santiago de la Torre, a renowned member of the International Council on Monuments and Sites.

On 10 October 2001, two Israeli terrorists, one of them a dual citizen of Mexico, were arrested after reportedly acting in a strange manner and failing to properly identify themselves when requested. They were later found to be carrying false Pakistani passports, firearms, as well as explosives, and identified as former members of the Israeli Special Forces. The men were then released after mediation from Israeli authorities.

On 13 September 2023, a public hearing presided over by prominent Mexican journalist and ufologist Jaime Maussan was held in the palace. During the hearing, what were alleged to be two extraterrestrial corpses from Peru were unveiled, with Maussan claiming support from Mexican authorities and the National Autonomous University of Mexico (UNAM). The event generated significant interest; however, the Mexican Congress did not conclusively affirm Maussan's claims. Furthermore, Julieta Fierro, physics researcher at UNAM, also stated that the university never endorsed Maussan's claims about the corpses and that his data "made no sense." UNAM further republished their September 2017 statement specifying that they did not make any conclusion as to the origins of a sample sent to them for Carbon 14 testing and that no other kind of testing was performed by them. Wired reported that "mummies" presented by Maussan are believed to be "an elaborate hoax made of human and animal bones".

== Architecture and restoration ==
The main facade of the building, which is located on Congreso de la Unión Avenue, is made up of three sections: the two ends are lined with red tezontle and the central one with white marble, forming a wide access plaza between them. Above the main door there is a sculptural set in bas-relief, on a green oxidized bronze plate made by artist José Chávez Morado, giving the total of the set the three colors of the Flag of Mexico.

The central motif of the sculptural ensemble is the national coat of arms, surrounded by a series of moving flags symbolizing the plurality of thoughts; faces emerge from the banners that represent the popular movements that Mexico will see. A huge feathered serpent is the symbol of traditional culture; Above it, virgules emerge that when ascending are joined with several hands, and each of these, accompanied by a different allegory, symbolizes the political, economic and social diversity of contemporary Mexico. The set is crowned by a large sun with the inscription Mexican Political Constitution. On each side, as background elements, there are representations of urban and rural cultures.

=== Session room ===
From the main door there is a direct entrance to a hall, where there are a series of murals made by muralist Adolfo Mexiac, where he narrates the history of three of the Constitutions that Mexico has had, those of 1824, 1857 and 1917.

From the lobby there is an entrance to the Session Room, where the Chamber or the General Congress meets, with a capacity for two thousand people, taking into account the galleries for special guests. In the session room, the 500 deputies and the 128 senators can meet together and is made up of a wide hemicycle that descends towards the center in a staggered manner.

The side walls of the room are lined with wood, while the front is lined with the same red tezontle as the façade. On this wall, at the opposite end of the entrance to the hall, is the main visual hallmark of the enclosure: the Wall of Honor.

=== Wall of Honor ===
The Wall of Honor is a set of surfaces on which the names of national heroes, institutions or individuals recognized for their merits to the country have been inscribed in gilt bronze letters, colloquially called "gold letters", with the aim of rendering them tribute and perpetuate their names in historical memory.

The wall is formed primarily by a quarry surface placed at the upper end of the front wall, next to the ceiling, and in huge gilded bronze letters is a famous phrase of President Benito Juárez:

Among individuals as among nations, the respect to other people's rights is peace

It is accompanied by the following names:

- Heroico Colegio Militar
- Constituyentes de 1917
- A los Defensores de Veracruz de 1914
- Heroica Escuela Naval Militar
- Antonia Nava
- Leona Vicario
- Josefa Ortiz de Domínguez
- Mariana R. del Toro de Lazarín
- Carmen Serdán

Under this phrase, there are five quarry walls, placed just behind the chamber of the Chamber, from where the Board of Directors presides over the sessions, of these walls the central one is wide and the other four are thin, two placed on each side of the center.

Two large national flags are placed on the central wall, one from left to right and the other from right to left, which are linked in the center with a tricolor bow, placed just below the quarry sculptural representation of the national coat of arms. At the top of this wall are the names of the last Aztec emperor, Cuauhtémoc, of the Tetzcocan Tlatoani Nezahualcoyotl and another famous phrase, this time by the insurgent Vicente Guerrero:

Spanish La patria es primero	Translation My homeland comes first.

It then features a large number of other names, the latest one having been added in 2018, being that of the Mexican Movement of 1968.

=== Tribune ===
Under the Wall of Honor is the tribune of the Chamber, a space divided into two levels, at the top of which is the seat from which the Deputy President of the Chamber presides over the sessions of the Chamber or the General Congress, accompanied by the vice presidents of the Board of Directors. In sessions of the General Congress, the President of the Senate of the Republic is also placed in this rostrum and in special sessions also the President of the Republic (outgoing and incoming in case of the ceremony of transmission of the Executive Power) and the President of the Supreme Court of Justice of the Nation; in addition to foreign heads of state invited on the occasion of a special session.

On the lower level are the Secretaries of the Board of Directors and there is also the platform from which the deputies speak in the sessions.

== See also ==
- Congress of the Union
- Federal government of Mexico
- 2001 Mexican Chamber of Deputies bombing attempt
