= LVII Legislature of the Mexican Congress =

Legislature of Mexico (1997–2000)

57th Congress (LVII Legislatura)
←	56th	58th	→
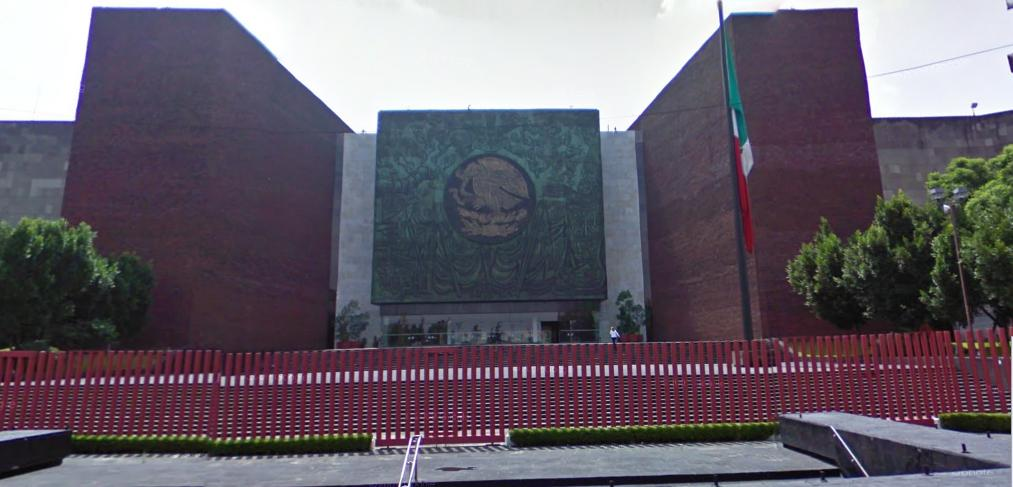
- Legislative Palace of San Lázaro

Overview
- Legislative body: Congress of the Union
- Meeting place: Legislative Palace of San Lázaro (Deputies/General Congress); Casona de Xicoténcatl (Senators)
- Term: 1 September 1997 – 31 August 2000
- Election: 6 July 1997

Senate of the Republic
- Members: 128

Chamber of Deputies
- Members: 500

The LVII Legislature (57th session) of the Congress of Mexico met from 1997 to 2000.

It was the first session in 68 years where the Institutional Revolutionary Party (PRI) did not hold an absolute majority over opposition parties in the Chamber of Deputies. The National Action Party (PAN), the Party of the Democratic Revolution (PRD), the Labor Party (PT), the Ecologist Green Party of Mexico (PVEM), and two independents combined for 261 of the 500 seats.

Preceded by LVI Legislature	LVII Legislature; 1997 to 2000	Succeeded by LVIII Legislature
