= Congress of Veracruz =

Legislature of the Mexican state of Veracruz

Congress of the State of Veracruz Congreso del Estado de Veracruz

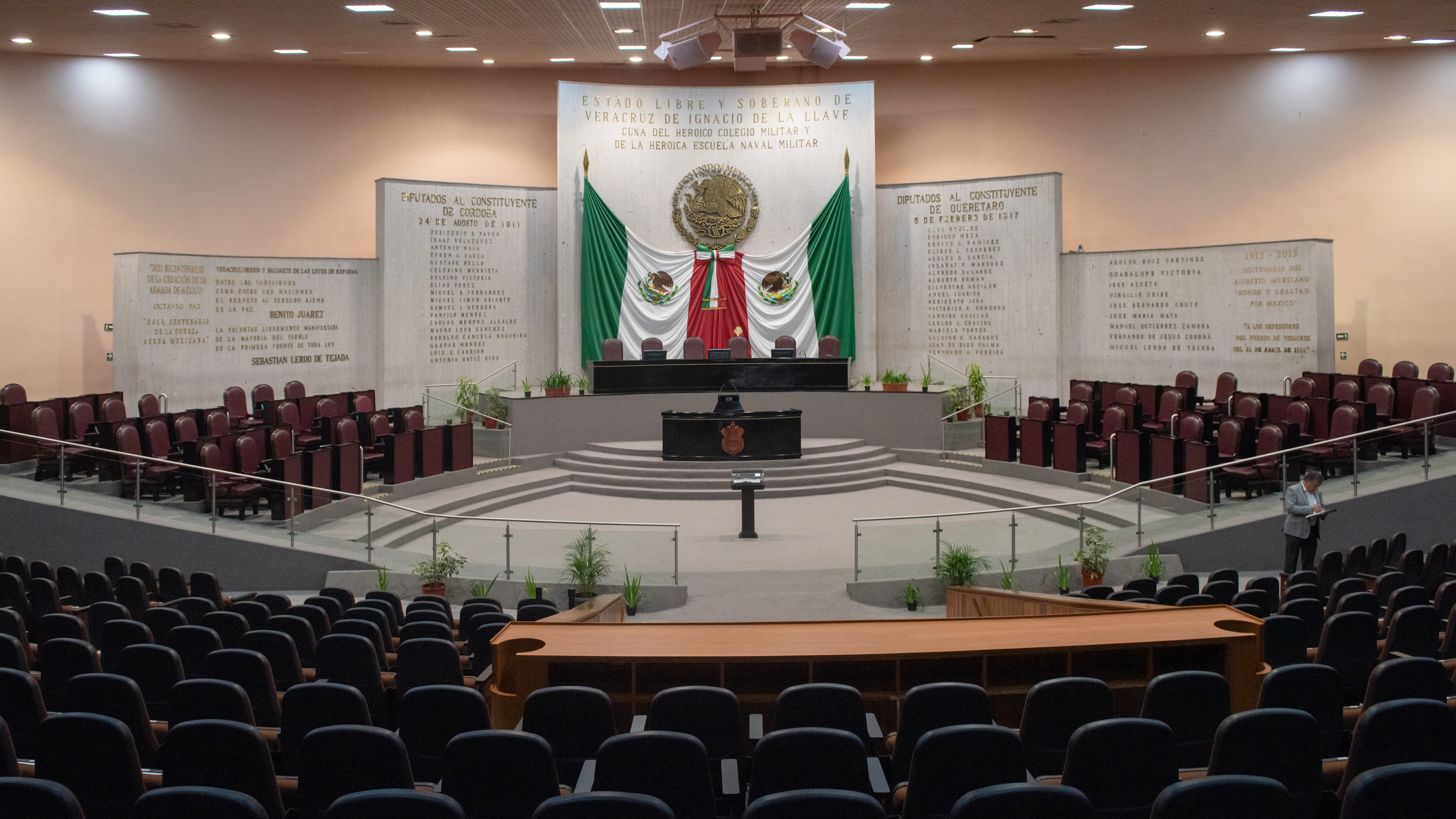
- Congress Chamber

Type
- Type: Unicameral

History
- Founded: 19 May 1824

Structure
- Seats: 50 deputies
- Length of term: 3 years
- Authority: Constitution of the State of Veracruz

Elections
- Voting system: 30 first-past-the-post seats and 20 proportional representation seats
- Last election: 2 June 2024
- Next election: 2027

Meeting place
- Xalapa, Veracruz, Mexico

Website
- legisver.gob.mx

The Congress of the State of Veracruz (Spanish: Congreso del Estado de Veracruz) is the legislative branch of government of the Mexican state of Veracruz. It meets in the state capital, Xalapa.

It comprises 50 deputies (diputados), who are elected for three-year terms. Thirty deputies are elected in single-member districts, with the remaining 20 elected by proportional representation in a single, state-wide constituency.

The most recent election was held on 2 June 2024.

== Composition 2024–2027 ==
Elected in June 2024, the 67th session of Congress ( LXVII legislatura) is to meet from 5 November 2024 to 4 November 2027. At the opening of the session, the composition of Congress was as shown below.

| Party | Deputies | | |
| Party | Districts | PR | Total |
|---|---|---|---|
| Movimiento Regeneración Nacional | 21 | 9 | 30 / 50 |
| Partido Verde Ecologista de México | 4 | 2 | 6 / 50 |
| Partido Acción Nacional | 1 | 4 | 5 / 50 |
| Partido del Trabajo | 4 | 1 | 5 / 50 |
| Partido Revolucionario Institucional | | 2 | 2 / 50 |
| Movimiento Ciudadano | | 2 | 2 / 50 |
| Total | 30 | 20 | 50 |
