= LXIV Legislature of the Mexican Congress =

Legislature of the Mexican Congress, 2018–2021

64th Congress LXIV Legislatura
←	63rd	65th	→
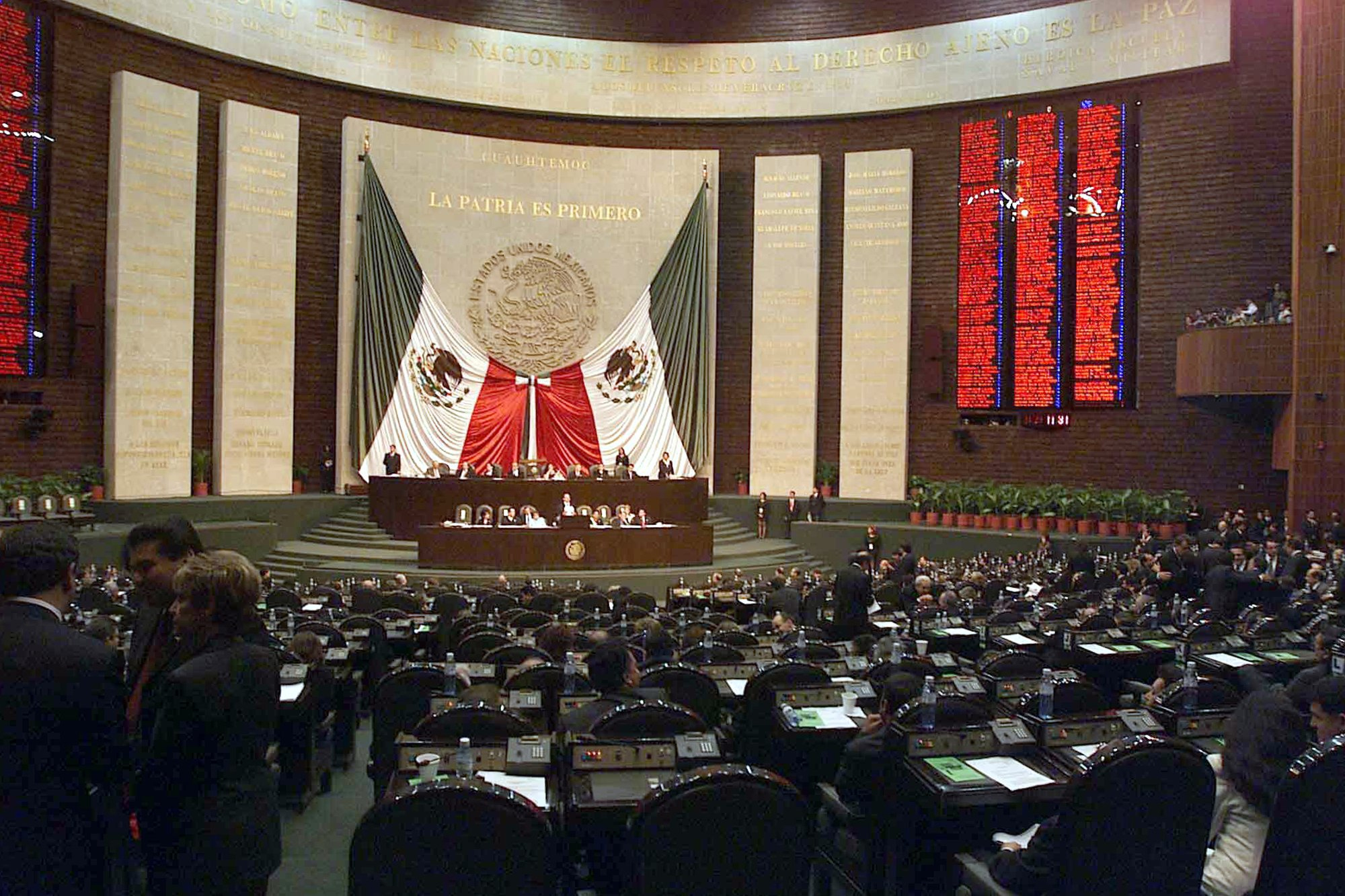
- Legislative Palace of San Lázaro

Overview
- Legislative body: Congress of the Union
- Meeting place: Legislative Palace of San Lázaro (Deputies/General Congress); Edificio del Senado (Senate)
- Term: 1 September 2018 – 31 August 2021
- Election: 1 July 2018

Senate of the Republic
- Members: 128
- President: Mónica Fernández Balboa

Chamber of Deputies
- Members: 500
- President: Dulce María Sauri Riancho

Sessions
- 1st: 1 September 2018 – 31 August 2021

The LXIV Legislature of the Congress of the Union, the 64th session of the Congress of Mexico, convened on 1 September 2018 and ended on 31 August 2021. It was composed of the 500 federal deputies and 128 senators elected in the 2018 Mexican general election. While the deputies served only in the 64th Congress, the senators, elected to six-year terms, also formed the Senate in the 65th Congress, which convened in 2021.

== Highlights ==
The 64th Congress was noteworthy for its gender parity, with the most women ever elected to the Chamber of Deputies and Senate. Women held 49 percent of the seats in the Senate, a national record and the third-highest percentage of women in a current national upper house, according to data collected by the Interparliamentary Union. The Chamber of Deputies had the fourth-highest percentage of women among lower houses. In the Chamber of Deputies, this was the first election to be conducted after a 2017 redistricting of the federal electoral districts conducted by the National Electoral Institute (INE). In reapportionment, Mexico City lost three seats, while seven states added a seat and four states lost one seat each. On 23 August the PRI, PRD, PAN and Movimiento Ciudadano announced they would challenge the allocation of proportional representation seats in the Chamber of Deputies, saying MORENA was overrepresented.

== Composition ==
=== Senate ===
Party	Senators Relative majority	Senators First minority	Senators PR	Total
National Action Party	7	10	6	23
Institutional Revolutionary Party	1	6	6	13
Party of the Democratic Revolution	1	5	2	8
Labor Party	5	0	1	6
Ecologist Green Party of Mexico	1	4	2	7
Movimiento Ciudadano	4	1	2	7
New Alliance Party	0	1	0	1
National Regeneration Movement	38	4	13	55
Social Encounter Party	7	1	0	8
Total	64	32	32	128
Source: INE (PR)

=== Chamber of Deputies ===
Party	Deputies Relative majority	Deputies PR	Total
National Action Party	41	41	82
Institutional Revolutionary Party	7	38	45
Party of the Democratic Revolution	9	12	21
Labor Party	57	3	60
Ecologist Green Party of Mexico	5	11	16
Movimiento Ciudadano	17	10	27
New Alliance Party	2	0	2
National Regeneration Movement	107	85	192
Social Encounter Party	55	0	55
Independent	0		
Total	300	200	500
Source: INE (PR)

== Leadership ==
=== Senate ===
President of the Senate

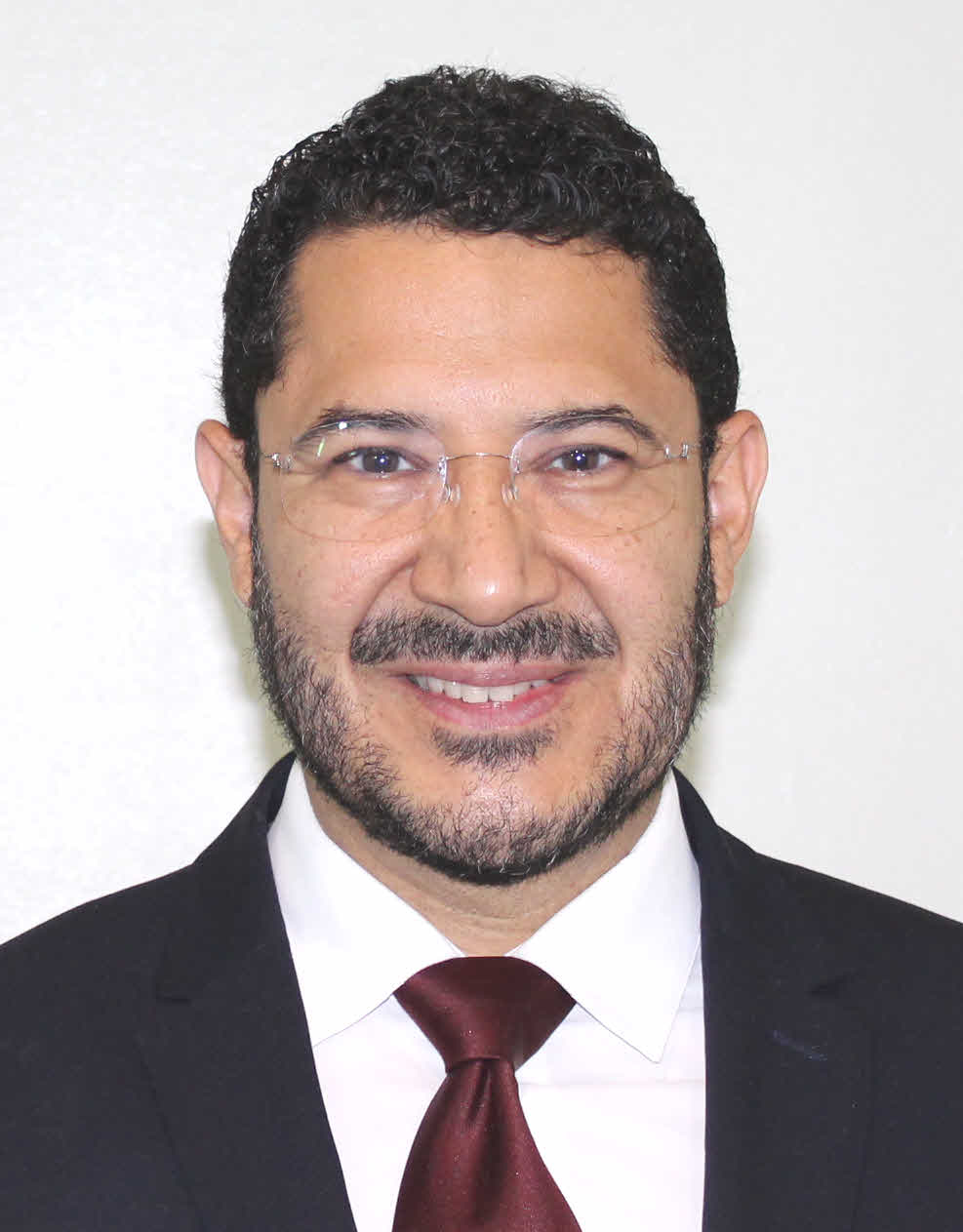
Marti Batres
(MRN), 2018–2019

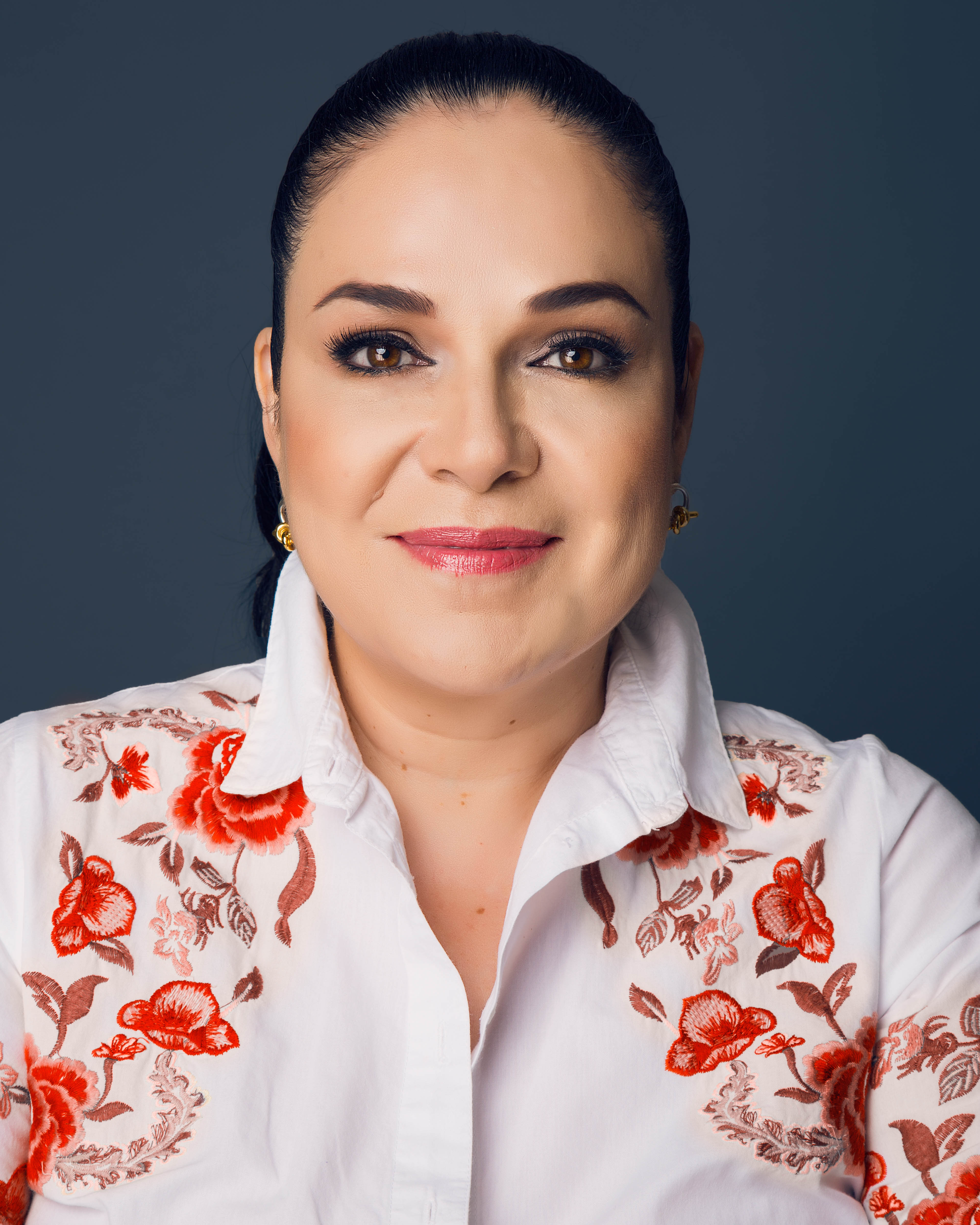
Mónica Fernández
(MRN), 2019–2020

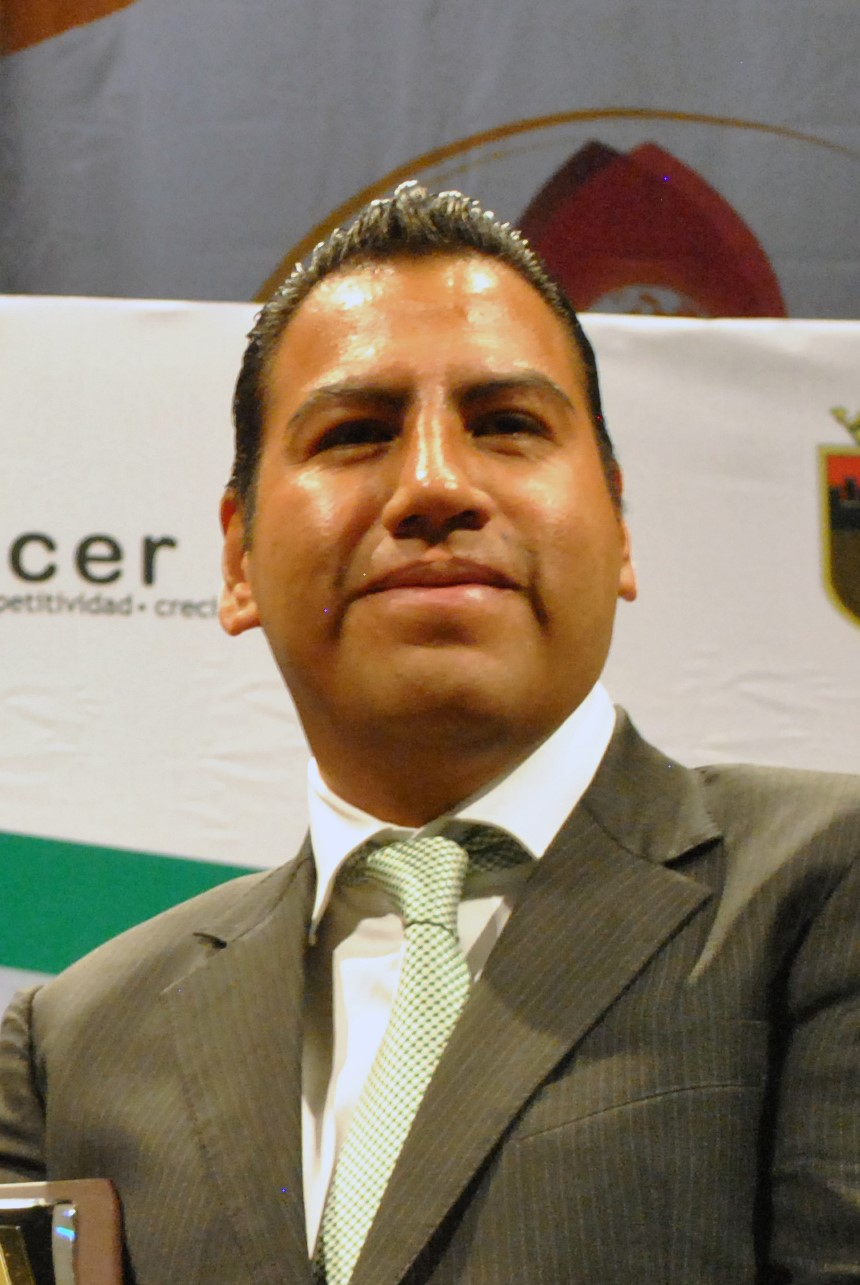
Eduardo Ramírez
(MRN), 2020–2021

==== Presiding ====
- Martí Batres Guadarrama (MRN), 2018–2019
- Mónica Fernández Balboa (MRN), 2019–2020
- Óscar Eduardo Ramírez Aguilar (MRN), 2020–2021

==== Party Leadership ====
- PAN Leader: Damián Zepeda Vidales, 2018
  - Rafael Moreno Valle Rosas, 2018
    - Mauricio Kuri González, from 2018
- PRI Leader: Miguel Ángel Osorio Chong
- PRD Leader: Miguel Ángel Mancera
- PT Leader: Alejandro González Yáñez, until 2019
  - Geovanna Bañuelos de la Torre, from 2019
- PVEM Leader: Manuel Velasco Coello, 2018
  - Raúl Bolaños Cacho Cué, from 2018
- MC Leader: Dante Delgado Rannauro
- MRN Leader: Ricardo Monreal Ávila
- PES Leader: Sasil de León Villard

=== Chamber of Deputies ===
President of the Chamber of Deputies

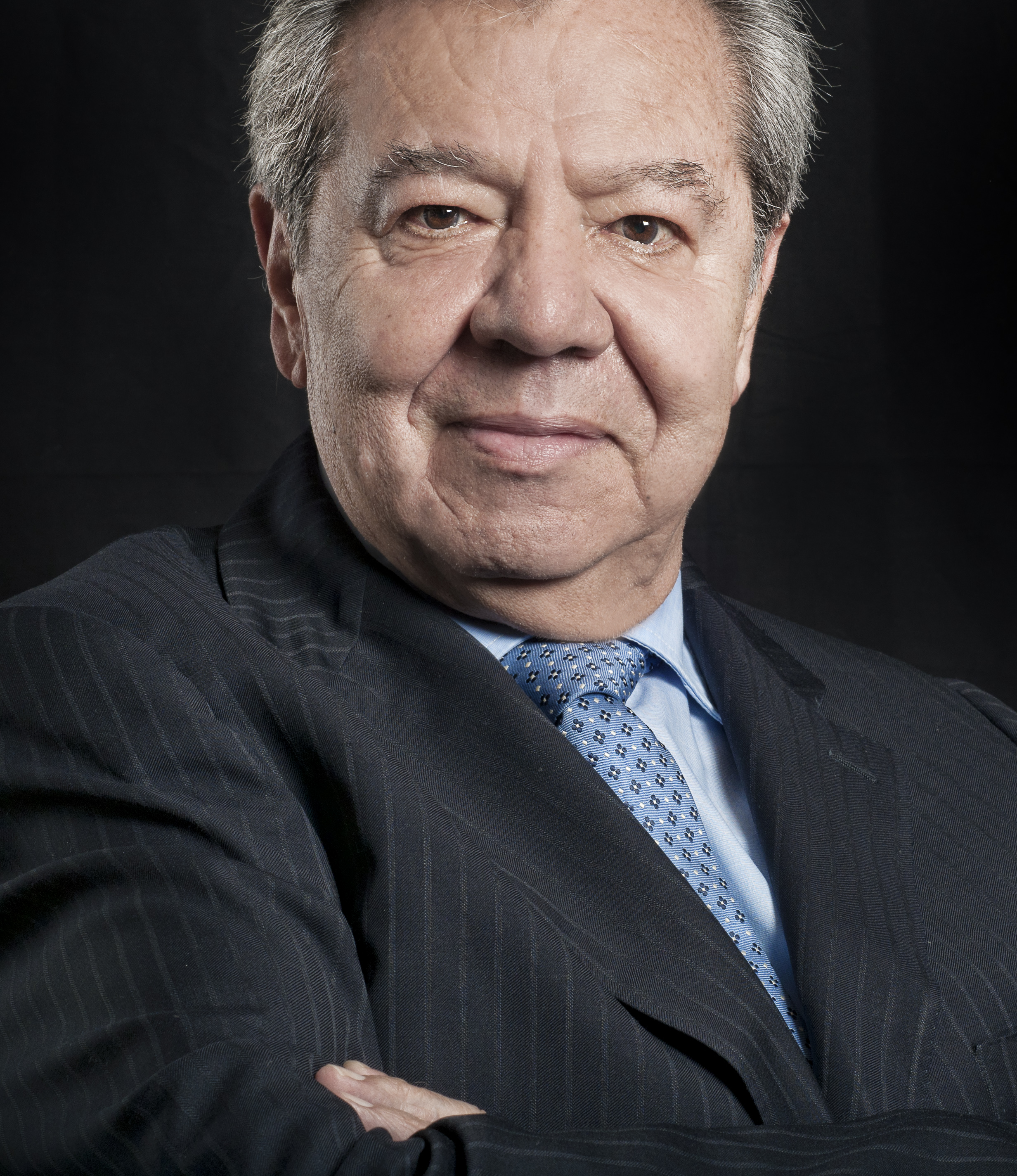
Porfirio Muñoz Ledo (MRN), 2018–2019

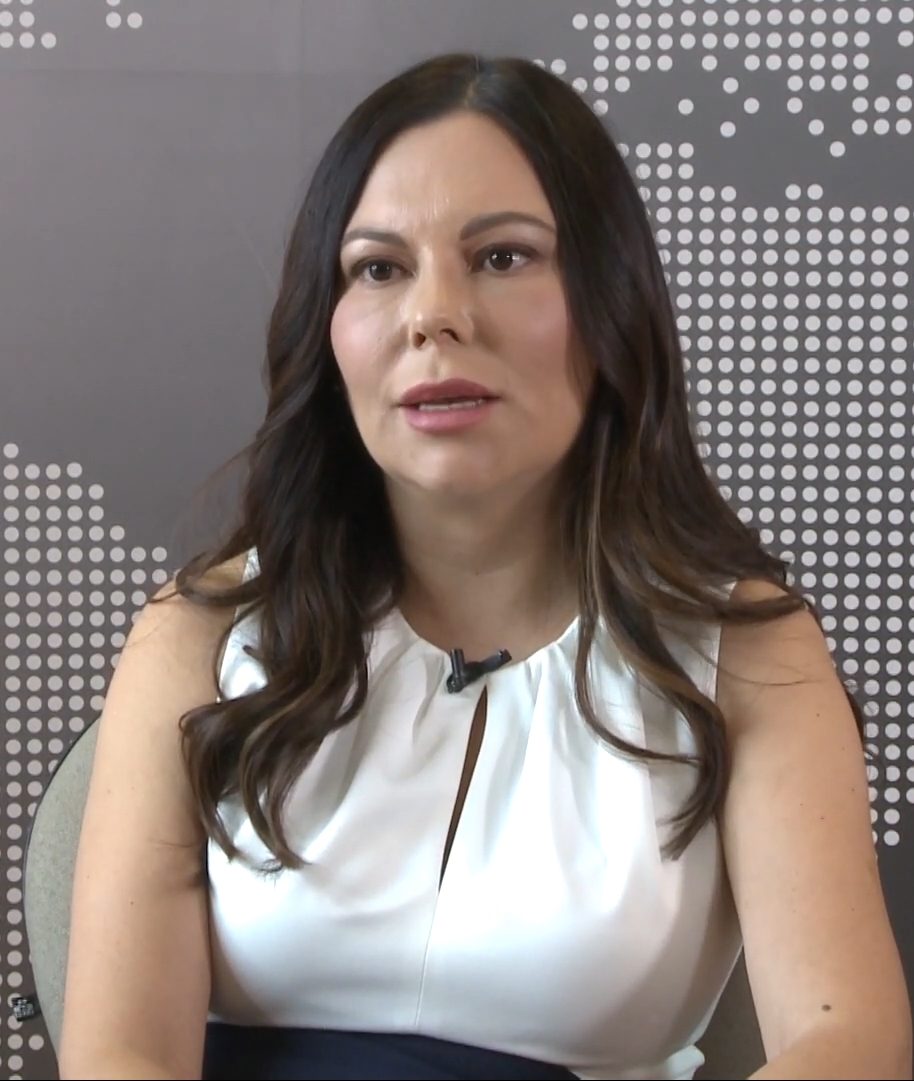
Laura Rojas Hernández (PAN), 2019–2020

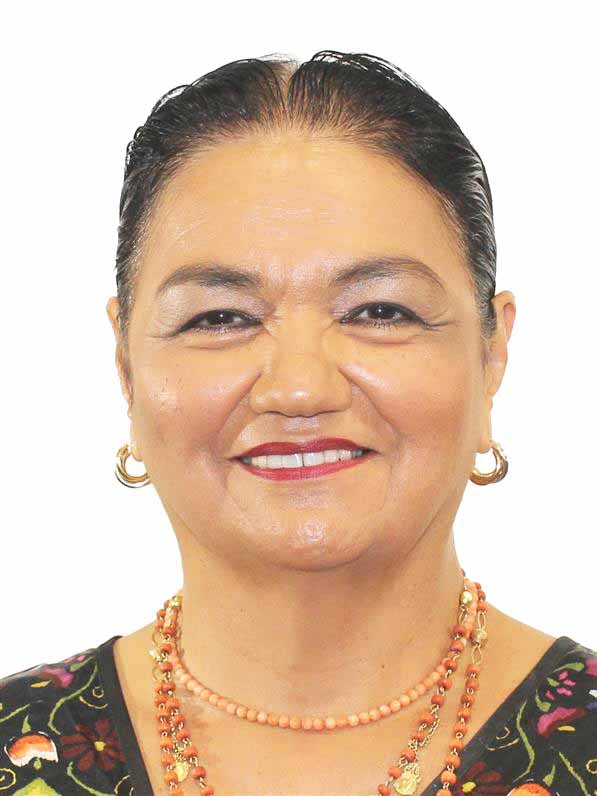
Dulce María Sauri (PRI), 2020–2021

==== Presiding ====
- Porfirio Muñoz Ledo (MRN), 2018–2019
- Laura Rojas Hernández (PAN), 2019–2020
- Dulce María Sauri Riancho (PRI), 2020–2021

==== Party leadership ====
- PAN Leader: Juan Carlos Romero Hicks
- PRI Leader: René Juárez Cisneros
- PRD Leader: Ricardo Gallardo Cardona, until 2019
  - Verónica Juárez Piña, from 2019
- PT Leader: Reginaldo Sandoval Flores
- PVEM Leader: Arturo Escobar y Vega
- MC Leader: Alberto Esquer Gutiérrez, 2018
  - Itzcóatl Tonatiuh Bravo Padilla, 2018–2021
    - Fabiola Loya Hernández, from 2021
- MRN Leader: Mario Martin Delgado, until 2020
  - Ignacio Mier Velazco, from 2020
- PES Leader: Fernando Manzanilla Prieto, until 2019
  - Olga Juliana Elizondo Guerra, 2019
    - Jorge Argüelles Victorero, from 2019

== Membership ==
=== Senate ===
The Senate is composed of 128 seats; three each elected from each of Mexico's 32 federative entities for a total of 96, as well as 32 proportional representation seats.

==== Elected by state ====
In the list, the first two senators represent those who won a majority in the state, with the first referring to the first formula and the second to the second formula. The third corresponds to the senator who secured a seat through first minority.

==== Aguascalientes ====
- ▌Martha Márquez Alvarado (PAN)
- ▌Juan Antonio Martín del Campo (PAN)
- ▌Daniel Gutiérrez Castorena (MORENA)

==== Baja California ====
- ▌Jaime Bonilla Valdez (MORENA) (until 6 December 2018)
  - ▌ Gerardo Novelo Osuna (MORENA) (since 6 December 2018)
- ▌▌Alejandra León Gastélum (MORENA, then I) (Note: In Baja California: Alejandra León Gastélum left Morena to become an independent politician on 12 April 2021.)
- ▌Gina Cruz Blackledge (PAN)

==== Baja California Sur ====
- ▌Víctor Manuel Castro Cosío (MORENA) (until 2 December 2018) (Note: In Baja California Sur: Víctor Manuel Castro Cosío took a leave on absence on 2 December 2018 to serve as a state-level coordinator in Lopez Obrador's government. His alternate, Ricardo Velázquez Meza, took his place.)
  - ▌ Ricardo Velázquez Meza (MORENA) (since 6 December 2018)
- ▌Lucía Trasviña Waldenrath (MORENA)
- ▌María Guadalupe Saldaña Cisneros (PAN) (until 10 February 2021; since 10 June 2021)
  - ▌María Guadalupe Saldaña Cisneros (PAN) (from 10 February to 10 June 2021)

==== Campeche ====
- ▌Aníbal Ostoa Ortega (MORENA) (until 15 September 2021)
  - ▌ Arturo Moo Cahuich (PES) (since 15 September 2021)
- ▌Cecilia Margarita Sánchez García (MORENA)
- ▌Rocío Abreu Artiñano (MORENA)

==== Chiapas ====
- ▌Eduardo Ramírez Aguilar (MORENA)
- ▌Sasil de León Villard (PES)
- ▌▌Noé Castañón Ramírez (PRI, then MC) (Note: In Chiapas: Noé Castañón Ramírez left the Institutional Revolutionary Party on 30 January 2019 and joined Citizens' Movement the next day.)

==== Chihuahua ====
- ▌Bertha Caraveo Camarena (MORENA)
- ▌Cruz Pérez Cuéllar (MORENA) (until 10 September 2021)
  - ▌ Rafael Espino de la Peña (MORENA) (since 10 September 2021)
- ▌Gustavo Madero Muñoz (PAN)

==== Coahuila ====
- ▌Armando Guadiana Tijerina (MORENA) (until 1 January 2021; since 6 June 2021)
  - ▌ Reyes Flores Hurtado (MORENA) (from 1 January to 6 June 2021)
- ▌Eva Galaz Caletti (MORENA)
- ▌Verónica Martínez García (PRI)

==== Colima ====
- ▌Joel Padilla Peña (PT)
- ▌Gricelda Valencia de la Mora (MORENA)
- ▌Gabriela Benavides Cobos (PVEM)

==== Mexico City ====
- ▌Martí Batres (MORENA) (until 15 July 2021) (Note: In Mexico City: Martí Batres took a leave of absence on 15 July 2021 to serve in the cabinet of the Mexico City government. His alternate, César Cravioto Romero, took his place.)
  - ▌César Cravioto Romero (MORENA) (since 16 July 2021)
- ▌Citlalli Hernández Mora (MORENA) (until 14 September 2020)
  - ▌María Celeste Sánchez Sugía (MORENA) (since 14 October 2020)
- ▌Emilio Álvarez Icaza (I)

==== Durango ====
- ▌Alejandro González Yáñez (PT) (from 5 March 2019)
  - ▌ Miguel Ángel Lucero Olivas (PT) (since 5 March 2019)
- ▌Margarita Valdéz Martínez (MORENA)
- ▌▌José Ramón Enríquez Herrera (MC, then MORENA) (Note: In Durango: José Ramón Enríquez Herrera switched from Citizens' Movement to MORENA on 10 June 2020.)

==== Guanajuato ====
- ▌Alejandra Reynoso Sánchez (PAN)
- ▌Erandi Bermúdez Méndez (PAN)
- ▌Martha Lucía Mícher Camarena (MORENA)

==== Guerrero ====
- ▌Félix Salgado Macedonio (MORENA) (until 31 August 2020; since 7 June 2021)
  - ▌Saúl López Sollano (MORENA) (from 22 September 2020 to 6 June 2021)
- ▌Nestora Salgado (MORENA)
- ▌Manuel Añorve Baños (PRI)

==== Hidalgo ====
- ▌Angélica García Arrieta (MORENA) (until 22 December 2018) (Note: In Hidalgo: Angélica García Arrieta died on 22 December 2018. Her alternate, Angélica García Arrieta, took her place on 2 January 2019.)
  - ▌ María Merced González González (MORENA) (since 2 January 2019)
- ▌Julio Menchaca Salazar (MORENA)
- ▌Nuvia Mayorga Delgado (PRI)

==== Jalisco ====
- ▌Clemente Castañeda Hoeflich (MC)
- ▌Verónica Delgadillo García (MC) (until 11 March 2021; since 9 June 2021)
  - ▌ Ruth Alejandra López Hernández (MC) (from 11 March to 9 June 2021)
- ▌María Antonia Cárdenas Mariscal (MORENA)

==== State of Mexico ====
- ▌Delfina Gómez Álvarez (MORENA) (until 2 December 2018)
  - ▌ Martha Guerrero Sánchez (MORENA) (since 4 December 2018)
- ▌Higinio Martínez Miranda (MORENA) until 18 September 2019; since 29 January 2020
  - ▌ Ricardo Morena Bastida (MORENA) from 19 September 2019 to 29 January 2020
- ▌▌Juan Zepeda Hernández (PRD, then MC) (Note: In State of Mexico: Juan Zepeda Hernández left the Party of the Democratic Revolution on 27 August 2019 and joined Citizens' Movement on 2 September 2019.)

==== Michoacán ====
- ▌Blanca Estela Piña Gudiño (MORENA)
- ▌Cristóbal Arias Solís (MORENA) (until 21 January 2021; since 5 July 2021)
  - ▌ José Alfonso Solórzano Fraga (MORENA) (from 2 February to 5 July 2021)
- ▌Antonio García Conejo (PRD) (until 4 March 2021; since 2 June 2021)
  - ▌ Marco Trejo Pureco (PRD) (from 8 March to 2 June 2021)

==== Morelos ====
- ▌Lucía Meza Guzmán (PRI)
- ▌Radamés Salazar Solorio (MORENA) (until 21 February 2021) (Note: In Morelos: Radamés Salazar Solorio died on 21 February 2021. His alternate, Sergio Pérez Flores, took his place on the same day.)
  - ▌Sergio Pérez Flores (MORENA) (since 21 February 2021)
- ▌Ángel García Yáñez (PRI)

==== Nayarit ====
- ▌Cora Cecilia Pinedo Alonso (PT)
- ▌Rosa Elena Jiménez Arteaga (MORENA)
- ▌Gloria Elizabeth Núñez Sánchez (PAN) (until 26 February 2021; since 9 June 2021)
  - ▌ Martha María Rodríguez Domínguez (PAN) (from 26 February to 9 June 2021)

==== Nuevo León ====
- ▌Samuel García (MC) (until 18 November 2020) (Note: In Nuevo León: Samuel García took a leave of absence on 18 November 2020 to run for and later serve as governor of Nuevo León. His alternate, Luis David Ortiz Salinas, took his place.)
  - ▌ Luis David Ortiz Salinas (MC) (since 19 November 2020)
- ▌Indira Kempis Martínez (MC)
- ▌Víctor Oswaldo Fuentes Solís (PAN) (until 28 January 2021; since 14 May 2021)
  - ▌ Jesús Horacio González Delgadillo (PAN) (from 1 February to 14 May 2021)

==== Oaxaca ====
- ▌Susana Harp (MORENA) (until 19 May 2020; since 12 August 2020)
  - ▌Concepción Rueda Gómez (MORENA) (from 29 June to 12 August 2020)
- ▌Salomón Jara Cruz (MORENA)
- ▌Raúl Bolaños Cacho Cué (PVEM)

==== Puebla ====
- ▌Alejandro Armenta Mier (MORENA)
- ▌Nancy de la Sierra Arámburo (PT)
- ▌Nadia Navarro Acevedo (PAN)

==== Querétaro ====
- ▌Mauricio Kuri González (PAN) (until 1 February 2021) (Note: In Querétaro: Mauricio Kuri González took a leave of absence on 1 February 2021 to run for and later serve as governor of Querétaro. His alternate, José Alfredo Botello Montes, took his place.)
  - ▌José Alfredo Botello Montes (PAN) (since 1 February 2021)
- ▌Guadalupe Murguía Gutiérrez (PAN)
- ▌Gilberto Herrera Ruiz (MORENA)

==== Quintana Roo ====
- ▌Marybel Villegas Canché (MORENA)
- ▌José Luis Pech Várguez (MORENA)
- ▌Mayuli Martínez Simón (PAN) (until 8 April 2021; since 7 June 2021)
  - ▌Laura Susana Martinez Cárdenas (PAN) (from 13 April to 7 June 2021)

==== San Luis Potosí ====
- ▌▌Leonor Noyola Cervantes (PRD, then PVEM) (until 4 March 2021) (Note: In San Luis Potosí: Leonor Noyola Cervantes took a leave of absence on 4 March 2021 to run for and later serve as mayor of Soledad de Graciano Sánchez. Her alternate, Graciela Gaitán Díaz, took her place.)
  - ▌▌Graciela Gaitán Díaz (PRD, then PVEM) (since 4 March 2021)
- ▌Marco Antonio Gama Basarte (PAN) (until 15 October 2020; since 27 August 2021)
  - ▌Laura Susana Martinez Cárdenas (PAN) (from 15 October 2020 to 27 August 2021)
- ▌Primo Dothé Mata (MORENA)

==== Sinaloa ====
- ▌Rubén Rocha Moya (MORENA) (until 5 March 2020) (Note: In Sinaloa: Rubén Rocha Moya took a leave of absence on 5 March 2020 to run for and later serve as governor of Sinaloa. His alternate, Raúl Elenes Angulo, took his place.)
  - ▌Raúl Elenes Angulo (MORENA) (since 9 March 2020)
- ▌Imelda Castro Castro (MORENA)
- ▌Mario Zamora Gastelum (PRI)(until 2 March 2021; since 15 June 2021)
  - ▌Heriberto Galindo Quiñones (PRI) (from 9 March to 15 June 2021)

==== Sonora ====
- ▌▌Lilly Téllez (MORENA, then PAN)
- ▌Alfonso Durazo Montaño (MORENA) (until 29 November 2018) (Note: In Sonora: Alfonso Durazo Montaño took a leave of absence on 29 November 2018 to become the Secretary of Security and Civilian Protection. His alternate, Arturo Bours Griffith, took his place.)
  - ▌Arturo Bours Griffith (MORENA) (since 4 December 2018)
- ▌Sylvana Beltrones Sánchez (PRI)

==== Tabasco ====
- ▌Mónica Fernández Balboa (MORENA)
- ▌Javier May Rodríguez (MORENA) (until 8 November 2018) (Note: In Tabasco: Javier May Rodríguez took a leave of absence on 8 November 2018 to become the Secretary of Welfare. His alternate, Ovidio Peralta Suárez, took his place.)
  - ▌ Ovidio Peralta Suárez (MORENA) (since 4 December 2018)
- ▌Juan Manuel Fócil Pérez (PRD)

==== Tamaulipas ====
- ▌Américo Villarreal Anaya (MORENA)
- ▌María Guadalupe Covarrubias Cervantes (MORENA)
- ▌Ismael García Cabeza de Vaca (PAN)

==== Tlaxcala ====
- ▌Ana Lilia Rivera Rivera (MORENA)
- ▌José Antonio Álvarez Lima (MORENA) (until 28 February 2019; since 20 November 2020)
  - ▌ Joel Molina Ramírez (MORENA) (from 28 February 2019 to 24 October 2020)
- ▌Minerva Hernández Ramos (PAN)

==== Veracruz ====
- ▌Rocío Nahle García (MORENA) (until 27 November 2018) (Note: In Veracruz: Rocío Nahle García took a leave of absence on 27 November 2018 to become the Secretary of Energy. Her alternate, Gloria Sánchez Hernández, took her place.)
  - ▌ Gloria Sánchez Hernández (MORENA) (since 29 November 2018)
- ▌Ricardo Ahued Bardahuil (MORENA) (from 1 September 2018 to 28 May 2019 and from 30 April 2020 to 23 March 2021) (Note: In Veracruz: Ricardo Ahued Bardahuil took a leave of absence on 28 May 2019 to become the Customs Director of Veracruz. He returned to the Senate on 30 April 2020 and requested another leave on 23 March 2021 to run for and later serve as mayor of Xalapa. His alternate, Ernesto Pérez Astorga, took his place on both occasions.)
  - ▌Ernesto Pérez Astorga (MORENA) (from 28 May 2019 to 30 April 2020 and since 1 April 2021)
- ▌Julen Rementería del Puerto (PAN)

==== Yucatán ====
- ▌Jorge Carlos Ramírez Marín (PRI) (until 8 April 2021; since 14 June 2021)
- ▌▌Verónica Camino Farjat (PVEM, then MORENA) (until 8 April 2021; since 30 June 2021)
  - ▌María Marena López García (MORENA) (from 13 April 2021 to 30 June 2021)
- ▌Raúl Paz Alonzo (PAN)

==== Zacatecas ====
- ▌Soledad Luévano Cantú (MORENA)
- ▌José Narro Céspedes (MORENA)
- ▌Claudia Anaya Mota (PRI) (until 4 March 2021; since 9 June 2021)
  - ▌▌Evelia Sandoval Urbán (PANAL, then MORENA) (from 4 March to 8 June 2021)

==== Elected by proportional representation ====
- ▌Josefina Vázquez Mota (PAN)
- ▌Xóchitl Gálvez Ruiz (PAN)
- ▌Indira Rosales San Román (PAN)
- ▌Damián Zepeda Vidales (PAN)
- ▌Kenia López Rabadán (PAN)
- ▌Rafael Moreno Valle Rosas (PAN) (until 24 December 2018) (Note: Rafael Moreno Valle Rosas died on 24 December 2018 in the 2018 Puebla helicopter crash. His alternate, Roberto Moya Clemente, took his place on 2 January 2019.)
  - ▌Roberto Moya Clemente (PAN) (from 2 January 2019)
- ▌Claudia Ruiz Massieu Salinas (PRI)
- ▌Carlos Humberto Aceves (PRI)
- ▌Vanessa Rubio Márquez (PRI) (until 16 July 2020)
  - ▌Nancy Guadalupe Sánchez Arredondo (MORENA) (since 16 July 2020)
- ▌Miguel Ángel Osorio Chong (PRI)
- ▌Beatriz Paredes Rangel (PRI)
- ▌Eruviel Ávila Villegas (PRI)
- ▌Miguel Ángel Mancera (PRD)
- ▌▌Israel Zamora Guzmán (PRD, then PVEM)
- ▌Geovanna Bañuelos de la Torre (PT)
- ▌Alejandra Lagunes (PVEM)
- ▌Manuel Velasco Coello (PVEM)
- ▌Patricia Mercado (MC)
- ▌Dante Delgado Rannauro (MC)
- ▌Elvia Marcela Mora Arellano (PES)
- ▌Katya Elizabeth Ávila Vázquez (PES)
- ▌Eunice Renata Romo Molina (PES)
- ▌Antares Vázquez Alatorre (MORENA)
- ▌Héctor Vasconcelos (MORENA)
- ▌Olga Sánchez Cordero (MORENA) (until 29 November 2018; since 26 August 2021)
  - ▌Jesusa Rodríguez (MORENA) (from 29 November 2018 until 26 August 2021)
- ▌Ricardo Monreal Ávila (MORENA)
- ▌Ifigenia Martínez (MORENA)
- ▌Napoleón Gómez Urrutia (MORENA)
- ▌Germán Martínez Cázares (MORENA)
- ▌Casimiro Méndez Ortiz (MORENA)
- ▌Gabriel García Hernández (MORENA) (until 29 November 2018; since 1 July 2021)
  - ▌José Alejandro Peña Villa (MORENA) (from 29 November 2018 until 1 July 2021)
- ▌Claudia Balderas Espinoza (MORENA)

=== Chamber of Deputies ===
The Chamber of Deputies is composed of 500 seats, elected from 300 single-member federal electoral districts and 40 apiece from five proportional representation electoral regions.

==== Aguascalientes ====
- 1st: Francisco Javier Luevano Nuñez (PAN)
- 2nd: Elba Lorena Torres Díaz (PT)
- 3rd: Martha Elisa González Estrada (PAN)

==== Baja California ====
- 1st: Jesús Salvador Minor Mora (MRN)
- 2nd: Marina del Pilar Ávila Olmeda (MRN)
- 3rd: Armando Reyes Ledesma (PT)
- 4th: Socorro Andaloza Gómez (MRN)
- 5th: Mario Ismael Moreno Gil (MRN)
- 6th: Javier Castañeda Pomposo (MRN)
- 7th: Érik Morales (MRN)
- 8th: Héctor Cruz Aparicio (PES)

==== Baja California Sur ====
- 1st: Ana Ruth García Grande (MRN)
- 2nd: Alfredo Porras Domínguez (PT)

==== Campeche ====
- 1st: Carlos Martínez Ake (MRN)
- 2nd: Irasema Buenfil Díaz (MRN)

==== Chiapas ====
- 1st: Manuela Obrador Narváez (MRN)
- 2nd: Humberto Pedrero Moreno (MRN)
- 3rd: Alfredo Vázquez Vázquez (MRN)
- 4th: Roque Luis Rabelo Velasco (MRN)
- 5th: Clementina Dekker Gómez (PT)
- 6th: Zoé Robledo Aburto (MRN) (until 8 November 2018)
  - Raúl Bonifaz Moedano (MRN) (from 8 November 2018)
- 7th: Miguel Prado de los Santos (MRN)
- 8th: María Roselia Jiménez Pérez (PT)
- 9th: Leticia Aguilar Molina (MRN)
- 10th: Juan Farrera Esponda (MRN)
- 11th: Roberto Rubio Montejo (PVEM)
- 12th: José Luis Elorza Flores (MRN)
- 13th: Maricruz Roblero Gordillo (PT)

==== Chihuahua ====
- 1st: Esther Mejía Cruz (MRN)
- 2nd: Maité Vargas Meraz (MRN)
- 3rd: Claudia Elena Lastra Muñoz (PT)
- 4th: Ulises García Soto (MRN)
- 5th: Mario Mata Carrasco (PAN)
- 6th: Miguel Riggs Baeza (PAN)
- 7th: Eraclio Rodríguez Gómez (PT)
- 8th: Alan Falomir Sáenz (MC)
- 9th: Ángeles Gutiérrez Valdez (PAN)

==== Ciudad de México ====
- 1st: Erika Vanessa del Castillo Ibarra (PES)
- 2nd: Armando González Escoto (MRN)
- 3rd: Miguel Ángel Jáuregui (MRN)
- 4th: Gerardo Fernández Noroña (PT)
- 5th: Claudia López Rayón (MRN)
- 6th: Sergio Mayer (MRN)
- 7th: Beatriz Rojas Martínez (PES)
- 8th: María Rosete Sánchez (PT)
- 9th: Adriana Espinosa de los Monteros (PT)
- 10th: Javier Hidalgo Ponce (MRN)
- 11th: Rocío Barrera Badillo (MRN)
- 12th: Dolores Padierna Luna (MRN)
- 13th: Mario Martín Delgado (MRN) (until 5 November 2020)
  - Oscar Gutiérrez Camacho (MRN) (from 5 November 2020)
- 14th: Alfonso Ramírez Cuéllar (MRN)
- 15th: Luis Alberto Mendoza Acevedo (PAN)
- 16th: Lorena Villavicencio Ayala (MRN)
- 17th: Francisco Javier Saldívar Camacho (PT)
- 18th: Ana María Rodríguez Ruiz (MRN)
- 19th: Aleida Alavez Ruiz (MRN)
- 20th: Ana Karina Rojo Pimentel (MRN)
- 21st: Flor Ivone Morales Miranda (PT)
- 22nd: Víctor Varela López (PES)
- 23rd: Pablo Gómez Álvarez (MRN)
- 24th: Guadalupe Ramos Sotelo (MRN)

==== Coahuila ====
- 1st: Lenin Pérez Rivera (PAN)
- 2nd: Francisco Javier Borrego Adame (MRN)
- 3rd: Melba Farías Zambrano (MRN)
- 4th: Martha Garay Cadena (PRI)
- 5th: Luis Fernando Salazar Fernández (MRN)
- 6th: José Ángel Pérez Hernández (PES)
- 7th: Fernando de las Fuentes Hernández (PRI)

==== Colima ====
- 1st: Claudia Yáñez Centeno (MRN)
- 2nd: Indira Vizcaíno Silva (PT)

==== Durango ====
- 1st: Martha Olivia García Vidaña (MRN)
- 2nd: Alma Marina Vitela (PES)
- 3rd: Maribel Aguilera Cháirez (MRN)
- 4th: Hilda Patricia Ortega Nájera (MRN)

==== Guanajuato ====
- 1st: Ariel Rodríguez Vázquez (MC)
- 2nd: Ricardo Villarreal García (PAN)
- 3rd: Ángeles Ayala Díaz (PAN)
- 4th: Juan Carlos Romero Hicks (PAN)
- 5th: Éctor Jaime Ramírez Barba (PAN)
- 6th: María del Pilar Ortega Martínez (PAN)
- 7th: Karen González Márquez (PAN)
- 8th: Justino Arriaga Rojas (PAN)
- 9th: Janet Melanie Murillo Chávez (PAN)
- 10th: Lilia Villafuerte Zavala (PVEM)
- 11th: Jorge Arturo Espadas Galván (PAN)
- 12th: Sarai Núñez Cerón (PAN)
- 13th: Emmanuel Reyes Carmona (MRN)
- 14th: María Eugenia Espinosa Rivas (PAN)
- 15th: Sergio Fernando Ascencio Barba (PAN)

==== Guerrero ====
- 1st: Víctor Alfonso Mojica Wences (PT)
- 2nd: Araceli Ocampo Manzanares (PES)
- 3rd: María del Carmen Cabrera Lagunas (MRN)
- 4th: Abelina López Rodríguez (MRN)
- 5th: Javier Manzano Salazar (MRN)
- 6th: Raymundo García Gutiérrez (PRD)
- 7th: Carlos Sánchez Barrios (MRN)
- 8th: Rubén Cayetano García (MRN)
- 9th: María del Rosario Merlín (PT)

==== Hidalgo ====
- 1st: Fortunato Rivera Castillo (MRN)
- 2nd: Cipriano Charrez Pedraza (MRN)
- 3rd: Sandra Olvera Bautista (MRN)
- 4th: María Isabel Alfaro Morales (MRN)
- 5th: Julio César Ángeles Mendoza (MRN)
- 6th: Lidia García Anaya (MRN)
- 7th: Jannet Téllez Infante (MRN)

==== Jalisco ====
- 1st: Eduardo Ron Ramos (MC)
- 2nd: Martha Esthela Romo Cuéllar (PAN)
- 3rd: Guadalupe Romo Romo (PAN)
- 4th: Mario Alberto Rodríguez Carrillo (MC)
- 5th: Lorena Jiménez Andrade (MRN)
- 6th: Fabiola Loya Hernández (MC)
- 7th: Juan Carlos Villarreal Salazar (MC)
- 8th: Abril Alcalá Padilla (PRD)
- 9th: Carmen Prudencio González (MC)
- 10th: Geraldina Isabel Herrera Vega (MC)
- 11th: Kehila Ku Escalante (MC)
- 12th: Adriana Gabriela Medina Ortiz (MC)
- 13th: Lourdes Contreras González (MC)
- 14th: Juan Francisco Ramírez Salcido (MC)
- 15th: Absalón García Ochoa (PAN)
- 16th: Laura Imelda Pérez Segura (PT)
- 17th: Juan Martín Espinoza Cárdenas (MC)
- 18th: Mónica Almeida López (PRD)
- 19th: Alberto Esquer Gutiérrez (MC)
- 20th: Ana Priscila González García (MC)

==== Mexico ====
- 1st: Ricardo Aguilar Castillo (PRI)
- 2nd: Dionicia Vázquez García (MRN)
- 3rd: María Teresa Marú Mejía (PT)
- 4th: Nelly Carrasco Godínez (MRN)
- 5th: Francisco Favela Peñuñuri (PT)
- 6th: Carolina García Aguilar (PES)
- 7th: Xóchitl Zagal Ramírez (PES)
- 8th: Gustavo Contreras Montes (MRN)
- 9th: Eduardo Zarzosa Sánchez (PRI)
- 10th: Alma Delia Navarrete Rivera (PES)
- 11th: María Eugenia Hernández Pérez (MRN)
- 12th: Felipe Rafael Arvizu de la Luz (MRN)
- 13th: María Elizabeth Díaz García (MRN)
- 14th: Claudia Domínguez Vázquez (MRN)
- 15th: Raúl Ernesto Sánchez Barrales (PT)
- 16th: Emilio Manzanilla Téllez (PT)
- 17th: María Guadalupe Román Ávila (MRN)
- 18th: Claudia Reyes Montiel (PRD)
- 19th: Ulises Murguía Soto (MRN)
- 20th: Juan Pablo Sánchez Rodríguez (MRN)
- 21st: Graciela Sánchez Ortiz (PES)
- 22nd: María Teresa Rosa Mora Ríos (PT)
- 23rd: David Orihuela Nava (MRN)
- 24th: Ángeles Huerta del Río (MRN)
- 25th: Delfino López Aparicio (MRN)
- 26th: Esmeralda Moreno Medina (MRN)
- 27th: Óscar González Yáñez (MRN)
- 28th: Roberto Domínguez Rodríguez (MRN)
- 29th: Martha Robles Ortiz (MRN)
- 30th: César Agustín Hernández Pérez (MRN)
- 31st: Juan Ángel Bautista Bravo (MRN)
- 32nd: Luis Enrique Martínez Ventura (PT)
- 33rd: Vicente Onofre Vázquez (MRN)
- 34th: Miroslava Carrillo Martínez (MRN)
- 35th: Arturo Roberto Hernández Tapia (PT)
- 36th: Cruz Roa Sánchez (PRI)
- 37th: Pedro Zenteno Santaella (MRN)
- 38th: Karla Yuritzi Almazán Burgos (MRN)
- 39th: José Luis Montalvo Luna (PT)
- 40th: Marco Antonio Reyes Colín (PT)
- 41st: Nancy Reséndiz Hernández (PES)

==== Michoacán ====
- 1st: Feliciano Flores Anguiano (MRN)
- 2nd: Esteban Barajas Barajas (MRN)
- 3rd: Mary Carmen Bernal Martínez (PT)
- 4th: Armando Tejeda Cid (PAN)
- 5th: Yolanda Guerrero Barrera (MRN)
- 6th: Anita Sánchez Castro (MRN)
- 7th: Gonzalo Herrera Pérez (MRN)
- 8th: Ana Lilia Guillén Quiroz (MRN)
- 9th: Ignacio Campos Equihua (MRN)
- 10th: Ivan Arturo Pérez Negrón Ruiz (PES)
- 11th: José Guadalupe Aguilera Rojas (PRD)
- 12th: Francisco Javier Huacus Esquivel (PT)

==== Morelos ====
- 1st: Alejandro Mojica Toledo (PES)
- 2nd: Alejandra Pani Barragán (MRN)
- 3rd: Juanita Guerra Mena (PT)
- 4th: Jorge Argüelles Victorero (PES)
- 5th: José Guadalupe Ambrocio Gachuz (MRN)

==== Nayarit ====
- 1st: Miguel Pavel Jarero Velázquez (PT)
- 2nd: Geraldine Ponce Méndez (MRN)
- 3rd: Mirtha Iliana Villalvazo Amaya (MRN)

==== Nuevo León ====
- 1st: Hernán Salinas Wolberg (PAN)
- 2nd: María Guillermina Alvarado Moreno (PES)
- 3rd: José Luis García Duque (PT)
- 4th: Ricardo Flores Suárez (PAN)
- 5th: Santiago González Soto (PT)
- 6th: Annia Gómez Cárdenas (PAN)
- 7th: Laura Garza Gutiérrez (PT)
- 8th: Ernesto Vargas Contreras (PES)
- 9th: Juan Francisco Espinoza Eguía (PRI)
- 10th: José Martín López Cisneros (PAN)
- 11th: Ernesto Alfonso Robledo (PAN)
- 12th: Sandra González Castañeda (PES)

==== Oaxaca ====
- 1st: Irineo Molina Espinoza (MRN)
- 2nd: Irma Juan Carlos (MRN)
- 3rd: Margarita García García (PT)
- 4th: Azael Santiago Chepi (MRN)
- 5th: Carol Antonio Altamirano (MRN)
- 6th: Beatriz Pérez López (MRN)
- 7th: Rosalinda Domínguez Flores (MRN)
- 8th: Benjamín Robles Montoya (PT)
- 9th: Maria del Carmen Bautista Peláez (MRN)
- 10th: Daniel Gutiérrez Gutiérrez (MRN)

==== Puebla ====
- 1st: Miguel Acundo González (PES) (Note: Miguel Acundo González died of COVID-19 on 16 September 2020.)
- 2nd: Maiella Gómez Maldonado (MC)
- 3rd: Claudio Báez Ruiz (PT)
- 4th: Inés Parra Juárez (MRN)
- 5th: Lizeth Sánchez García (PT)
- 6th: Alejandro Carvajal Hidalgo (PT)
- 7th: Edgar Guzmán Valdéz (PT)
- 8th: Julieta Vences Valencia (MRN)
- 9th: José Guillermo Aréchiga (MRN)
- 10th: Nayeli Salvatori Bojalil (PES)
- 11th: Saúl Huerta Corona (MRN)
- 12th: Fernando Manzanilla Prieto (PES)
- 13th: Héctor Jiménez y Meneses (MRN)
- 14th: Nelly Maceda Carrera (PT)
- 15th: Alejandro Barroso Chávez (PT)

==== Querétaro ====
- 1st: Sonia Rocha Acosta (PAN)
- 2nd: Jorge Luis Montes Nieves (MRN)
- 3rd: Beatriz Robles Gutiérrez (MRN)
- 4th: Felipe Macías Olvera (PAN)
- 5th: Ana Paola López Birlain (PAN)

==== Quintana Roo ====
- 1st: Adriana Teissier Zavala (PES)
- 2nd: Patricia Palma Olvera (MRN)
- 3rd: Mildred Ávila Vera (MRN)
- 4th: Jesús Pool Moo (PRD)

==== San Luis Potosí ====
- 1st: Sara Rocha Medina (PRI)
- 2nd: Ricardo Gallardo Cardona (PVEM)
- 3rd: Óscar Bautista Villegas (PRI)
- 4th: José Ricardo Delsol Estrada (PT)
- 5th: Josefina Salazar Báez (PAN)
- 6th: Guadalupe Almaguer Pardo (PRD)
- 7th: Marcelino Rivera Hernández (PAN)

==== Sinaloa ====
- 1st: Maximiliano Ruiz Arias (PT)
- 2nd: Jaime Montes Salas (MRN)
- 3rd: Jesus Garcia Hernandez (MRN)
- 4th: Casimiro Zamora Valdéz (MRN)
- 5th: Yadira Santiago Marcos (MRN)
- 6th: Olegaria Carrazco Macias (MRN)
- 7th: Merary Villegas Sanchez (MRN)

==== Sonora ====
- 1st: Manuel Baldenebro Arredondo (PES)
- 2nd: Ana Gabriela Guevara (PT) (until 1 December 2018)
  - Ana Bernal Camarena (PT) (from 6 December 2018)
- 3rd: Lorenia Valles Sampedro (MRN)
- 4th: Heriberto Aguilar Castillo (MRN)
- 5th: Wendy Briceño Zuloaga (MRN)
- 6th: Javier Lamarque Cano (MRN)
- 7th: Hildelisa González Morales (PT)

==== Tabasco ====
- 1st: Estela Núñez Alvarez (PES)
- 2nd: Teresa Burelo Cortázar (MRN)
- 3rd: Gregorio Espadas Méndez (MRN)
- 4th: Manuel Rodríguez González (MRN)
- 5th: Laura Patricia Avalos Magaña (MRN)
- 6th: Ricardo de la Peña Marshall (PES)

==== Tamaulipas ====
- 1st: José Salvador Rosas Quintanilla (PAN)
- 2nd: Olga Juliana Elizondo Guerra (PT)
- 3rd: Héctor Joel Villegas González (PES)
- 4th: Adriana Lozano Rodríguez (PES)
- 5th: Mario Alberto Ramos Tamez (PAN)
- 6th: Vicente Verástegui Ostos (PAN)
- 7th: Erasmo González Robledo (MRN)
- 8th: Olga Patricia Sosa Ruiz (PES)
- 9th: Armando Javier Zertuche Zuani (PT)

==== Tlaxcala ====
- 1st: Jose de la Luz Sosa Salinas (MRN)
- 2nd: Rubén Terán Águila (MRN)
- 3rd: Lorena Cuéllar Cisneros (PES) (until 1 December 2018)

==== Veracruz ====
- 1st: Ricardo García Escalante (PAN)
- 2nd: Jesús Guzmán Aviles (PAN)
- 3rd: Maria Bertha Espinoza Segura (MRN)
- 4th: Ricardo Francisco Exsome Zapata (MRN)
- 5th: Raquel Bonilla Herrera (MRN)
- 6th: Jaime Humberto Pérez Bernabe (MRN)
- 7th: Rodrigo Calderón Salas (MRN)
- 8th: Claudia Tello Espinosa (MRN)
- 9th: Carmen Mora García (MRN)
- 10th: Rafael Hernández Villalpando (MRN)
- 11th: Flora Tania Cruz Santos (MRN)
- 12th: Mariana Dunyaska García Rojas (PAN)
- 13th: Eleuterio Arrieta Sánchez (MRN)
- 14th: Carmen Medel Palma (MRN)
- 15th: Dulce María Villegas Guarneros (MRN)
- 16th: Juan Martínez Flores (MRN)
- 17th: Valentín Reyes López (MRN)
- 18th: Bonifacio Aguilar Linda (MRN)
- 19th: Paola Tenorio Adame (MRN)
- 20th: Eulalio Ríos Fararoni (MRN)

==== Yucatán ====
- 1st: Jesús Carlos Vidal Peniche (PVEM)
- 2nd: María Ester Alonzo Morales (PRI)
- 3rd: Limbert Interian Gallegos (MRN) (Note: Roger Aguilar Salazar, who was elected to the seat, died on 5 September 2018, and was never sworn in. Interian Gallegos was sworn in on 13 September.)
- 4th: Elías Lixa Abimerhi (PAN)
- 5th: Juan José Canul Pérez (PRI)

==== Zacatecas ====
- 1st: Mirna Zabeida Maldonado Tapia (PES)
- 2nd: Lyndiana Bugarín Cortes (PVEM)
- 3rd: Alfredo Femat Bañuelos (PT)
- 4th: Samuel Herrera Chávez (MRN)

Chamber composition by district Held by PAN Held by PRI Held by PRD Held by PT Held by PVEM Held by MC Held by MRN Held by PES

=== Deputies by proportional representation ===
Chamber composition by proportional representation

Region	Deputy	Party	Region	Deputy	Party
First	Patricia Terrazas Baca	PAN	Third	Alejandro Ponce Cobos	Morena
First	Ernesto Ruffo Appel	PAN	Third	Patricia del Carmen de la Cruz Delucio	Morena
First	Martha Elena García Gómez	PAN	Third	Irán Santiago Manuel	Morena
First	José Rigoberto Mares Aguilar	PAN	Third	Lizeth Amayrani Guerra Méndez	Morena
First	Madeleine Bonnafoux Alcaraz	PAN	Third	Julio Carranza Áreas	Morena
First	José Ramón Cambero Pérez	PAN	Third	Beatriz Dominga Pérez López	Morena
First	Lizbeth Mata Lozano	PAN	Third	Manuel Gómez Ventura	Morena
First	Carlos Humberto Castaños Valenzuela	PAN	Third	Emeteria Claudia Martínez Aguilar	Morena
First	Benito Medina Herrera	PRI	Third	Luis Alegre Salazar	Morena
First	Lourdes Erika Sanchez Martínez	PRI	Third	Graciela Zavaleta Sánchez	Morena
First	Alfredo Villegas Arreola	PRI	Third	Ciro Sales Ruiz	Morena
First	Irma María Terán Villalobos	PRI	Third	Zaira Ochoa Valdivia	Morena
First	Isaias González Cuevas	PRI	Third	Marco Antonio Andrade Zavala	Morena
First	Hortensia María Luisa Noroña Quezada	PRI	Third	Rosalba Valencia Cruz	Morena
First	Ismael Alfredo Hernández Deras	PRI	Third	Armando Contreras Castillo	Morena
First	Margarita Flores Sánchez	PRI	Third	Ediltrudis Rodríguez Arellano	Morena
First	Verónica Beatriz Juárez Piña	PRD	Third	Marco Antonio Medina Pérez	Morena
First	Erika Mariana Rosas Uribe	PVEM	Third	Dorheny García Cayetano	Morena
First	Marco Antonio Gómez Alcantar	PVEM	Third	Víctor Blas López	Morena
First	Itzcoatl Tonatiuh Bravo Padilla	MC	Third	Edith García Rosales	Morena
First	Martha Angélica Zamudio Macías	MC	Fourth	Jorge Romero Herrera	PAN
First	Jorge Alcibiades García Lara	MC	Fourth	Adriana Dávila Fernández	PAN
First	María Libier González Anaya	MC	Fourth	Marco Antonio Adame Castillo	PAN
First	Jorge Eugenio Russo Salido	MC	Fourth	Verónica María Sobrado Rodríguez	PAN
First	Verónica Ramos Cruz	Morena	Fourth	Carlos Carreón Mejía	PAN
First	Marco Antonio Carbajal Miranda	Morena	Fourth	Ana Lucía Riojas Martínez	PAN
First	Tatiana Clouthier Carrillo	Morena	Fourth	Óscar Daniel Martínez Terrazas	PAN
First	Miguel Ángel Márquez González	Morena	Fourth	María Lucero Saldaña	PRI
First	Carmina Yadira Regalado Mardueño	Morena	Fourth	Fernando Galindo Favela	PRI
First	Francisco Javier Guzmán de la Torre	Morena	Fourth	Cynthia Iliana López Castro	PRI
First	María Teresa López Pérez	Morena	Fourth	Rene Juárez Cisneros	PRI
First	Sebastián Aguilera Brenes	Morena	Fourth	Claudia Pastor Badilla	PRI
First	Miriam Citlally Pérez Mackintosh	Morena	Fourth	Luis Eleusis Leónidas Córdova Moran	PRI
First	Alberto Villa Villegas	Morena	Fourth	Héctor Serrano Cortes	PRD
First	Lucinda Sandoval Soberanes	Morena	Fourth	Carmen Julieta Macías Rabago	PRD
First	Juan Carlos Loera de la Rosa	Morena	Fourth	Mauricio Alonso Toledo Gutiérrez	PRD
First	Katia Alejandra Castillo Lozano	Morena	Fourth	Luz Estefanía Rosas Martínez	PRD
First	Efraín Rocha Vega	Morena	Fourth	Óscar González Yáñez	PT
First	Martha Patricia Ramírez Lucero	Morena	Fourth	Arturo Escobar y Vega	PVEM
First	Manuel López Castillo	Morena	Fourth	Nayeli Arlen Fernández Cruz	PVEM
Second	Raúl Gracia Guzmán	PAN	Fourth	Martha Angélica Tagle Martínez	MC
Second	María Marcela Torres Peimbert	PAN	Fourth	María Beatriz López Chávez	Morena
Second	José Isabel Trejo Reyes	PAN	Fourth	Samuel Calderón Medina	Morena
Second	Jacquelina Martínez Juárez	PAN	Fourth	Lorena Cuéllar Cisneros	Morena
Second	Marcos Aguilar Vega	PAN	Fourth	David Bautista Rivera	Morena
Second	Sylvia Violeta Garfias Cedillo	PAN	Fourth	Brenda Espinoza López	Morena
Second	Víctor Manuel Pérez Díaz	PAN	Fourth	Moisés Ignacio Mier Velazco	Morena
Second	Nohemí Alemán Hernández	PAN	Fourth	Leticia Díaz Aguilar	Morena
Second	Xavier Azuara Zuñiga	PAN	Fourth	Lucio Ernesto Palacios Cordero	Morena
Second	Silvia Guadalupe Garza Galván	PAN	Fourth	Gabriela Cuevas Barrón	Morena
Second	Fernando Torres Graciano	PAN	Fourth	Lucio de Jesús Jiménez	Morena
Second	Isabel Margarita Guerra Villarreal	PAN	Fourth	Susana Beatriz Cuaxiloa Serrano	Morena
Second	Juan Carlos Muñoz Márquez	PAN	Fourth	Porfirio Alejandro Muñoz Ledo y Lazo de la Vega	Morena
Second	Ivonne Liliana Álvarez García	PRI	Fourth	Idalia Reyes Miguel	Morena
Second	Pedro Pablo Treviño Villarreal	PRI	Fourth	Manuel Huerta Martínez	Morena
Second	Mariana Rodríguez Mier y Terán	PRI	Fourth	Adela Piña Bernal	Morena
Second	Rubén Ignacio Moreira Valdez	PRI	Fourth	Maximino Alejandro Candelaria	Morena
Second	Frinne Azuara Yarzabal	PRI	Fourth	Lucia Flores Olivo	Morena
Second	Carlos Pavón Campos	PRI	Fourth	Agustín Reynaldo Huerta González	Morena
Second	María Alemán Muñoz Castillo	PRI	Fourth	Laura Martínez González	Morena
Second	Lenin Nelson Campos Córdova	PRI	Fifth	Iván Arturo Rodríguez Rivera	PAN
Second	Norma Adela Guel Saldívar	PRI	Fifth	Laura Angélica Rojas Hernández	PAN
Second	Frida Alejandra Esparza Márquez	PRD	Fifth	Jorge Luis Preciado Rodríguez	PAN
Second	Antonio Ortega Martínez	PRD	Fifth	María Liduvina Sandoval Mendoza	PAN
Second	Carlos Alberto Puente Salas	PVEM	Fifth	Adolfo Torres Ramírez	PAN
Second	Beatriz Manrique Guevara	PVEM	Fifth	Gloria Romero Leon	PAN
Second	Francisco Elizondo Garrido	PVEM	Fifth	Enrique Ochoa Reza	PRI
Second	María del Pilar Lozano Mac Donald	MC	Fifth	Ana Lilia Herrera Anzaldo	PRI
Second	Oscar Rafael Novella Macías	Morena	Fifth	Luis Enrique Miranda Nava	PRI
Second	Adriana Aguilar Vázquez	Morena	Fifth	Marcela Guillermina Velasco González	PRI
Second	Miguel Ángel Chico Herrera	Morena	Fifth	Brasil Acosta Peña	PRI
Second	Lidia Nallely Vargas Hernández	Morena	Fifth	Ximena Puente de la Mora	PRI
Second	Juan Israel Ramos Ruiz	Morena	Fifth	Ernesto Javier Nemer Álvarez	PRI
Second	Miroslava Sanchez Galván	Morena	Fifth	Laura Barrera Fortoul	PRI
Second	Diego Eduardo del Bosque Villarreal	Morena	Fifth	Carlos Torres Piña	PRD
Second	Martina Cazarez Yáñez	Morena	Fifth	Monica Bautista Rodríguez	PRD
Second	Cuauhtli Fernando Badillo Moreno	Morena	Fifth	Javier Salinas Narváez	PRD
Second	María Luisa Veloz Silva	Morena	Fifth	Reginaldo Sandoval Flores	PT
Second	Edelmiro Santiago Santos Díaz	Morena	Fifth	Leticia Mariana Gómez Ordaz	PVEM
Second	María de Jesús García Guardado	Morena	Fifth	Jesús Sergio Alcántara Núñez	PVEM
Third	Cecilia Anunciación Patrón Laviada	PAN	Fifth	Jacobo David Cheja Alfaro	MC
Third	Carlos Alberto Valenzuela González	PAN	Fifth	Ruth Salinas Reyes	MC
Third	Antonia Natividad Díaz Jiménez	PAN	Fifth	Socorro Bahena Jiménez	Morena
Third	Carlos Alberto Morales Vázquez	PAN	Fifth	Pedro Daniel Abasolo Sánchez	Morena
Third	María del Rosario Guzmán Avilés	PAN	Fifth	Reyna Celeste Ascencio Ortega	Morena
Third	José del Carmen Gómez Quej	PAN	Fifth	Hirepan Maya Martínez	Morena
Third	Dulce Alejandra García Morlan	PAN	Fifth	Susana Cano González	Morena
Third	Juan Ortiz Guarneros	PRI	Fifth	Horacio Duarte Olivares	Morena
Third	Dulce María Sauri Riancho	PRI	Fifth	Juana Carrillo Luna	Morena
Third	Héctor Yunes Landa	PRI	Fifth	Sergio Pérez Hernández	Morena
Third	Soraya Pérez Munguía	PRI	Fifth	Lidia García Anaya	Morena
Third	Pablo Guillermo Angulo Briceño	PRI	Fifth	Marco Antonio González Reyes	Morena
Third	Anilu Ingram Vallines	PRI	Fifth	Julieta García Zepeda	Morena
Third	Manuel Limón Hernández	PRI	Fifth	Hugo Rafael Ruiz Lustre	Morena
Third	Norma Azucena Rodríguez Zamora	PRD	Fifth	María Guadalupe Edith Castañeda Ortiz	Morena
Third	Manuel García Corpus	PRD	Fifth	Francisco Javier Ramírez Navarrete	Morena
Third	Maribel Martínez Ruiz	PT	Fifth	María Chávez Pérez	Morena
Third	Jorge Emilio González Martínez	PVEM	Fifth	Agustín García Rubio	Morena
Third	Ana Patricia Peralta de la Peña	PVEM	Fifth	Edith Marisol Mercado Torres	Morena
Third	Dulce María Méndez de la Luz Danzón	MC	Fifth	Alejandro Viedma Velázquez	Morena

== See also ==
- Category:Deputies of the LXIV Legislature of Mexico
