= Noé Castañón Ramírez =

Mexican politician (born 1977)

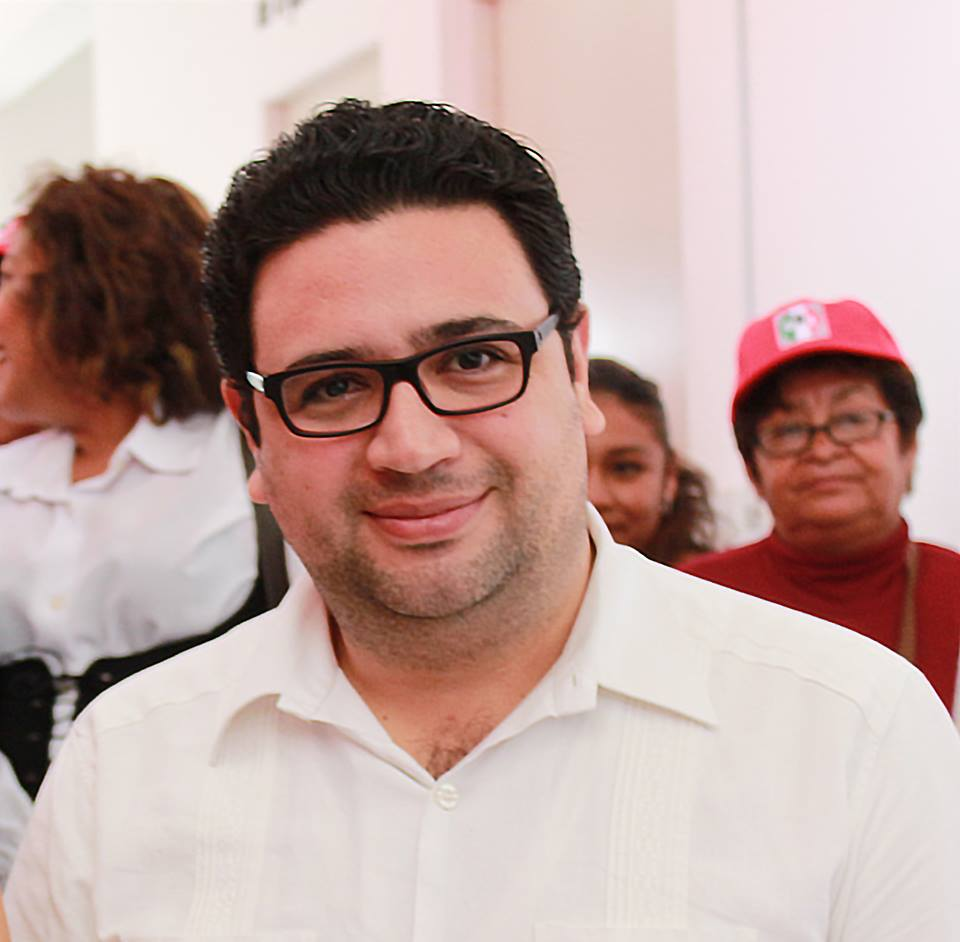

Senator of the Congress of the Union for Chiapas
- Incumbent
- Assumed office 30 October 2018 Serving with Oscar Eduardo Ramírez Aguilar and Sasil de León Villard
- Preceded by: Zoé Alejandro Robledo

Personal details
- Born: Noé Fernando Castañón Ramírez; 24 September 1977 (age 48) Chiapas, Mexico
- Party: Citizens' Movement
- Other political affiliations: PRI
- Parent: Noé Castañón León (father)
- Education: Universidad Iberoamericana; London Metropolitan University; Complutense University of Madrid; Business Institute
- Occupation: Politician

Noé Fernando Castañón Ramírez (born 24 September 1977) is a Mexican politician. Since October 30, 2018, he is a senator of the Union Congress in the LXIV legislature representing the state of Chiapas. He is part of the Movimiento Ciudadano bench. He was a local deputy of the Congress of Chiapas from 2012 to 2015.

== Early years ==
Noé Fernando Castañón Ramírez was born on 24 September 1977 in the state of Chiapas, Mexico. He is the son of Noé Castañón León, who was a minister of the Supreme Court of Justice of the Nation. In 1998 he joined the Institutional Revolutionary Party (PRI). From 1998 to 2003 he studied law at the Universidad Iberoamericana. In 2003 he studied for a Diploma in Public and International Law at London Metropolitan University. From 2005 to 2007 he studied for a doctorate in government and public administration at the Complutense University of Madrid. In 2007 he studied for a master's degree in business administration at the Business Institute.

== Political career ==
From 2012 to 2015 he was a local deputy of the LXV legislature of the Congress of Chiapas for the Institutional Revolutionary Party (PRI) representing district 1, based in Tuxtla Gutiérrez, serving as president of the board of directors. From 2014 to 2017 he was president of the municipal steering committee of the PRI in Tuxtla Gutiérrez.

In the 2018 federal elections, Noé Castañón stood as a substitute for Eduardo Lozano Grajales for the position of senator of the republic representing the state of Chiapas for the Todos por México coalition, made up of the Institutional Revolutionary Party (PRI), the Ecologist Green Party of Mexico (PVEM) and New Alliance (PANAL). On June 1, a month before the elections, Lozano Grajales submitted his resignation to his nomination for the Senate, asking that his place be filled by Alejandra Lagunes. However, the National Electoral Institute (INE) determined that the application could not be delivered to another person. Consequently, Noé Castañón remained as the only member of the formula. In the July 1 elections, the candidacy presented by the "Todos por México" coalition won the first minority seat in Chiapas, a position that Castañón would occupy as a substitute for Lozano Grajales. On July 3, Eduardo Lozano Grajales asked the electoral authority to annul his resignation in order to occupy the seat he had abandoned before the elections; however, on July 7, the INE ratified Lozano Grajales' resignation and the obligation that the seat was occupied by Noé Castañón.
