= Sergio Pérez Flores =

Mexican politician

Senator of the Congress of the Union for Morelos
- Incumbent
- Assumed office 2 March 2021 Serving with Lucía Meza Guzmán and Ángel García Yáñez
- Preceded by: Radamés Salazar

Personal details
- Political party: Morena
- Education: Universidad del Valle de Cuernavaca; Centro de Investigación en Docencia y Humanidades de Cuernavaca; University of Western Brittany
- Occupation: Politician

Sergio Pérez Flores is a Mexican politician affiliated with the National Regeneration Movement party. Since February 2021, he has been a senator of the Congress of the Union representing the state of Morelos.

== Political career ==
Pérez Flores studied a bachelor's degree in computer science at the Universidad del Valle de Cuernavaca, a master's degree in political and social sciences at the Centro de Investigación en Docencia y Humanidades de Cuernavaca, and another master's degree in administration at the University of Western Brittany. From 2009 to 2012 he held various positions within the city council of Temixco, Morelos.

In the 2018 federal elections, he was nominated by the National Regeneration Movement party as a substitute for Radamés Salazar Solorio. From 2019 to 2020 he was appointed deputy delegate of the Ministry of Welfare in the state of Morelos. On February 21, 2021, after the death of Salazar Solorio, he was appointed senator of the republic for the LXIV Legislature. Within the congress, he is secretary of the commission on foreign relations with Europe.
