= Elí Cervantes =

Mexican politician (born 1983)

Elí César Eduardo Cervantes Rojas (Note: In this Mexican name, the surname is Cervantes and the second or maternal family name is Rojas.) (born 22 October 1983) is a Mexican politician and teacher affiliated with the National Regeneration Movement (Morena). From May 2021 to August 2024, he was a senator representing the state of San Luis Potosí.

== Early years ==
Elí Cervantes Rojas was born on 22 October 1983 in Soledad de Graciano Sánchez, San Luis Potosí. He studied a bachelor's degree in primary education at the Benemérita y Centenaria Normal School of San Luis Potosí, a master's degree in primary education and pedagogical intervention at the State Research Institute, and a master's degree in higher education teaching at Tangamanga University.

== Political career ==
In the 2015 federal elections, he was nominated by the National Regeneration Movement as a candidate for federal deputy. In the 2018 federal elections, he stood as the alternate of Primo Dothé Mata, who secured San Luis Potosí's third Senate seat for the 64th and 65th legislatures of the Congress of the Union. On 12 May 2021, Cervantes Rojas took office as senator after Dothé Mata resigned from the seat. Following the end of his Senate term, he took office as the deelgate of the Secretariat of Infrastructure, Communications and Transportation (SICT) in San Luis Potosí in March 2025.

On 28 September 2026, Morena announced Cervantes Rojas as the "state coordinator for the defense of the transformation and national sovereignty", in which capacity he is expected to represent the party in the San Luis Potosí gubernatorial election of 6 June 2027.
