= Lucía Meza Guzmán =

Mexican politician

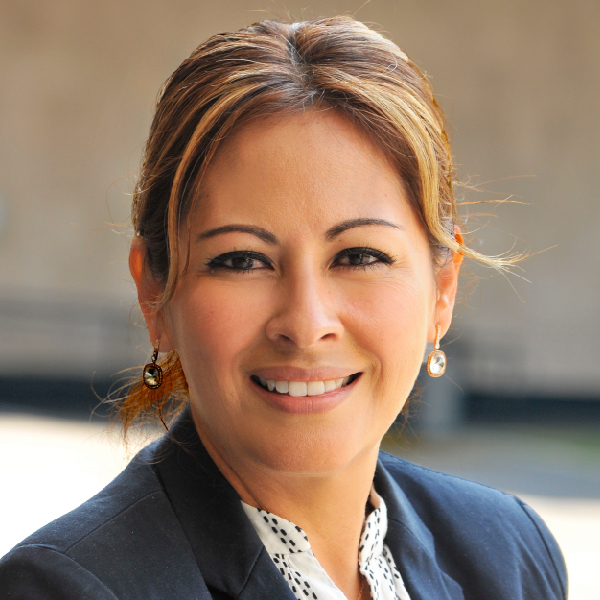
- Photograph of Lucy Meza

First Formula Senator of the Congress of the Union from Morelos
- Incumbent
- Assumed office 1 September 2018 Serving with Radamés Salazar Solorio and Ángel García Yáñez
- Preceded by: Fidel Demédicis Hidalgo

Personal details
- Born: Lucía Virginia Meza Guzmán; 13 December 1975 (age 50) Cuautla, Morelos, Mexico
- Party: PRI
- Education: Universidad Latinoamericana

Lucía Virginia Meza Guzmán (born 13 December 1975) is a Mexican politician and senator to the LXIV Legislature of the Mexican Congress from the state of Morelos. She had previously served as a federal deputy in the LXIII Legislature of the Mexican Congress. Meza Guzmán is affiliated with the Institutional Revolutionary Party (PRI).

== Political career ==
Meza Guzmán obtained her undergraduate degree in public administration from the Universidad Latinoamericana.

Meza Guzmán joined the Party of the Democratic Revolution (PRD) in 1998, serving as a youth coordinator in various positions from 2000 to 2002. Simultaneously, she coordinated welfare programs in Cuautla (from 1998 to 2000) then offered technical assistance to the welfare and public works department of Atlatlahuacan (from 2001 to 2003). In 2003, she began a three-year term on the municipal council of Cuautla. She then became a state councilor for the PRD in 2002, 2005 and 2008 and a national councilor in 2011 and 2014.

In 2006, Meza Guzmán was elected to the first of two terms in the state congress. In the 50th Legislature, she was the president of the Policy and Government Board and led the PRD faction. After that term ended, Meza Guzmán ran for the municipal presidency of Cuautla.

Three years later, voters in the 15th state district, composed of southern Cuautla, returned Meza Guzmán to the state legislature. In her second tour in Cuernavaca, she became president of the Board of Directors, as well as the Constitutional Points and Legislation Commission; she also served on three other committees.

In 2015, she won election to the federal Chamber of Deputies from the third district of Morelos, which is centered on Cuautla. She sat on the Finance and Public Credit, Housing, and Radio and Television Commissions.

=== Party switch and election to the Senate ===
Meza left the PRD in November 2017, stating that the party had lost its ideological way and become antidemocratic. The next week, she affiliated with Morena. She was elected to the Senate as one of the two Juntos Haremos Historia candidates, alongside Radamés Salazar Solorio.

=== 2024 gubernatorial race ===
Meza Guzmán is contending for the governorship of Morelos in the 2 June 2024 election as the candidate of the Fuerza y Corazón por México coalition.

== Nonprofits ==
In 2010, Meza Guzmán founded the civil association Pervivir, A.C., and began serving as an adviser to Casa de Diálogo, A.C.

== See also ==
- List of people from Morelos
