= Graciela Gaitán Díaz =

Mexican politician

Senator of the Congress of the Union for San Luis Potosí
- Incumbent
- Assumed office 4 March 2021 Serving with Marco Antonio Gama Basarte and Elí César Eduardo Cervantes Rojas
- Preceded by: Leonor Noyola Cervantes

Personal details
- Born: María Graciela Gaitán Díaz Soledad de Graciano Sánchez, San Luis Potosí, Mexico
- Party: PVEM
- Other political affiliations: PDR (until 2019)
- Occupation: Politician

María Graciela Gaitán Díaz is a Mexican politician affiliated with the Ecologist Green Party of Mexico. Since 4 March 2021, she is a senator representing the state of San Luis Potosí.

== Political career ==
María Graciela Gaitán Díaz was born in Soledad de Graciano Sánchez, San Luis Potosí. She studied training as a primary school teacher at the Normal School «Patria». From 2005 to 2012 she held various positions within the public administration. From 2012 to 2015 she was councilor of the municipality of Soledad de Graciano Sánchez representing the Party of the Democratic Revolution. From 15 September 2015 to 14 September 2018, she was a local deputy in the LXI Legislature of the Congress of San Luis Potosí, representing the 9th district. Within congress, she was vice president of the political coordination board. She was also president of the education, culture, science and technology commission.

In the 2018 federal elections, she was nominated as a substitute for Leonor Noyola Cervantes, candidate for senator of the Congress of the Union for the Party of the Democratic Revolution. After the elections, they received the first formula seat representing the state of San Luis Potosí. In 2019 the formula announced its change of bench to the Green Ecologist Party of Mexico. On 4 March 2021, she assumed the senator seat after Noyola Cervantes' request for leave.
