= Ovidio Peralta Suárez =

Mexican politician

Ovidio Peralta Suarez

Senator of the Congress of the Union for Tabasco
- Incumbent
- Assumed office Since December 4, 2018

Personal details
- Born: February 10, 1982 (age 44) Comalcalco, Tabasco
- Party: Morena

Ovidio Peralta Suárez (born 10 February 1982) is a Mexican politician and businessman, member of the Morena. Since December 4, 2018, he has been a Senator of the Republic representing the state of Tabasco in the LXIV Legislature of the Congress of the Union.

== Early life ==
Ovidio Salvador Peralta Suárez was born on February 10, 1982, in Comalcalco, Tabasco. He is the son of Salvador Peralta Méndez and Araceli Suárez González. In 1999 he studied public accounting at Olmeca University in Villahermosa. In 2005 he married Laura Alejandra Rodríguez Olán and they have two children.

== Political career ==
In the 2018 federal elections, he was nominated by Morena as a substitute for Javier May Rodríguez, a candidate for senator from the state of Tabasco. After the elections May Rodríguez occupied the seat of second formula senator. On November 29, 2018, May Rodríguez left the seat to be appointed undersecretary of planning, evaluation and regional development of the Ministry of Welfare. On December 4, 2018, Ovidio Peralta Suárez assumes the seat of Senator of the Republic in the LXIV Legislature of the Congress of the Union. Within the congress, Peralta Suárez is chairman of the youth and sports commission, and secretary of the agrarian reform commission.
