= Arturo Bours Griffith =

Mexican politician and businessman

Senator of the Congress of the Union for Sonora
- Incumbent
- Assumed office 8 November 2018 Serving with Lilly Téllez and Sylvana Beltrones Sánchez
- Preceded by: Alfonso Durazo

Personal details
- Born: 7 April 1955 (age 71) Cajeme, Sonora, Mexico
- Party: Morena
- Education: University of Arizona
- Occupation: Politician, businessman

Arturo Bours Griffith (born 7 April 1955) is a Mexican politician and businessman, affiliated with the National Regeneration Movement party. He is a majority partner of the Bachoco company and director of the Megacable Comunicaciones company. Since November 2018, he has been a senator of the republic representing the state of Sonora.

== Trajectory ==
Arturo Bours Griffith was born on 7 April 1955 in Cajeme, Sonora. He received a bachelor's degree in business administration from the University of Arizona. Since 1994 he has been the majority partner of the Bachoco food company and since 2006 he has been the director of the cable television company Megacable Comunicaciones. He also has shares in the companies Taxis Aéreos del Noroeste and Centro de Servicios Empresariales del Norte.

In the 2018 federal elections, he was nominated as a substitute for Morena Senatorial candidate Alfonso Durazo, representing the state of Sonora. They were elected by the second formula. Since 8 November 2018, he has been a senator of the republic, replacing Durazo in the LXIV and LXV Legislature of the Congress of the Union. Within the congress, he is secretary of the commission for urban development, territorial planning and housing.

== Controversies ==
Bours Griffith has been denounced by Roberto Rendón López, a former director of Bachoco, on the accusation of having committed criminal association, falsification of documents, fraud, false judicial statements, and provocation of a crime in his administration of the Bachoco and Megacable companies. Rendón López's complaint states that his identity was impersonated by Bours Griffith to carry out fraudulent procedures within the company, which he could not have carried out because at that time he was imprisoned for the crime of tax fraud.
