= Julen Rementería del Puerto =

Mexican politician

Senator for Veracruz First minority
- In office 1 September 2018 – 31 August 2024
- Preceded by: María del Rosario Guzmán Avilés
- Succeeded by: Miguel Ángel Yunes Márquez

Personal details
- Born: 21 July 1961 (age 65)
- Party: National Action Party
- Occupation: Politician
- Website: Senate website

Julen Rementería del Puerto (born 21 July 1961) is a Mexican politician who served as senator from Veracruz in the LXIV Legislature of the Mexican Congress. He is a member of the National Action Party. He represented the state of Veracruz de Ignacio de la Llave for the first minority from 2018 until 2024.

== Early life ==
Rementería del Puerto was born on 21 July 1961.

== Political career ==
On 30 November 2016, the governor-elect of Veracruz, Miguel Ángel Yunes Linares, announced that Rementería del Puerto would serve in his administration's cabinet as the head of the state's Ministry of Infrastructure and Public Works. Rementería del Puerto served until 8 February 2018, when he resigned his position to run for the Senate of the Republic.

Rementería del Puerto was assigned the Senate first minority seat of Veracruz in the LXIV Legislature on behalf of the National Action Party–Party of the Democratic Revolution coalition following the 2018 general election, replacing María del Rosario Guzmán Avilés. He represents the state alongside senators Ricardo Ahued Bardahuil and Rocío Nahle García.

During his time in office, he signed the Madrid Charter, joining an alliance of right-wing and far-right individuals organized by the Spanish political party Vox.

=== Committee assignments ===
Rementería del Puerto is a member of the following Senate committees:

- Committee on Communications and Transportation
- Committee on Constitutional Matters
- Committee on Energy (Secretary)
- Committee on Hydraulic Resources
- Committee on Regulations and Parliamentary Practices (President)
