= Itzcóatl Tonatiuh Bravo Padilla =

Mexican politician (born 1960)

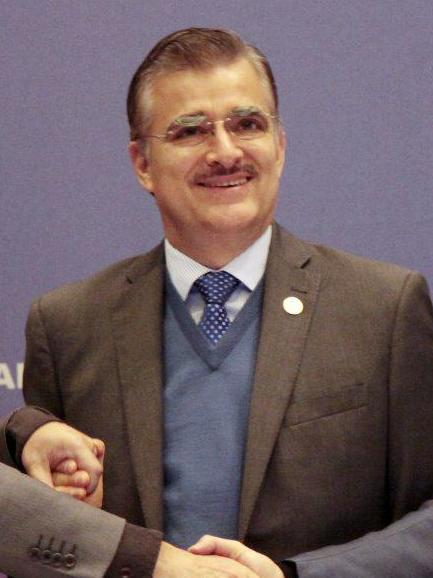

Deputy of the Congress of the Union from MC (1st region)
- Incumbent
- Assumed office 29 August 2018
- Preceded by: Clemente Castañeda Hoeflich

Rector of the University of Guadalajara
- In office 1 April 2013 – 16 March 2018
- Succeeded by: Miguel Ángel Navarro Navarro

Deputy to the Congress of the Union from the PRD (1st region)
- In office 29 August 2006 – 31 August 2009

Senator of the Congress of the Union from the PRD
- In office 1994–1997

Personal details
- Born: 7 February 1960 (age 66) Guadalajara, Jalisco, Mexico
- Party: MC
- Education: University of Guadalajara
- Occupation: Academic, economist and politician

Itzcóatl Tonatiuh Bravo Padilla (born 7 February 1960) is a Mexican academic, economist and politician from Movimiento Ciudadano who was elected to serve as a federal deputy in the LXIV Legislature of the Mexican Congress. From 2013 to 2018, he served as the 28th rector of the Universidad de Guadalajara. He was also a federal deputy in the LVI and LX Legislatures.

== Life ==
In 1982, Bravo graduated from the University of Guadalajara with a degree in economics specialized in the public sector; he was the head of the Federation of Students of Guadalajara between 1986 and 1989. Bravo worked at the school for most of his career, in roles including head of a preparatory school, professor in the public policy and higher education policy programs, head of the university's school of economics (CUCEA), and head of public relations. He also obtained a master's degree in public administration from the University of New Mexico in 1992.

In 1994, Bravo won election as a Party of the Democratic Revolution (PRD) candidate to the LVI Legislature, declaring himself independent the same year of his election and serving the entire legislature without a party affiliation. He returned to the PRD in time to be the party's candidate for municipal president of Guadalajara in 1997; he did not win, but he did obtain enough votes to become a city councilor.

The PRD returned Bravo to the Chamber of Deputies in 2006 as a proportional representation deputy. In the LX Legislature, he was the president of the Public Education and Educational Services Commission and also held two other commission assignments.

=== Term as rector ===
On 31 January 2013, the General University Council elected Bravo as the university's rector for a six-year term from 1 April 2013 to 31 March 2019.

=== Senate candidacy ===
In February 2018, Bravo announced his intention to step down from the university when he was registered by the National Electoral Institute as a proportional representation candidate for federal deputy from Movimiento Ciudadano. He was replaced by Miguel Ángel Navarro, effective 16 March 2018. One of Bravo's final official acts was the presentation of an encyclopedia covering the history of the university.
