= Ernesto Pérez Astorga =

Ernesto Pérez Astorga (born 8 August 1962) is a Mexican politician and businessman, affiliated with the National Regeneration Movement party. He was a senator of the Congress of the Union in the LXIV Legislature representing the state of Veracruz from May 28, 2019, to April 30, 2020.

== Early years ==
Ernesto Pérez Astorga was born on 8 August 1962, in the port of Veracruz, Mexico. He later lived in Coatepec, Veracruz. From 1980 to 1984 he studied a bachelor's degree in business administration at the Instituto Tecnológico y de Estudios Superiores de Monterrey and later a master's degree in Innovation for Business Development at the same institution. He was a member of the Chamber of Commerce and the Business Coordinating Council, holding various positions in both organizations.

== Political career ==
In the 2018 federal elections, he was nominated by the National Regeneration Movement party as a substitute for Ricardo Ahued Bardahuil to be senator of the Republic. After the elections, Ahued Bardahuil occupied the seat of second-party senator representing the State of Veracruz.

He was secretary of economic and port development of the State of Veracruz from 1 December 2018, to 28 May 2019, during the governorship of Cuitláhuac García Jiménez. He left office to take over as substitute for Senator of the Republic Ricardo Ahued, after he was named Director General of Customs. Within the senate, Pérez Astorga held the position of secretary of the Asia-Pacific-Africa foreign relations commission. He left the seat on April 30, 2020, after Ricardo Ahued announced his resignation from the customs administration and decided to rejoin the Senate.

On 1 April 2021, he rejoined the Senate following Ricardo Ahued's request for leave to run as a candidate for the municipal presidency of Xalapa in the state elections of Veracruz.
