= Óscar González Yáñez =

Mexican politician

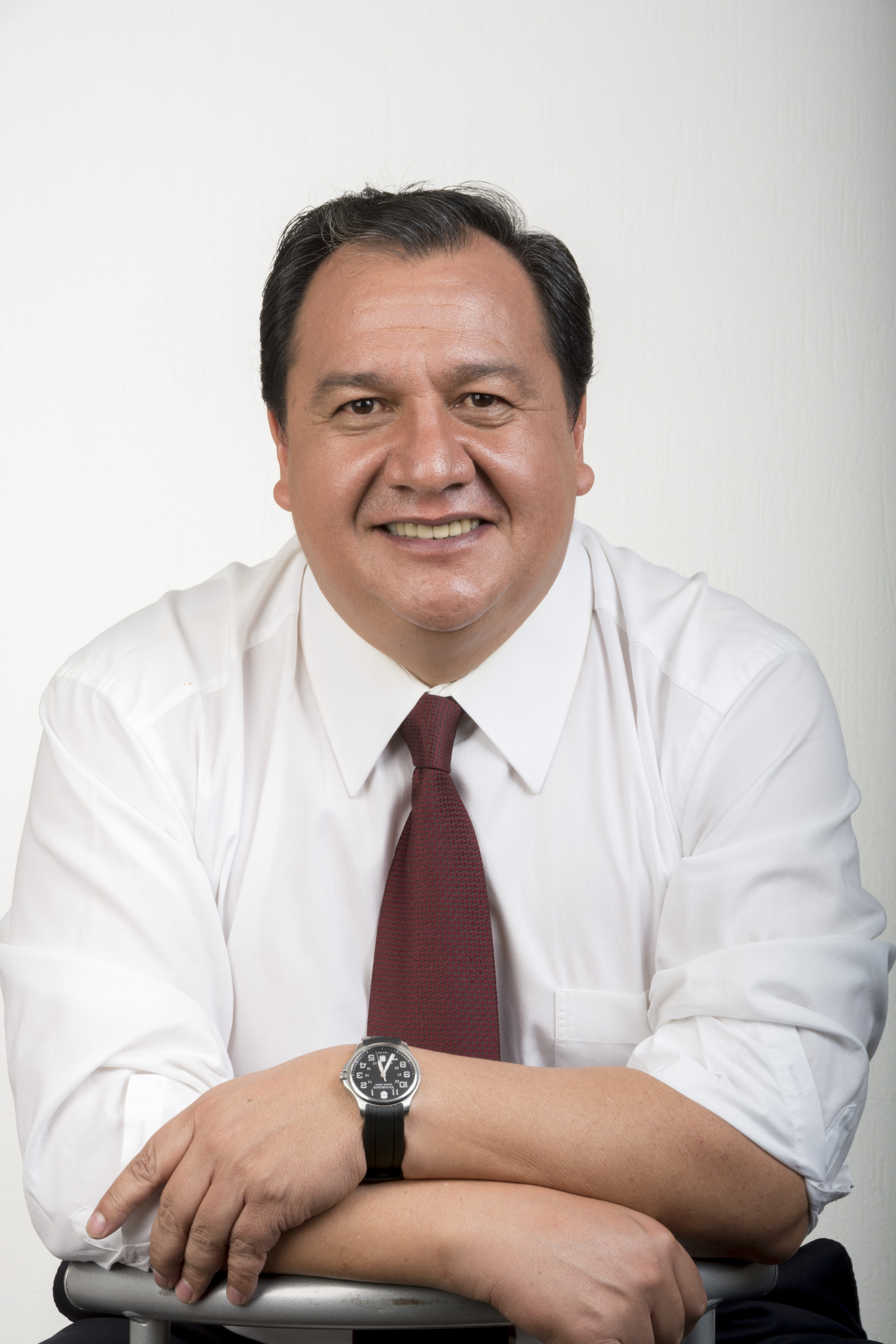
- Born: 6 October 1964 (age 61); Mexico City, Mexico
- Education: UNAM
- Occupation: Politician
- Political party: PT

Óscar González Yáñez (born 6 October 1964) is a Mexican politician from the Labor Party (PT). He served in the Chamber of Deputies during the 59th, 61st and 64th sessions of Congress representing the State of Mexico. He also served as a local deputy in the 54th session of the Congress of the State of Mexico.
