= Katya Elizabeth Ávila Vázquez =

Mexican politician

Katya Elizabeth Ávila Vázquez is a Mexican politician. She is a multi-member senator of the LXIV Legislature and LXV Legislature for the Social Encounter Party.

== Education ==
She has a bachelor's degree and is considered an intern.

== Career ==
She was a collaborator in agencies of the government of Mexico City and a collaborator in agencies of the Federal Public Administration for 7 years, and also focuses on the promotion and defense of human rights and the gender perspective.

== Senate ==
She is the current secretary of the board of directors, secretary of administration, and is a member of the following commissions:

- Youth and Sports.
- Metropolitan Areas and Mobility.
- Urban Development, Territorial Planning and Housing.
- Development and Social Welfare.
- Special Commission to monitor the implementation of the T-MEC.
- Working Group to analyze the support mechanisms for workers who have lost their jobs or have seen their income reduced due to the health contingency.
