= Nancy Guadalupe Sánchez Arredondo =

Mexican politician (born 1965)

Nancy Guadalupe Sánchez Arredondo (born 02 December 1965) is a Mexican politician. Since September 2024, she has been a member of the Congress of the Union.

== Early years and family ==
Nancy Guadalupe Sánchez Arredondo was born on December 02, 1965, in Los Mochis, Sinaloa. Since she was five years old she has lived in the state of Baja California. From 1982 to 1984 she studied a bachelor's degree in social work at the Technical School of Social Work of Mexicali, and from 1985 to 1987 she studied a specialty in hearing and language at the Oral Hearing Institute of Mexicali.

She has four sons.

== Political career ==
In 1989, Sanchez Arredondo joined the Institutional Revolutionary Party (PRI). In 2007 she was party leader in the municipality of Mexicali. In the 2009 federal elections, she was a substitute for Samuel Ramos Flores, candidate for federal representative of district 1 of the state of Baja California. In the 2010 state elections, she was elected as a representative of the XX Legislature of the Congress of Baja California for the state's 2nd district, based in Mexicali. In the 2012 federal elections, she was nominated by the PRI as a second-party senator. From 2013 to 2015 she was the party's state leader in Baja California.

In the 2015 federal elections, Sanchez Arredondo was appointed as a proportional representation federal deputy for the PRI. Within the congress she was secretary of the wine industry commission. In the 2018 federal elections she was designated as a substitute for Vanessa Rubio Márquez, candidate for multi-member senator for the Institutional Revolutionary Party. In 2019 she resigned from the PRI to join the team of Governor Jaime Bonilla Valdez, of the National Regeneration Movement party. In July 2020, after Vanessa Rubio left her position as senator, Sánchez Arredondo took her seat in the senate, joining Morena's bench.
