= María del Pilar Lozano MacDonald =

Mexican politician

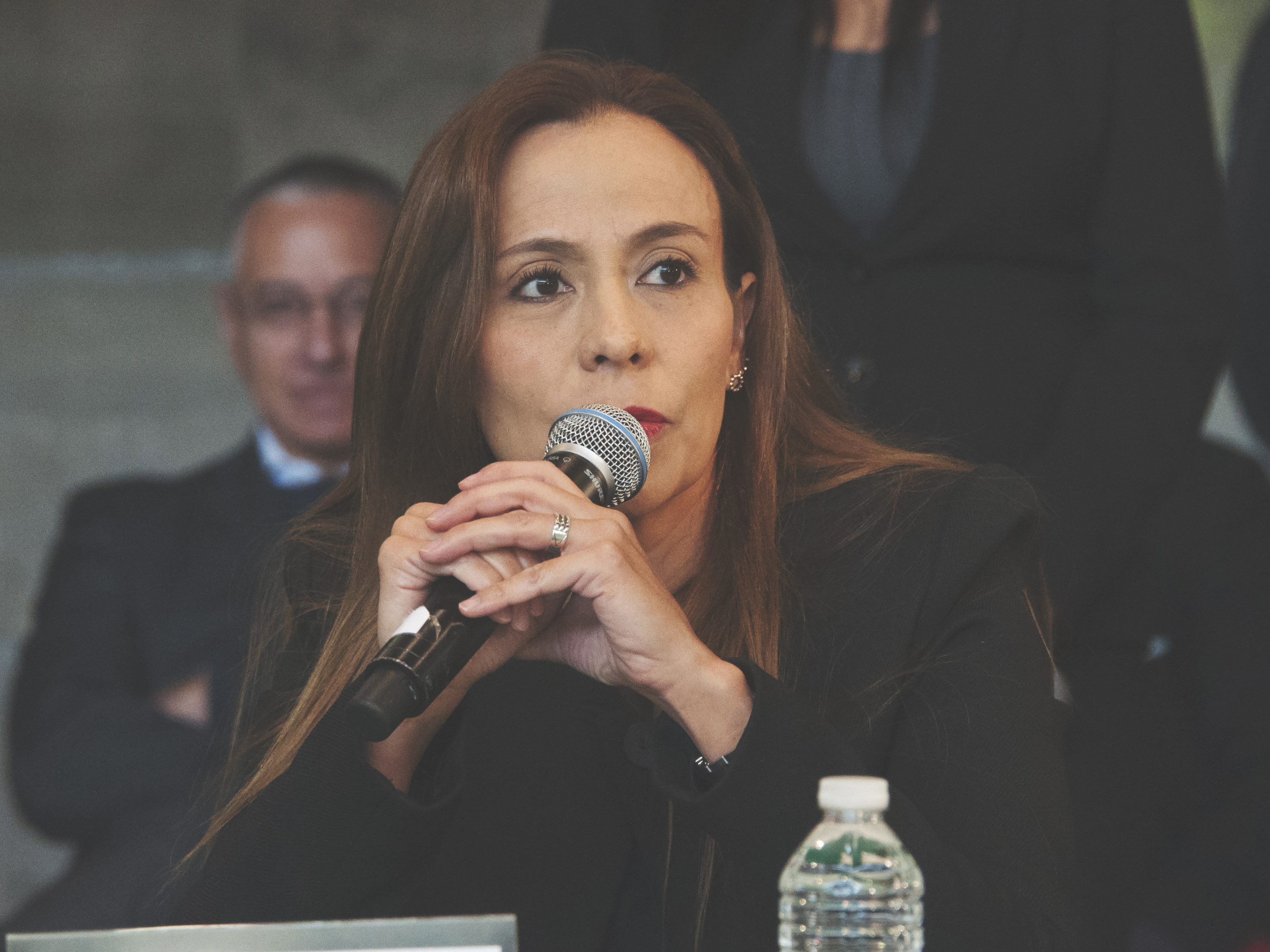

Personal details
- Born: 10 October 1984 (age 41)
- Citizenship: Mexican
- Party: MC
- Education: Universidad Autónoma Metropolitana; University of Valencia

María del Pilar Lozano MacDonald (born 10 October 1974) is a Mexican politician affiliated with the Citizens' Movement party. She served as a federal deputy in the LXIV Legislature of the Mexican Congress. She was president of the Commission for Metropolitan, Urban Development, Territorial Planning and Mobility.

== Education ==
Lozano earned her undergraduate degree in veterinary medicine from the Universidad Autónoma Metropolitana and her master's degree in foreign policy from the University of Valencia in Spain. She has also completed a Diploma in Political Institutions of the United States and Bilateral Relations at the Center for US Mexico Studies in San Diego, California.

== Political career ==
Between 2014 and 2018 she was state coordinator of the Citizens' Movement in Nuevo León and general secretary of the Citizen Movement Agreements.

Within her career, she has stood out for his work with migrants and with the Mexican migrant community living in the United States. In 2018, she served as Liaison Coordinator with Migrants of the Coalition of “Por México al Frente”.

Her work has also focused on road safety and metropolitan development.
