= María Guadalupe Saldaña Cisneros =

María Guadalupe Saldaña Cisneros (Puruándiro, Michoacán de Ocampo; March 30, 1972) is a Mexican politician, a member of the National Action Party. Since September 1, 2018, she has been a senator of the Republic in the LXIV legislature representing the state of Baja California Sur.

== Early years ==
María Guadalupe Saldaña Cisneros was born on March 30, 1972, in Puruándiro, Michoacán, Mexico. She studied elementary education at the Benemérita Escuela Normal Urbana "Profesor Domingo Carballo Félix". From 1994 to 2002 she worked as an elementary school teacher in several public schools. From 2006 to 2007 she was an advisor at the Universidad Pedagógica Nacional.

== Political career ==
On August 17, 1996, she became a member of the National Action Party (PAN). From 2002 to 2005 she was councilwoman of the municipality of Los Cabos during the municipal presidency of Ulises Omar Ceseña Montaño. In 2005 she was a candidate for congressional deputy of the State of Baja California Sur. From 2011 to 2012 she was a general secretary of the National Action Party in the state of Baja California Sur. In the 2012 federal elections she was candidate for senator of the Republic for the PAN for the state of Baja California Sur. From 2012 to 2014 she was representative of Governor Marcos Alberto Covarrubias Villaseñor to the municipality of Los Cabos.

From 2015 to 2018 she was a deputy of the Congress of the State of Baja California Sur in the XIV legislature representing the VIII district of the state. From 2017 to 2018 she was a national councilor of the National Action Party.

== Senator of the Republic ==
In the 2018 federal elections she was nominated by the National Action Party as senator for the state of Baja California Sur. After the elections she held the position as first minority senator in the LXIV Legislature of the Congress of the Union since September 1, 2018. Within the congress she is secretary of the board of directors of the Senate of the Republic. She is also secretary of the environment, natural resources and climate change committee.
