= Ricardo Ahued =

Mexican politician

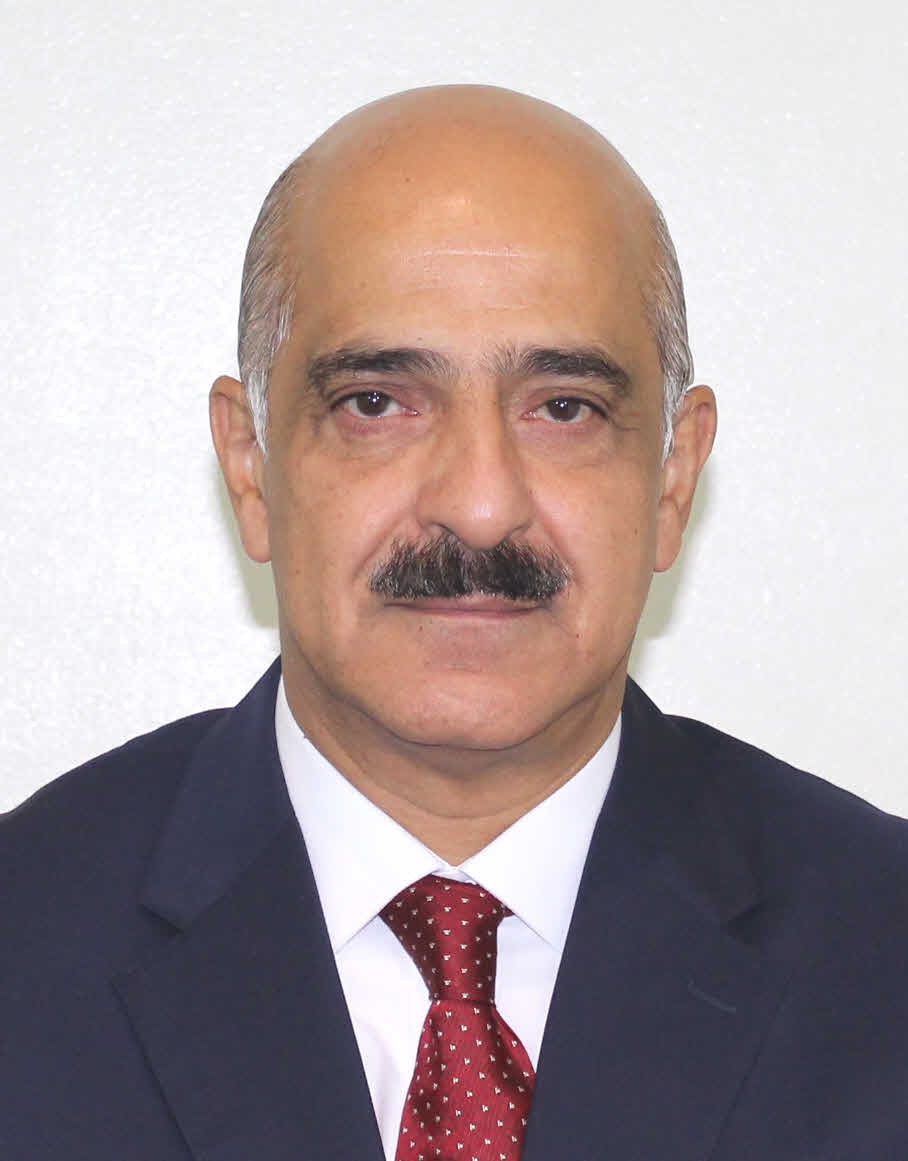
- Ahued Bardahuil in 2019

Secretary of Government of Veracruz
- Incumbent
- Assumed office 1 December 2024
- Governor: Rocío Nahle
- Preceded by: Carlos Alberto Juarez Gil

Municipal president of Xalapa
- In office 1 January 2022 – 30 November 2024
- Preceded by: Pedro Hipólito Rodríguez
- Succeeded by: Alberto Islas Reyes
- In office 1 January 2005 – 31 December 2007
- Preceded by: Armida Ramírez Corral
- Succeeded by: David Velasco Chedraui

Senator of the Congress of the Union from Veracruz
- In office 30 April 2020 – 23 March 2021
- Preceded by: Ernesto Pérez Astorga
- Succeeded by: Ernesto Pérez Astorga
- In office 1 September 2018 – 28 May 2019 Serving with Rocío Nahle García and Julen Rementería del Puerto
- Preceded by: José Francisco Yunes Zorrilla
- Succeeded by: Ernesto Pérez Astorga

Personal details
- Born: 18 April 1957 (age 69) Pachuca, Hidalgo, Mexico
- Party: MORENA

Ricardo Ahued Bardahuil (born 18 April 1957) is a Mexican politician affiliated with the National Regeneration Movement (Morena) currently serving as the Secretary of Government of Veracruz under the administration of Rocío Nahle since 2024. Ahued also served from 2022 until his appointment as secretary as Municipal president of Xalapa. He served as a senator representing Veracruz in the 64th and 65th sessions of Congress. From 2009 to 2012, he was a deputy in the 61st Congress as a member of the Institutional Revolutionary Party, representing Veracruz's tenth district, and previously in 2005–2007 he was the municipal president of Xalapa.

== Political trajectory ==
Ahued started his political career in the Institutional Revolutionary Party in 1975.

Ahued was a candidate for federal deputy for the Congress of Veracruz for the 11th district, being elect for the 2009–2012 period of congress.

In 2017, after 42 years of being a member of the Institutional Revolutionary Party he left the party and endorsed Andrés Manuel López Obrador's candidacy for the presidency to the 2018 general elections, then joining the National Regeneration Movement.

In those same elections, Ahued was a candidate for the Senate by the National Regeneration Movement on its second formula alongside Rocío Nahle, winning by relative majority with 48.08% of votes, they took office on 1 September 2018.

In October 2018, the leader of the Morena party in Veracruz, Manuel Huerta Ladrón de Guevara, criticized Ahued for making remarks about the water supply in Xalapa, noting that Ahued was not a member of the party despite being in its Senate caucus.

Ahued requested indefinite leave as senator on 28 May 2019, after being named by president Andrés Manuel López Obrador to be Director of the General Administration of Customs, which he served until 23 April 2020, then returning to the senate.

In the 2021 elections, he was chosen as candidate for Municipal president of Xalapa in Veracruz, by the Juntos Hacemos Historia electoral alliance, and won for the 2022–2025 period with 115,510 votes in favor.
