= Elvia Marcela Mora Arellano =

Elvia Marcela Mora Arellano is a Mexican politician. She is a multi-member senator of the LXIV legislature for the Social Encounter Party.

== Education ==
She studied a Bachelor's degree in Psychology at UAM.

She is currently studying a Master's Degree in Social Medicine and Collective Health at UAM and a Bachelor's Degree in Sociology at UNAM.

== Career ==
She was deputy director of the Casa Niñas del DIF, advisor to the Coordination of Gender Mainstreaming of INMUJERES of the Federal District. She is head of Department at the National DIF, collaborator of the Organization Secretariat of MORENA. National advisor of MORENA and representative of the National Elections Commission of MORENA.

She is the executive Director of Policy and Management at Democratic Observation and administrator of the Tertiary Sector of Grupo GLACE. National Coordinator of Applied Research at the Center for Educational and Social Studies.
