= Vanessa Rubio Márquez =

Mexican politician and economist

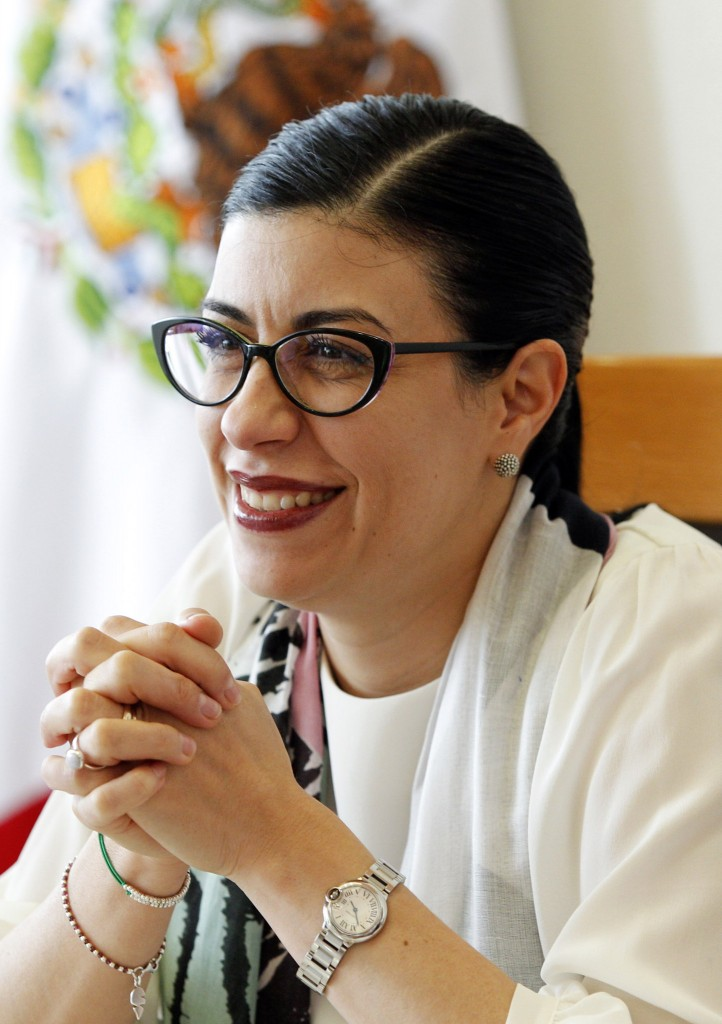

Undersecretary of Finance and Public Credit
- In office September 8, 2016 – January 19, 2018
- President: Enrique Peña Nieto
- Leader: José Antonio Meade Kuribreña
- Preceded by: Fernando Aportela

Undersecretary for Planning, Evaluation and Regional Development
- In office September 2015 – September 8, 2016
- President: Enrique Peña Nieto

Undersecretary for Latin America and the Caribbean
- Incumbent
- Assumed office January 2013
- President: Enrique Peña Nieto
- Succeeded by: Socorro Flores Liera

Personal details
- Born: Vanessa Rubio; 21 February 1972 (age 54) Mexico City, Mexico
- Education: National Autonomous University of Mexico; London School of Economics

Vanessa Rubio Márquez (born 21 February 1972) is a Mexican politician and economist who was Undersecretary of Finance and Public Credit of Mexico from September 2016 to January 2018. She is currently a Senator of the LXIV Legislature of the Mexican Congress. She coordinated the presidential campaign to elect José Antonio Meade Kuribreña, a candidate running in the 2018 Mexican general election. Previously, she was the Undersecretary for Planning, Evaluation and Regional Development at the Secretariat of Social Development and the Undersecretary for Latin America and the Caribbean in the Secretariat of Foreign Affairs before that.

== Early life and academic career ==
Rubio Márquez obtained her undergraduate degree in international relations from National Autonomous University of Mexico. She also attended the London School of Economics where she earned her master's degree.

== Political career ==
In her capacity as Undersecretary for Latin America and the Caribbean under Mexico's Secretariat of Foreign Affairs, Rubio-Márquez was involved in negotiations with the Bolivian Government over expansion of the free trade agreement between the two countries. As part of the talks, Rubio Márquez visited Bolivia in October 2013. On September 21, 2015, the Secretary of Foreign Affairs Claudia Ruiz Massieu named Socorro Flores Liera to succeed Rubio Márquez as Undersecretary for Latin America and the Caribbean.

On September 8, 2016, Mexican President Enrique Peña Nieto appointed Rubio Márquez as undersecretary of Finance and Public Credit.

On January 19, 2018, Rubio Márquez resigned her position as undersecretary to become the office coordinator for the presidential campaign to elect José Antonio Meade Kuribreña, an Institutional Revolutionary Party candidate running in the 2018 Mexican general election.

== Publications ==
- Rubio-Márquez, Vanessa (2009-05-14). "The G20: A Practitioner's Perspective". In Martinez-Diaz, Leonardo; Woods, Ngaire (eds.). Networks of Influence?: Developing Countries in a Networked Global Order. OUP Oxford. ISBN 9780199564422.
