= Alfonso Durazo =

Mexican politician

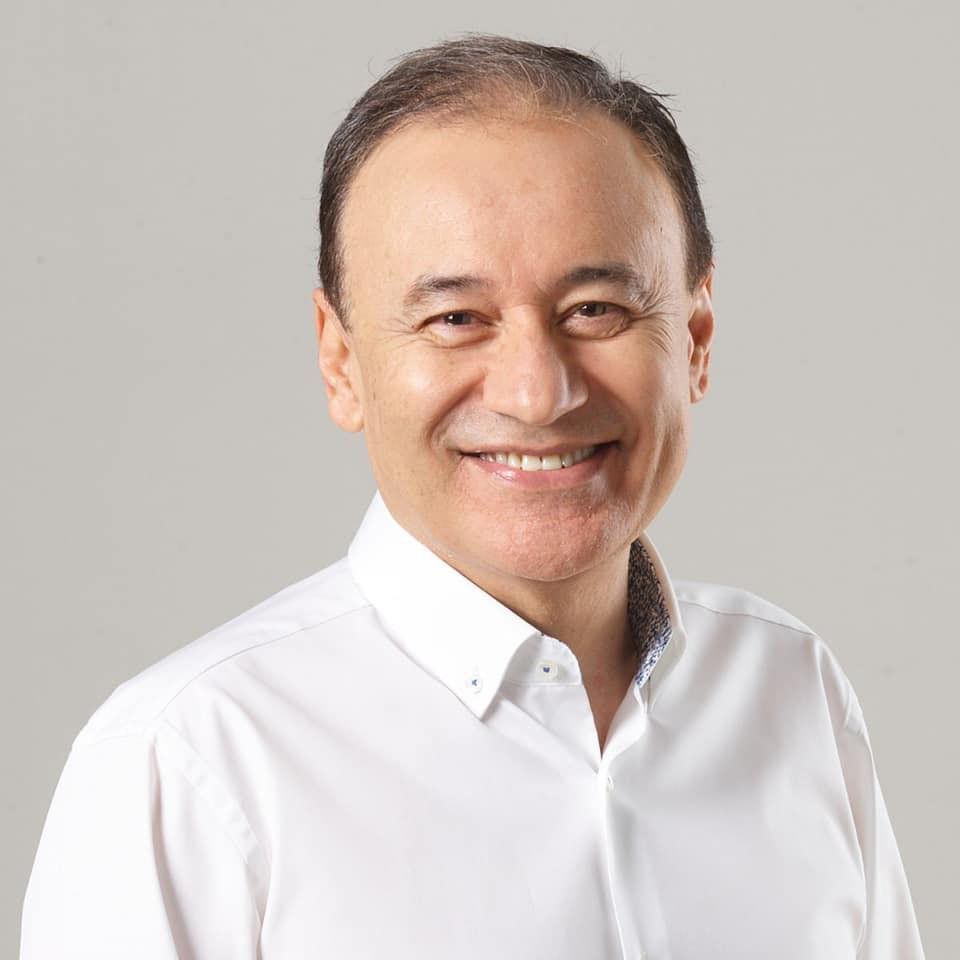

27th Governor of Sonora
- Incumbent
- Assumed office 13 September 2021
- Preceded by: Claudia Pavlovich Arellano

1st Secretary of Security and Civilian Protection
- In office 1 December 2018 – 30 October 2020
- President: Andrés Manuel López Obrador
- Preceded by: Renato Sales Heredia
- Succeeded by: Rosa Icela Rodríguez

Senator for Sonora
- In office 1 September 2018 – 8 November 2018
- Preceded by: Ernesto Gándara Camou
- Succeeded by: Arturo Bours Griffith

Member of the Chamber of Deputies Proportional representation
- In office 1 September 2012 – 31 August 2015

Personal details
- Born: Francisco Alfonso Durazo Montaño; 11 July 1954 (age 72) Bavispe, Sonora, Mexico
- Party: National Regeneration Movement
- Other political affiliations: Institutional Revolutionary Party
- Education: National Autonomous University of Mexico (BS); Metropolitan Autonomous University (LLB); Sonoran Institute of Public Administration (MPA); Monterrey Institute of Technology and Higher Education (PhD)

Francisco Alfonso Durazo Montaño (born 11 July 1954) is a Mexican politician who served as chief spokesman and private secretary of President Vicente Fox. Representing the National Regeneration Movement (MORENA), he is the current governor of Sonora.

== Early life and education ==
Alfonso Durazo was born in Bavispe, Sonora, on 11 July 1954. For elementary school, he went to the General Miguel Samaniego school. For middle school, he went to the General Plutarco Elías Calles school in Agua Prieta, Sonora. For high school he attended Instituto Soria in Hermosillo, Sonora. He holds a bachelor's degree in civil engineering from the National Autonomous University of Mexico (UNAM), a bachelor's degree in law from the Metropolitan Autonomous University (UAM), a master's degree in public administration from the Sonoran Institute of Public Administration, AC, and a doctorate in public policy from the Monterrey Institute of Technology and Higher Education (ITESM).

== Career ==
From 1992 to 1993, he served as private secretary of the Secretary of Social Development Luis Donaldo Colosio. When Colosio became the PRI's presidential candidate for the 1994 general election, Durazo continued to serve as his private secretary.

In May 2000, he resigned from the PRI and joined the presidential campaign of Vicente Fox. Fox appointed Durazo as his private secretary after the July 2000 election and, in 2003, as his presidential spokesman. Durazo resigned from his positions in 2004 and heavily criticised Fox's administration.

In March 2006, Durazo announced that he would be joining Andrés Manuel López Obrador's presidential campaign. In that year he was nominated as a Senate candidate for his home state, Sonora. In January 2012 he rejoined López Obrador's presidential campaign as general manager in the state of Sonora.

In the 2012 general election, he was elected to the Chamber of Deputies as a plurinominal deputy for the 1st region, representing the Citizens' Movement (MC); he switched allegiance to the National Regeneration Movement (Morena) in February 2015.

Following his election as president in 2018, López Obrador reestablished the Secretariat of Public Security, previously abolished by the Peña administration, and named Durazo as the head of the agency.

In the 2021 local elections, Durazo was elected to a six-year term as governor of Sonora.

== Investigative report and alleged cooperation with U.S. authorities (2025) ==
In July 2025, journalist Luis Chaparro reported on the program La Saga con Adela Micha that Durazo was under investigation by U.S. authorities for alleged links to organized crime and activities classified as terrorism. According to the report, U.S. agencies had issued an alert for Durazo and, at one point, there was reportedly an order for his arrest should he enter the United States. Durazo and his team publicly denied these allegations.

Chaparro further alleged that, despite these alerts, Durazo had been able to enter the United States multiple times over the preceding five to six years by using a special immigration status known as "parole", typically granted in exceptional circumstances such as humanitarian needs or to confidential informants. The report claimed that Durazo's repeated entries were facilitated by his cooperation as a confidential informant for U.S. federal agencies, including the FBI, DEA, and the Department of State. According to Chaparro's sources, each entry required Durazo to notify his designated case officer and undergo secondary inspection upon arrival.

These claims were based on information from multiple unnamed sources with access to official records, but have not been independently corroborated by U.S. authorities or other media outlets. Durazo has publicly denied the existence of any investigation or special arrangement with U.S. agencies.
