= Geovanna Bañuelos de la Torre =

Mexican politician

Member of the Senate of the Republic
- Incumbent
- Assumed office 2018

Member of the Congress of Zacatecas
- In office: 2016–2018; 2010–2013

Personal details
- Born: 23 February 1980 (age 46) Guadalupe, Zacatecas, Mexico
- Party: Labor Party

Geovanna del Carmen Bañuelos de la Torre (born 23 February 1980 in Guadalupe, Zacatecas) is a Mexican politician. She is a member of the Labor Party. She has been twice elected as a deputy to the Congress of Zacatecas and is currently a national list Senator and coordinator of the Labor Party caucus in the Senate of the Republic. A native of Guadalupe, Zacatecas, she received her degree in architecture from the Zacatecas Institute of Technology.

== See also ==
- LXV Legislature of the Mexican Congress
