= Francisco Elizondo Garrido =

Mexican politician

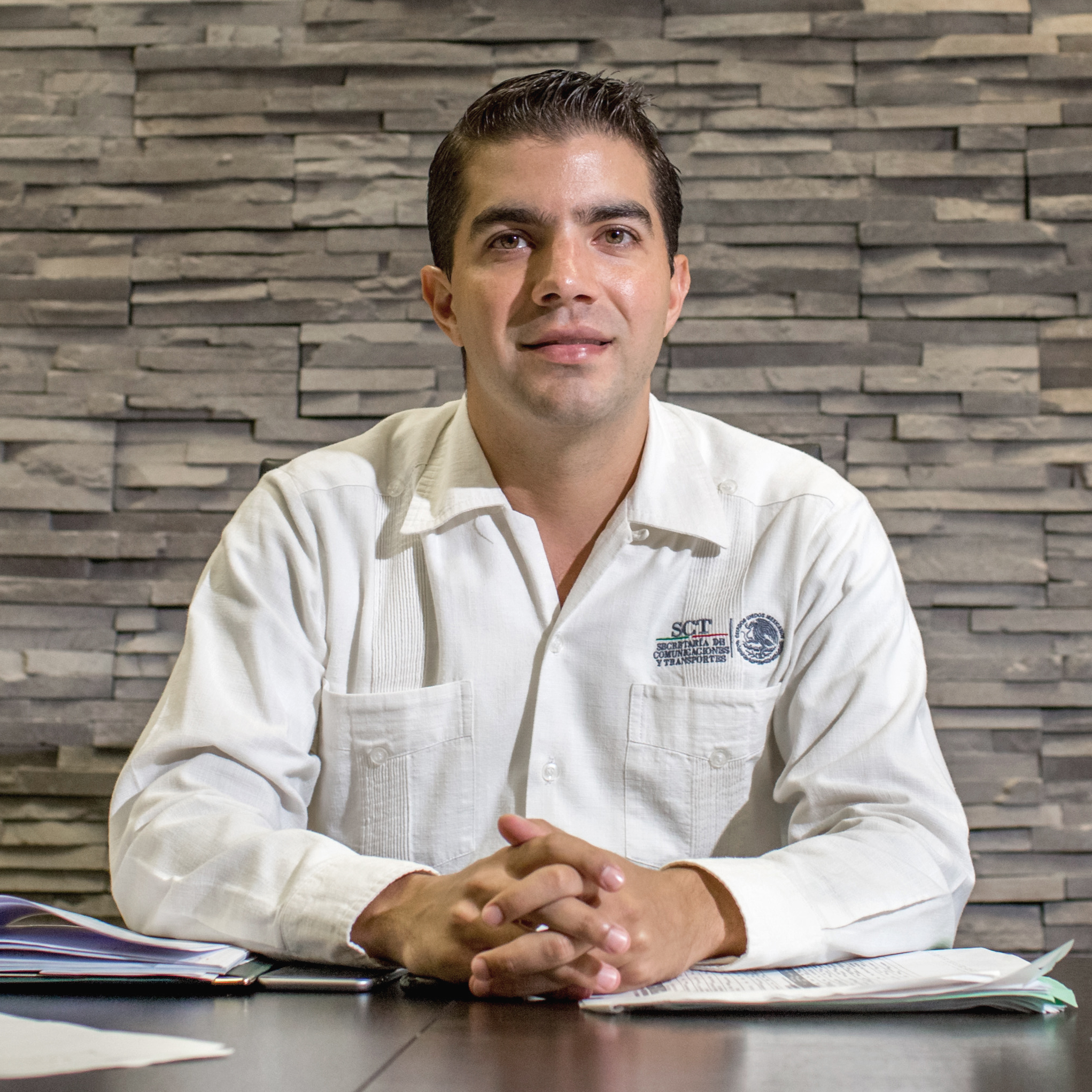
- Born: 17 January 1982 (age 44); Veracruz, Mexico
- Occupation: Politician
- Political party: PVEM

Francisco Elizondo Garrido born on January 17, 1982, in Mexico City. He is a Mexican politician affiliated to Partido Verde Ecologista de México.

== Studies ==
Graduated from Universidad Anáhuac from Law studies and obtained a Master's Degree in Constitutional Law from the same university.

Within his courses are: Labor Metamorfosis, Quality supervision in public work and corrective, preventive and improvement actions.

== Experiencia Política ==
- 2013–Present Managing Director of the Communications and Transportation Center in Quintana Roo
- 2011 - 2012 Secretary of Ecology and Environment of the state of Quintana Roo
- 2009 - 2010 Representative of the Partido Verde Ecologista de México before the National Electoral Institute
- 2006 - 2009 Federal Deputy for the PVEM in the LX Legislatura representing the State of Veracruz
- 2003 - 2006 State Delegate of the Partido Verde Ecologista de México
