= Noé Castañón León =

Mexican jurist (1948–2024)

Justice of the Supreme Court of Justice of the Nation
- In office April 18, 1985 – January 1, 1995
- Appointed by: Miguel de la Madrid

Personal details
- Born: April 15, 1948 Berriozábal, Chiapas, Mexico
- Died: April 19, 2024 (aged 76)
- Occupation: Jurist, politician

Noé Castañón León (15 April 1948 – 19 April 2024) was a Mexican lawyer and jurist. Castañón served as a Justice of the Supreme Court of Justice of the Nation from 1985 to 1995 and president of the Superior Court of Justice of Chiapas from 2006 to 2012.

Castañón, the grandson of former Chiapas Governor Samuel León Brindis, was born on 15 April 1948, in Berriozábal, Chiapas, Mexico. He died on 19 April 2024, at the age of 76.
