= Indira Rosales San Román =

Mexican politician (born 1987)

Member of the Senate of the Republic
- In office 1 September 2018 – 31 August 2024

Personal details
- Born: 30 September 1987 (age 38)
- Party: National Action Party

Indira de Jesús Rosales San Román (born 30 September 1987) is a Mexican politician serving as a member of the Congress of Veracruz since 2024. From 2018 to 2024, she was a member of the Senate of the Republic as one of the National Action Party's national-list senators.
