= Leonor Noyola Cervantes =

Mexican politician

María Leonor Noyola Cervantes (born April 25, 1962) is a Mexican politician affiliated with the Green Ecologist Party of Mexico. Since September 1, 2018, she is a senator of the republic in the LXIV Legislature of the Congress of the Union representing the state of San Luis Potosí.

== Early years ==
María Leonor Noyola Cervantes was born on April 25, 1962, in the state of San Luis Potosí, Mexico. She studied for a degree in public accounting. From 2012 to 2015 she was councilor of the municipality of Soledad de Graciano Sánchez for the Party of the Democratic Revolution (PRD). In 2014 she was appointed state delegate of the PRD in San Luis Potosí.

== Senator of the Republic ==
In the 2018 federal elections, she was nominated by the Democratic Revolution Party as a senator of the republic for the state of San Luis Potosí. After the elections, she obtained the first formula seat as of September 1, 2018 in the LXIV Legislature of the Congress of the Union. Within Congress, she is president of the indigenous affairs commission. On May 28, 2019, she left the PRD bench to join the Ecologist Green Party of Mexico (PVEM).

On March 4, 2021, she requested leave from office to run for municipal president of Soledad de Graciano Sánchez for the Juntos Haremos Historia coalition, made up of the Green Ecologist Party of Mexico and the Labor Party.
