= Armando Contreras Castillo =

Mexican politician

Personal details
- Born: 13 April 1968 (age 58) Concepción Pápalo, Oaxaca, Mexico
- Party: MORENA
- Education: UABJO

Armando Contreras Castillo (born 13 April 1968) is a Mexican politician affiliated with the National Regeneration Movement serving as a federal deputy from Oaxaca and the third electoral region. From 2010 to 2012, he was a senator in the LXI Legislature of the Mexican Congress representing Oaxaca, having been an unused alternate between 2006 and 2010 for Salomón Jara Cruz and being sworn in to replace Cruz when he left for the Oaxaca state government.
