= Primo Dothé Mata =

Mexican politician (born 1968)

Primo Dothé Mata (Note: In this Mexican name, the surname is Dothé and the second or maternal family name is Mata.) (born 5 August 1968) is a Mexican politician who was previously affiliated with the National Regeneration Movement (Morena) party. From September 2018 to April 2021, he was Senator of the Republic representing the state of San Luis Potosí in the 64th legislature of the Congress of the Union.

== Early years ==
Primo Dothé Mata was born in Tamazunchale, San Luis Potosí, on 5 August 1968. Since 1991 he has been a leader of the Doctor Salvador Nava Martínez Citizen Front in the Huasteca Potosina region.

== Senator of the Republic ==
In the 2018 federal elections, he was elected as a senator of the Republic of the first minority representing the state of San Luis Potosí. He assumed office within the 64th Legislature on 1 September 2018. Within Congress, he was the president of the third labor commission and secretary of the commission on metropolitan areas and mobility. He was secretary of the board of directors of the Senate from 31 August 2019 to 31 August 2020.

On 29 April 2021, he requested leave from his position as senator and announced his resignation from the Morena party in protest of the candidacies of the " Together We Make History " coalition in the state of San Luis Potosí for the federal and state elections. Dothé said that "in many candidacies Morena no longer represents the fourth transformation".
