= Beatriz Manrique Guevara =

Mexican politician

- Born: 20 May 1967 (age 59); León, Guanajuato, Mexico
- Occupation: Politician
- Political party: PVEM

Beatriz Manrique Guevara (born 20 May 1967) is a Mexican politician from the Ecologist Green Party of Mexico. From 2008 to 2009 she served as Deputy of the LX Legislature of the Mexican Congress representing Guanajuato.
