= Marco Antonio Gama =

Mexican politician

- Born: 18 October 1970 (age 55); San Luis Potosí, Mexico
- Education: UASLP
- Occupation: Politician
- Political party: PAN

Marco Antonio Gama Basarte (born 18 October 1970) is a Mexican politician affiliated with the National Action Party (PAN). In the 2003 mid-terms he was elected to the Chamber of Deputies to represent San Luis Potosí's 5th district during the 59th session of Congress, and previously served in the 55th session of the Congress of San Luis Potosí.
