= Alejandra Lagunes =

Mexican politician (born 1971)

Alejandra Lagunes Soto Ruiz
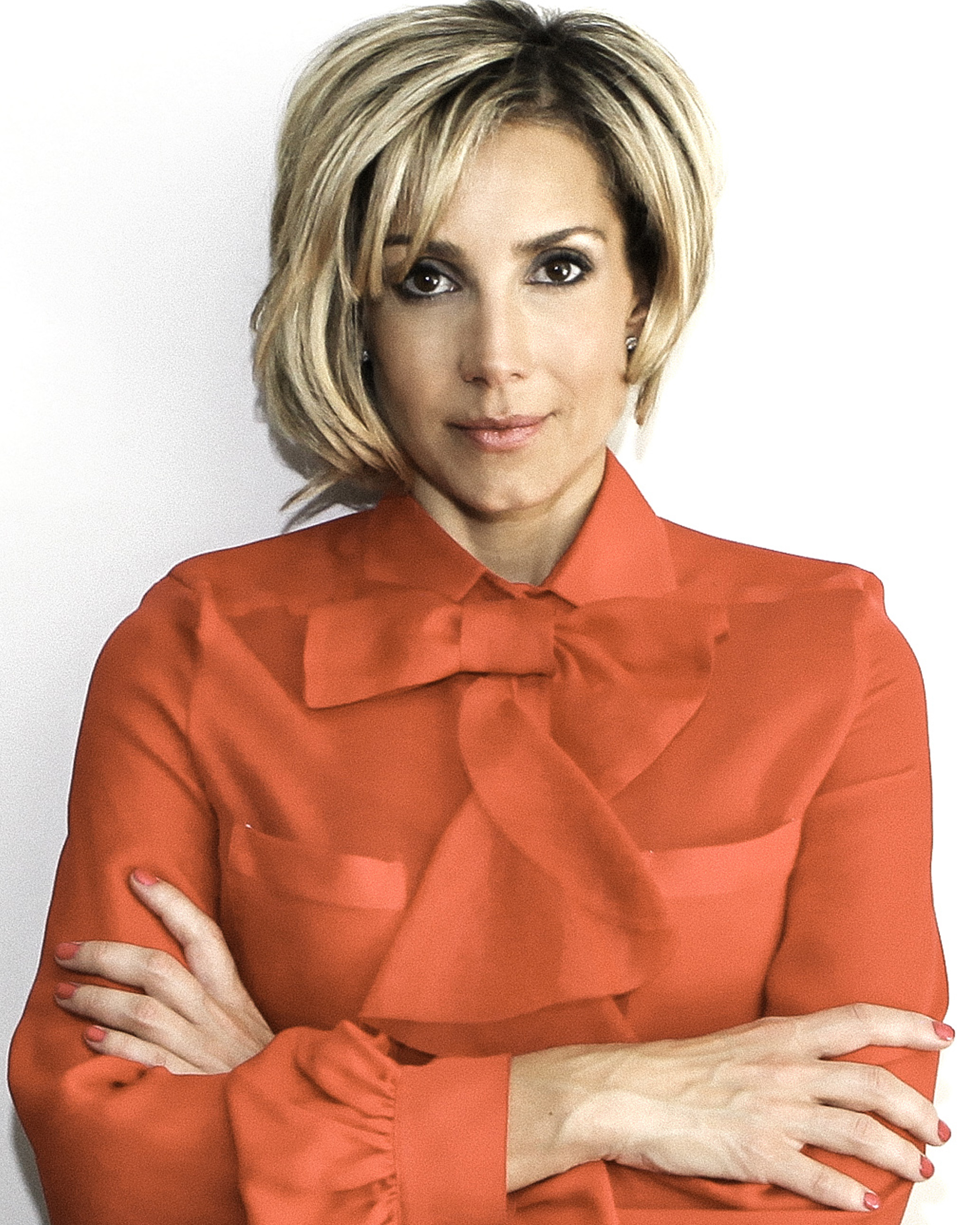
- Born: Alejandra Lagunes Soto Ruiz; December 11, 1971 (age 54); Mexico City
- Education: Instituto Tecnológico de Estudios Superiores de Monterrey
- Occupations: Coordinator of National Digital Strategy, President's Office, Mexico.
- Years active: 1990–present
- Spouse: Rafael Pacchiato Alamán
- Children: 2 children
- Website: Twitter

Alejandra Lagunes Soto Ruiz (born December 11, 1971) is a Mexican Senator. She served as National Digital Strategy Coordinator for México's Office of the Presidency (2012-2018). She was Google Mexico co-founder worked for companies as a sales manager for both MSN and Yahoo. She also worked as press chief for the presidency of Ernesto Zedillo (1994–2000).

She was named the most influential women in Mexico by Forbes."Las 50 mujeres más poderosas de México". Forbes. November 2013.

== Early life and education ==
Born in December 1971 in Mexico City; Lagunes Soto Ruiz obtained the bachelor's degree in Communication sciences at the Monterrey Institute of Technology and Higher Education(1990–1994).

After graduating, she specialized in political communications, public image and politics psychology research.

=== Early professional career ===
During Zedillo's Administration (1994–2000), Lagunes was head of the Press Office for the Presidency of Mexico until 1999. From 2000 to 2005 she was sales manager in Yahoo and led the area of strategic planning and executive MSN premium accounts.

In 2008 she co-founded Google Mexico directing the commercial area, following her experience in the field sales.

In 2009 directed the commercial and digital strategy of Televisa Interactive Media.

=== Political Positions ===
During the election and presidential transition period in 2011 and 2012, Alejandra Lagunes, coordinated the digital campaigns of several candidates of the Party of Institutional Revolution (PRI), such as Eruviel Ávila Villegas and Enrique Peña Nieto towards the Presidency.

After the election, when Peña Nieto was declared president, Lagunes was officially named head of the newly created Coordination for the National Digital Strategy at the Office of the Mexican President.

As the head of the newly created National Digital Strategy, Alejandra Lagunes was responsible for the design of the "National Digital Strategy program". A set of strategies for achieving a digital government that incorporates information and communication technologies to enable Mexico's future.

Lagunes was responsible for publishing the guiding principles of such initiative as a first step in the development of the program. The plan was officially launched by President Enrique Peña Nieto and Alejandra Lagunes on November 25, 2013 in the National Museum of Anthropology.

The program established five objectives which were: Government Transformation, Digital Economy, Quality Education, Universal and Effective Public Health, and Citizen's Security .

As Coordinator of the Digital Strategy, some of Lagunes achievements were:

• Gob.mx: The "alpha" version of the website online in the first half of 2014 and by the 2015 evolved to a "beta" version.

• The implementation of the Management Technology Federal Law.

• Free technological devices for education purposes.

• "Plan de Acción" (2013–2015): which is a 26 institutions commitment for an open and transparent government.

The Strategy was recognized by other organizations and governments around the world such U.S.A and Europe.

Under the leadership of Lagunes, Mexico was awarded by the Global Partnership for Sustainable Development Data in 2014.

Also became a member of the Family Online Safety Institute.

== Personal life ==
She married the politician Rafael Pacchiano in 2005 and former Undersecretary of Management for Environmental Protection at Semarnat. They have two children.
