= Ángel García Yáñez =

Mexican politician (born 1967)

Senator for Morelos
- Incumbent
- Assumed office 1 September 2018
- Preceded by: Lisbeth Hernández Lecona

Personal details
- Born: 14 December 1967 (age 58) Zacualpan, Morelos, Mexico
- Party: New Alliance Party, Institutional Revolutionary Party
- Occupation: Politician

Ángel García Yáñez (born 14 December 1967) is a Mexican politician affiliated at different times to the New Alliance Party (Nueva Alianza) and to the Institutional Revolutionary Party (PRI). He served as a senator in the 64th and 65th legislatures (2018–2024) from the state of Morelos. From 2015 to 2018, he represented the fifth federal electoral district of Morelos, centered on Yautepec, in the Chamber of Deputies during the 63rd legislature.

== Life ==
García Yáñez was the municipal president of Zacualpan de Amilpas from 2009 to 2012; his selection as the Institutional Revolutionary Party (PRI) candidate was marked by controversy, with opponents claiming that he had not lived in Zacualpan in more than two decades and sparking confrontations that required the intervention of police from Temoac. In 2012, he ran for and won a seat in the LII Legislature of the Congress of Morelos from the local 17th district, including Zacualpan; he was the first ever deputy from the town and the first popularly elected local deputy from the Ecologist Green Party of Mexico (PVEM) in Morelos. He was one of the legislature's highest-ranking officials: he presided over the Board of Directors and three commissions, including Network of Municipalities for Health; Finances, Budget and Public Accounts; and Science and Technological Innovation. He also was the parliamentary coordinator for the PVEM in the legislature; he left the party in early 2015 because of pressure from the state party over his support for the state budget, choosing New Alliance as his new party and becoming its parliamentary coordinator.

In 2015, voters in the fifth district sent García Yáñez to the federal Chamber of Deputies; he was the only Nueva Alianza candidate returned to San Lázaro from a district for the legislature, and the first Nueva Alianza deputy candidate ever to win a district. He beat the Party of the Democratic Revolution (PRD) contender by 539 votes. He served on three commissions: Social Development, Infrastructure, and Agriculture and Irrigation Systems. García Yáñez was elected to the Senate of the Republic for the PRI in the 2018 general election, as the first minority senator for the 2018–2024 period.

García Yáñez sought re-election as one of Morelos's senators in the 2024 Senate election, occupying the first place on the Fuerza y Corazón por México (PRI/PAN/PRD) coalition's two-name formula. His victory as the state's third senator was confirmed on 10 June.

== See also ==
- List of people from Morelos
