= Sasil de León Villard =

Mexican politician (born 1982)

Member of the Senate of the Republic
- Incumbent
- Assumed office 1 September 2018
- Constituency: Chiapas

Personal details
- Born: 8 November 1982 (age 43)
- Party: Morena (since 2023)

Sasil Dora Luz de León Villard (born 8 November 1982) is a Mexican politician serving as a member of the Senate of the Republic since 2018. From 2015 to 2017, she was a member of the Chamber of Deputies. In 2013, she was a member of the Congress of Chiapas.
