= Radamés Salazar =

Mexican politician (1974–2021)

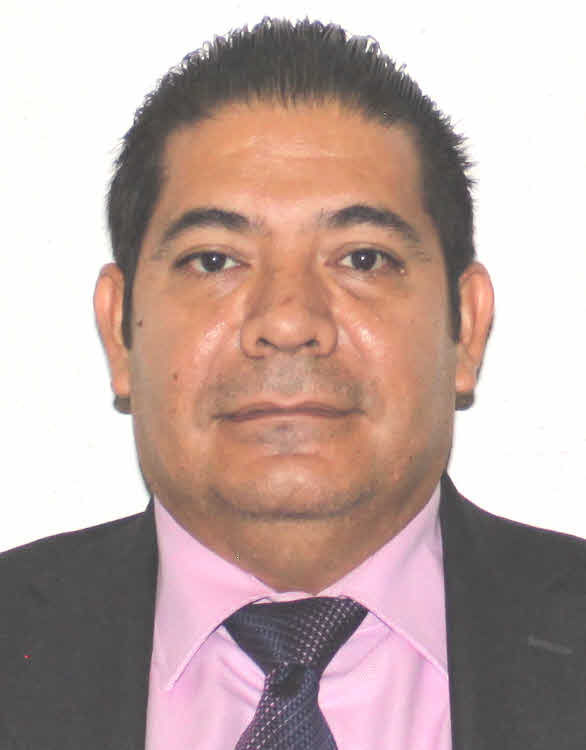
Radamés Salazar Solorio

Radamés Salazar Solorio (8 March 1974 – 21 February 2021) was a Mexican politician.

== Biography ==
Radamés Salazar Solorio was born in Jiutepec, Morelos, on 8 March 1974. In the 2018 general election he was elected to the Senate of the Republic for Morelos on the National Regeneration Movement (Morena) ticket.

Salazar died in Mexico City from COVID-19 during the COVID-19 pandemic in Mexico, fifteen days short of his 47th birthday.

== See also ==
- Rabindranath Salazar Solorio, brother
