= The Amazing Race en Discovery Channel 2 =

Season of television series

- Season 2
- The Amazing Race en Discovery Channel logo
- Presented by: Harris Whitbeck
- No. of teams: 11
- Winners: Mauricio & Carlos Coarasa
- No. of legs: 12
- Distance traveled: 17,700 km (11,000 mi)
- No. of episodes: 13

Release
- Original network: Discovery Latin America
- Original release: 26 September – 19 December 2010

Additional information
- Filming dates: 19 May – 18 June 2010

Series chronology
- ← Previous; Season 1 Next → Season 3 (on Space)

The Amazing Race en Discovery Channel 2 is the second season of The Amazing Race en Discovery Channel, a Latin American version of the American reality television show The Amazing Race. It featured eleven teams of two, with a pre-existing relationship, in a race across Latin America to win US$250,000.

The second season premiered on Sunday 26 September 2010 at 11.00 p.m. (UTC−3).

This was the final season that aired on Discovery Latin America.

Mexican brothers Mauricio and Carlos Coarasa were the winners of this season.

== Production ==
=== Development and filming ===
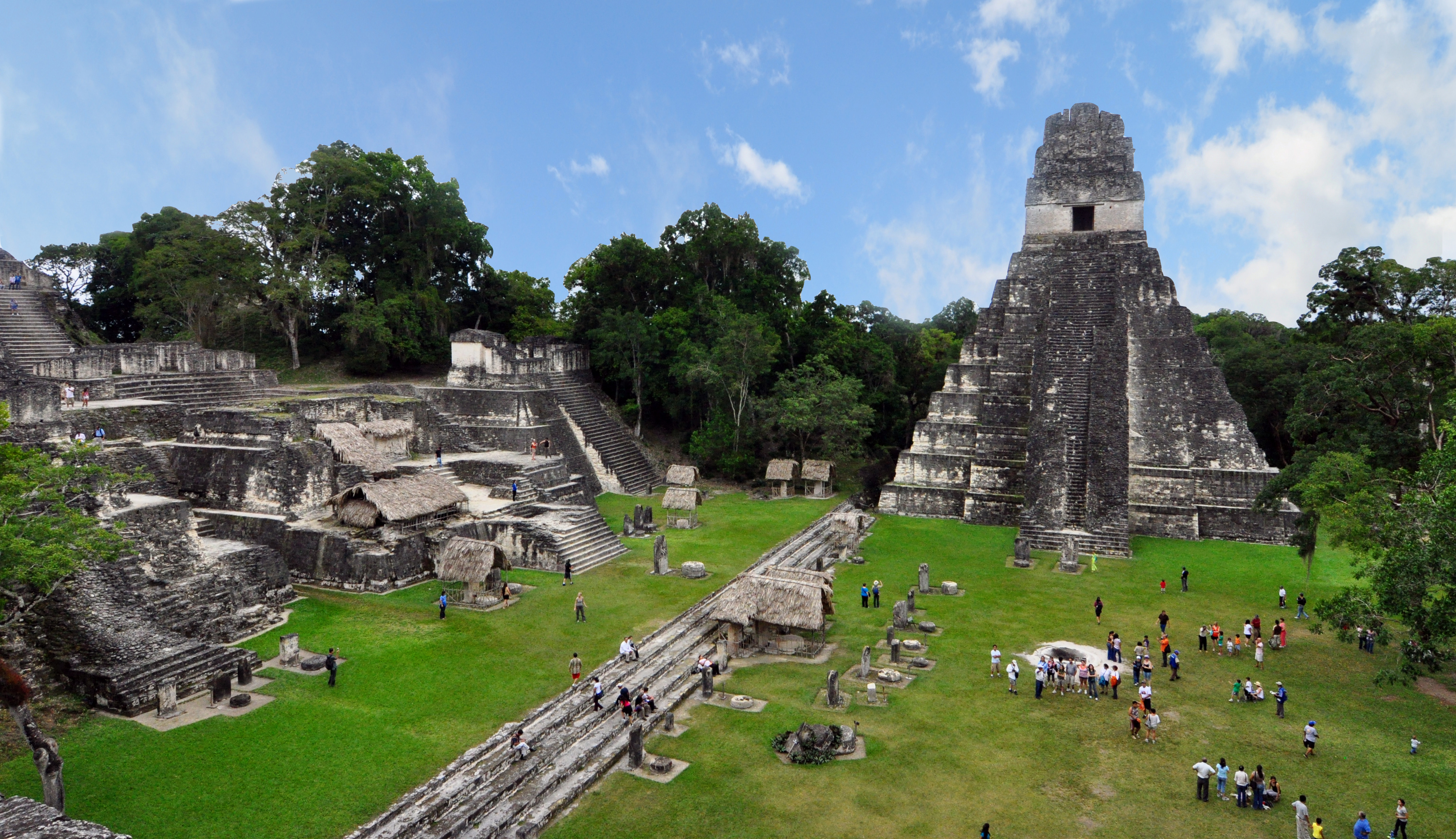
The Starting Line was located at the Templo del Jaguar in Tikal, Guatemala.

Discovery Channel greenlit the second installment in November 2009. Race locations were scouted in January 2010 and filming took place between May and June 2010. The show was broadcast in high-definition television.

Filming for the second season of The Amazing Race en Discovery Channel lasted for 25 days and covered nearly 17,700 km (11,000 mi). The second season spanned eight countries in two continents. Among them, four were unvisited countries, including Bolivia and Ecuador. The season also included the first visits for an Amazing Race franchise to Guatemala and Venezuela, both of which have not been visited by the original American version. Previously visited countries were Mexico, Brazil, and Argentina. Colombia was also visited this season and was a country that had not been visited by the original American version at the time of air, until Season 28 in 2016.

Leg 4 marked the first leg in the franchise to feature a variation of the "Intersection" marker, where teams competed against each other one-on-one in a specific task, and the winning team received their next clue while the other team was required to wait for another team before they could start the task over. If the team lost the final match, the team would incur a pre-determined time penalty (15 minutes) before receiving their next clue and could continue racing. This variation would later be renamed to "Double Battle", "Versus", "Face Off", "Duel" or "Head-to-Head" in other versions (the latter would be first officiated in the 30th season of the original American version in 2018).

The route markers in this season were coloured blue and black, including the clue envelopes and the Pit Stop. Starting from the following season, the route markers would adopt the original red and yellow scheme format.

None of the eliminated teams were present at the Finish Line.

=== Casting ===
Applications were accepted from 13 December 2009 and finished on 8 February 2010. Semi-finalist interviews were held sometime in March 2010 and the final casting interviews took place around April 2010.

=== Marketing ===
According to Discovery's official website, the four official sponsors of the second season of The Amazing Race en Discovery Channel were Bridgestone, Nintendo, Samsung and Visa. The sponsors played a major role in the series by providing prizes and integrating their products into various tasks.

== Cast ==
This season included eleven teams from Argentina, Brazil, Chile, Colombia, the Dominican Republic, Mexico, Peru, and Venezuela.

Contestants	Age	Relationship	Hometown	Status
Susy Rotstain	44	Mother & Daughter	Lima, Peru	Eliminated 1st (in Puebla, Mexico)
Stefany Porudominsky	23	Mother & Daughter	Lima, Peru	Eliminated 1st (in Puebla, Mexico)
Mariana Moreno	39	Siblings	Petrópolis, Brazil*	Eliminated 2nd (in El Tajín, Mexico)
Mauricio Moreno	42	Siblings	Concepción, Chile	Eliminated 2nd (in El Tajín, Mexico)
Roger Saliba	29	Friends	Puerto Ordaz, Venezuela	Eliminated 3rd (in Villa de Leyva, Colombia)
Omar Guedez	26	Friends	Puerto Ordaz, Venezuela	Eliminated 3rd (in Villa de Leyva, Colombia)
Javier Báez	36	Engaged	La Romana, Dominican Republic	Eliminated 4th (in Canaima National Park, Venezuela)
Jelkin Rijo	29	Engaged	La Romana, Dominican Republic	Eliminated 4th (in Canaima National Park, Venezuela)
Edison J. Perezgomez	56	Father & Son	Saltillo, Mexico	Eliminated 5th (in Niterói, Brazil)
Edison M. Perezgomez	26	Father & Son	Saltillo, Mexico	Eliminated 5th (in Niterói, Brazil)
Marietta Acosta	23	Dating	Barranquilla, Colombia	Eliminated 6th (in Córdoba, Argentina)
José Cárdenas	27	Dating	Barranquilla, Colombia	Eliminated 6th (in Córdoba, Argentina)
Esteban Portela	35	Married	Bogotá, Colombia	Eliminated 7th (in San Luis, Argentina)
Marisol Márquez	33	Married	Bogotá, Colombia	Eliminated 7th (in San Luis, Argentina)
Vinícius Lemos	25	Childhood Friends	Rio de Janeiro, Brazil	Eliminated 8th (in Copacabana, Bolivia)
Guilherme Nunes	30	Childhood Friends	Rio de Janeiro, Brazil	Eliminated 8th (in Copacabana, Bolivia)
Marlene Zichy	39	Friends	Buenos Aires, Argentina	Third Place
Aleandra Scafati	41	Friends	Buenos Aires, Argentina	Third Place
Lili Cantú	36	Married	Monterrey, Mexico	Second Place
Toño Varas	38	Married	Monterrey, Mexico	Second Place
Mauricio Coarasa	36	Brothers	Mexico City, Mexico	Winners
Carlos Coarasa	39	Brothers	Mexico City, Mexico	Winners

*Representing Chile.

== Results ==
The following teams participated in the season, with their relationships at the time of filming. Note that this table is not necessarily reflective of all content broadcast on television due to inclusion or exclusion of some data. Placements are listed in finishing order:

Team	Position (by leg)												
Team	1	2	3	4+	5	6	7	8	9	<10>	11	12^{13}	
Mauricio & Carlos	3rd	1st	3rd^{5}	2nd	1st	4th	4th^{10}	3rd^{11}	2nd	2nd	1st	2nd	1st
Toño & Lili	6th	2nd	1st	3rd	2nd	2nd	3rd	1st	1st	1st	2nd	1st	2nd
Aleandra & Marlene	8th^{1}	5th	7th	7th	7th	7th	7th	5th	3rd⊃	3rd	3rd	3rd	3rd
Guilherme & Vinícius	7th^{1}	7th	6th	5th	3rd	5th	6th	2nd	5th⊂	4th	4th		
Esteban & Marisol	9th^{2}	8th	5th^{6}	4th	6th^{9}	3rd	2nd	4th	4th	5th			
Marietta & José	4th	9th	9th	8th−	5th	6th	5th	6th	6th^{12}				
Edison & Edison	5th	3rd	2nd	1st	4th	1stƒ	1st	7th^{11}					
Jelkin & Javier	1st	6th	8th	6th	8th	8th							
Roger & Omar	2nd	4th	4th	9th^{8}									
Mauricio & Mariana	11th	10th	10th										
Susy & Stefany	10th^{3}	11th^{4}											

Key

- A red team placement indicates that the team was eliminated.
- A green ƒ indicates that the team won a Fast Forward.
- An underlined blue team placement indicates that the team came in last on a non-elimination leg and had to perform a Speed Bump in the next leg.
- A yellow > indicates that the team chose to use the Yield; < indicates the team who received it; <> around the leg number indicates that the Yield for that leg was available but not used.
- A brown ⊃ indicates means the team chose to use a U-Turn; ⊂ indicates the team who received it.
- An orange + indicates that there was an Intersection in that leg, while an orange − indicates which team lost the Intersection task and received a penalty.
- Italicized results indicate the position of the team at the midpoint of a two-episode leg.

Notes

1. ^^{a} ^{b} Guilherme & Vinícius and Aleandra & Marlene initially arrived 2nd and 5th respectively, but each team were issued 30-minute penalties because they completed the Roadblock together. Their placements were dropped to 7th and 8th place, respectively.
2. Esteban & Marisol initially arrived 7th, but were issued a 30-minute penalty because they read the clue before choosing the team member that was going to perform the Roadblock. Guilherme & Vinícius and Aleandra & Marlene checked in during their penalty time, dropping Esteban & Marisol to 9th.
3. Susy & Stefany initially arrived 10th, but were issued a 15-minute penalty because Susy read the clue without Stefany after completing the Roadblock. This did not affect their placement.
4. Susy & Stefany initially arrived 10th, but were issued a 2-hour penalty for not completing the final church task. Mauricio & Mariana checked in during their penalty time, dropping Susy & Stefany to last place and resulting in their elimination.
5. Mauricio & Carlos initially arrived 1st, but were issued a 30-minute penalty for breaking a rule during an additional task. Toño & Lili and Edison & Edison checked in during their penalty time, dropping Mauricio & Carlos to 3rd.
6. Esteban & Marisol initially arrived 5th, but were issued a 30-minute penalty as they did not complete an additional task together. This did not affect their placement.
7. ^^{a} ^{b} ^{c} It is unknown which team member completed the Roadblock in Leg 1 (All Teams marked) or 3 (Only Esteban & Marisol).
8. Roger & Omar initially arrived 7th, but were issued a 4-hour penalty for violating a race rule by trying to call someone outside of the production crew, which is strictly prohibited as of the rules. The last two teams trailing them (Aleandra & Marlene and Marietta & José) checked in during their penalty time, dropping Roger & Omar to last place and resulting in their elimination.
9. Esteban & Marisol initially arrived 4th, but were issued a 30-minute penalty as Esteban helped Marisol in the Roadblock. Edison & Edison and Marietta & José checked-in during their penalty time, dropping Esteban & Marisol to 6th.
10. Mauricio & Carlos departed 6th from the airport in Manaus, because one of the team members lost his passport and required to get a new one.
11. ^^{a} ^{b} Mauricio & Carlos and Edison & Edison initially arrived 3rd and 5th respectively, but each team were issued 30-minute penalties as they took a taxi instead of traveling by bonde as instructed in their clue. While Mauricio & Carlos' placement was not affected with the penalty, Edison & Edison's placement was dropped to last place, which resulted in their elimination.
12. José & Marietta did not complete the Detour. Already in last place, José & Marietta proceeded to the Pit Stop where they checked in and were eliminated without the penalty being issued.
13. Leg 12 was a double-length leg. It featured a Virtual Pit Stop, and had one Detour (first half) and two Roadblocks shown over two episodes.

== Prizes ==
The prize for each leg is awarded to the first place team for that leg.

- Leg 1 – A Wii for each team member.
- Leg 2 – A Wii for each team member.
- Leg 3 – A mountain bike for each team member.
- Leg 4 – A kayak for each team member.
- Leg 5 – A US$1,000 Visa Prepaid Card for each team member.
- Leg 6 – A US$1,000 Visa Prepaid Card for each team member and a Wii.
- Leg 7 – A trip for two to São Paulo, Brazil.
- Leg 8 – A trip for two to Rio de Janeiro, Brazil during the 2014 FIFA World Cup or 2016 Summer Olympics and US$1,000 Visa Travel Money.
- Leg 9 – Stay in a hotel from Visa Luxury hotel collection and US$1,000 Visa Travel Money.
- Leg 10 – A Samsung LED TV and a Wii.
- Leg 11 – A reward for Visa Travel Experience and US$1,000 Visa Travel Money courtesy.
- Leg 12 – US$250,000

== Race summary ==
Route Map.

Destinations	Air travel Rail travel Water travel Bus travel Helicopter travel Bicycle travel Gondola travel
Route Markers	Desvío (Detour) Obstáculo (Roadblock) Avance (Fast Forward) Alto (Yield); Intersección (Intersection) Retorno (U-Turn) Multa (Speed Bump) Parada (Pit Stop)

=== Leg 1 (Guatemala) ===
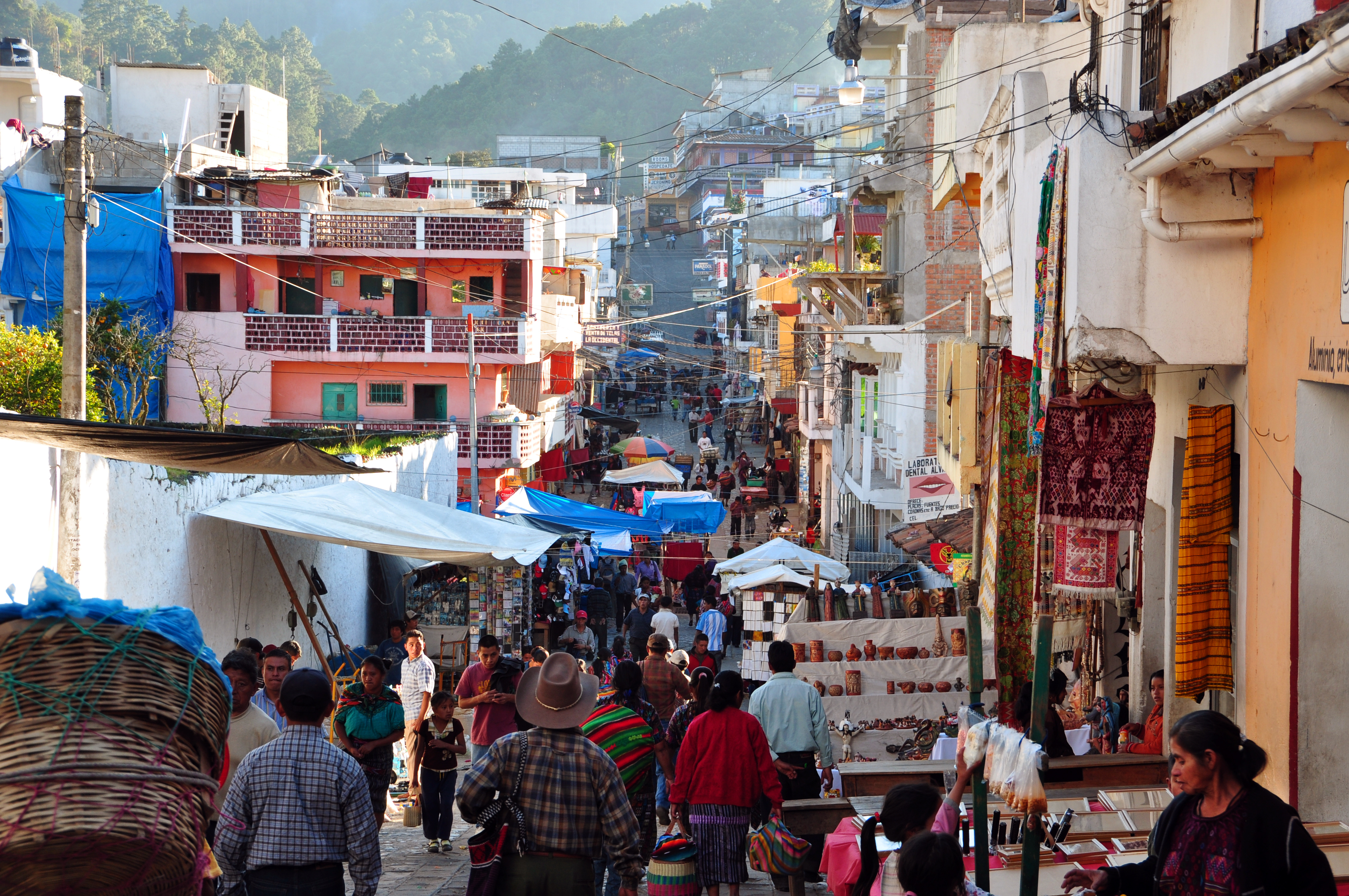
In Guatemala, racers performed the Roadblock at the Chichicastenango Market.

Airdate: September 26, 2010

- Tikal, Guatemala (Templo del Jaguar) (Starting Line)
- Flores (Mundo Maya International Airport) to Guatemala City (La Aurora International Airport)
- Guatemala City to Antigua
- Antigua (Arco de Santa Catalina)
- Antigua (Porta Hotel Antigua) (Overnight Rest)
- Antigua (San José Cathedral)
- Antigua to Chichicastenango
- Chichicastenango (Chichicastenango Market)
- Panajachel (Panajachel Pier to Atitlán Hotel)

This season's first Detour was a choice between A Tus Manos (At Your Hands) or A Tus Pies (At Your Feet). In A Tus Manos, teams had to wash 10 kilograms (22 lb) of dirty clothes to receive their next clue. In A Tus Pies, teams had to make a sawdust carpet to receive their next clue.

In this season's first Roadblock, one team member had to search for a couple dressed in traditional costumes similar to the ones on the provided picture to receive their next clue.

Additional tasks

- At Templo del Jaguar, teams had to search the ruins for earth, water, air and fire glyphs to receive their next clue.
- At Chichicastenango Market, teams had to search the marked stand to receive their next clue.
- At Panajachel Pier, teams had to travel by boat to the Pit Stop.

=== Leg 2 (Guatemala → Mexico) ===
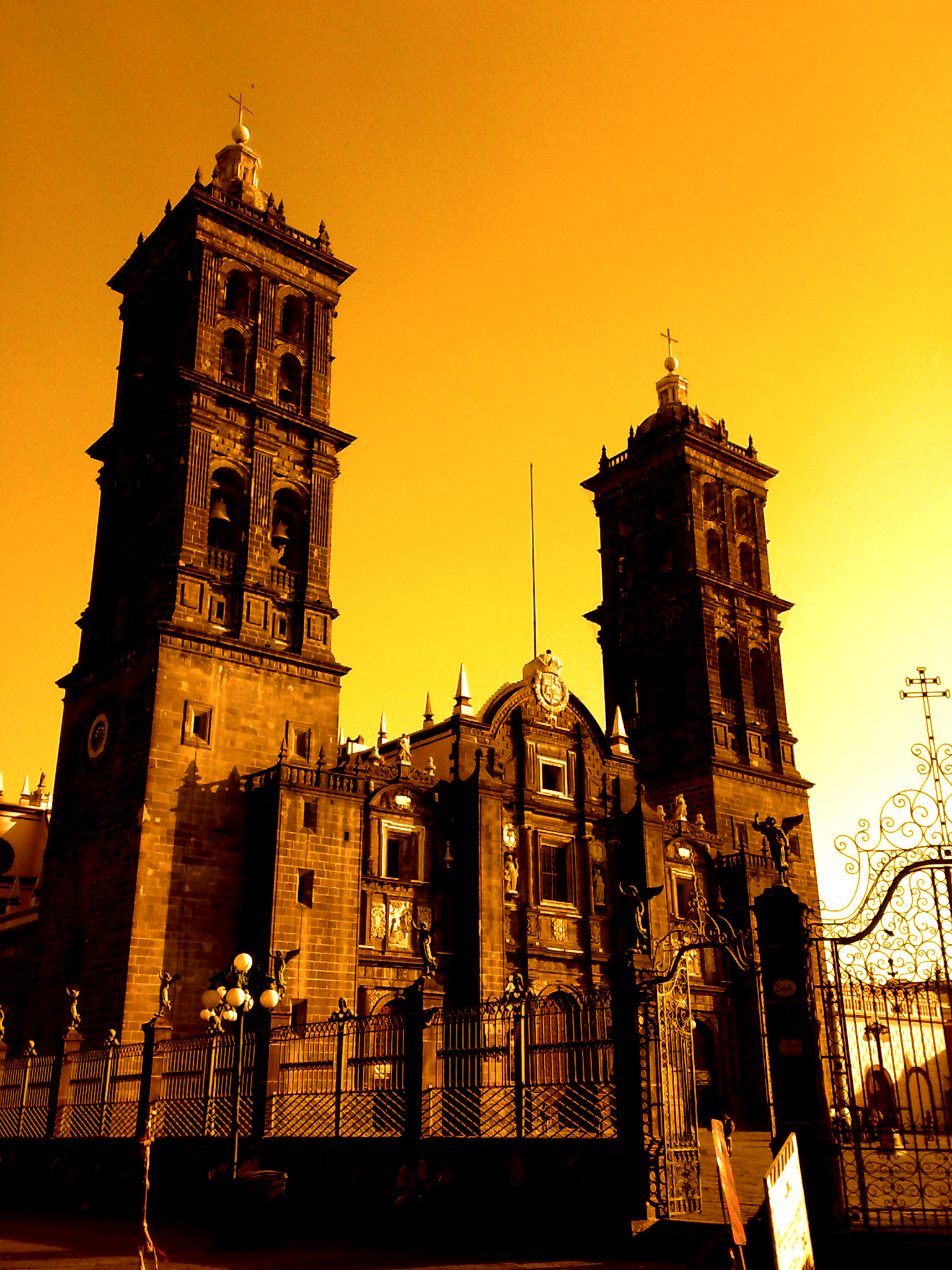
Puebla Cathedral was the last of seven churches in Puebla that the teams had to visit in order to get a clue.

Airdate: October 3, 2010

- Panajachel (Atitlán Nature Reserve – Canopy Course)
- Guatemala City (La Aurora International Airport) to Mexico City, Mexico (Mexico City International Airport)
- Mexico City to Puebla
- Puebla (Fonda Santa Clara)
  - Puebla (Casa de las Artesanias)
- Puebla (Dulcería La Central)
- Puebla (Seven Churches)
- Puebla (Zócalo de Puebla)
- Puebla (Parián Craft Market or Artists' Quarter)
- Puebla (Africam Safari) (Unaired)

For their Speed Bump, Mauricio & Mariana had to make papel picado before they could continue racing.

This leg's Detour was a choice between Platazos or Garrotazos. In Platazos, teams had to reveal the identity of a Mexican hero with the clue "As a child he was nicknamed as a sly and mischievous animal" (Miguel Hidalgo), then teams had to make their way to the Parián craft market, buy Talavera dishes and complete the name of the hero to receive their next clue. In Garrotazos, teams had to reveal the identity of another Mexican hero with the clue "This had a visible scar on the nose" (José María Morelos), then teams had to make their way to the artists quarter and break a Mexican piñata, the teams had to complete the name of the Mexican hero to receive their next clue.

In an unaired Roadblock, one team member had to place their hands in a bowl full of Madagascar hissing cockroaches for one minute before retrieving their next clue from the bowl.

Additional tasks

- At Atitlán Nature Reserve, both team members had to complete a canopy course to receive their next clue.
- At Fonda Santa Clara, teams had to elaborate "mole poblano" using a metate to receive their next clue.
- At Dulcería La Central, teams had to sell traditional sweets known as "Gallitos" in "Senda de la mujer". Once completed, teams had to eat a tray of sweets before receiving their next clue.
- After eating the sweets, teams had to search for seven churches obtaining a seal from a clerical authority. These were the San Jerónimo, Inmaculada Concepción, Santo Domingo, Niño Cieguito, Espíritu Santo, San Cristóbal churches and the Puebla Cathedral. Once completed, teams received their next clue.

=== Leg 3 (Mexico) ===
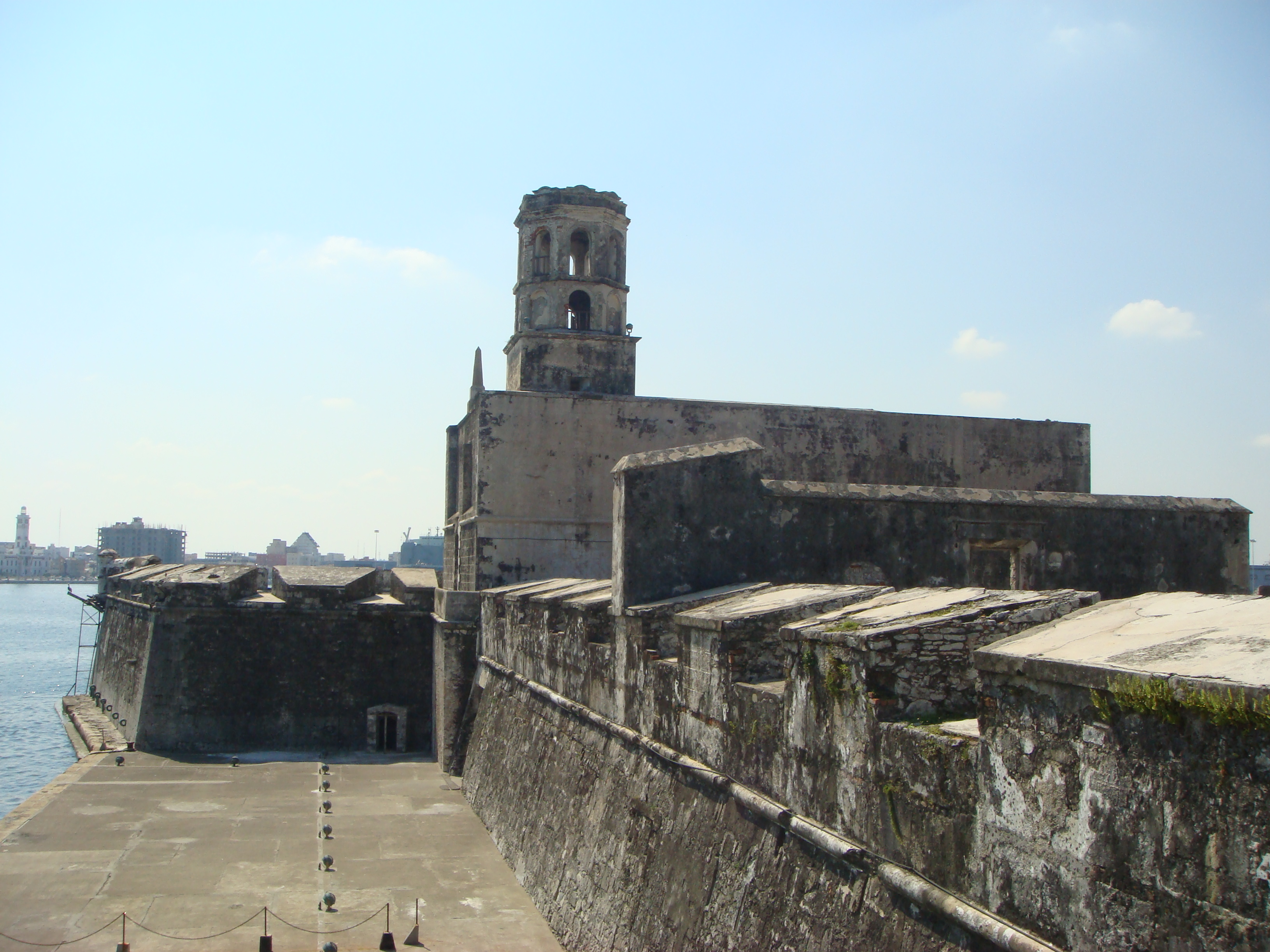
Teams visited San Juan de Ulúa in this leg.

Airdate: October 10, 2010

- Puebla (Puebla Bus Station) to Veracruz (Veracruz Bus Station)
- Veracruz (Gran Café del Portal)
- Veracruz (Container Terminal)
- Boca del Río (Monumento de los Valores Ciudadanos)
- Veracruz (Plazuela de la Campana)
- Veracruz (San Juan de Ulúa)
- Veracruz (Chachalacas Beach)
- Veracruz (Ribera de Río de Playa)
- El Tajín (Pyramid of the Niches)

In this leg's Roadblock, one team member had to purchase a traditional dance costume using a Visa card and then dance with a partner of the square to find the dancer with the same number in their clue to receive their next clue.

This leg's Detour was a choice between Corazón Contento (Happy Heart) or Árido e Intrépido (Arid and Fearless). In Corazón contento, teams have to eat 14 spicy toasted chili peppers to receive their next clue. In Árido e Intrépido, teams had to ride sandboards down beach dunes without falling off to receive their next clue.

Additional tasks

- At the Grand Café del Portal, teams had to serve 33 cups of "coffee milk" using the technique used by the waiters to receive the next clue.
- At the Veracruz Container Terminal, teams had to add the numbers located on containers until they found the result equal to the number listed in their clue.
- At Monumento de los Valores Ciudadanos, teams had to use a puzzle of hollow pyramid fashion to form the four values represented in the monument (love, honor, truth and work), to receive the next clue.
- At San Juan de Ulúa, teams had to climb to the highest point of the fort on their own for the next clue.
- At Chachalacas beach, teams had to drive an ATV before receiving the Detour clue.
- At Ribera de Río de Playa, teams had to collect different species of fish, before heading to the Pit Stop.

=== Leg 4 (Mexico → Colombia) ===
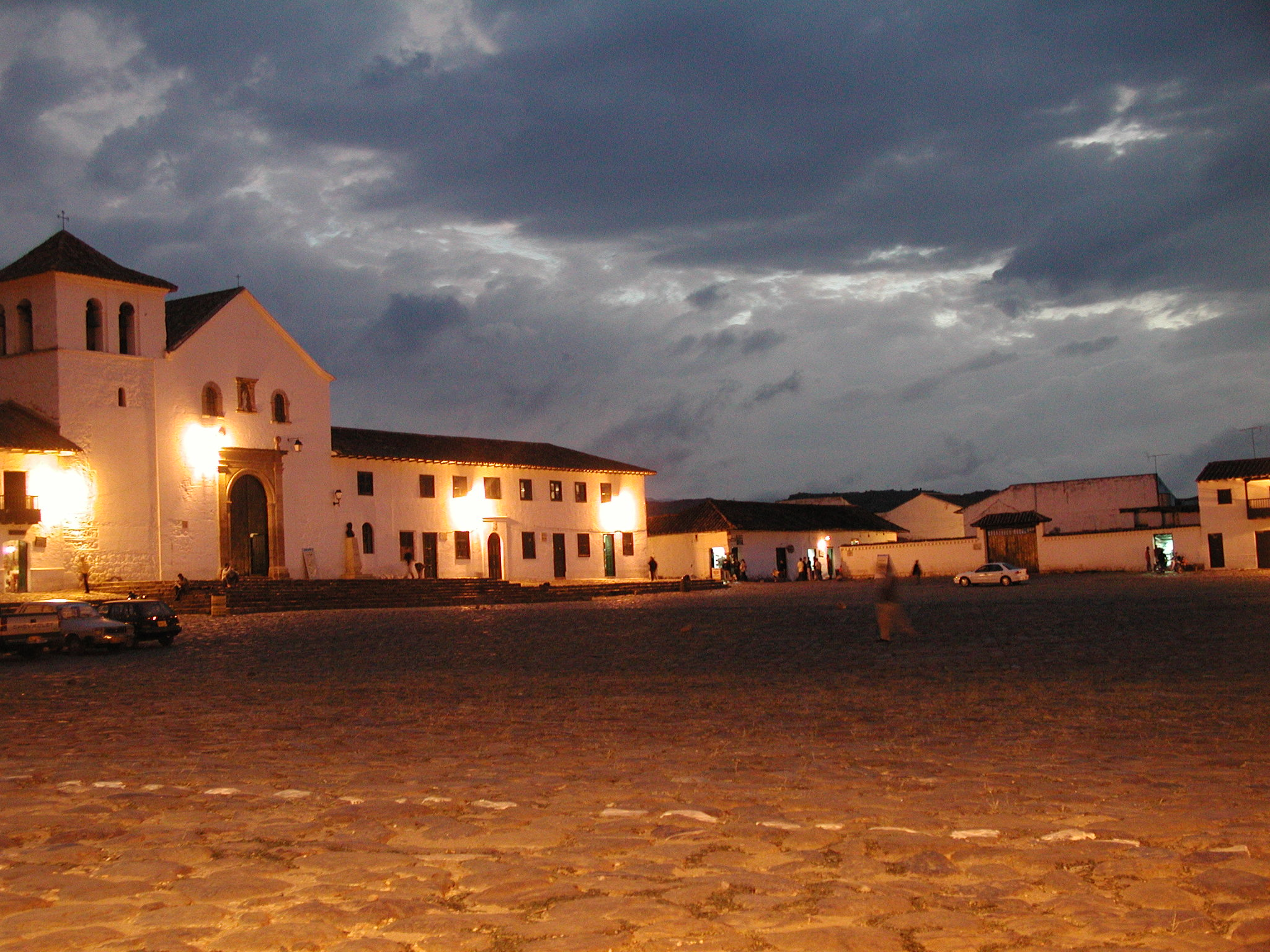
Villa de Leyva's main square was the Pit Stop for this leg.

Airdate: October 17, 2010

- Veracruz (Veracruz International Airport) to Bogotá, Colombia (El Dorado International Airport)
- Bogotá (Almacén Nazaret)
- Bogotá (Monserrate)
- Ráquira (Plaza Principal de Ráquira)
- Ráquira (Fábrica Artesanal "Todo Ráquira")
- Boyacá (Granja de Avestruces vía Santa Sofía)
- Moniquirá (Cancha de Voleibol)
- Villa de Leyva (Plaza Mayor)

In this leg's Roadblock, one team member had to make a clay pot to receive their next clue.

This leg's Detour was a choice between Arrear (Herd) or Buscar (Search). In Arrear, teams had to herd three ostriches from one corral to another without touching or scaring them to receive their next clue. In Buscar, teams had to search for two ostrich eggs painted with the same colour to receive their next clue.

In this season's only Intersection, one team had to play volleyball against another team in a 5-point match. The winning team got their next clue and the losing team had to wait for another couple to arrive to play against them. The final losing team had to wait 15 minutes after the previous winning team left before they were given their next clue.

Additional task

- At Almacén Nazaret, teams had to buy eight candles with their respective ceramic holders and take them to the Basilica of the Lord of Monserrate at the top of Monserrate Hill. Once there, teams had to light the candles in the stairs to receive their next clue.

=== Leg 5 (Colombia) ===
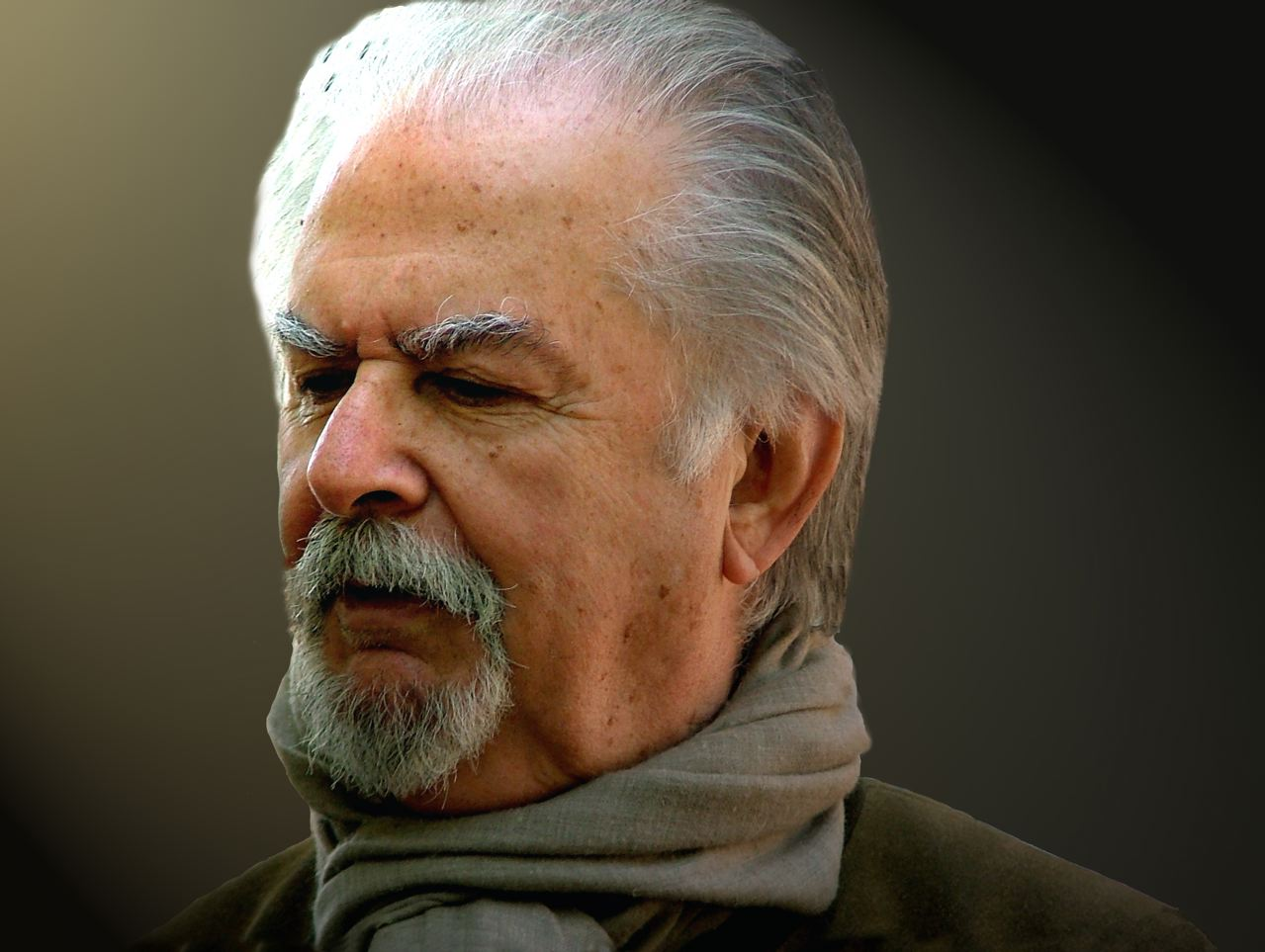
In Medellín, teams had complete a task, where they needed to collect resources related to Fernando Botero (pictured).

Airdate: October 24, 2010

- Bogotá (El Dorado International Airport) to Medellín (Olaya Herrera Airport)
- Medellín (Plaza de los Pies Descalzos)
- Medellín (Plaza de Luz)
- Medellín (Estación San Antonio to Estación Hospital)
- Medellín (Parque de la República and San Pedro Cemetery)
- Medellín (Estación Hospital to Estación Parque Berrío)
- Medellín (Museum of Antioquia)
- Medellín (Biblioteca España)
- Medellín (Parque Explora)
- Medellín (Fábrica Textil C.I El Globo)
- Medellín (Parque de las Banderas)

In this leg's Roadblock, one team member had to attach flower to a chair then walk to San Pedro Cemetery to place it in honor of Carlos Gardel's grave to receive their next clue.

This leg's Detour was a choice between Etiquetar (Label) or Voltear (Flip). In Etiquetar, teams have to label 100 T-shirts with a clue on it. In Voltear, teams had to turn 150 trouser pockets to see their next clue.

Additional tasks

- At the Plaza de Luz, teams had to count the light poles (300). They could help put a colored sticker on each post to receive the next clue.
- In the Museum of Antioquia, teams had to grab the books that are in the room of paintings, drawings and sculptures of Fernando Botero and deliver them to Biblioteca España for the next clue.
- At the Parque Explora, teams have to view a digital animation of a queen angelfish, and identify the species of the same family in the aquarium. Once found, they had to report the number of the tank and the scientific name to a diver to receive the next clue.

=== Leg 6 (Colombia → Venezuela) ===
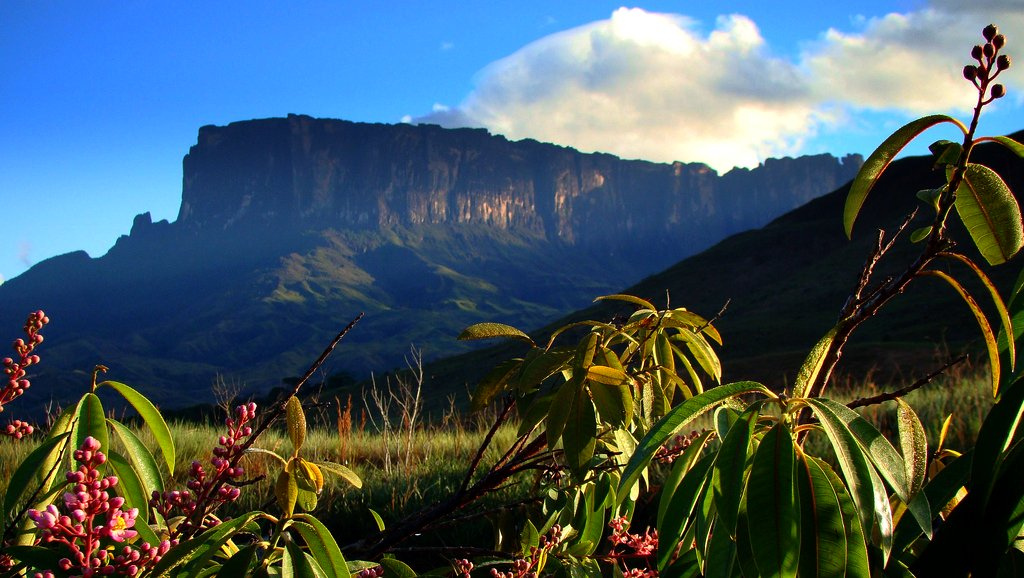
Mayupa in Canaima National Park was the Pit Stop for this leg.

Airdate: October 31, 2010

- Medellín (Complejo Acuático Atanasio Girardot)
- Medellín (José María Córdova International Airport) to Canaima National Park, Bolívar, Venezuela (Canaima Airport)
  - Canaima National Park (Ucaiama Port)
- Canaima National Park (Waku Lodge)
- Canaima National Park (Anatoly Island)
  - Canaima National Park (Salto el Hacha)
- Canaima National Park (Playa del Salto el Sapo (in Spanish))
- Canaima National Park (Waku Lodge to Salto Ucaima Viewpoint)
- Canaima National Park (Ucaiama Port) to Mayupa

This leg's Detour was a choice between Salto (Jumping) or Pataleo (Kicking). In Salto, teams must jump from a springboard that is used in synchronized swimming, while a professional diver supervises the work to receive their next clue. In Pataleo, each team must swim back and forth in relays along the Olympic-size swimming pool, while matching up with a table used for abdominal strengthening to receive their next clue.

For their Speed Bump, Jelkin & Javier had to travel by bus to Ucaima Port, where they had to repair a curiara and then push another curiara into the river before returning to the airport to continue racing.

In this season's only Fast Forward, one team had to go to Salto el Hacha to perform a Pemón ritual, which involved trimming one team member's hair to a short length and donning traditional clothing, to win the Fast Forward award.

In this leg's Roadblock, one team member had to eat bachaco culones (ants) and drink cachiri (fermented cassava) to receive their next clue.

Additional tasks

- At Waku Lodge, teams have to carry five kilograms (11 lb) of cassava to a Wayar community. Then, they had to walk across a narrow corduroy road with their cassava. Once across, they had to grate the cassava. Once approved, teams would receive their next clue and could climb onto a motorized curiara bound for Anatoly Island.
- On Anatoly Island, each team member had to shoot a papaya with three darts from a blowgun to receive their next clue.
- After completing the blowdart challenge, teams had to make their way on foot to Playa del Salto el Sapo. Once there, teams had to paddle a curiara across the Carrao River to a nearby shore to obtain their clue. After receiving their clue, teams then to paddle to back to Anatoly Island, board a motorized curiara that would take them to Waku Lodge, and then board a bus to the Salto Ucaima viewpoint to get their next clue.
- After the Roadblock, teams had to make their way on foot to Ucaima Port and board a motorized curiara that would take them to the Pit Stop.

=== Leg 7 (Venezuela → Brazil) ===
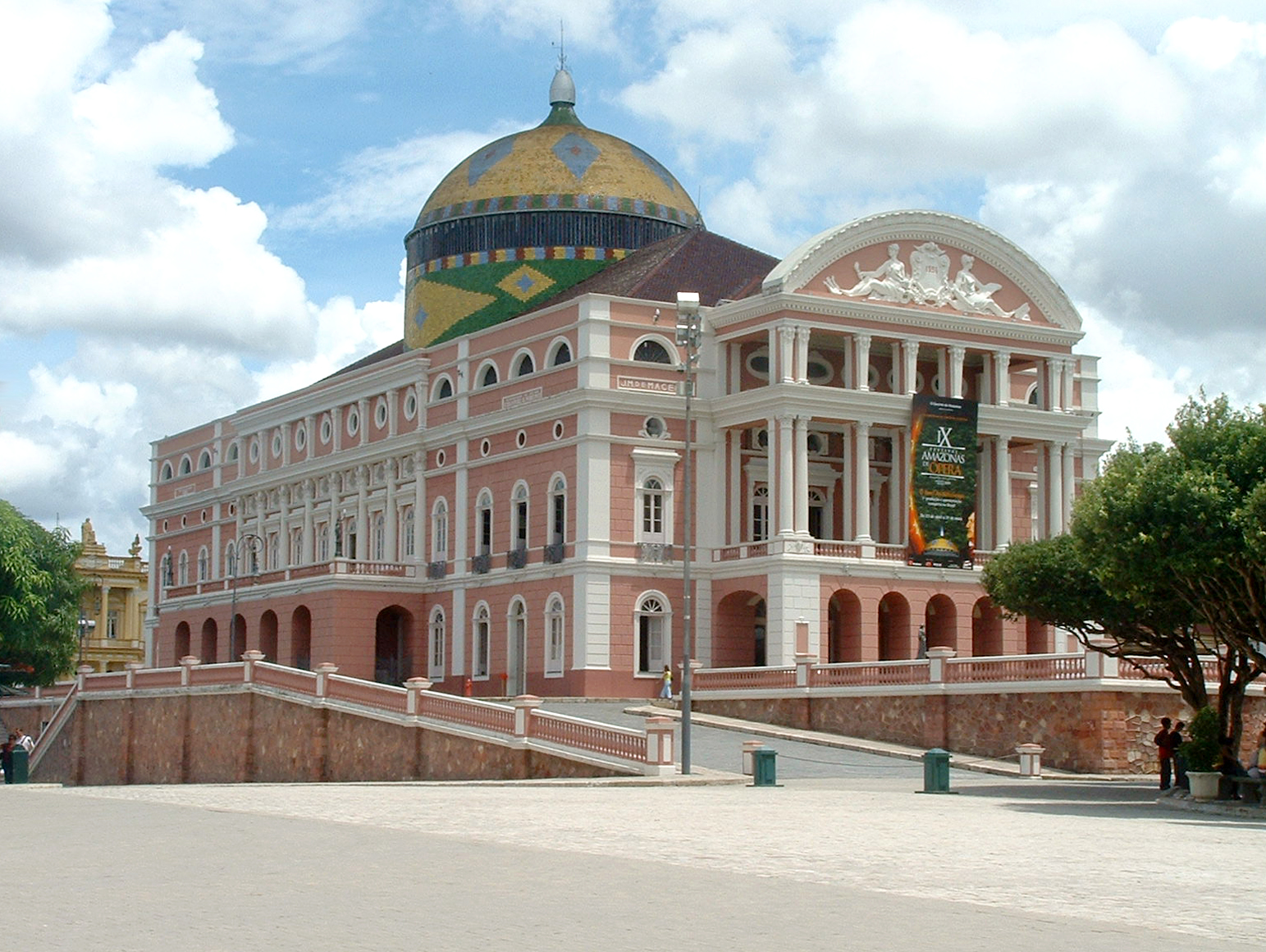
While in Manaus, teams visited the Amazon Theatre to get a clue.

Airdate: November 7, 2010

- Canaima National Park (Canaima Airport) to Manaus, Amazonas, Brazil (Eduardo Gomes International Airport)
- Manaus (Feria Libre)
- Manaus (Teatro Amazonas)
- Manaus (Parque Municipal do Mindu (in Portuguese))
- Manaus (Centro de Instrucción de Guerra de la Selva (in Portuguese))
- Manaus (Manaus Bridge)
- Manaus (Hotel Tropical Manaus Pier (in Portuguese))

In this leg's Roadblock, one team member had to move five watermelons from the wharf to store number seven to receive their next clue.

This leg's Detour was a choice between Entrenarse (Train) or Ubicarse (Located). In Entrenarse, teams had to go through a military training course consisting of net climbing, rope climbing, and a rappelling wall to receive their next clue. In Ubicarse, teams had to use a compass to find specific coordinates of three flags in the jungle, which they would exchange for their next clue.

Additional tasks

- At the Teatro Amazonas, teams had to take a number and then enter the theater to identify which of The Four Seasons by Antonio Vivaldi was being played to receive their next clue. Should they make a mistake, they would have to go to the back of the line and wait to reenter, when a different piece of The Four Seasons would play.
- At the Parque Municipal do Mindu, teams had to plant five trees in the park following the advice of an environmentalist to get their next clue.
- At the Manaus Bridge, teams had to calculate how much concrete is needed to finish building the bridge for the next clue.

=== Leg 8 (Brazil) ===
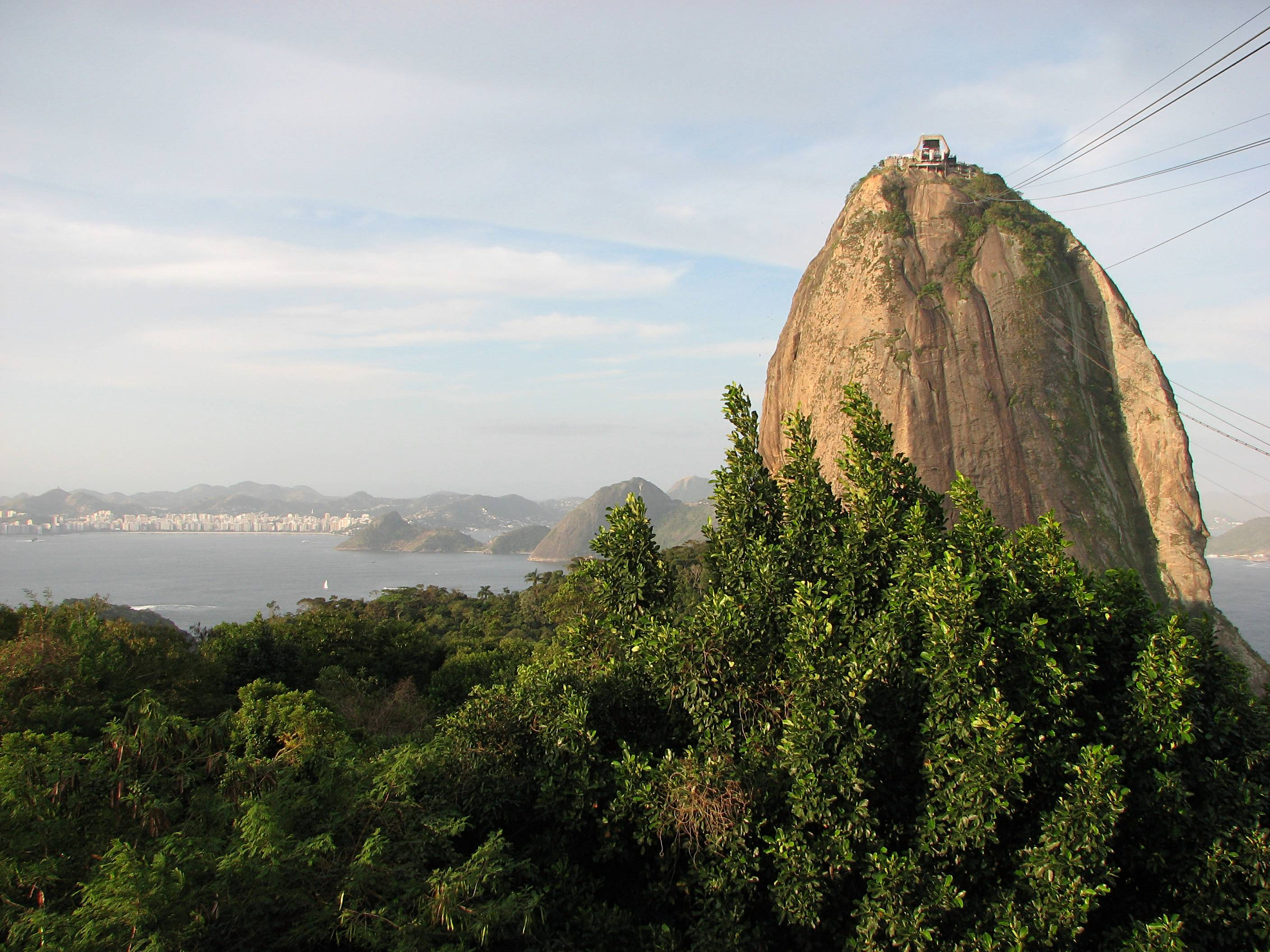
On top of Sugarloaf Mountain, teams used binoculars to look for a GO Visa emblem to find their next clue.

Airdate: November 14, 2010

- Manaus (Eduardo Gomes International Airport) to Rio de Janeiro (Rio de Janeiro/Galeão International Airport)
- Rio de Janeiro (Hotel Copacabana Sol) (Overnight Rest)
  - Rio de Janeiro (Porcão Restaurant)
- Rio de Janeiro (Sugarloaf Mountain)
- Rio de Janeiro (Iate Clube do Rio de Janeiro (in Portuguese))
- Rio de Janeiro (Pedra Bonita (in Portuguese) and São Conrado Beach)
- Rio de Janeiro (Copacabana – Copacabana Palace)
- Rio de Janeiro (Santa Teresa – Taller de Getulio)
- Rio de Janeiro (Cidade do Samba)
- Niterói (Niterói Contemporary Art Museum)

For their Speed Bump, Aleandra & Marlene had to wash, dry and stack many dishes in the Porcão Restaurant before they could continue racing.

In this leg's Roadblock, one team member had to paraglide with an instructor from Pedra Bonita to São Conrado Beach, where they get their next clue from the otherside of the place.

This leg's Detour was a choice between Con Ritmo (With Rhythm) or Tocado (Headdress). In Con Ritmo, teams had to learn how to play a song on a traditional samba drum and play for five minutes without error for the next clue. In Tocado, teams had to create a costume which used for the carnival.

Additional tasks

- Once atop Sugarloaf Mountain, teams needed to use binoculars to search for a GO Visa logo on a sailboat. They then had to row a boat from Iate Clube do Rio de Janeiro to the boat to get their next clue.
- At Copacabana Palace, teams had to put on cleaners' outfits and pick a section of beach to clean. They would have to pick up some bottles and plastic lids and need to hold the item to the next location, Taller de Getulio.
- At Taller de Getulio, teams had to make a stool out of the bottles and lids they collected at Copacabana Palace.

=== Leg 9 (Brazil → Argentina) ===
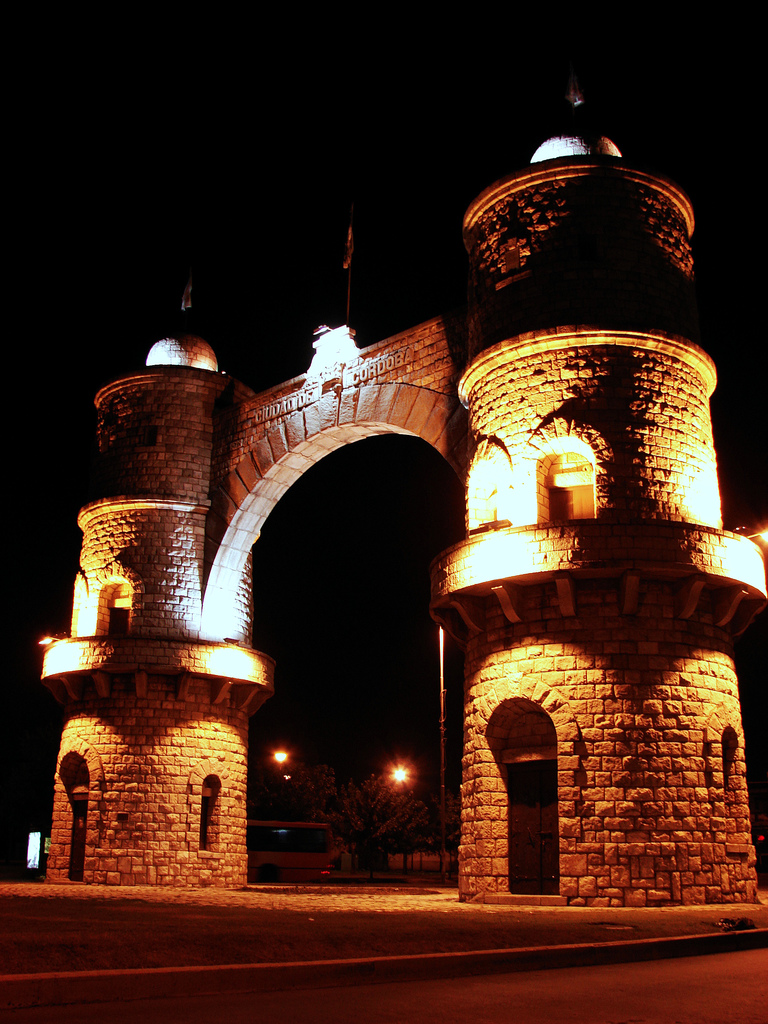
Teams visited the Arco de Córdoba during this leg.

Airdate: November 21, 2010

- Rio de Janeiro (Santos Dumont Airport) to Córdoba, Argentina (Ingeniero Ambrosio L.V. Taravella International Airport)
- Córdoba (Barranca Yaco)
- Villa Tulumba (Plaza Central)
- San Pedro (Posta de San Pedro)
- San Pedro (Farmlands)
- Córdoba (Arco de Córdoba (in Spanish))
- Córdoba (Córdoba Cabildo)

In this leg's Roadblock, one team member had to ride a horse and guide it around barrels. Finally, they would have to spear a suspended ring to complete the task.

This leg's Detour was a choice between Enjabonado (Soaping) or Pesar (Weight). In Enjabonado, teams had to chase a pig that's covered with soap and hold onto it for five seconds. In Pesar, teams had to hitch a cow to a lift and then weigh it. If they came up with the correct weight, they would receive their next clue.

Additional tasks

- In Villa Tulumba, teams had to look at the various posters, monuments and signs and determine which name appeared most often. If correct, they would receive their next clue.
- At the Posta de San Pedro, teams had to dress up as historic mail carriers, memorize a message, and orally repeat it to General Manuel Belgrano.

=== Leg 10 (Argentina) ===
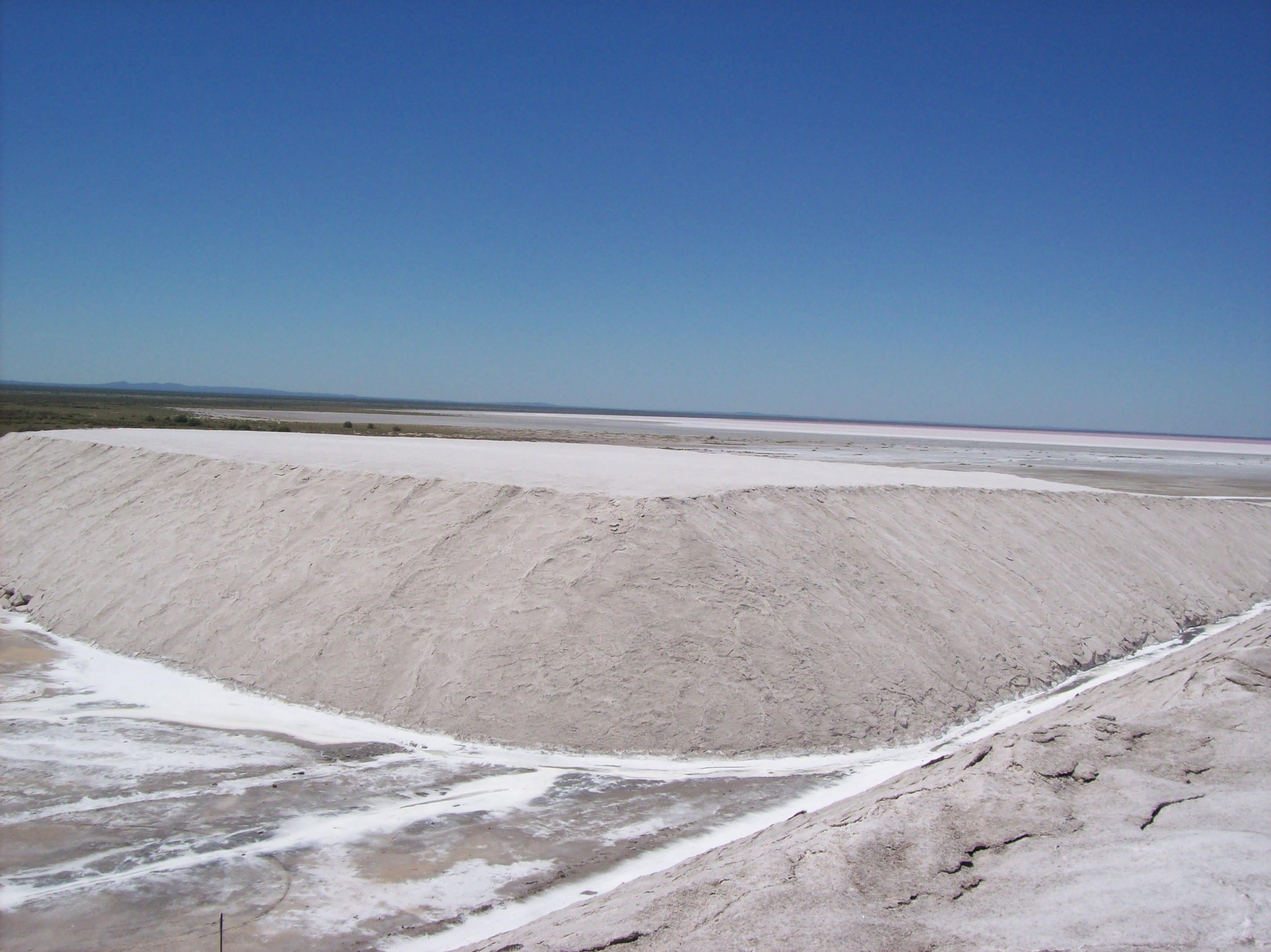
Teams had to fill eight sacks with salt in Salinas del Bebedero.

Airdate: November 28, 2010

- Merlo (Mirador de Los Cóndores)
- Merlo (Establecimiento Merlín)
- Juana Koslay (Pasaje Miguel Roca)
- Potrero de los Funes (Potrero de los Funes Circuit)
- San Luis (Hotel American de San Luis) (Overnight Rest)
- Salinas del Bebedero (Salt Flat)
- San Luis (Edificio de la Gobernación de San Luis (in Spanish))

This leg's Detour was a choice between Esquivar (Dodge) or Bloques (Blocks). In Esquivar, teams had to get their next clue while avoiding being hit by paintball snipers. If teams were hit, they had to start again. In Bloques, teams had to figure out how to transport six concrete blocks at once using a stick, a rope and a piece of wire.

In this leg's Roadblock, one team member had to drive around the track within 3 minutes 45 second to receive the next clue.

Additional tasks

- At Mirador de Los Cóndores, teams had to abseil across three hanging bridges.
- At Establecimiento Merlín, teams had to fill four jars with olives using only their mouths to get the next clue.
- At the Salt Flat, teams had to fill eight sacks with salt and sew them closed. They would only receive their next clue if their bags weighed over 150 kg.

=== Leg 11 (Argentina → Bolivia) ===
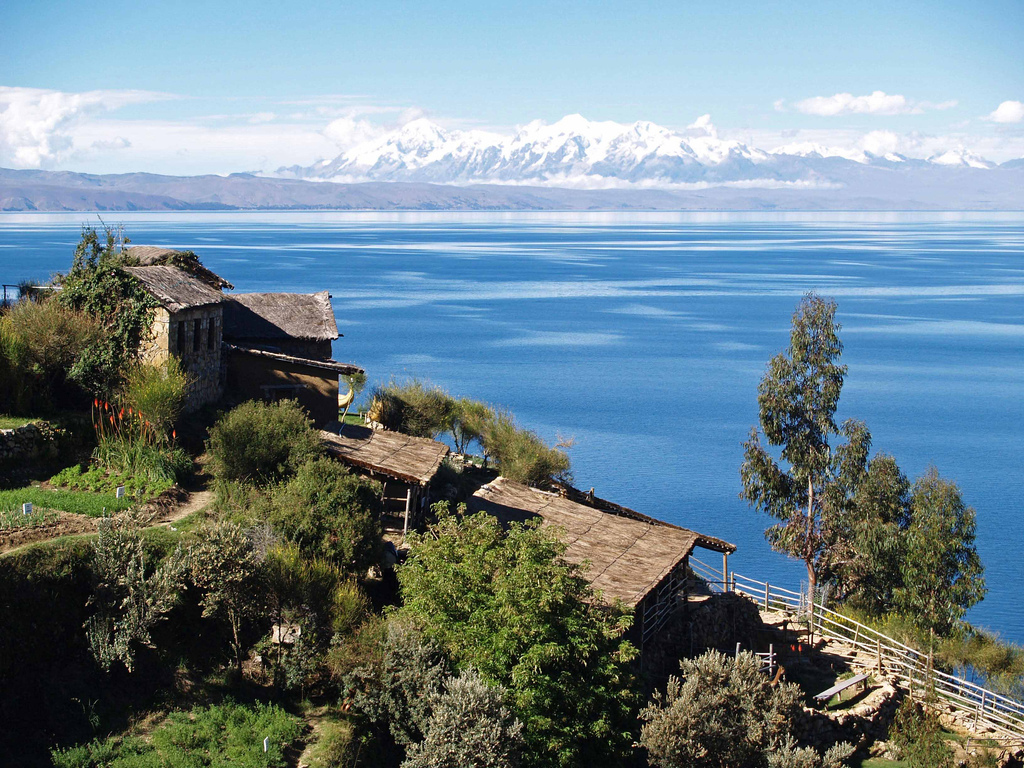
Lake Titicaca was the location for this leg's Roadblock.

Airdate: December 5, 2010

- Córdoba (Ingeniero Ambrosio L.V. Taravella International Airport) to La Paz, Bolivia (El Alto International Airport)
- La Paz (Plaza Murillo)
- La Paz (Street of Witches or Museum of Musical Instruments)
- La Paz (Mirador Killi Killi (in Spanish))
- Lake Titicaca (Isla de los Uros Iruitos (in Spanish))
- Copacabana (Plaza Principal)
- Copacabana (Rebaño de Llamas)
- Copacabana (Plaza de Toros)
- Copacabana (Cerro el Calvario (in Spanish))

This leg's Detour was a choice between Quemar (Burn) or Armar (Arm). In Quemar, teams visited the Street of Witches, and needed to purchase the items required for a shaman to build a "Good Journey Table". In Armar, teams travelled to the Museum of Musical Instruments and had to make two panpies.

In this leg's Roadblock, one team member had to ride a traditional raft and collect reeds. Once they collected enough, they would receive their next clue.

Additional tasks

- At Plaza Murillo, teams needed to find the origins of a famous phrase. Teams needed to figure out that it was Pedro Domingo Murillo famous speech that he made before he was hanged.
- At Plaza principal in Copacabana, teams needed to decorate a car with the provided materials. It would then be blessed and teams would receive their next clue.
- Teams needed to guide eight llamas from Rebaño de llamas to Plaza de Toros.

=== Leg 12 (Bolivia → Ecuador) ===
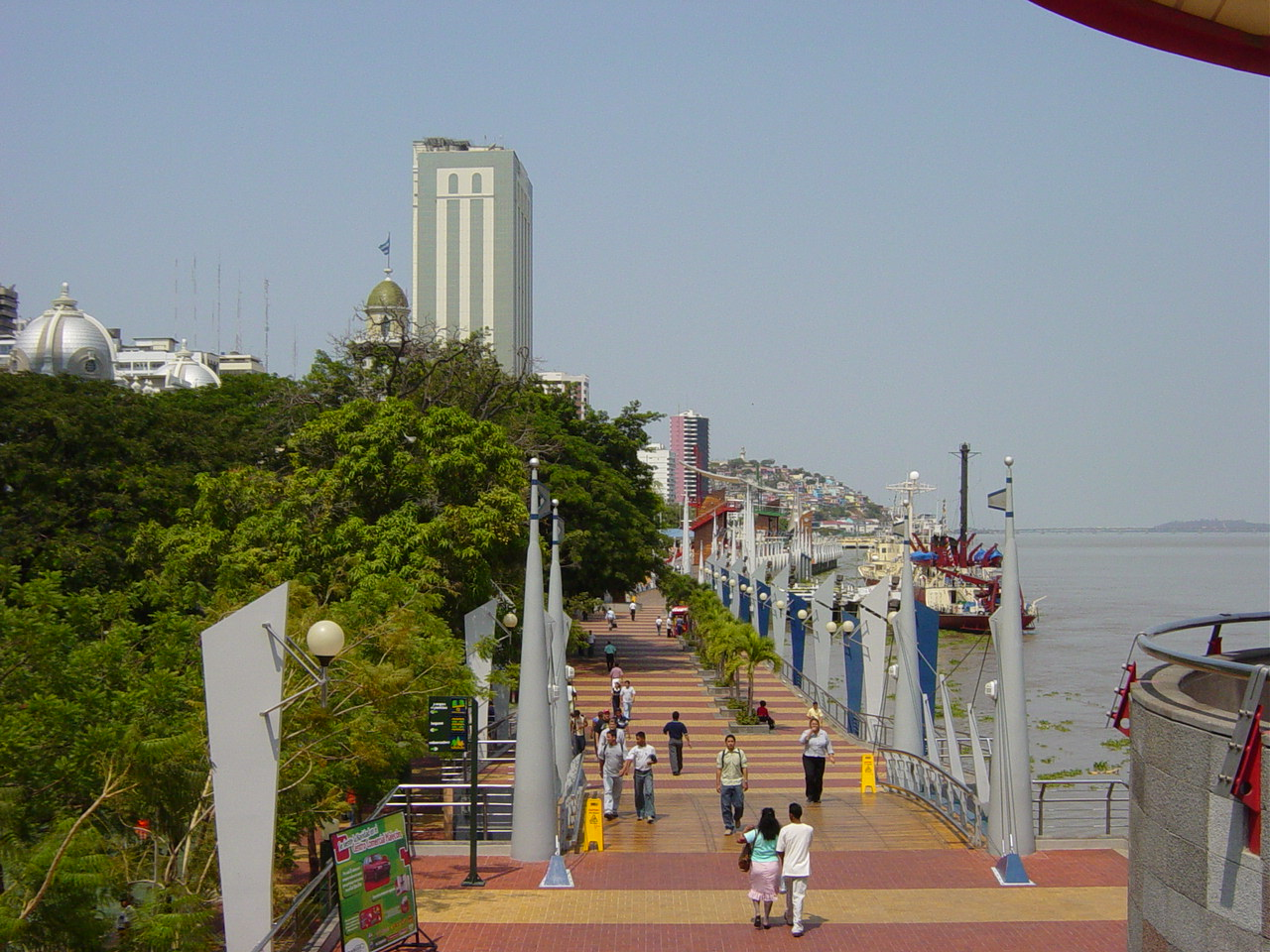
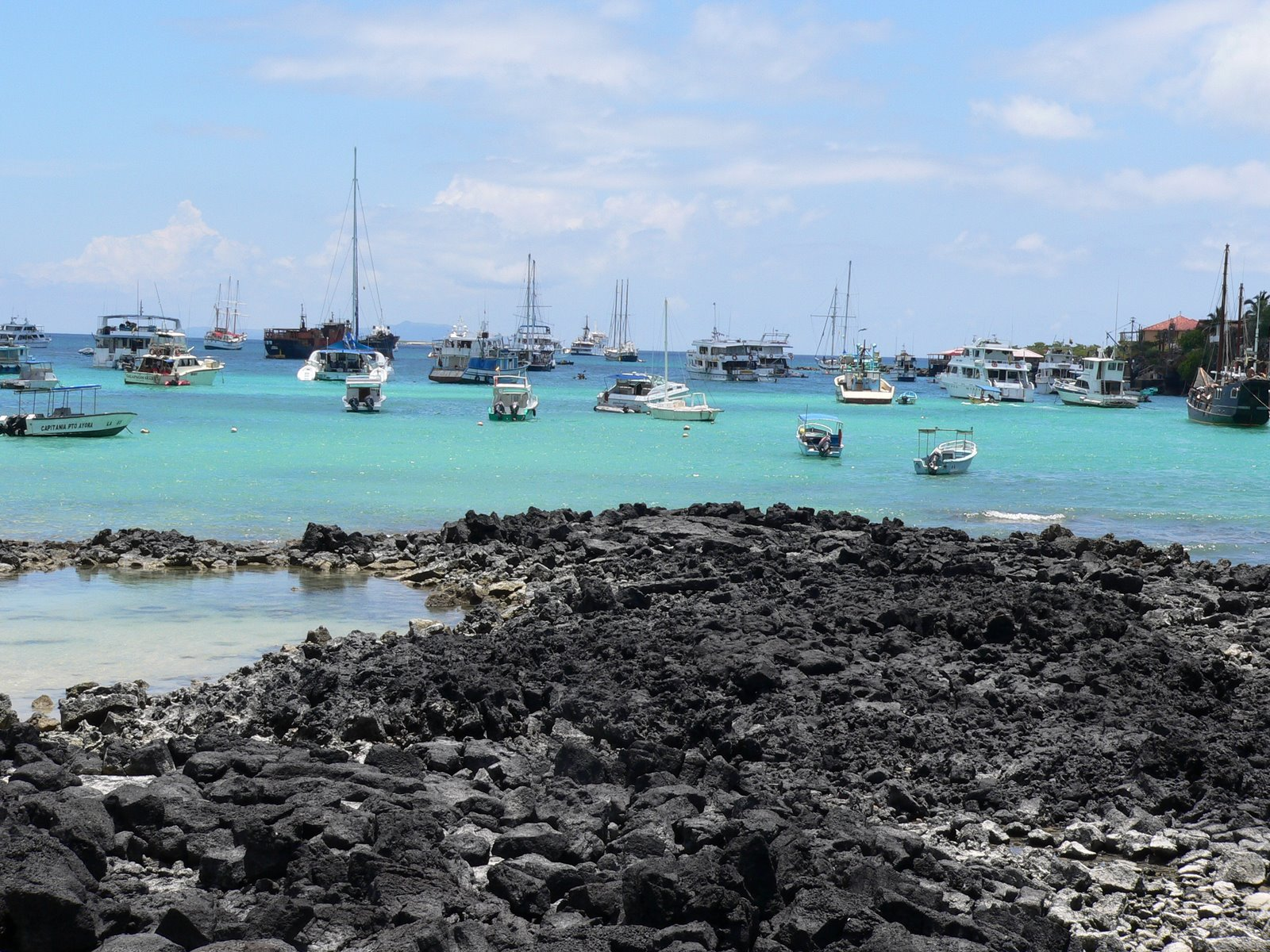
The double length leg in Ecuador, where teams visited Plaza Olmedo in Guayaquil for the midpoint, and at Puerto Ayora in the Galápagos Islands for the final Roadblock.

Airdates: December 12 and 19, 2010

- La Paz (El Alto International Airport) to Guayaquil, Ecuador (José Joaquín de Olmedo International Airport)
- Guayaquil (Monument of Simón Bolívar and José de San Martín (in Spanish))
- Guayaquil (Las Peñas (in Spanish))
- Guayaquil (Centro Comercial Aventura – Iguana Sculpture)
- Guayaquil (Parque Seminario (in Spanish))
- Guayaquil (Calle Colon – El Pollo Marino Restaurant)
- Guayaquil (Empacadora PACFISH S.A.)
- Guayaquil (Plaza Olmedo)
- Guayaquil (Malecón 2000 – La Planchada)
- Guayaquil (José Joaquín de Olmedo International Airport) to Baltra Island, Galápagos Islands (Seymour Airport)
- Baltra Island (Port of Baltra Island) to Santa Cruz Island (Port of Santa Cruz Island)
- Santa Cruz Island (Cráteres Los Gemelos)
- Santa Cruz Island (Garrapatero Beach)
- Santa Cruz Island (Centro de Crianza de Tortugas Fausto Llerena)
- Puerto Ayora, Santa Cruz Island to Academy Bay (Mandalay [Replica of HMS Beagle])
- Academy Bay to Santa Cruz Island (Tortuga Bay)

This season's final Detour was a choice between Restaurar (Restore) or Encontrar (Find). In Restaurar, teams had to paint a section of Barrio Las Peñas. In Encontrar, teams had to search the many names on the Monument to the Donars to find a specific name.

In this leg's first Roadblock, teams had to eat 1.5 kg (3.3 lb) of "Horse" (A type of sausage) to get the next clue.

In this season's final Roadblock, one team member, regardless of who performed the first Roadblock, had to search within HMS Beagle to find three passages from the Charles Darwin book The Origin of Species to receive the final clue.

Additional tasks

- At the Monument of Simón Bolívar and José de San Martín, teams had to walk down Simón Bolívar Avenue to Barrio Las Penas. They then had to climb to the top of the lighthouse. At the top, a sailor would ask them how many steps there were. If teams came up with the correct answer of 500, they would receive their next clue.
- At Parque Seminario, teams had to guide ten iguanas to a designated area with fruit and leaves.
- At Empacadora PACFISH S.A., teams had to strip, clean, and weigh two 5-pound (2.3 kg) packages of shrimp.
- At La Planchada, teams had to place 12 flags onto a map representing the 12 locations they previously visited in the previous legs. Once the order was correct, they will receive the next clue.
- At Garrapatero Beach, one team member had to use flags to spell out the name of an island, which the other team member had to interpret and spell.
- At Centro de Crianza de Tortugas Fausto Llerena, teams were given five minutes to observe the giant tortoises. They would then be asked questions about the tortoises. If they answered them all correctly, they would receive their next clue.
- At Puerto Ayora, teams had to load supplies onto a boat to receive the next clue.
