= 4th federal electoral district of Veracruz =

Federal electoral district of Mexico

Veracruz's 4th
- Electoral district of the Chamber of Deputies of Mexico

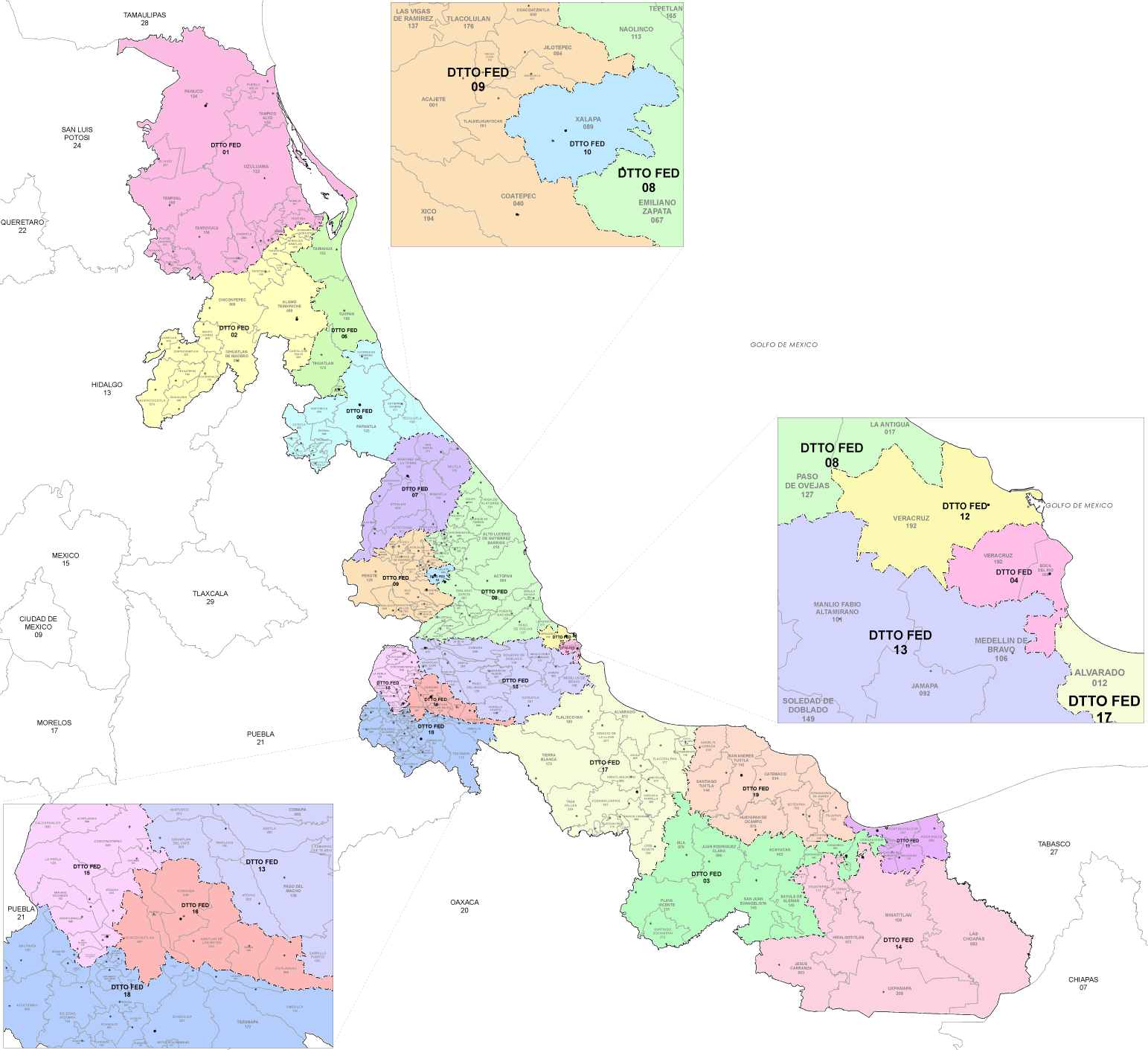
- 4th district since 2023

Incumbent
- Member: María Josefina Gamboa Torales
- Party: ▌National Action Party
- Congress: 66th (2024–2027)

District
- State: Veracruz
- Head town: Boca del Río
- Coordinates: 19°06′N 96°06′W
- Covers: Boca del Río and Veracruz (part)
- PR region: Third
- Precincts: 236
- Population: 376,084 (2020 census)

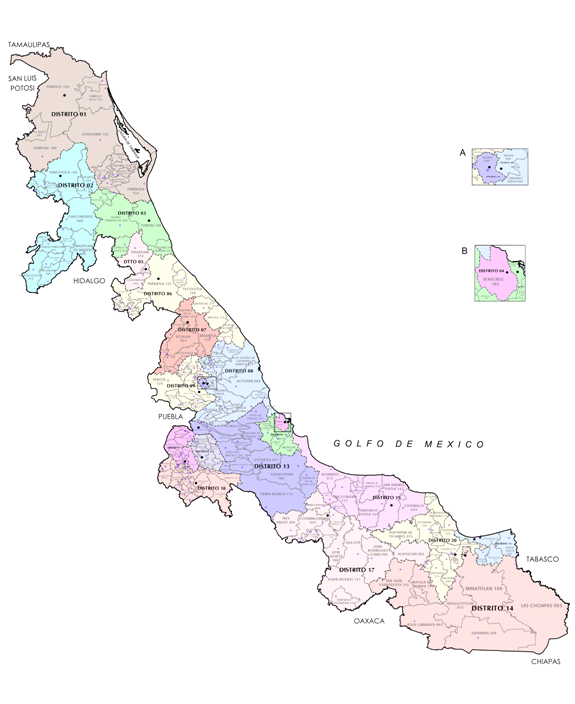
Veracruz under the 2017–2022 districting plan

The 4th federal electoral district of Veracruz (Spanish: Distrito electoral federal 04 de Veracruz) is one of the 300 electoral districts into which Mexico is divided for elections to the federal Chamber of Deputies and one of 19 such districts in the state of Veracruz.

It elects one deputy to the lower house of Congress for each three-year legislative session by means of the first-past-the-post system. Votes cast in the district also count towards the calculation of proportional representation ("plurinominal") deputies elected from the third region.

The current member for the district, elected in the 2024 general election, is María Josefina Gamboa Torales of the National Action Party (PAN).

== District territory ==
Veracruz lost a congressional district in the 2023 districting plan adopted by the National Electoral Institute (INE), which is to be used for the 2024, 2027 and 2030 elections. The reconfigured 4th district covers 236 electoral precincts (secciones electorales) across a portion of the municipality of Veracruz south of the central urban area of the city of Veracruz and the whole of the adjacent municipality of Boca del Río in the state's Sotavento region.

The head town (cabecera distrital), where results from individual polling stations are gathered together and tallied, is the city of Boca del Río. The district reported a population of 376,084 in the 2020 census.

== Previous districting schemes ==
Evolution of electoral district numbers
	1974	1978	1996	2005	2017	2023
Veracruz	15	23	23	21	20	19
Chamber of Deputies	196	300				

Because of shifting demographics, Veracruz currently has four fewer districts than the 23 the state was allocated under the 1977 electoral reforms.

2017–2022

Between 2017 and 2022, Veracruz was assigned 20 electoral districts. The 4th district was limited to a part of the municipality of Veracruz. The head town was the city of Veracruz.

2005–2017

Veracruz's allocation of congressional seats fell to 21 in the 2005 redistricting process. Between 2005 and 2017 the district had its head town at Veracruz and it covered Boca del Río and the south-eastern portion of the municipality of Veracruz.

1996–2005

Under the 1996 districting plan, which allocated Veracruz 23 districts, the head town was at Álamo in the north of the state and the district covered nine municipalities.

1978–1996

The districting scheme in force from 1978 to 1996 was the result of the 1977 electoral reforms, which increased the number of single-member seats in the Chamber of Deputies from 196 to 300. Under that plan, Veracruz's seat allocation rose from 15 to 23. The 4th district had its head town at Papantla and it covered the municipalities of Coahuitlán, Coxquihui, Coyutla, Chumatlán, Espinal, Filomena Mata, Gutiérrez Zamora, Mecatlán, Papantla and Zozocolco.

== Deputies returned to Congress ==
(Mexico) National parties
- Current
- PAN
- PRI
- PT
- PVEM
- MC
- Morena
- PAZ
- Somos
- Defunct or local only
- PLM
- PNR
- PRM
- PNM
- PP
- PPS
- PARM
- PFCRN
- CON
- PANAL
- PSD
- PES
- PES
- PRD

Veracruz's 4th district
Election	Deputy	Party	Term	Legislature
1916	Benito Ramírez		1916–1917	Constituent Congress of Querétaro
...
1973	Patricio Chirinos Calero	Institutional Revolutionary Party	1973–1976	49th Congress
1976	Manuel Gutiérrez Zamora Zamudio	Institutional Revolutionary Party	1976–1979	50th Congress
1979	Gonzalo Anaya Jiménez	Institutional Revolutionary Party	1979–1982	51st Congress
1982	Edmundo Martínez Zaleta	Institutional Revolutionary Party	1982–1985	52nd Congress
1985	Guadalupe Solares Bauza	Institutional Revolutionary Party	1985–1988	53rd Congress
1988	Edmundo Martínez Zaleta	Institutional Revolutionary Party	1988–1991	54th Congress
1991	Arturo Nájera Fuentes	Institutional Revolutionary Party	1991–1994	55th Congress
1994	Filemón Ramírez Pérez	Institutional Revolutionary Party	1994–1997	56th Congress
1997	Everardo Paiz Morales	Institutional Revolutionary Party	1997–2000	57th Congress
2000	Francisco Ríos Alarcón	Institutional Revolutionary Party	2000–2003	58th Congress
2003	Juan Bustillos Montalvo	Institutional Revolutionary Party	2003–2006	59th Congress
2006	Ángel Deschamps Falcón (Note: Deschamps Falcón resigned his seat 11 December 2008.); Mercedes Morales Utrera	National Action Party (Mexico)	2006–2008; 2008–2009	60th Congress
2009	Salvador Manzur Díaz (Note: Manzur Díaz resigned his seat on 23 March 2010 in order to contend (successfully) for the municipal presidency of Boca del Río, Veracruz.); Adela Robles Morales	Institutional Revolutionary Party	2009–2010; 2010–2012	61st Congress
2012	Humberto Alonso Morelli	National Action Party (Mexico)	2012–2015	62nd Congress
2015	Francisco José Gutiérrez	National Action Party (Mexico)	2015–2018	63rd Congress
2018	Ricardo Francisco Exsome Zapata	National Regeneration Movement	2018–2021	64th Congress
2021	Rosa Hernández Espejo	National Regeneration Movement	2021–2024	65th Congress
2024	María Josefina Gamboa Torales	National Action Party (Mexico)	2024–2027	66th Congress

== Presidential elections ==
Veracruz's 4th district
Election	District won by	Party or coalition	%
2018	Andrés Manuel López Obrador	Juntos Haremos Historia	49.8075
2024	Claudia Sheinbaum Pardo	Sigamos Haciendo Historia	48.5534
