= Salvador Manzur Díaz =

Mexican politician

- Born: 5 April 1976 (age 50); Veracruz, Veracruz, Mexico
- Occupation: Politician
- Political party: PRI

Salvador Manzur Díaz (born 5 April 1976) is a Mexican politician from the Institutional Revolutionary Party (PRI). In the 2009 mid-terms he was elected to the Chamber of Deputies to represent the fourth district of Veracruz during the 61st Congress, but he ceded his seat to his substitute, Adela Robles Morales, on 23 March 2010, in order to contend (successfully) for the municipal presidency of Boca del Río, Veracruz.
