= Ángel Deschamps Falcón =

Mexican politician

- Born: 26 September 1955 (age 70); Veracruz, Mexico
- Occupation: Politician
- Political party: PAN

Ángel Rafael Deschamps Falcón (born 26 September 1955) is a Mexican politician from the National Action Party (PAN). In the 2006 general election he was elected to the Chamber of Deputies to represent the fourth district of Veracruz during the 60th Congress, but on 11 December 2008 he ceded his seat to his substitute, Mercedes Morales Utrera.

He had previously served as municipal president of Boca del Río, Veracruz, in 1998 to 2000.
