= Humberto Alonso Morelli =

Mexican politician

- Born: 26 November 1971 (age 54); Veracruz, Veracruz, Mexico
- Occupation: Deputy
- Political party: PAN

Humberto Alonso Morelli (born 26 November 1971) is a Mexican politician affiliated with the National Action Party (PAN). In the 2012 general election he was elected to the Chamber of Deputies to represent the fourth district of Veracruz during the 62nd Congress.

He later served as the municipal president of Boca del Río, Veracruz, from 2018 to 2021.
