= ARM Guanajuato (C-07) =

Former Mexican Navy gunboat

Coordinates: 19.10045°N 96.10423°W

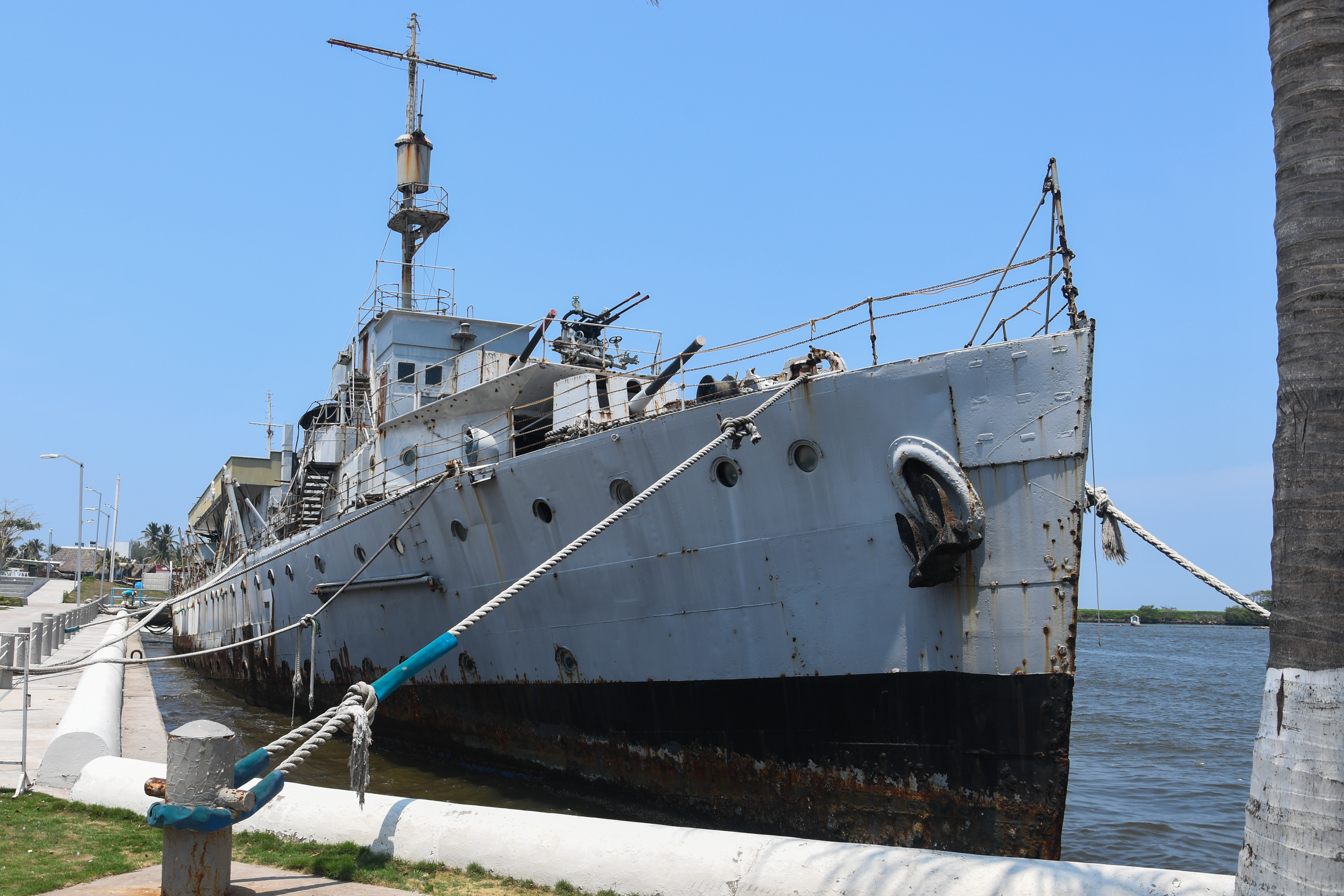
- Cañonero Guanajuato in Boca del Río, 2021

History

Mexico
- Name: Guanajuato
- Builder: Sociedad Española de Construcción Naval del Ferrol
- Laid down: May 1934
- Launched: 1936
- Out of service: 2001
- Fate: Museum in Boca del Río from 2007, scrapped in 2023
- Notes: The museum was named Museo Naval Interactivo Cañonero Guanajuato C-07

General characteristics
- Type: Gunboat
- Displacement: 1,300 t (1,300 long tons)
- Length: 80.5 m (264 ft 1 in)
- Beam: 11.5 m (37 ft 9 in)
- Draft: 4 m (13 ft 1 in)
- Speed: 14 knots (26 km/h; 16 mph)
- Armament: 3 × 101.6 mm Vickers artillery guns; 6 × 20 mm Oerlikon machine guns

ARM Guanajuato (C-07), also known as Cañonero Guanajuato, was a gunboat that served for the Mexican Navy until 2001. It has been located at the shore of the Jamapa River, in the municipality of Boca del Río, Veracruz, as a museum ship.

== History ==
The ship was commissioned by the Mexican government between 1931 and 1933 from the Spanish shipyard Sociedad Española de Construcción Naval del Ferrol (also known as Astillero El Ferrol), along with the transport ship Durango, gunboats Querétaro and Potosí and ten coastguards. The Guanajuato was laid down in May 1934 and delivered into service in 1936. Although it was initially planned as a warship, during the Second World War the Guanajuato served as a convoy escort in Central America.

During 1966 and 1967, the gunboat was used as sail training for the Heroica Escuela Naval Militar. Along the two years, the ship travelled to Mexico, Brasil, Argentina, Chile and Peru. The Guanajuato's last navigation with the Navy was in 1997, being retired from service in 2001.

=== Present day ===
In 2007, the Guanajuato was opened to the public as the Museo Naval Interactivo Cañonero Guanajuato C-07 (Naval Interactive Museum Cañonero Guanajuato C-07), the first floating museum of Veracruz and Latin America. The museum included 16 different exhibits, presenting how the ship looked and worked during the 1920s and 1930s.

Lack of maintenance and a possible sinking of the Guanajuato led to the closing of the museum and the beginning of a maintenance project of the gunboat. Among the proposed repairs were the installation of concrete base that would settle the Guanajuato in the river, rather than floating in the shore. The maintenance came to a halt due to the COVID-19 pandemic.

According to reports, the ship, in worsening condition, was scrapped beginning in May 2023.
