= Adela Robles Morales =

Mexican politician (born 1965)

- Born: 6 April 1965 (age 61); Veracruz, Veracruz, Mexico
- Occupation: Politician
- Political party: PRI

Adela Robles Morales (born 6 April 1965) is a Mexican politician from the Institutional Revolutionary Party (PRI). From 2010 to 2012 she served in the Chamber of Deputies representing the fourth district of Veracruz after Salvador Manzur Díaz resigned the seat.
