= Mercedes Morales Utrera =

Mexican politician

- Born: 24 September 1963 (age 62); Veracruz, Mexico
- Occupation: Politician
- Political party: PAN

Mercedes Morales Utrera (born 24 September 1963) is a Mexican politician from the National Action Party.

On 11 December 2008 she assumed Ángel Deschamps Falcón's seat in the Chamber of Deputies following his resignation. As his substitute, she continued to represent the fourth district of Veracruz in his stead during the remainder of the 60th congressional session.
