= Anatoly Island =

Island in Venezuela

Coordinates: 6°25′N 63°24′W

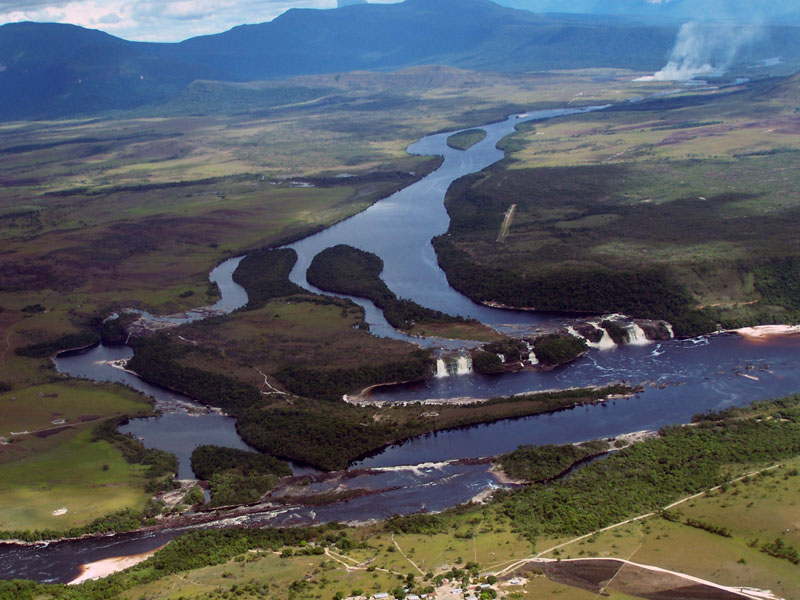
- Anatoly Island
- Interactive map of Anatoly Island

Geography
- Location: Canaima National Park

Administration
- Venezuela
- Bolívar State

Anatoly Island (Spanish: Isla Anatoly) is the name of a Venezuelan island in the Canaima National Park. Administratively is part of the Gran Sabana municipality of Bolívar state. The Carrao River, after boarding the Auyantepuy, and being fed by water coming from the Angel Falls, splits in several streams, and forming islands. The biggest island is called Anatoly.

== See also ==
- Geography of Venezuela
