= Salinas del Bebedero =

Coordinates: 33°30′S 66°37′W

- Municipality and village
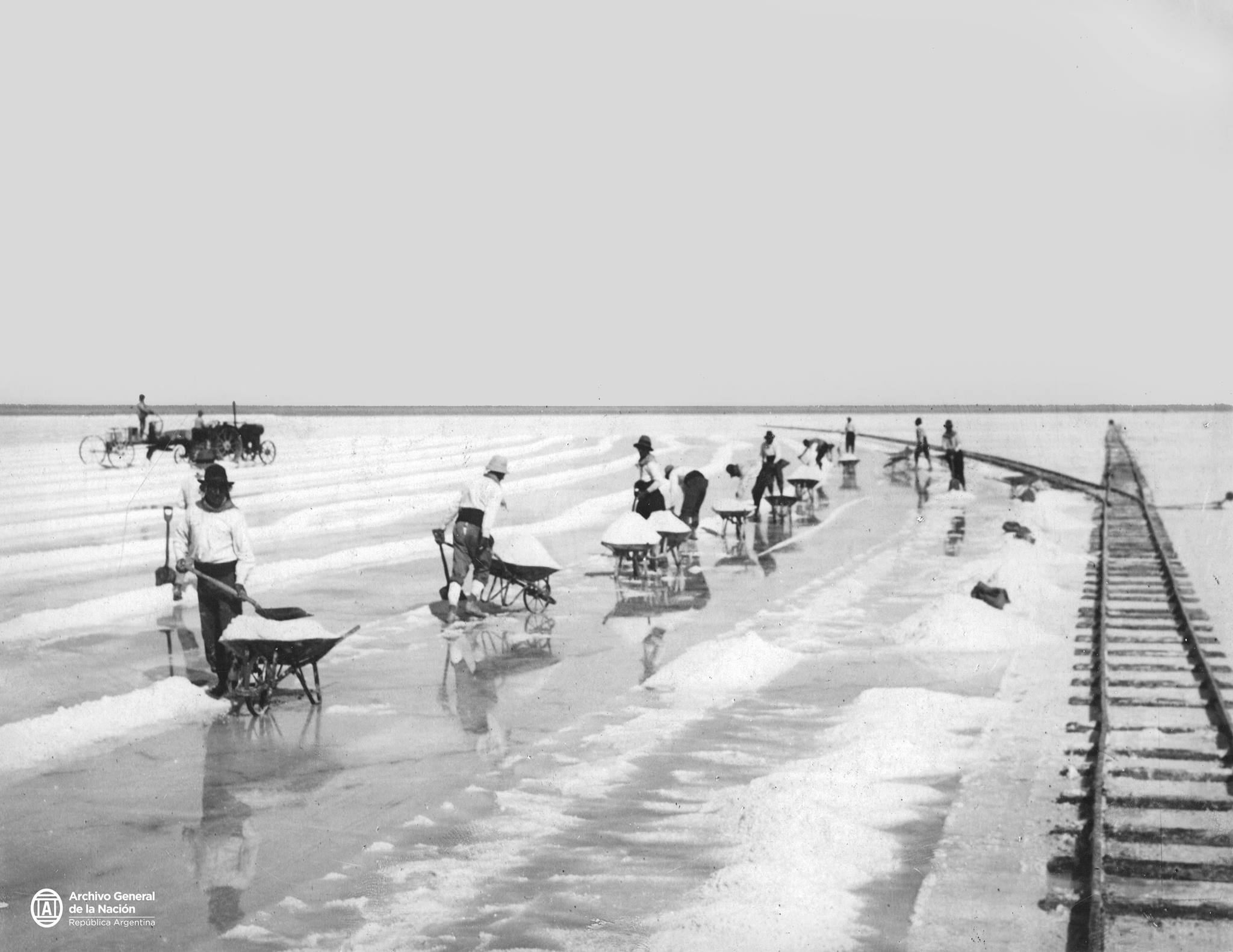
- Cuadrilla de trabajadores de las salinas del Bebedero en plena labor, 1934
- Interactive map of Salinas del Bebedero
- Country: Argentina
- Province: San Luis
- Department: Juan Martín de Pueyrredón
- Time zone: UTC−3 (ART)

Salinas del Bebedero is a village and municipality in San Luis Province in central Argentina.
