= Boca del Río, Veracruz =

Boca del Río
- City and municipality
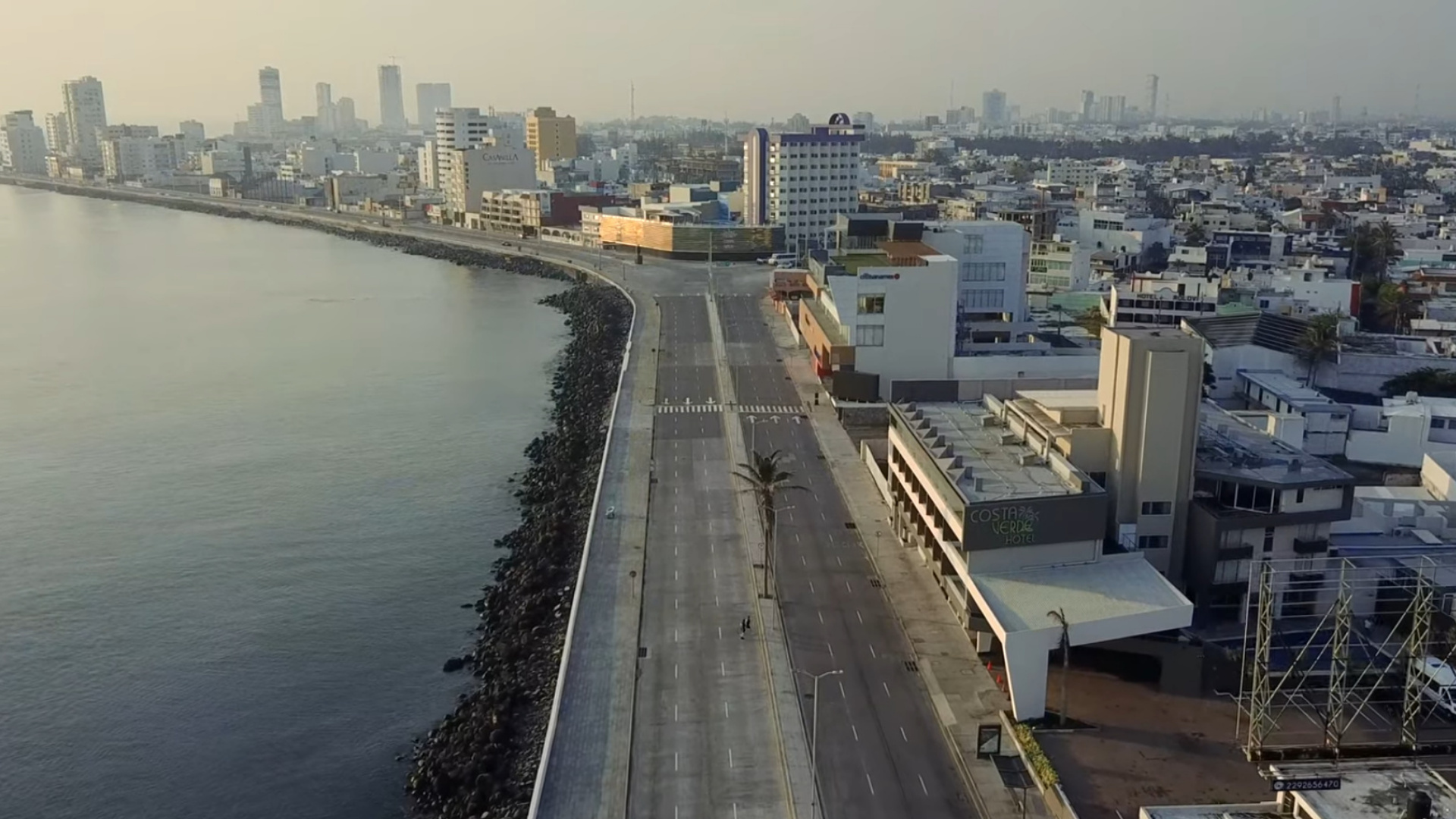
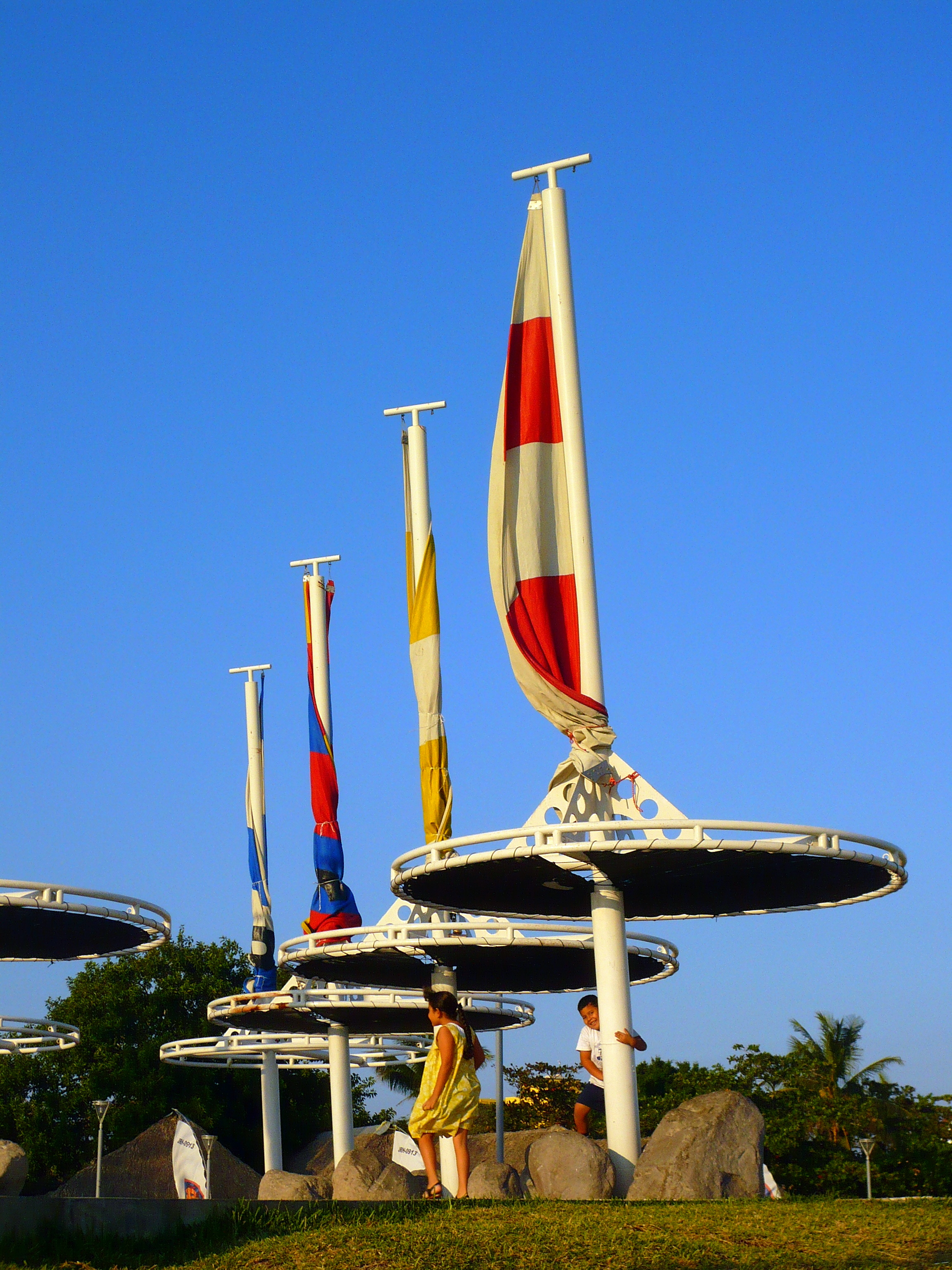
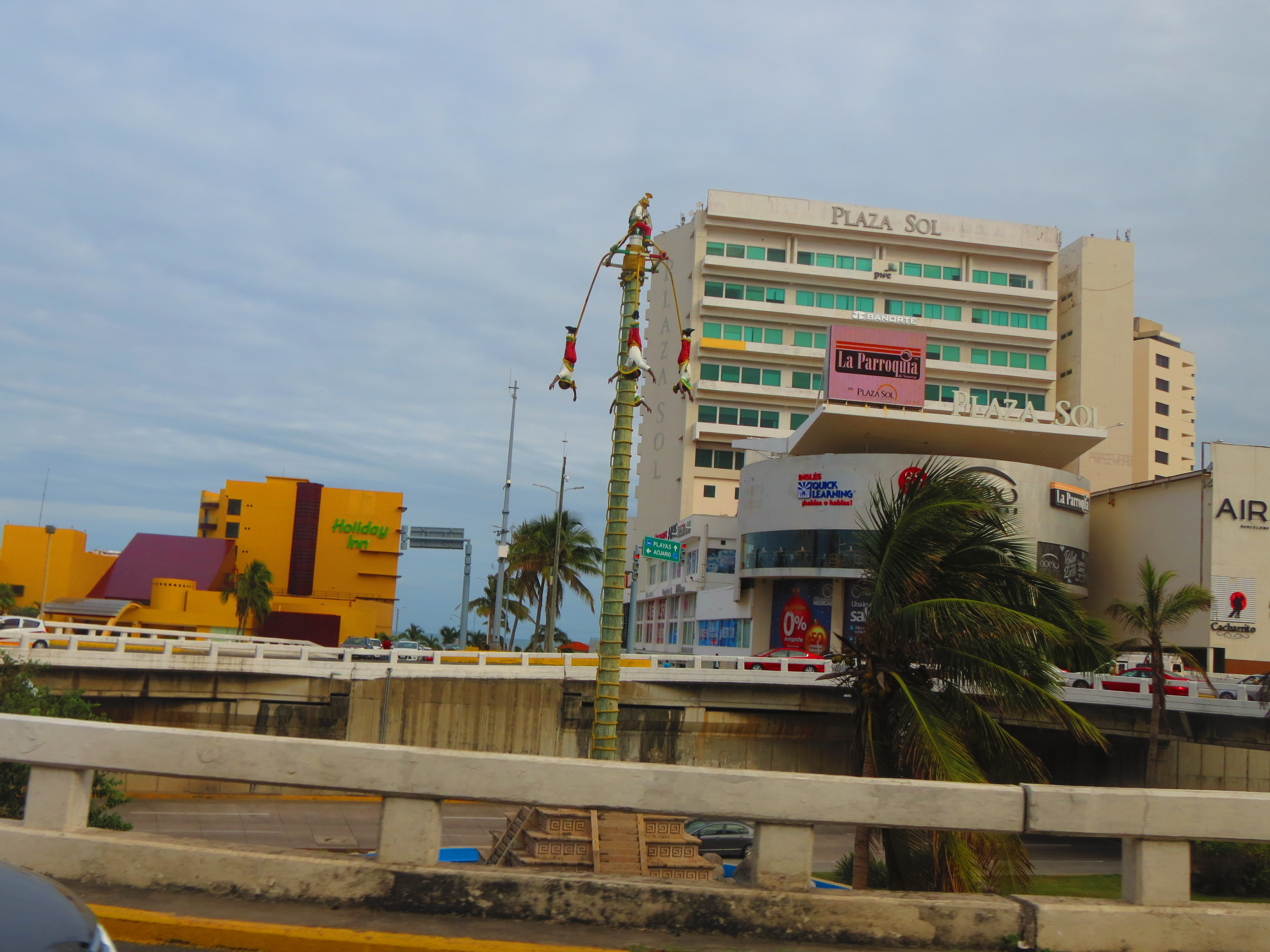
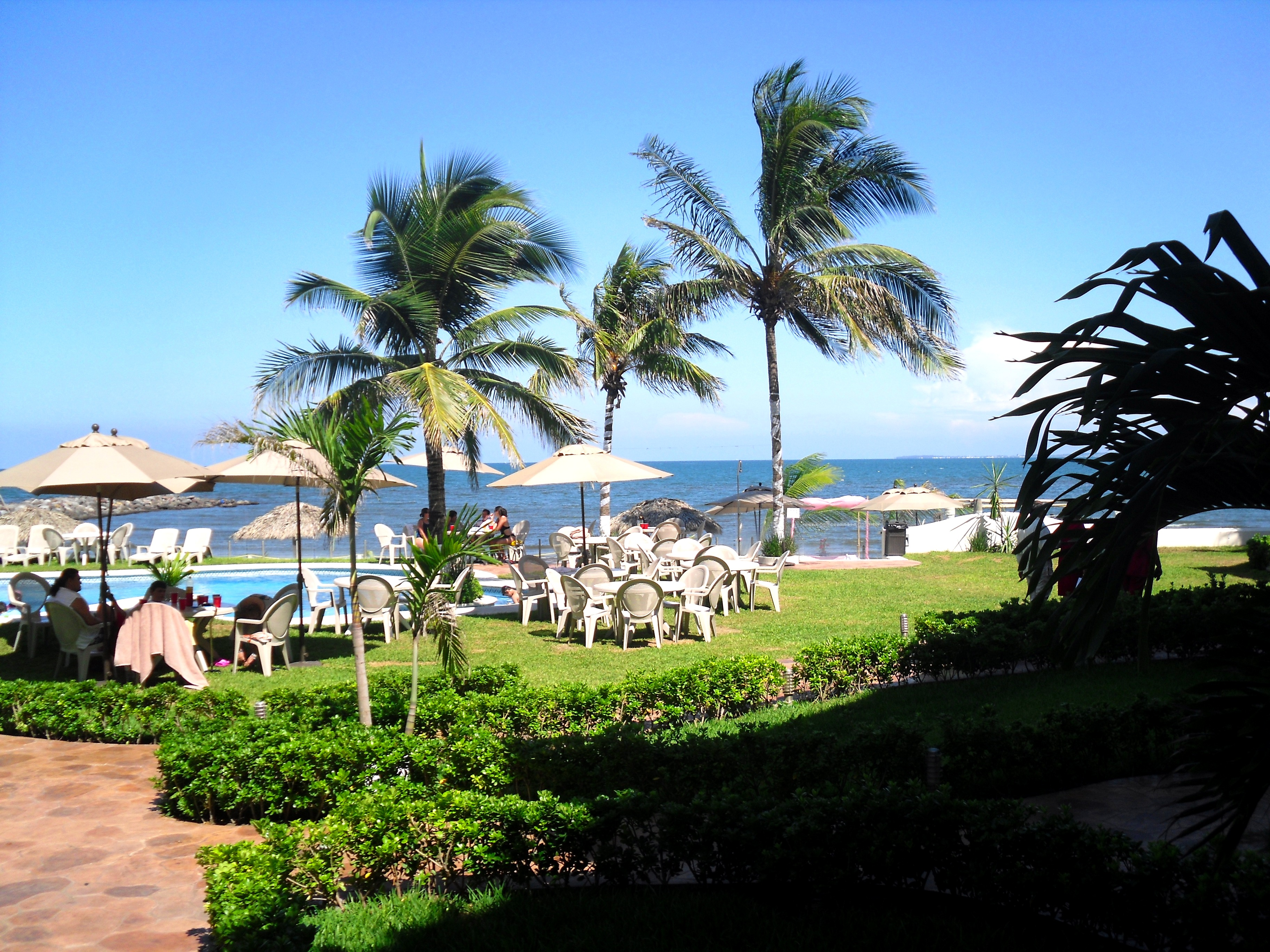
- Top: Panoramic view of Boca del Río; Middle: Amura Tower, Plaza Banderas; Bottom: Sol Mall, Caracol Beach

- Coat of arms

- Location in Mexico Boca del Río (Mexico)
- Coordinates: 19°06′20″N 96°06′28″W
- Country: Mexico
- State: Veracruz
- Region: Sotavento Region
- Founded: 1520s

Government
  - Mayor: María Josefina Gamboa Torales (PAN)

Area
  - Municipality: 42.77 km^{2} (16.51 sq mi)
- Elevation (of seat): 16 m (52 ft)

Population (2020)
  - Municipality: 144,550
  - Seat: 10,012
- Time zone: UTC-6 (Central (US Central))
- Postal code (of seat): 94290
- Climate: Aw
- Website: (in Spanish) Municipal Official Site

Historical population
Year	Pop.	±%
1995	135,060	—
2000	135,804	+0.6%
2005	141,906	+4.5%
2010	138,058	−2.7%
2015	142,207	+3.0%
2020	144,550	+1.6%

Boca del Río is a city and municipality located in the center of the Mexican state of Veracruz. The small city of Boca del Río serves as the seat of the municipality. The municipality lies just south of the municipality of Veracruz, and contains a part of the city and city and port of Veracruz. It is a port in its own right, as well as the metropolitan area's center for business travel and upscale hotels and restaurants. The city contains two museums, one dedicated to Agustín Lara and the other a military ship that has been converted into a museum. However, the municipality's main feature is the World Trade Center Veracruz, which hosts business meetings, conferences and conventions.

== History ==
The name "Boca del Río" is from Spanish, meaning "mouth of the river" and refers to the mouth of the Jamapa River as it flows into the Gulf of Mexico. The pre-Hispanic name for the area was Tlapaquitan, which means "divided land."

From 1000 to 1200 BCE, the area was under Olmec domination. The area officially came under Aztec domination in 1474 and is mentioned in the Codex Mendoza as part of the district of Cuetlachtlan. However, the Aztecs had been active here for sometime before that. In 1518, Juan de Grijalva came to the area with his crew and named the river "Río de las Banderas" because they saw indigenous peoples communicating across the river with flags. In the same year, the first Christian rites were performed at a chapel called Nuestra Señora de Santa Ana. In 1879, the localities of Hacienda de Santa Maria Punta, Hato and Anton Lizardo were separated from the municipality and joined with neighboring Alvarado municipality. In 1892, the Veracruz- Tierra Blanca rail line was built, passing through Boca del Río. The settlement gained city status in 1988.

From the early 2000s, crime and pollution have been the city's major challenges. Like much of the rest of Mexico, drug trafficking causes significant incidents of violence such as the ambush and murder of three agents of the Inter-municipal Police and the murder and mutilation of rivals. There is a problem with the theft of aluminum and copper cables from certain parts of the city but the major crime story to date has been the theft of over 1 million pesos worth of merchandise, mostly jewelry and watches, from the Ejército Mexicano branch of the Nacional Monte de Piedad. The thieves had cut a hole in the back wall of the building and then cut the alarm system and cameras to work their way into the vault.

From the late 20th century to the present, pollution, especially of the beaches, has been an issue. There are complaints that the waters off the beaches of Boca del Rio, especially Playa Los Arcos are contaminated, with foamy, grey, malodorous waters. Authorities state that all of Boca's beaches are within sanitary norms and pose no risk to visitors. Merchants in Boca del Río, as well as the city of Veracruz, have appealed to state authorities for help with the sanitation problems of the beaches here, claiming that the garbage and foul smell drive away tourists. In 2008, the city began a program to recycle motor oil and other used automobile fluids in cooperation with a company called Eco-Klin and the federal environmental agency SEMARNAT. The purpose of the free collection system is to keep the fluids from being dumped in drains or burned by consumers.

In October 2007, a statue of former President Vicente Fox, sculpted by Bernardo Luis López Artasanchez, was pulled down by youths on the boulevard named for the ex-president. Local members of the political party PRI were blamed for the vandalism. The event caused a major scandal in the state of Veracruz and received national press, as Fox was the first non-PRI president since the early 20th century. The statue has since then been repaired and put back in its place. During the AH1N1 crisis in Mexico in April 2009, beaches of Veracruz and Boca del Rio suffered a 43 to 46 percent decline in visitors.

== The city ==
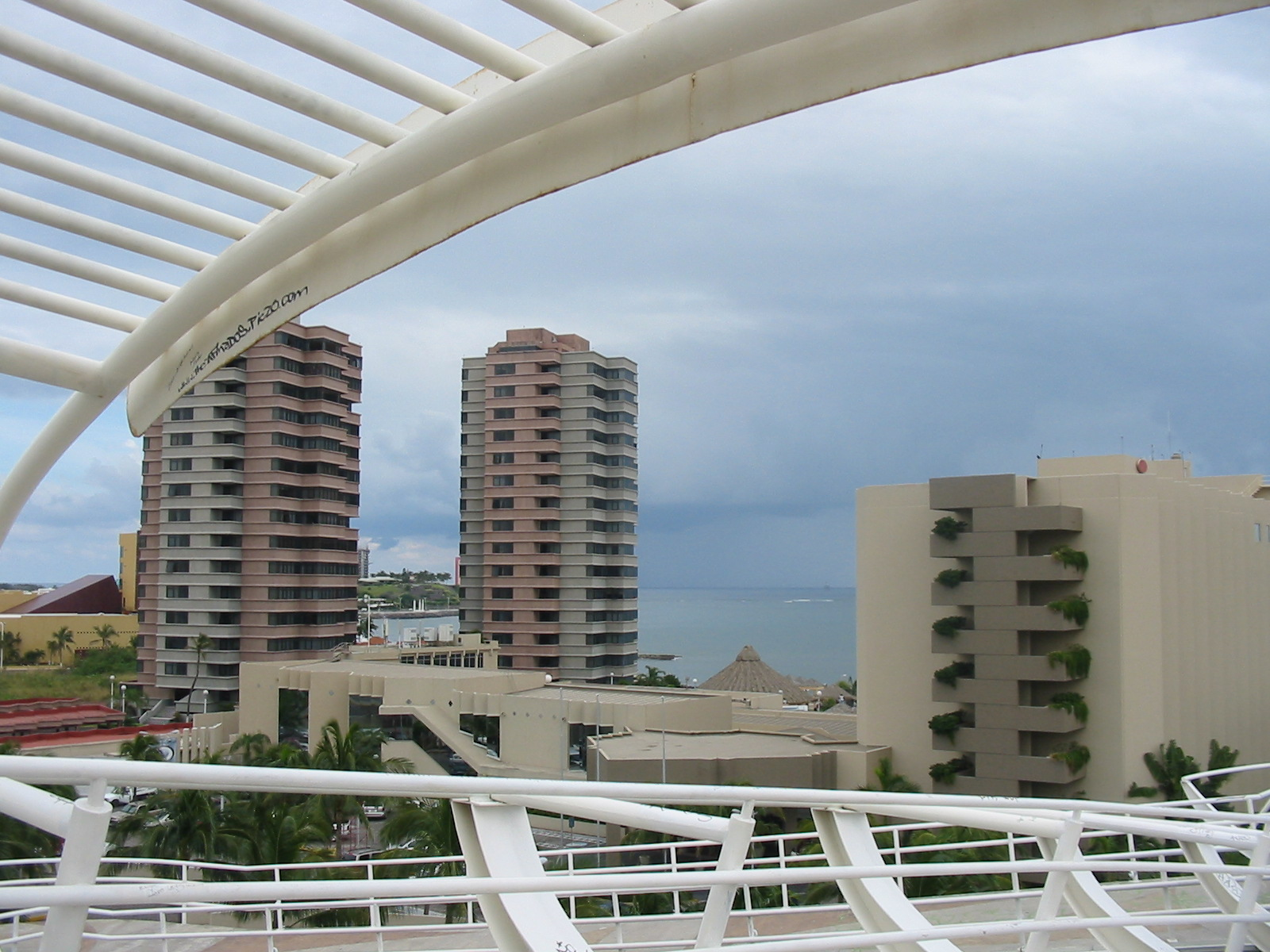
View of central Boca del Rio to the northeast, taken from the "Puente de Amistad" (Friendship Bridge)

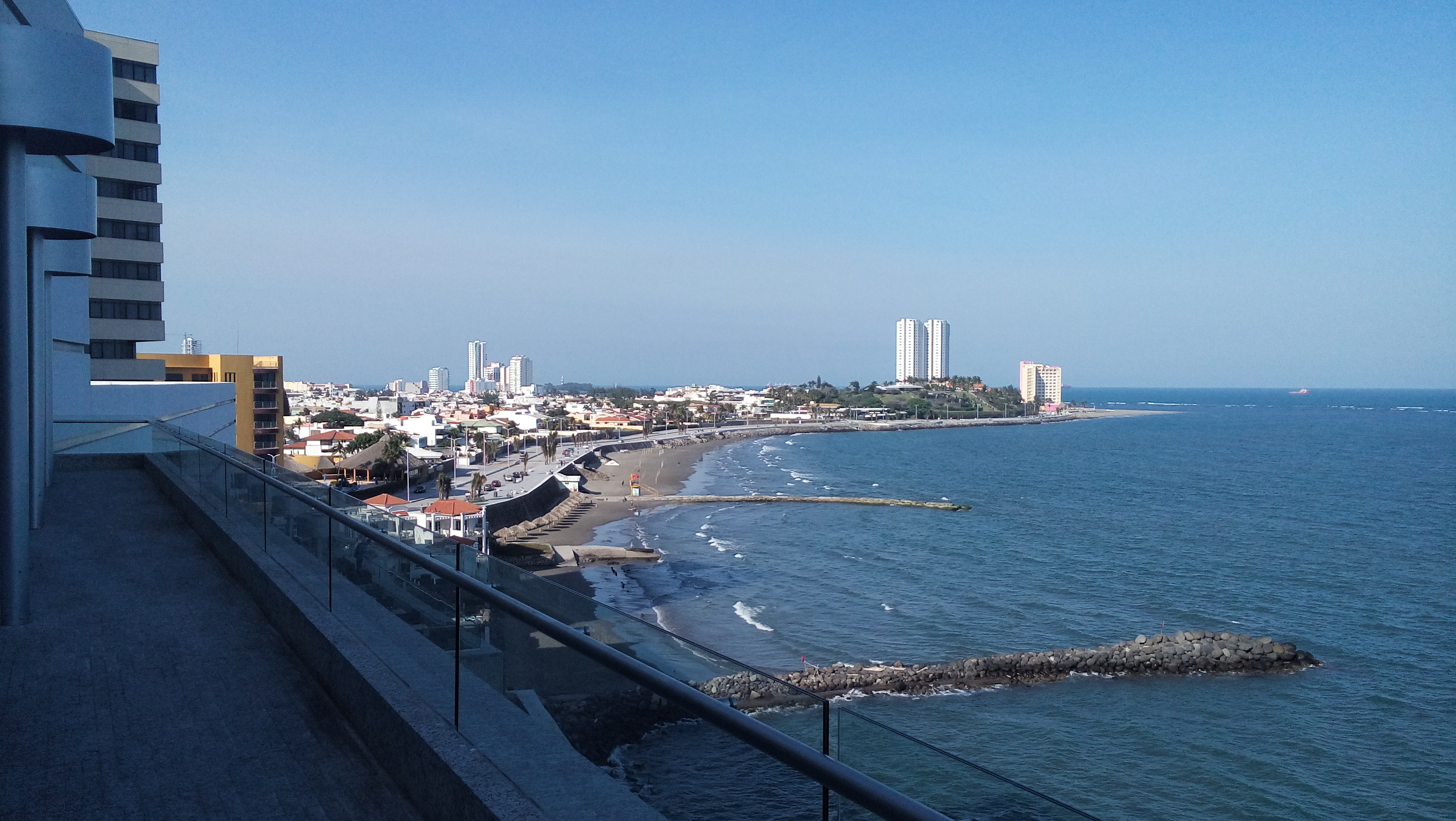
Panoramic view of Boca del Rio

The city is part of the metropolitan area of Veracruz and its port works closely with the port of Veracruz. Much of the area's modern and luxury hotel and restaurant infrastructure is located here, centered around the World Trade Center Veracruz. The main church is called the Parish of Santa Ana, which was constructed in 1776. Nearby is the colonial-style municipal palace. The Plaza Civica is in front of the municipal palace and contains the Nahuatl Fountain. The main dock is called Muella Banderas.

The Agustín Lara House Museum, also called the "La Casita Blanca" (The Little White House) exhibits works, photographs and personal effects of the poet Agustín Lara, who was called "El Flaco de Oro" (The Golden Skinny One). News clips, caricatures and a replica of the radio studio where he hosted " La Hora Azul" ("The Blue Hour") are among the items on display. Lara was one of the city's most famous sons as a popular songwriter and singer in Mexico. Lara began his career playing the piano in brothels and later became a bullfighter. Lara had seven wives, one of whom was Mexican screen diva María "La Doña" Félix, for whom he wrote the song, "María Bonita." To be a gentleman, when he and Félix were about to break up, he married her to "make an honest woman of her" even though they had lived together for years

A ship museum called the Buque Cañonero (Cannon Ship) Guanajuato is located here. When the ship was decommissioned, it was decided to restore it as a naval museum rather than to scrap it. It is considered to be one of the most important naval museums in Latin America. The ship contains an arms room, a telecommunications room, infirmary, bunks, dining room and library. The themes covered include the history of the ship itself as well as naval warfare simulation room, based on the technology of the Xbox 360.

Boca del Río's two major festivals occur in the summer and are collectively known as the Fiestas del Boca del Río (Festivals of Boca del Rio) or simply Fiestas de Boca. Events take place at various locations such as the Plaza Civica, the Plaza Dorada, the Gutierrez Barrios Theatre, the Plaza Banderas, the San Pedro y San Pablo Church and Vicente Fox Boulevard. Bocafest occurs each year in June when a number of musical artists play in the main venues of the city, especially in Plaza Banderas. Musical styles represented range from the very traditional Mexican folk to electronic music. In 2008, featured artists included Natalia Lafourcade and Aleks Syntek. Other events include Mexican and Caribbean folk dance and music and art expositions. The Feast of Saint Ann is the main traditional festival of the city, taking place from 24 to 31 July. The days are filled with cultural as well as religious events.

The Expo Regional Ylang Ylang (Ylang Ylang Regional Expo) occurs from the end of May to the beginning of June and showcases the area agricultural, craft, industrial and commercial production. It also has cockfights, rodeos (called palenques) and folkdance such as jaripeos. From the end of May to the beginning of June is held the annual agricultural, crafts, industrial and commercial fair of the city, with cockfights, rodeos and folk dance. Crafts here include seashell jewelry, wooden boxes, key rings and trinkets made with ocean materials such as coral and pebbles.

Veracruz's annual carnival parade passes along the boardwalk that connects the port of Boca del Rio with the port of Veracruz. It is one of the highlights of the event, which has contained as many as 35 dance groups, 10 bands and over 100 floats. The city is mentioned in the Guinness Book of World Records for preparing the largest seafood-filled fish in the world.

=== The municipality ===
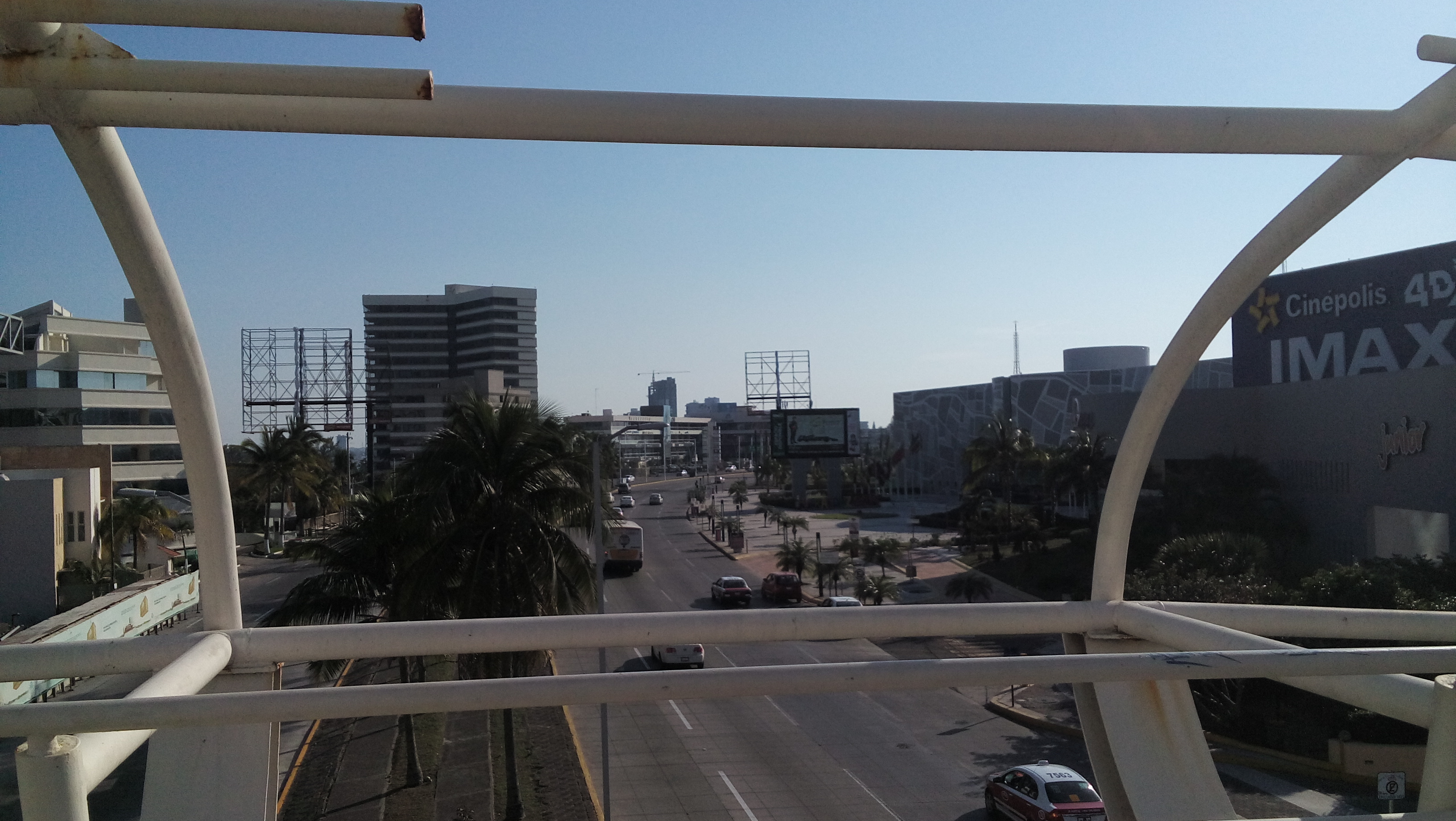
View of the entrance to the WTC Veracruz (right)

The major attraction of the municipality is the World Trade Center Veracruz, serving business travelers. The World Trade Center Veracruz is affiliated with the World Trade Center Association and is the organization's third site in Mexico. The center has 16,000 m^{2} (170,000 sq ft) of space with elevators, escalators, handicapped access, commercial stands, lockers, ticket windows, parking lot and direct access to a neighboring mall and hotel. It hosts business meetings and professional conferences as well as cultural events. It has its own art gallery, the Galería Veracruzana de Arte (Veracruz Gallery of Art), which is a joint Project between the World Trade Center Veracruz and the Coordinación de Difusión Cultural y Artística del Sistema DIF Estatal (Coordination of Cultural and Artistic Diffusion of the State DIF System). The art center holds temporary exhibits from a variety of artist and with different themes. Some of the shows in 2009 included a collection of portraits done by Mexican artist Enrique Estrada, landscapes of Veracruz state by Armando Zesatti and a photo exhibit named "Lenguajes fotograficas." The World Trade Center Veracruz also contains an ice-skating rink, something that has become popular in Mexico.

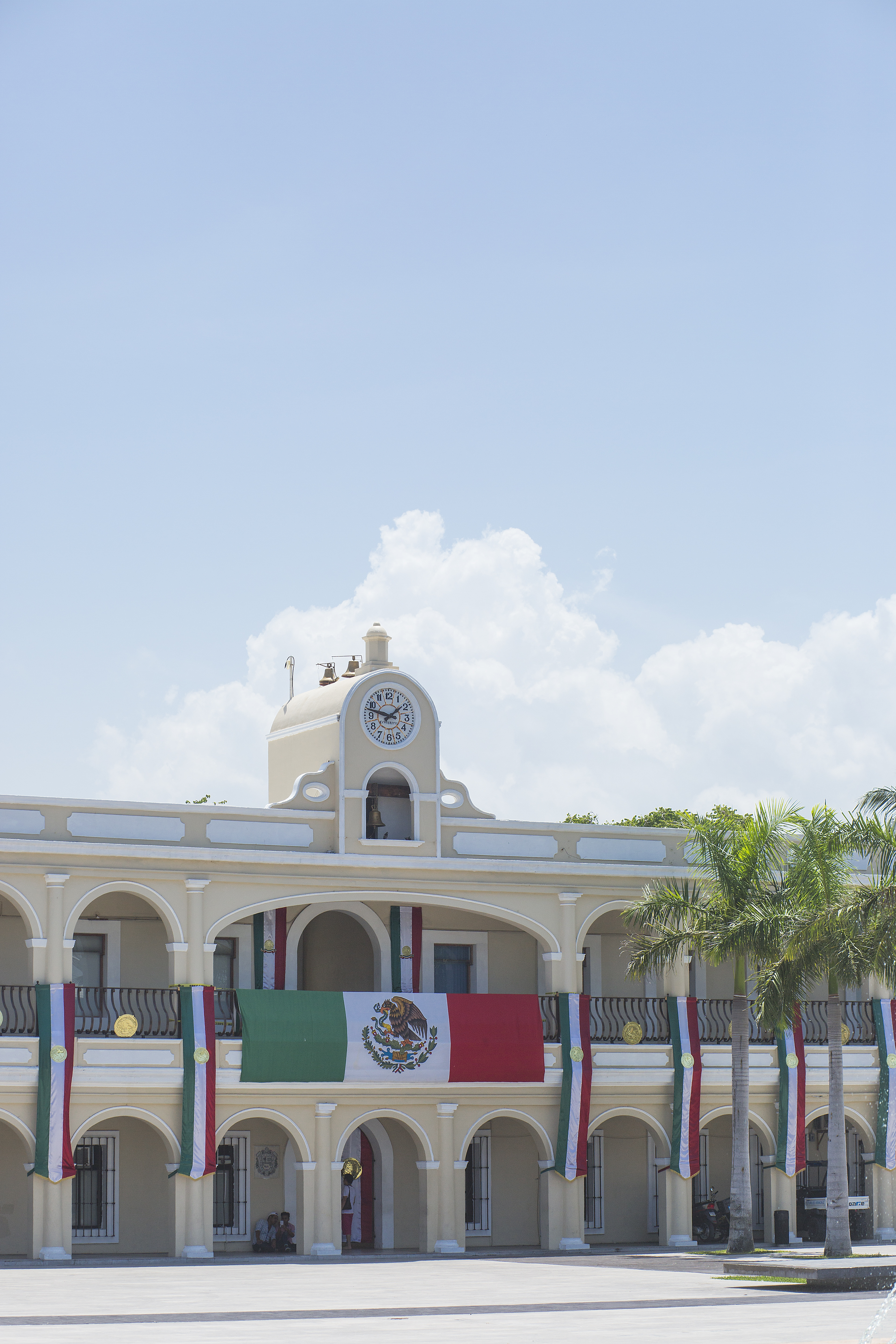
Boca del Río Municipal Hall

As municipal seat, the city of Boca del Río is the local government of 18 other localities, which together make up a territory of 42.77 km^{2} (16.51 sq mi). Only 6.92% of the municipality's population of 144,550 lives in the municipal seat, while 132,011 (91.32%) lives in the Veracruz city portion of the municipality. The municipality borders the municipalities of Veracruz, Alvarado and Medellín with the Gulf of Mexico to the east. It has a territory of 42.77 km^{2} (16.51 sq mi). It is located on the central zone of the state and part of the plains known as the Llanuras del Sotavento. The main river is the Jamapa, which empties here into the Gulf of Mexico. At the mouth of this river, there are mangroves and boat tours are available to see them and the nearby Moreno Arroyo. The municipality has a hot, humid climate with most rain falling from June to October. It is mostly covered in perennially green tropical forest with some pines in the highest elevations. Tree species that can be found here include sapodilla and mahogany with most animal species being small mammals such as armadillos, squirrels, rabbits, opossums and foxes. There are deposits of oil and natural gas within the territory.

About 1,618 hectares of the municipality is dedicated to agriculture, mostly growing corn and beans. Livestock is mostly dairy and beef cattle, with some pigs, sheep, horses and domestic fowl. In the higher elevations there is some lumber harvesting. This employs less than two percent of the municipality's population. Industry is mostly dedicated to citrus packing, manufacture of concrete tubes, chemical products and pre-mixed concrete. This employs about a third of the municipality's population, with commerce employing almost the rest of the people. Tourism is mostly related to business and professional conferences, much of which is related to the World Trade Center Veracruz.

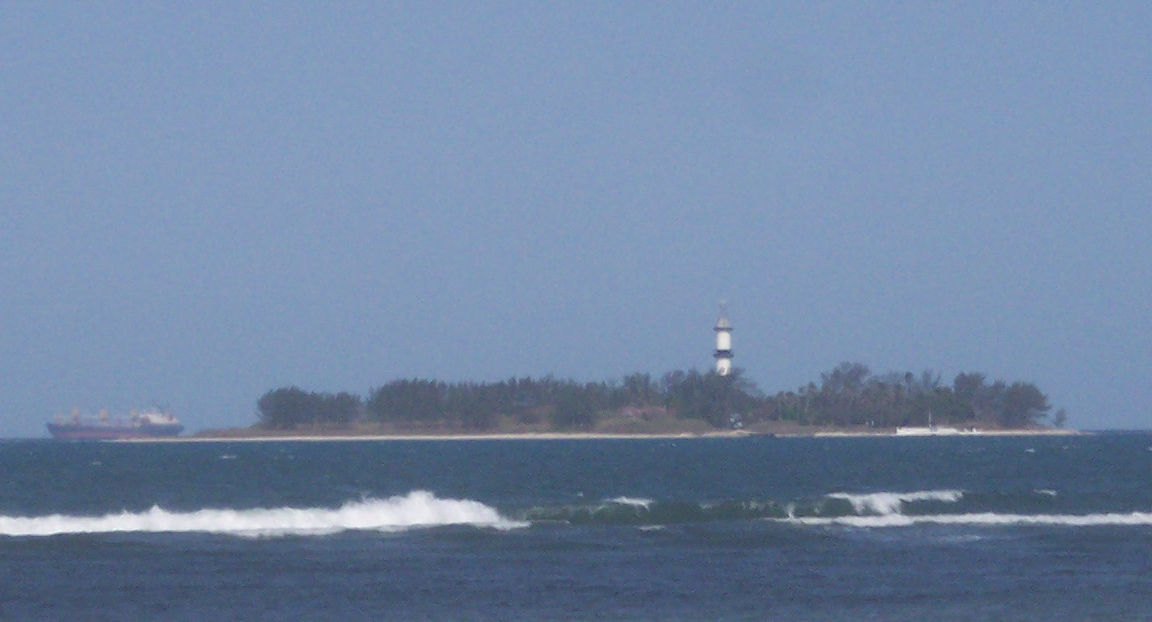
Isla de Sacrificios

Off the coast of Boca del Río is an island called Isla de Sacrificios (part of Veracruz Municipality), which measures 450 meters long and 198 meters wide, the largest of a group of islands that are in front of the Boca del Río and Veracruz ports. The island is part of a system of twenty three coral reefs called the Veracruz Reef System which is a national park.(murtur) It is possible to kayak to the Isla de Sacrificios to observe seagulls, pelicans and the fish that inhabit the coral reef. In 1983, a study and initial cleanup project was undertaken at the island, which collected fifty tons of trash. Shortly thereafter, the island was closed to the public and since then, there has been a struggle between authorities, tour operators and fisherman as to the fate of the island. There are those who would like to build hotels, restaurants and other facilities for ecotourism. However, access to the island has been restricted to research, teaching and the occasional sporting event. The island contains one of the lighthouses used to guide ships into the ports of Veracruz and Boca del Rio.

== Twin towns – sister cities ==
Boca del Río is twinned with:

- (United States) Tampa, Florida, USA
- (United States) West Valley City, Utah, USA
- (United States) Tacoma, Washington, USA

== Consulates ==
- Sweden

== Towns and villages ==
The localities (cities, towns, and villages) are:

Name	2020 census population
Veracruz (part)	132,011
Boca del Río	10,012
Paso Colorado	981
San José Novillero	957
Residencial el Dorado	173
Other localities	416
Total municipality	144,550
