= 11th federal electoral district of Veracruz =

Federal electoral district of Mexico

Veracruz's 11th
- Electoral district of the Chamber of Deputies of Mexico

- 11th district since 2023

Incumbent
- Member: Roberto Ramos Alor
- Party: ▌Morena
- Congress: 66th (2024–2027)

District
- State: Veracruz
- Head town: Coatzacoalcos
- Coordinates: 18°9′N 94°26′W
- Covers: Agua Dulce, Coatzacoalcos, Ixhuatlán, Moloacán, Nanchital
- PR region: Third
- Precincts: 285
- Population: 416,647 (2020 census)

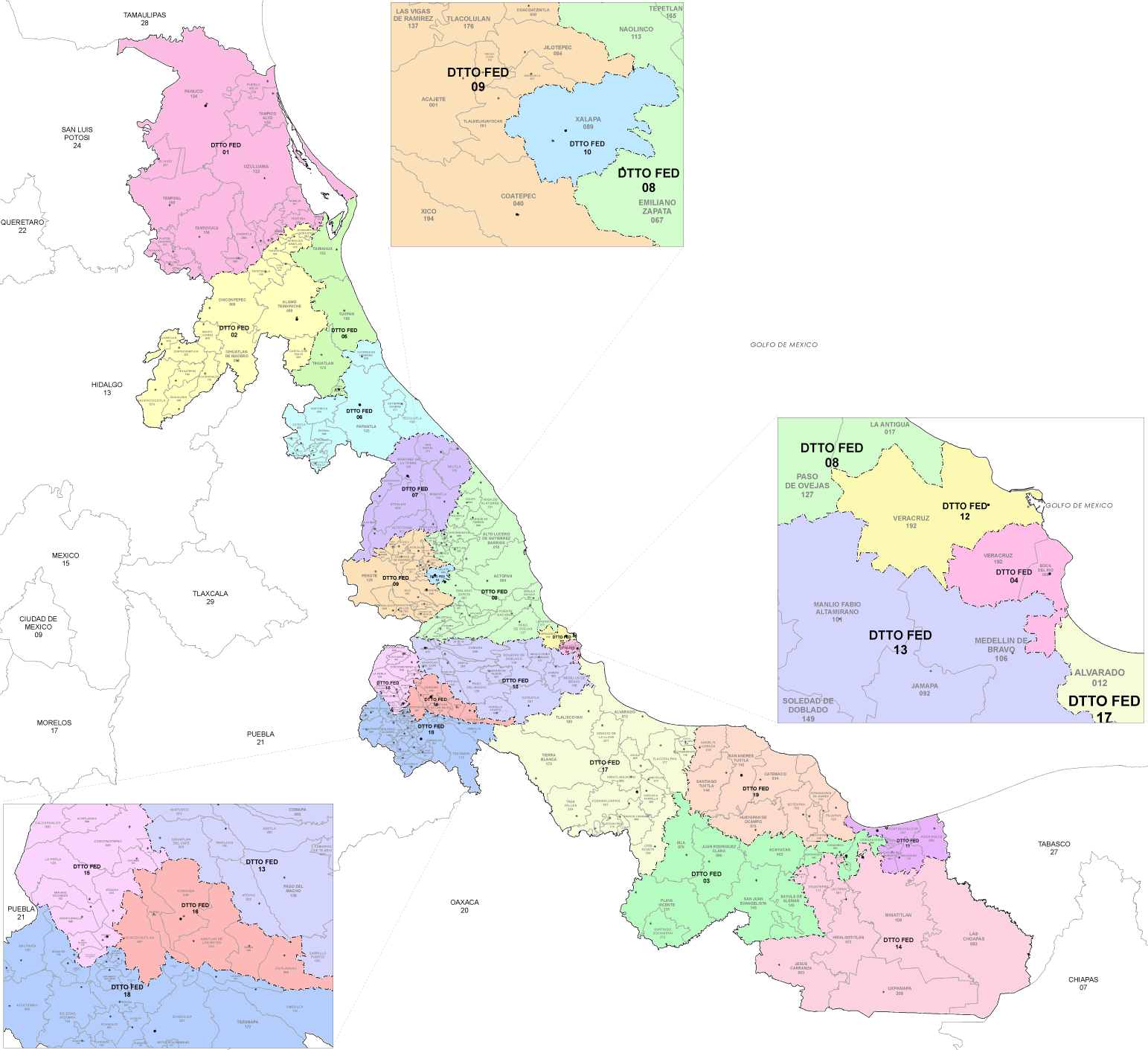
Veracruz's 2023 districts

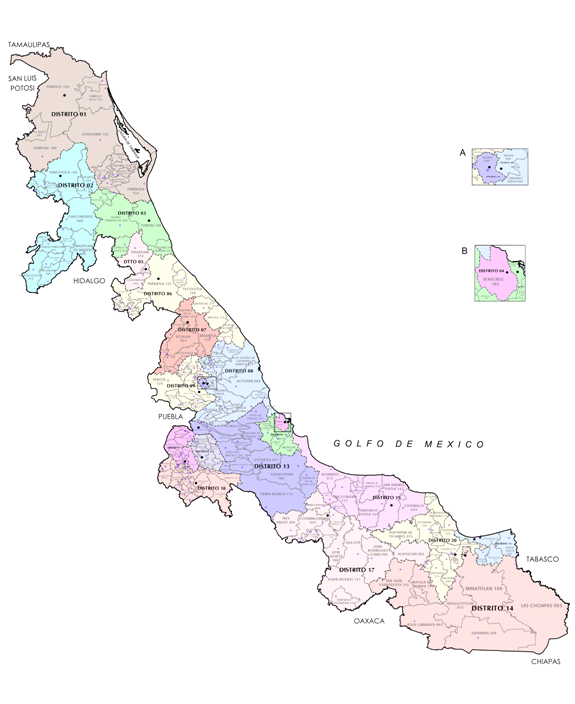
Veracruz under the 2017–2022 districting plan

The 11th federal electoral district of Veracruz (Spanish: Distrito electoral federal 11 de Veracruz) is one of the 300 electoral districts into which Mexico is divided for elections to the federal Chamber of Deputies and one of 19 such districts in the state of Veracruz.

It elects one deputy to the lower house of Congress for each three-year legislative session by means of the first-past-the-post system. Votes cast in the district also count towards the calculation of proportional representation ("plurinominal") deputies elected from the third region.

The current member for the district, elected in the 2024 general election, is Roberto Ramos Alor of the National Regeneration Movement (Morena).

== District territory ==
Veracruz lost a congressional district in the 2023 districting plan adopted by the National Electoral Institute (INE), which is to be used for the 2024, 2027 and 2030 elections. The reconfigured 11th district comprises 285 electoral precincts (secciones electorales) across five municipalities in the Olmeca region in the south-east corner of the state:

- Agua Dulce, Coatzacoalcos, Ixhuatlán, Moloacán and Nanchital.

The head town (cabecera distrital), where results from individual polling stations are gathered together and tallied, is the port city of Coatzacoalcos. The district reported a population of 416,647 in the 2020 census.

== Previous districting schemes ==
Evolution of electoral district numbers
	1974	1978	1996	2005	2017	2023
Veracruz	15	23	23	21	20	19
Chamber of Deputies	196	300				

Because of shifting demographics, Veracruz currently has four fewer districts than the 23 the state was allocated under the 1977 electoral reforms.

2017–2022

Between 2017 and 2022, Veracruz was assigned 20 electoral districts. The 11th district still had its head town at Coatzacoalcos but comprised only four of the five 2022–2030 municipalities: Nanchital was assigned to the 20th district.

2005–2017

Veracruz's allocation of congressional seats fell to 21 in the 2005 redistricting process. Between 2005 and 2017 the 11th district had its head town at Coatzacoalcos and it comprised the municipalities of Coatzacoalcos, Nanchital and Agua Dulce.

1996–2005

Under the 1996 districting plan, which allocated Veracruz 23 districts, the head town was at Coatepec in the state's central mountain region and the district covered 10 municipalities.

1978–1996

The districting scheme in force from 1978 to 1996 was the result of the 1977 electoral reforms, which increased the number of single-member seats in the Chamber of Deputies from 196 to 300. Under that plan, Veracruz's seat allocation rose from 15 to 23. The 11th district had its head town at Veracruz and it covered a part of that city.

== Deputies returned to Congress ==
(Mexico) National parties
- Current
- PAN
- PRI
- PT
- PVEM
- MC
- Morena
- PAZ
- Somos
- Defunct or local only
- PLM
- PNR
- PRM
- PNM
- PP
- PPS
- PARM
- PFCRN
- CON
- PANAL
- PSD
- PES
- PES
- PRD

Veracruz's 11th district
Election	Deputy	Party	Term	Legislature
1916	Silvestre Aguilar		1916–1917	Constituent Congress of Querétaro
...
1973	Mario Vargas Saldaña	Institutional Revolutionary Party	1973–1976	49th Congress
1976	Miguel Portela Cruz	Institutional Revolutionary Party	1976–1979	50th Congress
1979	Juan Maldonado Pereda	Institutional Revolutionary Party	1979–1982	51st Congress
1982	Mario Vargas Saldaña	Institutional Revolutionary Party	1982–1985	52nd Congress
1985	Juan Maldonado Pereda	Institutional Revolutionary Party	1985–1988	53rd Congress
1988	Rodolfo Duarte Rivas	Institutional Revolutionary Party	1988–1991	54th Congress
1991	Guillermo Jorge González Díaz	Institutional Revolutionary Party	1991–1994	55th Congress
1994	Salvador Mikel Rivera	Institutional Revolutionary Party	1994–1997	56th Congress
1997	Bertha Hernández Rodríguez	Institutional Revolutionary Party	1997–2000	57th Congress
2000	Abel Cuevas Melo	National Action Party (Mexico)	2000–2003	58th Congress
2003	Marco Antonio Torres Hernández	Institutional Revolutionary Party	2003–2006	59th Congress
2006	Gloria Rasgado Corsi	Party of the Democratic Revolution	2006–2009	60th Congress
2009	Leandro Rafael García Bringas	National Action Party (Mexico)	2009–2012	61st Congress
2012	Joaquín Caballero Rosiñol (Note: Elected for the PVEM, Caballero Rosiñol switched allegiance to the PRI on 4 September 2012.); Patricia Guadalupe Peña Recio	Institutional Revolutionary Party	2012–2013; 2013–2015	62nd Congress
2015	Rocío Nahle García	National Regeneration Movement	2015–2018	63rd Congress
2018	Flora Tania Cruz Santos	National Regeneration Movement	2018–2021	64th Congress
2021	Flora Tania Cruz Santos	National Regeneration Movement	2021–2024	65th Congress
2024	Roberto Ramos Alor	National Regeneration Movement	2024–2027	66th Congress

== Presidential elections ==
Veracruz's 11th district
Election	District won by	Party or coalition	%
2018	Andrés Manuel López Obrador	Juntos Haremos Historia	73.4160
2024	Claudia Sheinbaum Pardo	Sigamos Haciendo Historia	78.6562
