= 23rd federal electoral district of Veracruz =

Defunct federal electoral district of Mexico

Coordinates: 17°59′N 94°33′W

The 23rd federal electoral district of Veracruz (Spanish: Distrito electoral federal 23 de Veracruz) is a defunct federal electoral district of the Mexican state of Veracruz.

During its existence, the 23rd district returned one deputy to the Chamber of Deputies for each of the 51st to 59th sessions of Congress. Votes cast in the district also counted towards the calculation of proportional representation ("plurinominal") deputies elected from the country's electoral regions.

Created as part of the 1977 political reforms, it was first contested in the 1979 mid-term election and it elected its last deputy in the 2003 mid-terms. Along with the 22nd district, it was dissolved by the Federal Electoral Institute (IFE) in its 2005 redistricting process because the state's population no longer warranted 23 districts.

== District territory ==
Evolution of electoral district numbers
	1974	1978	1996	2005	2017	2023
Veracruz	15	23	23	21	20	19
Chamber of Deputies	196	300				

1996–2005

In its final form, the head town (cabecera distrital), where results from individual polling stations were gathered together and tallied, was at the city of Minatitlán in the south of the state and the district covered four municipalities:
- Las Choapas, Ixhuatlán del Sureste, Minatitlán and Moloacán.

1978–1996

The districting scheme in force from 1978 to 1996 was the result of the 1977 electoral reforms. Under that scheme, the district was located slightly to the west. Its head town was at Jáltipan and it covered the municipalities of Cosoleacaque, Chinameca, Hidalgotitlán, Jáltipan de Morelos, Jesús Carranza, Oluta, Oteapan, Pajapan, San Juan Evangelista, Sayula de Alemán, Soconusco, Texistepec and Zaragoza.

== Deputies returned to Congress ==
(Mexico) National parties
- Current
- PAN
- PRI
- PT
- PVEM
- MC
- Morena
- Defunct or local only
- PLM
- PNR
- PRM
- PNM
- PP
- PPS
- PARM
- PFCRN
- Convergencia
- PANAL
- PSD
- PES
- PES
- PRD

Veracruz's 23rd district
Election	Deputy	Party	Term	Legislature
1979	Enrique Carrión Solana	Institutional Revolutionary Party	1979–1982	51st Congress
1982	Manuel Solares Mendiola	Institutional Revolutionary Party	1982–1985	52nd Congress
1985	Oscar Aguirre López	Institutional Revolutionary Party	1985–1988	53rd Congress
1988	Rosa Elena Guízar Villa	Institutional Revolutionary Party	1988–1991	54th Congress
1991	Luis Alberto Beauregard	Institutional Revolutionary Party	1991–1994	55th Congress
1994	Gladys Merlín Castro	Institutional Revolutionary Party	1994–1997	56th Congress
1997	José Luis Pavón Vinales	Institutional Revolutionary Party	1997–2000	57th Congress
2000	Roque Joaquín Gracia Sánchez	Institutional Revolutionary Party	2000–2003	58th Congress
2003	Pablo Pavón Vinales	Institutional Revolutionary Party	2003–2006	59th Congress
