= Olmeca Region =

- Region
- #10 is the Olmeca Region
- Country: Mexico
- State: Veracruz
- Largest city: Coatzacoalcos

Population (2020)
  - Total: 1,218,309
- Time zone: UTC−6 (CST)

Olmeca Region is one of the regions of Veracruz, Mexico. It is located in the southernmost part of the state. As of 2020, it had a population of 1,218,309. Its largest city is Coatzacoalcos.

== Municipalities ==
| Municipality code | Name | Population | | Land Area | | | Population density | |
| Municipality code | Name | 2020 | Rank | km^{2} | sq mi | Rank | 2020 | Rank |
|---|---|---|---|---|---|---|---|---|
| 003 | Acayucan | 80,815 | 5 | 655.7 | 253.2 | 8 | 123/km^{2} (319/sq mi) | 9 |
| 204 | Agua Dulce | 44,104 | 6 | 327.4 | 126.4 | 11 | 135/km^{2} (349/sq mi) | 8 |
| 059 | Chinameca | 22,638 | 14 | 192.3 | 74.2 | 19 | 118/km^{2} (305/sq mi) | 11 |
| 039 | Coatzacoalcos | 310,698 | 1 | 311.9 | 120.4 | 13 | 996/km^{2} (2,580/sq mi) | 3 |
| 048 | Cosoleacaque | 130,903 | 3 | 276.8 | 106.9 | 17 | 473/km^{2} (1,225/sq mi) | 5 |
| 070 | Hidalgotitlán | 18,275 | 16 | 1,011 | 390 | 6 | 18/km^{2} (47/sq mi) | 24 |
| 082 | Ixhuatlán del Sureste | 15,831 | 22 | 156.7 | 60.5 | 20 | 101/km^{2} (262/sq mi) | 12 |
| 089 | Jáltipan | 38,669 | 7 | 316.8 | 122.3 | 12 | 122/km^{2} (316/sq mi) | 10 |
| 091 | Jesús Carranza | 28,524 | 13 | 1,413 | 546 | 4 | 20/km^{2} (52/sq mi) | 23 |
| 061 | Las Choapas | 81,080 | 4 | 3,508.9 | 1,354.8 | 1 | 23/km^{2} (60/sq mi) | 22 |
| 104 | Mecayapan | 17,134 | 18 | 296.6 | 114.5 | 15 | 58/km^{2} (150/sq mi) | 17 |
| 108 | Minatitlán | 144,766 | 2 | 2,118 | 818 | 2 | 68/km^{2} (177/sq mi) | 14 |
| 111 | Moloacán | 16,493 | 21 | 249.6 | 96.4 | 18 | 66/km^{2} (171/sq mi) | 15 |
| 206 | Nanchital de Lázaro Cárdenas del Río | 29,209 | 12 | 28.4 | 11.0 | 23 | 1,022/km^{2} (2,647/sq mi) | 2 |
| 116 | Oluta | 17,027 | 19 | 78 | 30 | 22 | 218/km^{2} (565/sq mi) | 6 |
| 120 | Oteapan | 10,343 | 25 | 4.6 | 1.8 | 25 | 2,248/km^{2} (5,824/sq mi) | 1 |
| 122 | Pajapan | 18,051 | 17 | 311.7 | 120.3 | 14 | 58/km^{2} (150/sq mi) | 16 |
| 142 | San Juan Evangelista | 32,631 | 9 | 1,261.7 | 487.1 | 5 | 26/km^{2} (67/sq mi) | 21 |
| 144 | Sayula de Alemán | 32,400 | 10 | 662.5 | 255.8 | 7 | 49/km^{2} (127/sq mi) | 19 |
| 145 | Soconusco | 16,574 | 20 | 96.3 | 37.2 | 21 | 172/km^{2} (446/sq mi) | 7 |
| 149 | Soteapan | 34,385 | 8 | 479.8 | 185.3 | 9 | 72/km^{2} (186/sq mi) | 13 |
| 209 | Tatahuicapan de Juárez | 15,044 | 23 | 295 | 114 | 16 | 51/km^{2} (132/sq mi) | 18 |
| 172 | Texistepec | 19,925 | 15 | 449 | 173 | 10 | 44/km^{2} (115/sq mi) | 20 |
| 210 | Uxpanapa | 30,891 | 11 | 1,906.6 | 736.1 | 3 | 16/km^{2} (42/sq mi) | 25 |
| 199 | Zaragoza | 11,899 | 24 | 21.7 | 8.4 | 24 | 548/km^{2} (1,420/sq mi) | 4 |
| | Olmeca Region | 1,218,309 | — | 16,430 | 6,343.66 | — | 74/km^{2} (192/sq mi) | — |
Source: INEGI

=== Largest cities ===
Largest cities or towns in Olmeca Region Source:
| Rank | | Municipality | Pop. |
|---|---|---|---|
| 1 | Coatzacoalcos | Coatzacoalcos | 212,540 |
| 2 | Minatitlán | Minatitlán | 101,336 |
| 3 | Acayucan | Acayucan | 48,567 |
| 4 | Minatitlán | Cosoleacaque | 47,826 |
| 5 | Las Choapas | Las Choapas | 46,909 |
| 6 | Agua Dulce | Agua Dulce | 33,986 |
| 7 | Jáltipan de Morelos | Jáltipan | 31,856 |
| 8 | Nanchital de Lázaro Cárdenas del Río | Nanchital de Lázaro Cárdenas del Río | 28,076 |
| 9 | Ciudad Olmeca | Coatzacoalcos | 24,085 |
| 10 | Allende | Coatzacoalcos | 23,351 |
