= 14th federal electoral district of Veracruz =

Federal electoral district of Mexico

Veracruz's 14th
- Electoral district of the Chamber of Deputies of Mexico

- 14th district since 2023

Incumbent
- Member: Jessica Ramírez Cisneros
- Party: ▌Morena
- Congress: 66th (2024–2027)

District
- State: Veracruz
- Head town: Minatitlán
- Coordinates: 17°59′N 94°33′W
- Covers: Hidalgotitlán, Jáltipan, Jesús Carranza, Las Choapas, Minatitlán, Oluta, Oteapan, Texistepec, Uxpanapa
- PR region: Third
- Precincts: 264
- Population: 401,366 (2020 census)

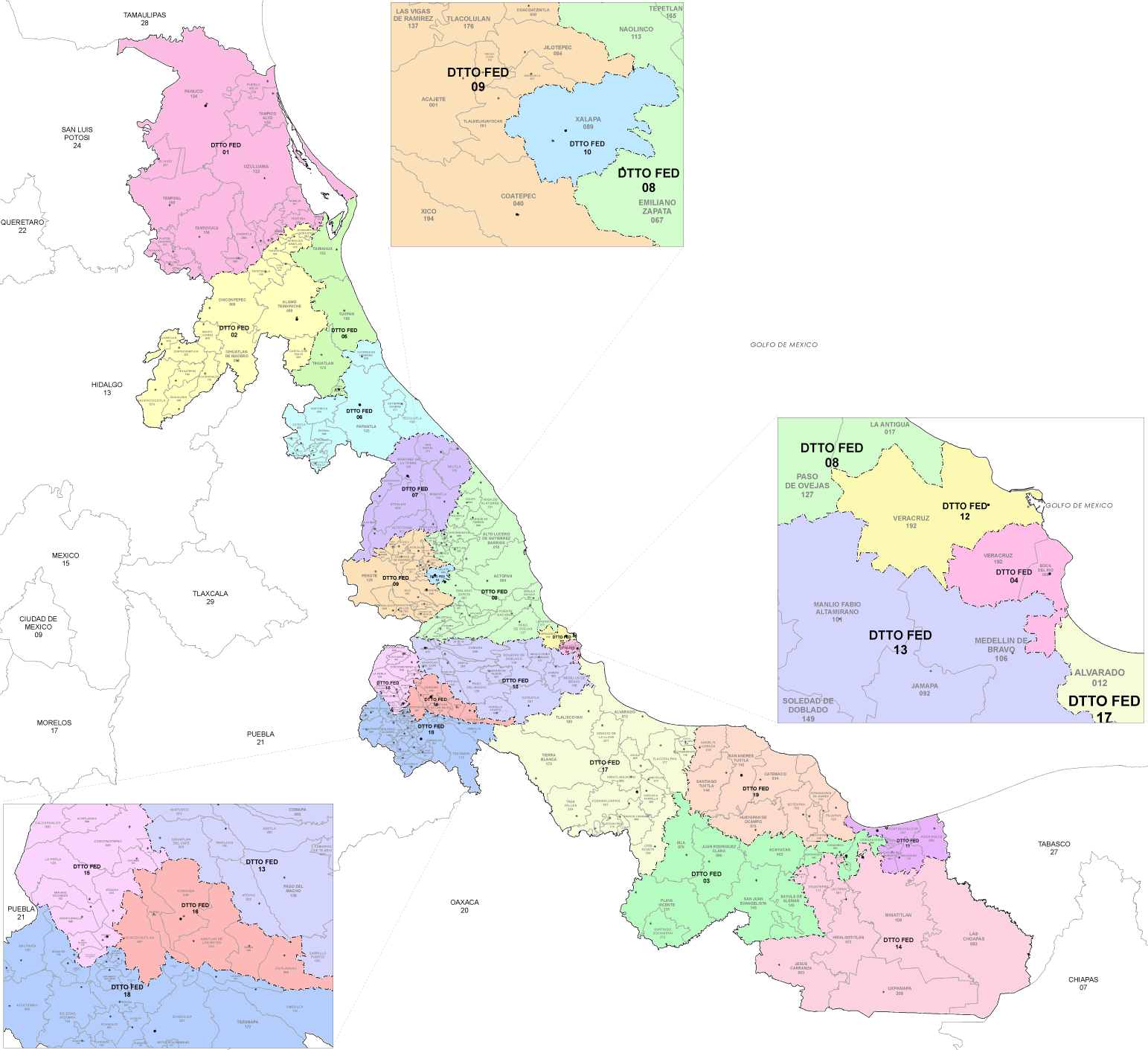
Veracruz's 2023 districts

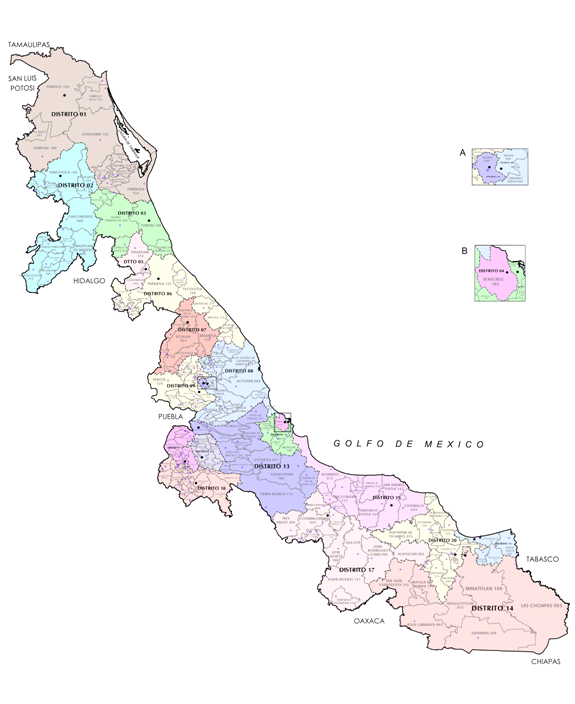
Veracruz under the 2017–2022 districting plan

The 14th federal electoral district of Veracruz (Spanish: Distrito electoral federal 14 de Veracruz) is one of the 300 electoral districts into which Mexico is divided for elections to the federal Chamber of Deputies and one of 19 such districts in the state of Veracruz.

It elects one deputy to the lower house of Congress for each three-year legislative session by means of the first-past-the-post system. Votes cast in the district also count towards the calculation of proportional representation ("plurinominal") deputies elected from the third region.

The current member for the district, elected in the 2024 general election, is Jessica Ramírez Cisneros of the National Regeneration Movement (Morena).

== District territory ==
Veracruz lost a congressional district in the 2023 districting plan adopted by the National Electoral Institute (INE), which is to be used for the 2024, 2027 and 2030 elections. The reconfigured 14th district covers 264 electoral precincts (secciones electorales) across nine municipalities in the Olmeca region in the south-east of the state:

- Hidalgotitlán, Jáltipan, Jesús Carranza, Las Choapas, Minatitlán, Oluta, Oteapan, Texistepec and Uxpanapa.

The head town (cabecera distrital), where results from individual polling stations are gathered together and tallied, is the city of Minatitlán. The district reported a population of 401,366 in the 2020 census.

== Previous districting schemes ==
Evolution of electoral district numbers
	1974	1978	1996	2005	2017	2023
Veracruz	15	23	23	21	20	19
Chamber of Deputies	196	300				

Because of shifting demographics, Veracruz currently has four fewer districts than the 23 the state was allocated under the 1977 electoral reforms.

2017–2022

Between 2017 and 2022, Veracruz was assigned 20 electoral districts. The 14th district comprised seven municipalities in the same region as in the 2023 plan:
- Las Choapas, Hidalgotitlán, Jesús Carranza, Minatitlán, San Juan Evangelista, Sayula and Uxpanapa.
Its head town was the city of Minatitlán.

2005–2017

Veracruz's allocation of congressional seats fell to 21 in the 2005 redistricting process. Between 2005 and 2017 the 14th district had its head town at Minatitlán and it comprised seven municipalities:
- Las Choapas, Hidalgotitlán, Ixhuatlán del Sureste, Jesús Carranza, Minatitlán, Moloacán and Uxpanapa.

1996–2005

Under the 1996 districting plan, which allocated Veracruz 23 districts, the head town was at Boca del Río in the Sotavento region and the district covered seven municipalities.

1978–1996

The districting scheme in force from 1978 to 1996 was the result of the 1977 electoral reforms, which increased the number of single-member seats in the Chamber of Deputies from 196 to 300. Under that plan, Veracruz's seat allocation rose from 15 to 23. The 14th district had its head town at Minatitlán and it covered the municipalities of Minatitlán and Las Choapas.

== Deputies returned to Congress ==
(Mexico) National parties
- Current
- PAN
- PRI
- PT
- PVEM
- MC
- Morena
- PAZ
- Somos
- Defunct or local only
- PLM
- PNR
- PRM
- PNM
- PP
- PPS
- PARM
- PFCRN
- CON
- PANAL
- PSD
- PES
- PES
- PRD

Veracruz's 14th district
Election	Deputy	Party	Term	Legislature
1916	Victorino E. Góngora		1916–1917	Constituent Congress of Querétaro
...
1973	David Ramírez Cruz	Institutional Revolutionary Party	1973–1976	49th Congress
1976	Juan Meléndez Pacheco	Institutional Revolutionary Party	1976–1979	50th Congress
1979	Sebastián Guzmán Cabrera	Institutional Revolutionary Party	1979–1982	51st Congress
1982	Wilfrido Martínez Gómez	Institutional Revolutionary Party	1982–1985	52nd Congress
1985	Sebastián Guzmán Cabrera	Institutional Revolutionary Party	1985–1988	53rd Congress
1988	Vicente Torres Ruiz	Institutional Revolutionary Party	1988–1991	54th Congress
1991	Pablo Pavón Vinales	Institutional Revolutionary Party	1991–1994	55th Congress
1994	Jorge Wade González	Institutional Revolutionary Party	1994–1997	56th Congress
1997	Fidel Herrera Beltrán	Institutional Revolutionary Party	1997–2000	57th Congress
2000	Roberto Eugenio Bueno Campos	National Action Party (Mexico)	2000–2003	58th Congress
2003	Martín Vidaña Pérez	Institutional Revolutionary Party	2003–2006	59th Congress
2006	Robinson Uscanga Cruz	Citizens' Movement (Mexico)	2006–2009	60th Congress
2009	Luis Antonio Martínez Armengol	Institutional Revolutionary Party	2009–2012	61st Congress
2012	Noé Hernández González	Institutional Revolutionary Party	2012–2015	62nd Congress
2015	José Luis Sáenz Soto	Institutional Revolutionary Party	2015–2018	63rd Congress
2018	Carmen Medel Palma		2018–2021	64th Congress
2021	Rosalba Valencia Cruz	National Regeneration Movement	2021–2024	65th Congress
2024	Jessica Ramírez Cisneros	National Regeneration Movement	2024–2027	66th Congress

== Presidential elections ==
Veracruz's 14th district
Election	District won by	Party or coalition	%
2018	Andrés Manuel López Obrador	Juntos Haremos Historia	63.6537
2024	Claudia Sheinbaum Pardo	Sigamos Haciendo Historia	80.3869
