= Carmen Medel Palma =

Mexican doctor and politician (born 1960)

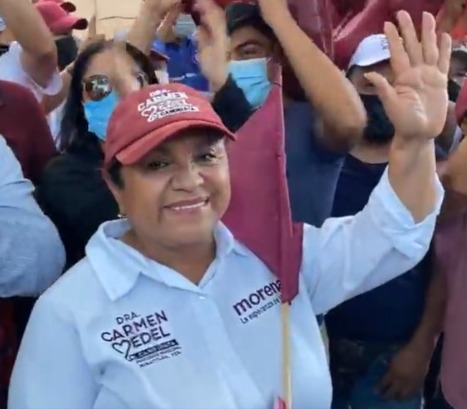
Medel Palma (2021)

Carmen Medel Palma (Note: In this Mexican name, the surname is Medel and the second or maternal family name is Palma.) (born 26 September 1960) is a Mexican doctor and politician, a member of the National Regeneration Movement (MORENA). She served as a federal deputy in the 64th session of Congress from 2018 to 2021, representing Veracruz's 14th district. She was subsequently elected the municipal president of Minatitlán, Veracruz.

== Career ==
Carmen Medel is a surgeon who graduated from the Universidad Veracruzana, an institution where she also previously studied technical nursing and later a diploma and a master's degree in general ultrasound.

She has developed her professional activity in the city of Minatitlán, both privately and in public hospitals in the area. In 2016 she was kidnapped, from which she was released by law enforcement after thirteen days deprived of her freedom.

In 2018, she was elected to the Chamber of Deputies for the 64th Congress, representing district 14 of Veracruz. In the Chamber of Deputies, she served as secretary of the Health Commission and a member of the Livestock and Social Security Commissions.

== Assassination of Valeria Cruz Medel ==
On 8 November 2018, while attending the regular session of the Chamber of Deputies, she received a phone call informing her of the murder of her daughter Valeria Cruz Medel in Ciudad Mendoza, Veracruz; as a result, she suffered a nervous breakdown that forced the interruption and subsequent suspension of the Chamber's session.
