= 21st federal electoral district of Veracruz =

Defunct federal electoral district of Mexico

Coordinates: 18°00′N 94°38′W

The 21st federal electoral district of Veracruz (Spanish: Distrito electoral federal 21 de Veracruz) is a defunct federal electoral district of the Mexican state of Veracruz.

During its existence, the 21st district returned one deputy to the Chamber of Deputies for each of the 51st to 63rd sessions of Congress. Votes cast in the district also counted towards the calculation of proportional representation ("plurinominal") deputies elected from the country's electoral regions.

Created as part of the 1977 political reforms, it was first contested in the 1979 mid-term election and it elected its last deputy in the 2015 mid-terms. It was dissolved by the National Electoral Institute (INE) in its 2017 redistricting process because the state's population no longer warranted 21 districts.

== District territory ==
Evolution of electoral district numbers
| | 1974 | 1978 | 1996 | 2005 | 2017 | 2023 |
|---|---|---|---|---|---|---|
| Veracruz | 15 | 23 | 23 | 21 | 20 | 19 |
| Chamber of Deputies | 196 | 300 | | | | |

2005–2017

In its final form, the 21st district's head town (cabecera distrital), where results from individual polling stations were gathered together and tallied, was the city of Cosoleacaque. It covered 11 municipalities in the state's southernmost Olmeca region:
- Cosoleacaque, Chinameca, Hueyapan de Ocampo, Jáltipan, Mecayapan, Oluta, Oteapan, Pajapan, Soconusco, Soteapan, Texistepec, Tatahuicapan de Juárez and Zaragoza.

1996–2005

Under the 1996 districting plan, the head town was at Cosoleacaque and the district covered 11 municipalities.

1978–1996

The districting scheme in force from 1978 to 1996 was the result of the 1977 electoral reforms, which increased the number of single-member seats in the Chamber of Deputies from 196 to 300. Under that plan, Veracruz's seat allocation rose from 15 to 23. The newly created 21st district had its head town at the city of Veracruz, and it covered a part of the city and the rural areas of the municipality of Veracruz.

== Deputies returned to Congress ==
(Mexico) National parties
- Current
- PAN
- PRI
- PT
- PVEM
- MC
- Morena
- PAZ
- Somos
- Defunct or local only
- PLM
- PNR
- PRM
- PNM
- PP
- PPS
- PARM
- PFCRN
- CON
- PANAL
- PSD
- PES
- PES
- PRD

Veracruz's 21st district
| Election | Deputy | Party | Term | Legislature |
|---|---|---|---|---|
| 1979 | Carolina Hernández Pinzón | Institutional Revolutionary Party | 1979–1982 | 51st Congress |
| 1982 | Amador Toca Cangas | Institutional Revolutionary Party | 1982–1985 | 52nd Congress |
| 1985 | Rafael García Anaya | Institutional Revolutionary Party | 1985–1988 | 53rd Congress |
| 1988 | Américo Javier Flores Nava | Institutional Revolutionary Party | 1988–1991 | 54th Congress |
| 1991 | Ramón Ferrari Pardiño | Institutional Revolutionary Party | 1991–1994 | 55th Congress |
| 1994 | Fernando Flores Gómez | Institutional Revolutionary Party | 1994–1997 | 56th Congress |
| 1997 | Gabriel Alfonso Andrade Rosas (Note: Andrade Rosas took a leave of absence from December 1998 to August 1999 and then resigned his seat on 7 September 1999.); Martha Elena Ortiz Guerrero | Institutional Revolutionary Party | 1997–2000 | 57th Congress |
| 2000 | José María Guillén Torres | Institutional Revolutionary Party | 2000–2003 | 58th Congress |
| 2003 | José Jesús Vázquez González | National Action Party (Mexico) | 2003–2006 | 59th Congress |
| 2006 | Juan Darío Lemarroy Martínez | Party of the Democratic Revolution | 2006–2009 | 60th Congress |
| 2009 | Antonio Benítez Lucho | Institutional Revolutionary Party | 2009–2012 | 61st Congress |
| 2012 | Ponciano Vázquez Parissi | Institutional Revolutionary Party | 2012–2015 | 62nd Congress |
| 2015 | Cirilo Vázquez Parissi (Note: Vázquez Parissi resigned his seat on 17 February 2017.); Victorino Cruz Campos (Note: Cruz Campos sat with the PVEM for two weeks in Aug/Sep 2017 before returning to the PRI.) | Institutional Revolutionary Party | 2015–2018 | 63rd Congress |
