= Rasgado =

Rasgado may refer to:

== People ==
- Gloria Rasgado Corsi (born 1955), Mexican politician
- Jesús Rasgado (1907–1948), Mexican singer-songwriter
- Victor Rasgado (born 1959), Mexican pianist and classical composer

== Other ==
- Pecado Rasgado, Brazilian telenovela
