= Noé Hernández González =

Mexican politician (born 1965)

- Born: 31 May 1965 (age 61); Minatitlán, Veracruz, Mexico
- Education: Universidad Veracruzana
- Occupation: Politician
- Political party: PRI

Noé Hernández González (born 31 May 1965) is a Mexican politician affiliated with the Institutional Revolutionary Party (PRI). In the 2012 general election he was elected to the Chamber of Deputies to represent Veracruz's 14th district during the 62nd session of Congress.
