= Geo Meneses =

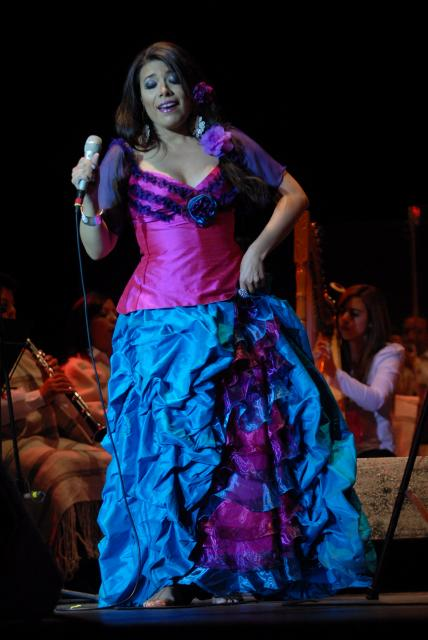

Background information
- Birth name: Georgina Meneses
- Also known as: GEO
- Born: 22 March 1974 (age 51)
- Origin: Oaxaca, Mexico
- Genres: World Music
- Website: Web Page

Georgina "Geo" Meneses (born 22 March 1974 in Oaxaca City, Mexico) is a Mexican producer and singer of traditional music and world music genre.

Georgina Meneses was born in Oaxaca City, the daughter of Linda Meneses and Eulogio Garcia, from a very early showed an aptitude for music especially for singing at the age of 10 years She began her musical education studying piano and later decided to devote professional singing.

She has taken her song to important stages of Mexico, including the "International Cervantino Festival" and the festival "Ollin Kan". Abroad she has performed in cities such as Madrid, Seville, Aranjuez, Huelva, Santiago de Compostela and Barcelona (Spain), Bergamo, Florence and Milan (Italy), Paris (France), Berlin (Germany) and Manila (Philippines) and in various forums in Central and South America. Meneses has rescued many traditional songs that had practically been forgotten and has performed songs by composers such as Álvaro Carrillo, Jesus Rasgado and Tata Nacho. Making mergers of traditional and modern for what she has achieved placed her with great acceptance among the public taste.

== Discography ==
- 1998 Por que Así Tenia que Ser
- 2000 Hasta Hoy Estoy Contigo
- 2001 Ausencia
- 2003 Álvaro Carrillo
- 2006 Tö'k Ajj Tö'k Joot (Con Todo el Corazón)
- 2007 Amuleto Contra el Mal de Amores
- 2008 Dosis de Placer
