= Guízar =

Guízar is a surname. Notable people with the surname include:

- Gonzálo Guízar (born 1961), Mexican politician
- Pepe Guízar (1906–1980), Mexican composer, poet, and musician
- Rafael Guízar y Valencia (1878–1938), Mexican saint
- Tito Guízar (1908–1999), Mexican singer and actor
