= Medel (surname) =

Medel is a Spanish surname. Notable people with the surname include:

- Anthony Medel (born 1978), American beach volleyball player
- Braulio Medel Cámara (born 1947), Spanish businessman
- Elena Medel (born 1985), Spanish poet
- José Medel (1938–2001), Mexican boxer
- Gary Medel (born 1987), Chilean footballer
- Lorenzo Medel, Filipino pianist
- Marco Medel (born 1989), Chilean footballer
- Pedro Medel (born 1991), Cuban swimmer
