= Rocío Nahle =

Mexican politician and engineer (born 1964)

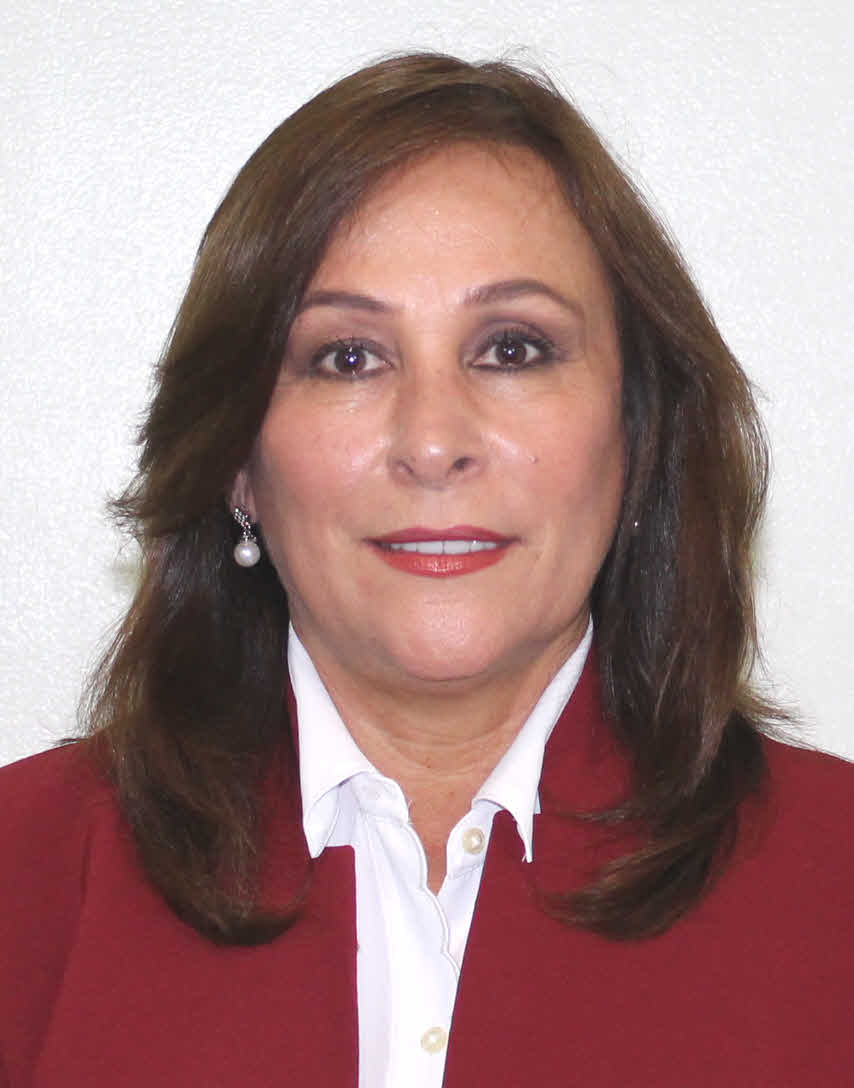

Governor of Veracruz
- Incumbent
- Assumed office 1 December 2024
- Preceded by: Cuitláhuac García Jiménez

Secretary of Energy
- In office 1 December 2018 – 13 October 2023
- President: Andrés Manuel López Obrador
- Preceded by: Pedro Joaquín Coldwell
- Succeeded by: Miguel Ángel Maciel Torres

Member of the Chamber of Deputies for Veracruz's 11th district
- In office 1 September 2015 – 31 August 2018
- Preceded by: Patricia Guadalupe Peña Recio
- Succeeded by: Flora Tania Cruz Santos

Senator for Veracruz
- In office 1 September 2018 – 27 November 2018 Serving with Ricardo Ahued and Julen Rementería del Puerto
- Preceded by: Ainara Rementería Coello
- Succeeded by: Gloria Sánchez Hernández

Personal details
- Born: 14 April 1964 (age 62) Río Grande, Zacatecas, Mexico
- Party: National Regeneration Movement (since 2015); Party of the Democratic Revolution (2007-2015)
- Education: Autonomous University of Zacatecas

Norma Rocío Nahle García (Note: In this Mexican name, the surname is Nahle and the second or maternal family name is García.) (born 14 April 1964) is a Mexican politician and petrochemical engineer, and a member of the National Regeneration Movement (Morena). Currently serving as governor of Veracruz, she was the secretary of energy in the government of President Andrés Manuel López Obrador from 2018 to 2023; previously, she was a federal deputy for the 11th district of Veracruz, based in Coatzacoalcos, and coordinator of her party's parliamentary group in the Chamber of Deputies.

After winning the 2024 election, she was sworn in as the first woman governor of Veracruz on 1 December the same year.

== Professional career ==
Nahle holds a degree in chemical engineering from the Autonomous University of Zacatecas (UAZ), where she completed her undergraduate studies between 1981 and 1986; she subsequently earned a specialization in petrochemistry from the same university.

She also completed a diploma in chemical process engineering from the National Autonomous University of Mexico (UNAM) and a diploma in economic viability in industrial processes from the Veracruzana University.

== Political career ==
In 2012, she ran as a candidate for federal deputy in the 11th electoral district of Veracruz under the coalition formed by the Party of the Democratic Revolution (PRD), the Labor Party (PT), and Citizens' Movement (MC). She was defeated by Joaquín Caballero Rosiñol of a PRI–PVEM coalition.

=== Federal deputy (2015–2018) ===
In 2015, she was elected federal deputy for the 11th district of Veracruz and served as coordinator of the Morena parliamentary group in the Chamber of Deputies.

=== Senator for Veracruz (2018) ===
In the 2018 federal elections, she was nominated as a candidate for the Senate of Mexico by the National Regeneration Movement (Morena) as the lead candidate with Ricardo Ahued Bardahuil for the state of Veracruz. She won the seat by the principle of relative majority with 48% of the vote. She assumed office in the 64th legislature of the Congress of the Union on 1 September 2018, serving until 27 November of that same year.

=== Secretary of Energy (2018–2023) ===
In 2018, she was appointed secretary of energy by President Andrés Manuel López Obrador, a position held until she resigned in October 2023 in order to run for governor of Veracruz.

=== Governor of Veracruz ===
Nahle assumed office as the first woman governor of Veracruz on 1 December 2024 after winning the 2 June election.
