= Leandro García Bringas =

Mexican politician

Leandro Rafael García Bringas
- Born: 24 November 1951 (age 74); Coatzacoalcos, Veracruz, Mexico
- Occupation: Politician
- Political party: PRI

Leandro Rafael García Bringas (born 24 November 1951) is a Mexican politician who has been affiliated with both the National Action Party (PAN) and the Institutional Revolutionary Party (PRI).

He served as the municipal president of Coatzacoalcos in 1994. In the 2009 mid-terms he was elected to the Chamber of Deputies to represent the 11th district of Veracruz for the PAN during the 61st session of Congress.

In the 2015 election he sought re-election to the 11th district seat as the candidate of the PRI, but lost to Rocío Nahle García of the National Regeneration Movement (Morena).
