= Roque Gracia Sánchez =

Mexican politician

- Born: 2 January 1951 (age 75); Minatitlán, Veracruz, Mexico
- Occupation: Politician
- Political party: PRI

Roque Joaquín Gracia Sánchez (born 2 January 1951) is a Mexican politician from the Institutional Revolutionary Party (PRI). In the 2000 general election he was elected to the Chamber of Deputies to represent Veracruz's 23rd district during the 58th session of Congress
