= Luis Antonio Martínez =

Luis Antonio Martínez may refer to

- Luis Martínez (footballer, born 1987) (Luis Antonio Martínez Jiménez), Mexican footballer
- Luis Antonio Martínez Armengol (born 1952), Mexican politician
