= Jessica Ramírez =

Jessica Ramírez may refer to:

- Jessica Ramirez, Puerto Rican attorney and politician, member of the New Jersey General Assembly
- Jessica Ramírez Cisneros (born 1985), Mexican politician from Veracruz
- Yessica Ramírez Meza, Mexican beauty queen, competed in Miss International in 2004
