= Antonio Benítez =

Antonio Benítez may refer to:

- Antonio J. Benítez (1903–1992), Argentine politician
- Antonio Benítez-Rojo (1931–2005), Cuban writer
- Antonio Benítez (footballer, born 1942) (1942–2022), Spanish footballer and manager
- Antonio Benítez (footballer, born 1951) (1951–2014), Spanish footballer
- Antonio Benítez Lucho (born 1955), Mexican politician
