= General González =

General González may refer to:

- Abraham González (general) (1782–c. 1838), Argentine general
- Juan Picasso González (1857–1935), Spanish general
- Lázaro Chacón González (1873–1931), Guatemalan general
- Miguel Alemán González (1884–1929), Mexican general
- Romualdo Palacio González (1827–1908), Spanish general

== See also ==
- Ambrosio José Gonzales (1818–1893), Cuban revolutionary general
