= Pablo Pavón Vinales =

Mexican trade unionist and politician

- Born: 27 August 1945 (age 80); Minatitlán, Veracruz, Mexico
- Occupations: Trade union leader and politician
- Political party: PRI

Pablo Pavón Vinales (born 27 August 1945) is a Mexican trade union leader and politician affiliated with the Institutional Revolutionary Party (PRI).

Pavón Vinales was born in Minatitlán, Veracruz. He served in the Chamber of Deputies twice: during the 55th session of Congress (1991–1994), for Veracruz's 14th district, and during the 59th session (2003–2006), for Veracruz's 23rd district. He had previously served as a local deputy in the Congress of Veracruz from 1991 to 1994. He also served as municipal president of Minatitlán, Veracruz, from 1982 to 1985 and 2001 to 2003.
