= Tucson Mexican All-Stars =

Minor League Baseball team (1998 to 2000)

Mexican All-Stars
- 1998–2000; Tucson, Arizona

Minor league affiliations
- Previous classes: Rookie
- League: Arizona Rookie League
- Division: Southern (2000)

Team data
- Previous parks: Tucson Electric Park

The Tucson Mexican All-Stars team was an Arizona League baseball team based in Tucson, Arizona, made up of developmental players from the Mexican League. It played from 1998 to 2000 at the Tucson Electric Park spring training complex.

The team consisted of 19-and-under Mexican League academy players. Most players remained within leagues in Mexico with a few playing the minor leagues (from Rookie to Triple A) in the United States. None have advanced to the MLB.

== Year-by-year record ==
Year	Record	Finish	Manager	Playoffs
1998	22–33	7th	Abelardo Vega	Did not qualify 19.5 games back
1999	28–28	4th	Jose Ortiz	Did not qualify 11 games back
2000	23–32	3rd	Jose Ortiz	Did not qualify 12.5 games back
