= Minatitlán massacre =

2019 mass shooting in Veracruz, Mexico

- Location: 17.9833°N 94.55°W; Minatitlán, Veracruz, Mexico
- Date: 19 April 2019; 9:00 p.m.–10:00 p.m.
- Attack type: Mass shooting
- Deaths: 14
- Injuries: 2
- Perpetrator: Jalisco New Generation Cartel

On the night of 19 April 2019, 14 people were killed, including a one-year-old baby, while they were celebrating a birthday party for a 52-year-old woman in Minatitlán, Veracruz, Mexico. The assailants asked for "La Becky", the manager of a gay bar in Minatitlán and they started shooting.

The state Secretary of Public Security, Hugo Gutiérrez, said that some of the participants in the attack had been identified and a search was under way. Investigators believe the shootout was a result of a turf war between the Jalisco New Generation Cartel (CJNG) and Los Zetas, two major criminal groups that operate in Veracruz. La Becky was paying protection to Los Zetas.

== Events ==
At 9 pm, three men broke into a woman's 52-year birthday celebration in Minatitlán. Asking for "La Becky", they began shooting people at the party, among them a one-year-old infant. The sister of the woman whose birthday was celebrated said, "It was my sister's birthday, she was 52, I was coming from the bathroom when the thundering began, I did not see how many they were because I did not leave. I lost my son, my only son, and you can imagine the pain I have, to see my only son dead. I'm standing here, with my pain, because you can not say anything else, he was 32 years old."

A majority of the attendees were women, including seniors. The older adults dancing were pointed at with weapons. "Yes, they killed several old ladies", indicated a surviving woman. "I do not know how many they were, what I did was to throw myself under the table, they pointed me out, but I entrusted myself to God and said: Forgive me, Lord, and let your will be done. It seemed eternal to me, I thought it was not going to end. We were like 50, we were all ladies."

One of the victims was a one-year-old baby who was repeatedly shot after he fell to the ground. According to a survivor's testimony, "I said, 'it was one bullet', but it was a bullet spray because they were dead and they were still giving it to the baby. They kept shooting at him, they shot him in his little heart, how they could not realize if the mother was carrying him. The mother was also shot, I think the father wanted to cover him, but they hit him in the face." The mother of the baby was hospitalized; so far she is the only member of that family that survived the attack.

Besides killing more than a dozen people, the armed group psychologically tortured those who survived, forcing them to observe how they shot other people. One testimony said, "Those who were crouched were told to turn to see the dead, then they were shot again, to look at them, to look at them and they told you to turn around. I think they were looking for someone, they were pointing at your head or your back with long weapons."

== Reactions ==
Through social media, the governor of the state, Cuitláhuac García Jiménez, reported that an emergency meeting was held due to the shooting. An operation was activated to find those responsible and at the same time it was assured that there would be no impunity, despite the criticisms to the State Attorney General's Office investigations of being "eternal". For its part, the federal Secretariat of Security and Civilian Protection said they were supporting the state agencies, deploying an operation to search and capture those responsible.

Several citizens criticized the attitude of President Andrés Manuel López Obrador, accusing him of not responding in a timely manner for the shooting. After former presidential candidate José Antonio Meade called for the criminals to be punished and the families of the victims to be certain of an investigation, his comments generated diverse reactions after social media contrasted them with President López Obrador, who was criticized for not commenting on the shooting during the hours after the event. After posting a tweet shortly after the shooting where he attacked his political opponents, several citizens began to organize protests demanding his resignation. As a result, the hashtag "#AMLORENUNCIA" ("AMLO resignation" or "Resign AMLO") became trending topic on Twitter.

Former presidents Vicente Fox and Felipe Calderón also criticized the president's attitude, with Calderón blaming López Obrador's "corrupt regime" for the insecurity that led to the shooting, and Fox responding to López Obrador's tweet against his political opponents saying "What a shame that even tragedies are used by you as a springboard for aggression. It's not all about you, AMLO. To speak about the people does not mean to govern them, but to take care of them. No more violence! #Minatitlan".
