= Patricia Peña Recio =

Mexican politician

- Born: 28 December 1977 (age 48); Coatzacoalcos, Veracruz, Mexico
- Occupation: Deputy
- Political party: PRI
- Website: http://patriciapenarecio.com/

Patricia Guadalupe Peña Recio (born 28 December 1977) is a Mexican politician affiliated with the Institutional Revolutionary Party (PRI). In 2013–2015 she served in the Chamber of Deputies during the 62nd Congress representing Veracruz's 11th district as the substitute of Joaquín Caballero Rosiñol.
