= José Jesús Vázquez González =

Mexican politician

- Born: 4 April 1977 (age 49); Veracruz, Mexico
- Occupation: Politician
- Political party: PAN

José Jesús Vázquez González (born 4 April 1977) is a Mexican politician affiliated with the National Action Party (PAN). In the 2003 mid-terms he was elected to the Chamber of Deputies to represent Veracruz's 21st district during the 59th Congress.
