= Roe Skidmore =

American baseball player (born 1945)

- Pinch hitter
- Born: October 30, 1945 (age 79); Decatur, Illinois, U.S.
- Batted: Right Threw: Right

MLB debut
- September 17, 1970, for the Chicago Cubs

Last MLB appearance
- September 17, 1970, for the Chicago Cubs

MLB statistics
- Batting average: 1.000
- At bats: 1
- Hits: 1
- Stats at Baseball Reference

Teams
- Chicago Cubs (1970)

Robert Roe Skidmore (born October 30, 1945) is an American former professional baseball player and one of the few players in Major League Baseball history with a perfect career batting average of 1.000.

An outfielder and first baseman, he had a ten-year, 1,289-game career (1966–1975) in minor league baseball, but made only one Major League appearance as a pinch hitter for the 1970 Chicago Cubs. He threw and batted right-handed, stood 6 feet 3 inches (1.91 m) tall and weighed 188 pounds (85 kg).

Skidmore had split the 1970 season between the Cubs' two top farm clubs, the San Antonio Missions and the Tacoma Cubs, before his late-season trial in the Majors. On September 17, 1970, during a 9–2 loss to the St. Louis Cardinals at Wrigley Field, he pinch hit for Joe Decker in the seventh inning and singled off Cardinal left-hander Jerry Reuss. He was then retired on a force out. It was Skidmore's only Major League at bat. He was traded along with Dave Lemonds and Pat Jacquez by the Cubs to the Chicago White Sox for Ossie Blanco and José Ortiz on November 30, 1970.

Roe attended Eisenhower High School in Decatur, Illinois.
