= Abel Ignacio Cuevas Melo =

Mexican politician (1965–2023)

- Born: 28 March 1965; Coatepec, Veracruz, Mexico
- Died: 13 November 2023 (aged 58)
- Education: UDLAP
- Occupation: Politician
- Political party: PAN party

Abel Ignacio Cuevas Melo (28 March 1965 – 13 November 2023) was a Mexican politician from the National Action Party (PAN).

He served in the Chamber of Deputies twice: during the 58th session of Congress, representing the 11th district of Veracruz, and during the 60th session, as a plurinominal deputy for the third region.

Cuevas Melo died on 13 November 2023, at the age of 58.
