= Robinson Uscanga Cruz =

Mexican politician

- Born: 20 February 1962 (age 64); Veracruz, Mexico
- Occupation: Politician
- Political party: MC

Robinson Uscanga Cruz (born 3 January 1953) is a Mexican politician from the Citizens' Movement. In the 2006 general election he was elected to the Chamber of Deputies to represent Veracruz's 14th district during the 60th session of Congress.
