= Parque 18 de marzo de 1938 =

Stadium in Minatitlán, Veracruz, Mexico

- Interactive map of Parque 18 de marzo de 1938
- Full name: Parque deportivo 18 de marzo de 1938
- Location: Minatitlán, Veracruz, Mexico
- Coordinates: 17°59′43.2″N 94°32′32.7″W
- Capacity: 7,500
- Surface: Grass
- Field size: Left Field: 315 feet (96 m); Center Field: 400 feet (120 m); Right Field: 315 feet (96 m)

Construction
- Opened: March 1992

Tenants
- Petroleros de Minatitlán (1992–1995); Potros de Minatitlán (Colts) (1996–1998); Petroleros de Minatitlán (2007–2013) (LMB); Gavilanes de Minatitlán (VWL)

Parque 18 de marzo de 1938 is a stadium in Minatitlán, Veracruz. It is the home field of the Gavilanes de Minatitlán (Minatitlán Hawks) who play in the Veracruz Winter League. It holds 7,500 people. It was previously home to the Petroleros de Minatitlán (Minatitlán Oilers) Mexican League baseball team. It is named to commemorate the day when President of Mexico Lázaro Cárdenas announced that the oil industry in Mexico would be nationalized.

The stadium was the site of a rare triple play on 23 April 2007 when the Petroleros were at home defending against the Olmecas de Tabasco.
