= Miguel Alemán González =

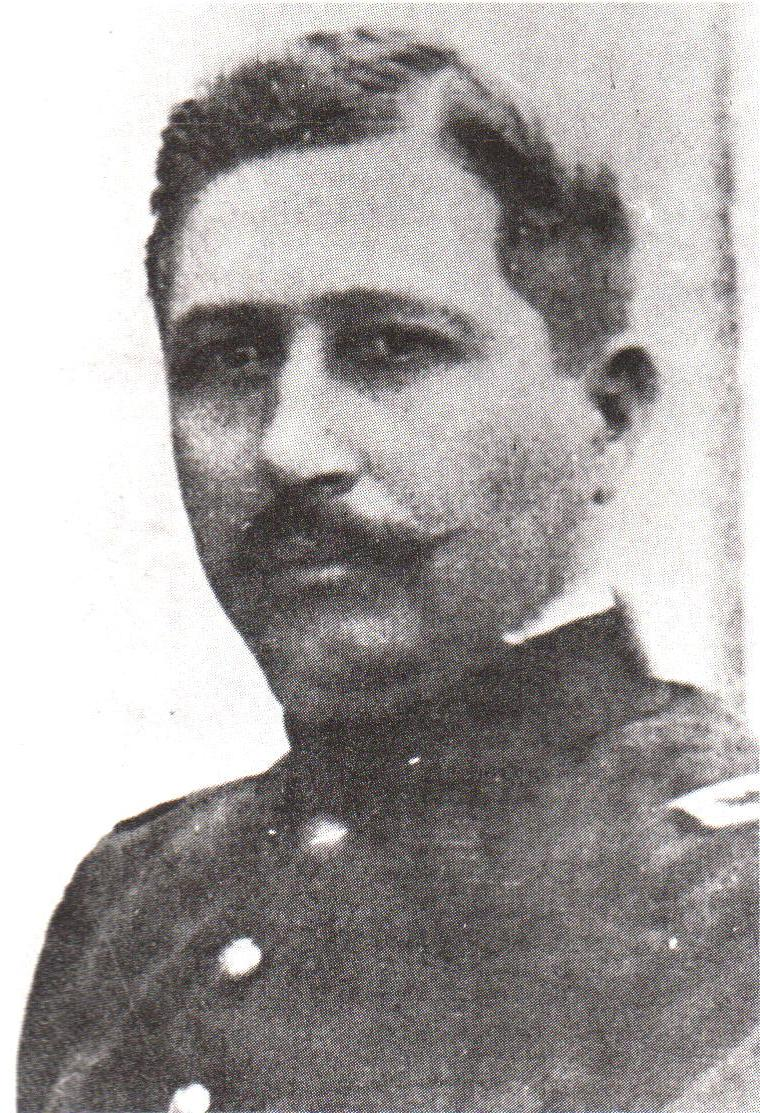
- Born: 1884; Acayucan, Veracruz, Mexico
- Died: March 20, 1929 (aged 44–45); San Juan Evangelista, Veracruz, Mexico
- Cause of death: suicide or burnt alive during battle
- Resting place: Sayula de Alemán, Veracruz, Mexico
- Occupation: General
- Spouse: Tomasa Valdés Ledezma
- Children: Miguel Alemán Valdés
- Relatives: Miguel Alemán Velasco (grandson)

Miguel Alemán González (1884 – March 20, 1929) was a Mexican general who served in the Mexican Revolution.

== Early life ==
Miguel Alemán González was born in 1884.

== Military career ==
Alemán González was a pioneer of the Mexican Revolution in the state of Veracruz.

Alemán González took up arms again in 1927. He spearheaded a movement of armed resistance against presidents Álvaro Obregón and Plutarco Elías Calles.

== Death and legacy ==
Alemán González died on March 20, 1929, in San Juan Evangelista. He either committed suicide, or he was burned alive as General Miguel Acosta set fire to the forest where he was hiding during a battle. He was buried in Sayula de Alemán on March 25, 1937.

His son, Miguel Alemán Valdés, served as the 46th President of Mexico from 1946 to 1952.
