= Jessica Ramírez Cisneros =

Mexican politician from Veracruz (born 1985)

Jessica Ramírez Cisneros (Note: In this Mexican name, the surname is Ramírez and the second or maternal family name is Cisneros.) (born 10 July 1985) is a Mexican politician from the state of Veracruz. As a member of the National Regeneration Movement (Morena), she has sat in both the Congress of Veracruz and the federal Chamber of Deputies.

Jessica Ramírez Cisneros was born in 1985 in Minatitlán, Veracruz, where she later earned a bachelor's degree in business management from the Instituto Tecnológico de Minatitlán.

Between 2018 and 2024 she served two consecutive terms as a local deputy in the Congress of Veracruz, representing Minatitlán. On 30 July 2022, she was briefly taken into custody by the municipal police for creating a disturbance during Morena's internal elections in Minatitlán; Sergio Gutiérrez Luna, at the time president of the Chamber of Deputies, visited her during her detention.

In the 2024 general election, with 73.8% of the valid votes in a three-horse race, she was elected to the Chamber of Deputies to represent Veracruz's 14th district (Minatitlán and eight neighbouring municipalities) during the 66th session of Congress.

On 25 March 2025, she voted against rescinding the parliamentary immunity (desafuero) of Morena deputy Cuauhtémoc Blanco and, instead, asked him to sign a Club América football shirt.
