= Juan Darío Lemarroy Martínez =

Mexican politician

- Born: 2 December 1971 (age 54); Veracruz, Mexico
- Occupation: Politician
- Political party: PRD

Juan Darío Lemarroy Martínez (born 2 December 1971) is a Mexican politician from the Party of the Democratic Revolution (PRD). In the 2006 general election he was elected to the Chamber of Deputies to represent Veracruz's 21st district during the 60th Congress.
