= Martín Vidaña Pérez =

Mexican politician

- Born: 21 November 1962 (age 63); Veracruz, Mexico
- Occupation: Politician
- Political party: PRI

Martín Remigio Vidaña Pérez (born 21 November 1962) is a Mexican politician affiliated with the Institutional Revolutionary Party (PRI). In the 2003 mid-terms he was elected to the Chamber of Deputies to represent Veracruz's 14th district during the 59th session of Congress.
