= Palma (name) =

Palma is both a surname and a given name of Italian origin. Notable people with the name include:

- Palma Vecchio (c. 1480–1528), Italian painter
- Palma il Giovane (1548/50–1628), Italian painter
- Adalberto Palma (born 1981), Mexican football player
- Adiel Palma (born 1970), Cuban baseball player
- Alejandra Palma (born 1960), Argentine field hockey player
- Andrea Palma (architect) (1644/64–1730), Italian architect
- Andrea Palma (actress) (1903–1987), Mexican actress
- Angélica Palma (1878–1935), Peruvian writer
- Annabel Palma, American politician
- Armando Contreras Palma (born 1947), Salvadoran football manager
- Arturo Alessandri Palma (1868–1950), Chilean political figure
- Belita Palma (1932–1988), Angolan singer
- Brian De Palma (born 1940), American film director and writer
- Carlo Di Palma (1925–2004), Italian cinematographer
- Cecilia Muñoz-Palma (1913–2006), Filipino jurist
- Clemente Palma (1872–1946), Peruvian writer and critic
- Dalila Palma (born 1999), Cuban volleyball player
- Donald Palma, American double bassist, conductor and instructor
- Emilio Palma (born 1978), Argentine national born in Antarctica
- Enrique Tortosa Palma (born 1991), Spanish footballer
- Esteban de Palma (born 1967), Argentinian volleyball player
- Ever Palma (born 1992), Mexican racewalker
- Félix J. Palma, Spanish author
- Fernando Palma (born 1993), Honduran diplomat, actor, model
- Gustavo Adolfo Palma (1920–2009), Guatemalan singer and actor
- Héctor Luis Palma Salazar (born 1960), Mexican drug trafficker
- Isaac Palma (born 1990), Mexican racewalker
- Joe Palma (1905–1994), American actor
- Jorge Palma (born 1950), Portuguese singer and songwriter
- José Palma (1876–1903), Filipino poet and soldier
- José Ignacio Palma (1910–1988), Chilean engineer and politician
- José Joaquín Palma (1844–1911), Cuban revolutionary and poet
- José Luis Di Palma (born 1966), Argentine racing driver
- Jose S. Palma (born 1950), Filipino prelate, current Archbishop emeritus of Cebu
- Joseph-François Charpentier de Cossigny de Palma (1736–1809), French engineer and explorer
- Jula de Palma (born 1932), Italian singer
- Laura Palma, Mexican actress and model
- Leticia Palma (1926–2009), Mexican actress
- Luis González Palma (born 1957), Guatemalan photographer
- Manuel Solís Palma (1917–2009), Panamanian politician
- Marcelo Palma (born 1966), Brazilian racewalker
- Mário Palma (born 1950), Portuguese basketball coach
- Mario Alberto Molina Palma (born 1948), Panama-born archbishop of Guatemala
- Master of San Martino alla Palma (fl. 14th century), Florentine painter
- Michael Palma (born 1945), American poet and translator
- Milagros Palma (born 1973), Cuban fencer
- Francesco Nitto Palma (born 1950), Italian politician
- Odelmys Palma (born 1971), Cuban javelin thrower
- Omar Palma (born 1958), Argentine football player
- Patricio Di Palma (born 1971), Argentine racing driver
- Paulo da Palma (born 1965), German-born Portuguese football player
- Piero de Palma (1925–2013), Italian singer
- Precioso Palma, Filipino novelist and playwright
- Rafael Palma (1874–1939), Filipino politician, writer, educator and mason
- Raúl Palma (born 1950), Mexican basketball player
- Ricardo Palma (1833–1919), Peruvian author, scholar, librarian and politician
- Rossy de Palma (born 1964), Spanish actress and model
- Ruben Palma (born 1954), Chilean-born Danish writer
- Rubén Luis di Palma (1944–2000), Argentine racing driver
- Samuel De Palma (1918–2002), American diplomat
- Silvestro Palma (1754–1834), Italian composer
- Sylvester Romero Palma, bishop of Belize
- Tina Monzon-Palma (born 1951), Filipino news anchor
- Tomás Estrada Palma (1832–1908), Cuban political figure
