= Pat Jacquez =

American baseball player (born 1947)

- Pitcher
- Born: April 23, 1947 (age 79); Stockton, California, U.S.
- Batted: Right Threw: Right

MLB debut
- April 18, 1971, for the Chicago White Sox

Last MLB appearance
- April 25, 1971, for the Chicago White Sox

MLB statistics
- Win–loss record: 0–0
- Earned run average: 4.50
- Strikeouts: 1
- Stats at Baseball Reference

Teams
- Chicago White Sox (1971)

Patrick Thomas Jacquez (born April 23, 1947) is a former right-handed pitcher who played for the Chicago White Sox in 1971. Jacquez only pitched in two games in his major league career. He was drafted in 1967 by the Chicago Cubs and played for the minor-league Lodi Crushers, San Antonio Missions, and Tacoma Cubs. He was traded along with Dave Lemonds and Roe Skidmore by the Cubs to the White Sox for Ossie Blanco and José Ortiz on November 30, 1970. Jacquez debuted on April 18, 1971, in the first game of a doubleheader against the Oakland Athletics; he pitched for 1.2 innings and gave up four hits and a run. His second and final game was on April 25, 1971, against the Boston Red Sox. He pitched 0.1 innings in this game and only faced one batter. Jacquez was demoted to the Tucson Toros for the remainder of the 1971 season. Jacquez played for the Indianapolis Indians, a minor-league team in the Cincinnati Reds farm system, in 1972. Before leaving pro baseball, he was sent from the Reds to the St. Louis Cardinals for Bill Voss at the Winter Meetings on November 27, 1972.
