= Miguel Ángel Maciel Torres =

Politician and petroleum engineer

Secretary of Energy
- In office 16 October 2023 – 30 September 2024
- President: Andrés Manuel López Obrador
- Preceded by: Rocío Nahle
- Succeeded by: Luz Elena González Escobar

Personal details
- Born: February 9, 1960 (age 66) Valle de Santiago (Mexico)
- Education: Instituto Politécnico Nacional
- Alma mater: Universidad Nacional Autónoma de México
- Occupation: Petroleum engineering and Politician

Miguel Ángel Maciel Torres (born February 9, 1960) is a Mexican petroleum engineer and politician. He was Secretary of Energy from 2023 to 2024 during the government of Andrés Manuel López Obrador.

== Biography ==
Miguel Ángel Maciel Torres was born in Valle de Santiago, Guanajuato, in 1960. He studied petroleum engineering at the National Polytechnic Institute (IPN) and a master's degree in the same specialty at the National Autonomous University of Mexico (UNAM). He is a member of the College of Petroleum Engineers of Mexico (CIPM), the Association of Petroleum Engineers of Mexico (AIPM) and the Society of Petroleum Engineers (SPE).

He worked for Petróleos Mexicanos (PEMEX) for thirty-two years in its exploration and production division. Among his responsibilities were the management of the Burgos integrated project and the management of the Lakach development project. He retired in 2017.

On January 1, 2019, he joined Andrés Manuel López Obrador's cabinet as Undersecretary of Hydrocarbons under the supervision of Secretary of Energy Rocío Nahle. On October 16, 2023, he was appointed Secretary of Energy by President López Obrador following Nahle's resignation.
