= Ossie Blanco =

Venezuelan baseball player (1945–2026)

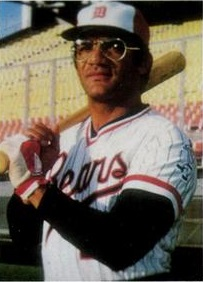
- First baseman
- Born: September 8, 1945; Caracas, Venezuela
- Died: July 23, 2026 (aged 80)
- Batted: Right Threw: Right

MLB debut
- May 26, 1970, for the Chicago White Sox

Last MLB appearance
- June 9, 1974, for the Cleveland Indians

MLB statistics
- Batting average: .196
- At-bats: 102
- Hits: 20
- Stats at Baseball Reference

Teams
- Chicago White Sox (1970); Cleveland Indians (1974)

Member of the Venezuelan

Baseball Hall of Fame
- Induction: 2015

Oswaldo Carlos Blanco Díaz (September 8, 1945 – July 23, 2026) was a Venezuelan professional baseball first baseman. He played in Major League Baseball (MLB) for the Chicago White Sox and Cleveland Indians. He batted and threw right-handed.

== Biography ==
Blanco posted a .196 batting average in 52 games for the Chicago White Sox in 1970 and the Cleveland Indians in 1974. He was traded along with José Ortiz by the White Sox to the Chicago Cubs for Dave Lemonds, Roe Skidmore and Pat Jacquez on November 30, 1970.

In 2015, he was enshrined into the Venezuelan Baseball Hall of Fame and Museum.

Blanco died on July 23, 2026, at the age of 80.

== See also ==
- List of players from Venezuela in Major League Baseball
