= Ponciano Vázquez Parissi =

Mexican politician

- Born: 29 October 1983 (age 42); Córdoba, Veracruz, Mexico
- Occupation: Deputy
- Political party: PRI

Ponciano Vázquez Parissi (born 29 October 1983) is a Mexican politician affiliated with the Institutional Revolutionary Party (PRI). In the 2012 general election he was elected to the Chamber of Deputies to represent Veracruz's 21st district during the 62nd Congress.
