= Amuleto Contra el Mal de Amores =

Studio album by GEO Meneses
- Released: March 2007 (Mexico)
- Recorded: 2006–2007
- Genre: World Music, Traditional
- Label: Georgina Meneses Productions

GEO Meneses chronology
| Con Todo el Corazón (2006) | Amuleto Contra el Mal de Amores (2007) | Dosis de Placer (2008) |

Singles from Amuleto Contra el Mal de Amores
- 1. "Serenata sin Luna" Released: March 2007; 2. "Amuleto" Released: April 2007

Amulet is the sixth studio release by the Mexican singer Geo Meneses produced by Meneses and Pepe Torres. It was released in Mexico in March 2007.

== Musical concept ==
This production blends a contemporary vision of traditional and alternative music, the result of a personal search for his interpreter. The arrangements on this album are subtle and original as soft and loud sounds generated in this production Meneses makes full use of their vocal powers printing on new shades songs never heard before in the traditional Mexican music.

This disc contains 13 songs by both contemporary composers such as Maria Greever, Mario Ruiz, Alfonso Esparza, and authors of the past embodied in the Mexican music such as Álvaro Carrillo, José Alfredo Jiménez, Tata Nacho, Predro Galindo, and Elpidio Ramírez.

== Album ==
=== Tracks ===
- 1.- Serenata sin luna.
- 2.- El amuleto.
- 3.- Tú solo tú.
- 4.- No vuelvo a amar.
- 5.- Ausente.
- 6.- Júrame.
- 7.- La malagueña salerosa.
- 8.- El cascabel.
- 9.- Alma mía.
- 10.- Luz de luna.
- 11.- El otoño.
- 12.- La cigarra.
- 13.- Ni mentira ni verdad.
