= José Ortiz (outfielder) =

Puerto Rican baseball player (1947–2011)

- Outfielder
- Born: June 25, 1947; Ponce, Puerto Rico
- Died: January 20, 2011 (aged 63); Yabucoa, Puerto Rico
- Batted: Right Threw: Right

MLB debut
- September 4, 1969, for the Chicago White Sox

Last MLB appearance
- June 16, 1971, for the Chicago Cubs

MLB statistics
- Batting average: .301
- Home runs: 0
- Runs batted in: 6
- Stats at Baseball Reference

Teams
- Chicago White Sox (1969–1970); Chicago Cubs (1971)

José Luis Ortiz Irizarry (June 25, 1947 – January 20, 2011) was a Puerto Rican professional baseball player, an outfielder who played in the Major Leagues between 1969 and 1971 for the Chicago Cubs and Chicago White Sox. Born in Ponce, Puerto Rico, Ortiz threw and batted right-handed, stood 5 feet 9 inches (1.75 m) tall and weighed 155 pounds (70 kg).

He was traded along with Ossie Blanco by the White Sox to the Chicago Cubs for Dave Lemonds, Roe Skidmore and Pat Jacquez on November 30, 1970.

Ortiz appeared in 67 Major League games played over parts of those three seasons, including 36 for the 1971 Cubs. He collected 37 hits, including nine doubles and one triple. He had a .301 career average in 123 at bats. Defensively, Ortiz also accepted 72 total chances (67 putouts, 5 assists) as an outfielder without an error for a 1.000 fielding percentage. He played eleven seasons and 1,159 games in minor league baseball, retiring after the 1976 season.

Ortiz was manager for the Tucson Mexican All-Stars of the Arizona League from 1999 to 2000.
