= Petroleros de Minatitlán =

- Logo

Information
- League: Liga Mexicana de Béisbol (Zona Sur)
- Location: Minatitlán, Veracruz, Mexico
- Ballpark: Parque 18 de marzo de 1938
- Founded: 1992
- Folded: 2013

The Petroleros de Minatitlán (English: Minatitlán Oilers) was a professional baseball team playing in the Mexican League. Their homefield was the Parque 18 de marzo de 1938 in Minatitlán, Veracruz.

In 2014, the team was bought by an ownership group which relocated the franchise to Tijuana as the Toros de Tijuana.

== History ==
November 6 of 2006 : in Playa del Carmen, Quintana Roo, the Assembly of the Mexican Baseball League (LMB) gave the consent for returning Minatitlan Oilers with new directors headed by Mr. Ranulf Marquez Hernandez.

On January 6, 2007, the leadership of the Club unveiled Abelardo Vega as team manager for the 2007 season of the LMB; it was the first managerial role for Vega, a former star third baseman with the 2007 season.

February 5, 2007: begin training in the park "Deportivo Colon" in the city of Xalapa, Veracruz under the watchful eye of Abelardo Vega, supported by his staff composed of Carlos Esqueda, Roberto Méndez, Florentino Colorado Salvador Duarte.

February 12, 2007: Policy Minatitlan Oilers unveiled the name of the first foreign reinforcement for Season 2007 LMB, American right-handed pitcher Nick Mattioni.

February 15, 2007: Policy Minatitlan Oilers, led by its President Mr. Ranulf Márquez Hernández, announced at a press conference in reshaping developments that make the park "Sport March 18, 1938 "next scenario Mexican League. February 16, 2007: They were foreign defined four Minatitlan Oilers to face the summer circuit Season 2007, being named the American pitcher Nick Mattioni, outfielder Rene Reyes, American infielder Luis Lopez and closer Hector Ramirez, the latter from complications of his visa and not reported.

February 27, 2007: The U.S. Pitcher Nick Mattioni and center fielder Rene Reyes was reported to training camp in the park club "Deportivo Colon" in the city of Xalapa.

March 2007

March 1, 2007: Minatitlan Oilers won in his first Preseason game the Veracruz Rojos del Aguila with 3-1 slate Ixhuatlán Coffee population.

March 5, 2007: Oilers team Minatitlan training venue change, leave behind the park "Deportivo Colon" in the city of Xalapa and is now concentrated in the park "Sports President Miguel Alemán" the Port of Coatzacoalcos .

March 7, 2007: American third baseman Luis Lopez joined the club in training carried out in the port of Coatzacoalcos.

March 8, 2007: in press conference at the media coverage led by CP National Plinio Escalante, president of the Mexican Baseball League, was formally presented to Club Minatitlan Oilers popular hotel in Mexico City.

Present on behalf of the club of southern Veracruz Ranulf Mr. Marquez Hernandez, the president of the organization, Mr. Carlos Suarez Calero, general manager, also Abelardo Vega, manager and Santiago Gonzalez, baseball player emblem.

"We are happy to make possible the return of baseball in southern Veracruz," said Mr. Marquez Hernandez. "We have assembled a group of skilled labor, as we all called Mr. Fidel Herrera Beltrán, Governor of the State".

March 15, 2007: Policy Minatitlan Oilers unveiled officially came to an arrangement with the club Campeche Pirates to take the services of minatitleco right-hander Manuel Rodriguez Rodriguez on loan, who will strengthen the bullpen local computer.

March 17, 2007: Oilers Policy Minatitlan to the need to form a versatile pitching staff, succeeded in definitively changed services LHP Carlos Dominguez Martinez from Campeche Pirates.

March 19, 2007: Oilers Minatitlan Club held a Mass in the park "Sport March 18, 1938" in order to bless the building and team uniforms for the 2007 season. Later in known place Minatitlan city became official and formal presentation of the members of the ninth.

March 21, 2007: In his presentation at the LMB, Minatitlan Oilers beat the Red Eagle of Veracruz with a 5-3 slate. The center fielder Rene Reyes drove in two runs. The right-hander Alejandro Sanchez won the historic first Oilers game in his return to LMB.

March 21, 2007: With the first game of the 2007 season, Martinez turns 21 Seasons Grimaldo plays at second base, constitute a record for a second baseman, since last year surpassed the 19 he played Vincent "Magic Hands" Verdugo, who the LMB recognized as the man who has more seasons played at all times.

March 27, 2007: Baseball Club Minatitlan Oilers signed a working agreement with the organization leaguer St. Louis Cardinals in the "Roger Dean Stadium", located inside the spring training complex in Jupiter, Florida.

Ranulf Mr. Marquez, the club president Minatitlan Oilers, was pleased with the working agreement established with the Cardinals, the team that won the majors, because it will strengthen the link between the computers of the Mexican League (LMB) and Major League Baseball.

"In the particular is a very important step for our team," said Mr. Ranulf Marquez. "The agreement will allow us as an organization to maintain a close relationship of mutual benefit by working together."

March 27, 2007: during the first game of the series between the Oilers Minatitlan and Veracruz Rojos del Aguila, in the park "Sport March 18, 1938" Minatitlan city, Oscar FENTANES reached 1,500 hits lifetime on their way through the Mexican Baseball League (LMB).

April 2007

April 4, 2007: Policy Minatitlan Oilers, announced the addition of U.S. law and Russ Chist closer to reinforce the club's pitching staff to improve computer performance. At the same time announced the arrival of Cuban outfielder Amaury Cazaña.

April 23, 2007: The Oilers' defense made a play Minatitlan very rarely seen in a baseball game as it is the play of the triple play.

It happened in the fourth inning of the third game of the series between the Oilers and the Olmecs of Tabasco, held in the Park "Centenario February 27" of Villahermosa, Tabasco .

The episode was initiated by connecting Adriana Sharnol Curaçaoan hit to left before the pitcher releases Edgar Perez, who immediately gave him walked Carlos Sievers and allowed an RBI double to Hernando Arredondo, with which he entered the register Adriana, then Oscar Ramirez was hit to load the bases.

With Sievers at third, second and Ramirez Arredondo first, Gilberto powerful Sotomayor took the first base line, where the first base Shammar Almeida was well placed to take the ball for the first out, immediately took two steps forward to stepping the initial to the second and finally pulled out throw to second base where he was the shortstop Ivan Bellazetín to tread the middle, where Arredondo started toward third before he could return for the third out.

April 25, 2007: in the park "Sport March 18, 1938" Minatitlan, Veracruz, was made the fastest game nine innings of the season, in game that lasted 2 hours and 18 minutes, with masterful pitching of Venezuelan Edwin Moreno and Shammar batting Almeida, who hit 4-3, three runs scored and also stole a base, Minatitlan defeated the Oilers 7-1 Tigres de Quintana Roo to tie the series.

By Minatitlan pitchearon Edwin Moreno and American Chris Russ, while the Tigers Pablo Ortega and Eder Llamas, did not grant the four walks.

April 28, 2007: the exligamayorista Burgara Guillermo Velasquez joined Minatitlan Oilers came on loan for the remainder of the season from the Pericos de Puebla, with whom bateó.228, 2HR and 17 RBIs in 28 challenges in those who participated in this same campaign.

April 29, 2007: coaches and players from the Oilers Minatitlan, Petronila addition, the official mascot of the club, lived with children in the southern region of the state of Veracruz, who celebrated in advance on the occasion of Children's Day prior to the third game of the series against the Lions of Yucatán .

May 2007

May 8, 2007: the intermediatist Grimaldo Martinez is the absolute leader in most games played mark in all-time with 2,004 second base, leaving Jose Manuel Ortiz in a game that the Oilers beat Minatitlan 8 - 4 to the Olmecs of Tabasco in the first of the series in the park "March 18, 1938".

May 10, 2007: Policy Minatitlan Oilers held to all the mothers of the southern region of the state of Veracruz in this your day in the park "March 18, 1938", prior to the third game of the series against the Olmecs of Tabasco. About 150 "queen of the home" received a floral arrangement to admission to the property, and gave them a cake and soda, and they sang the traditional mañanitas.

May 15, 2007: Oscar FENTANES homered only during the 2007 season, which was also field homer was in the "Foro Sol" to the Mexico Red Devils of the fourth inning against the pitching of Martin Sotelo. In episode Cuban Amaury is Cazaña walked, then reached second base out to the middle of Shammar Oscar Almeida and then pulled FENTANES powerful line to center the gardener to the area, Daniel Fernandez, could not hold and spread the ball to the center field wall that momentarily tied the score at three runs.

May 19, 2007: In the longest extra-inning game of the season, and perhaps the most dramatic, the Oilers won in 13 chapters Minatitlan the Veracruz Rojos del Aguila with a 2-1 slate in the park "Beto Ávila "Jarocho port. Won José Félix Navarro and David Sinohui pedal with Roberto Barradas rescue in a matchup of three hours and 49 minutes.

May 24, 2007: selections were formed North and South Zone who faced the first to June 3 in the 75vo. Star Game Mexican Baseball League which was held at the University Sports Park "Beto Ávila" in the city of Veracruz .

In the combined South Zone were selected by the Oilers Minatitlan outfielder pitcher Santiago Gonzalez and right-hander Edwin Moreno.

June 2007

June 20, 2007: the club's board announced that Ramon Arano Bravo, the biggest winner of all time in the Mexican League (LMB), joined the coaching staff Minatitlan Oilers as pitching coach.

June 25, 2007: A wild pitch from Oswaldo Verdugo pitcher Yucatán Lions in the first game of the series in the park "March 18, 1938" crashed FENTANES Oscar's body.

The pitch made for the bottom of the fifth inning, was hit 165 lifetime's race also called "Phantom of Cosamaloapan" so exceeded 164 Hector Espino Gonzalez, who owned the previous mark.

June 27, 2007: In a match that lasted four hours and 20 minutes, the longest nine innings of the season, Yucatán Lions overpowered the Oilers 15-5 Minatitlan one June 26, 2007 in the park " Sports March 18, 1938 ", where a seven races in the fateful seventh inning, where he excelled three-run homer in the ninth in order, Alan Arredondo gave the victory and the series to the Lions.

July 2007

July 20, 2007: Venezuelan right-hander Edwin Moreno left the Oilers Minatitlan to enroll with the organization leaguer of the San Diego Padres who drafted him with the Missionaries of San Antonio, a subsidiary of Dual Class "A". The "Creole" leaves with 8-3 record and 2.71 ERA.

July 23, 2007: Abelardo Vega is sacked as manager of the Oilers Minatitlan after a brand of 35 games won and 68 lost.

July 24, 2007: Policy Minatitlan Oilers announced the appointment of Puerto Rican Edgar "Eddie" Castro Rivera as interim manager following the dismissal of Abelardo Vega.

July 29, 2007: Martinez Grimaldo reached 2,000 career hits in his tenure in the Mexican League (LMB) to connect a home run during the first inning of the third game of the series against the Warriors in Oaxaca and last of the 2007 regular season.

January 19, 2011: Begin development team's official website at: www.petrolerosdeminatitlan.mx, a site that provides information, statistics, live feeds, galleries, videos, wallpapers, and other relevant information for fans king of sports.
