= Elías Moreno Brizuela =

Mexican politician

- Born: 23 September 1957 (age 68); Catemaco, Veracruz, Mexico
- Education: Universidad Veracruzana
- Occupation: Politician
- Political party: Party of the Democratic Revolution

Elías Miguel Moreno Brizuela (born 23 September 1957) is a Mexican cardiologist and politician affiliated with the Party of the Democratic Revolution (PRD).

In the 2000 general election he was elected to the Senate for the state of Veracruz, serving during the 58th and 59th sessions of Congress. In 1994–1997 he served in the Chamber of Deputies representing Veracruz's 22nd district during the 56th Congress.
