= Marco Antonio Torres Hernández =

Mexican politician

- Born: 9 August 1961 (age 64); Zempoala, Veracruz, Mexico
- Occupation: Politician
- Political party: PRI

Marco Antonio Torres Hernández (born 9 August 1961) is a Mexican politician affiliated with the Institutional Revolutionary Party (PRI). In the 2003 mid-terms he was elected to the Chamber of Deputies to represent the 11th district of Veracruz during the 59th session of Congress.
