= Nanchital =

Municipality in Mexico

- Municipality
- Location in Mexico Nanchital (Mexico)
- Country: Mexico
- State: Veracruz
- Demonym: (in Spanish)
- Time zone: UTC−6 (CST)

Nanchital is a municipality in the Mexican state of Veracruz. It is about 438 km from Xalapa, the state capital. It has an area of 63.99 km^{2}. It is at 18°04′N 94°25′W.

== Geography ==
The municipality of Nanchital is delimited to the north by Coatzacoalcos to the south by Minatitlán and Moloacán.

The weather in Nanchital is warm all year with rains in summer and autumn.

== Economy ==
The local community depends on employment from the oil government company (PEMEX) and produces principally maize, beans, and rice.

== Culture ==
Every December is the celebration in honor of San Nicolás de Bari, town patron.
