= Dave Lemonds =

American baseball player (born 1948)

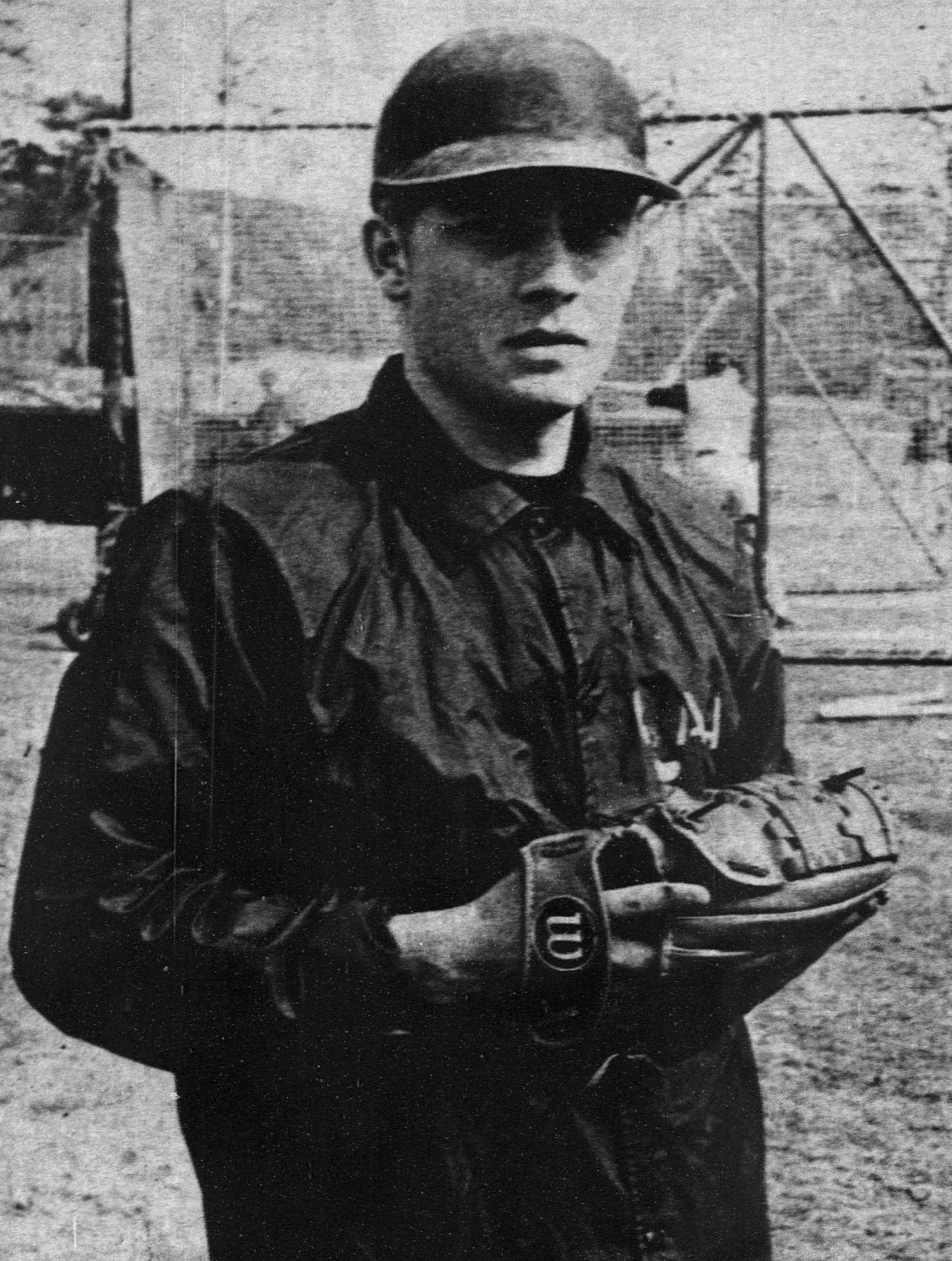
- Lemonds c. 1968
- Pitcher
- Born: July 5, 1948 (age 78); Charlotte, North Carolina, U.S.
- Batted: Left Threw: Left

MLB debut
- June 30, 1969, for the Chicago Cubs

Last MLB appearance
- October 2, 1972, for the Chicago White Sox

MLB statistics
- Win–loss record: 4–8
- Earned run average: 2.99
- Strikeouts: 69
- Stats at Baseball Reference

Teams
- Chicago Cubs (1969); Chicago White Sox (1972)

David Lee Lemonds (born July 5, 1948) is an American former professional baseball player, a left-handed pitcher who played in the Major Leagues in 1969 and 1972 for the Chicago Cubs and Chicago White Sox. Lemonds appeared in 33 Major League games, all but two of them for the 1972 White Sox. He started 19 games, and in 99 1/3 innings recorded 69 strikeouts and allowed 92 hits and 43 bases on balls. He retired after the 1974 minor league baseball season.

Lemonds attended Garinger High School in Charlotte, North Carolina. In 1965, he helped lead Garinger's baseball team to the North Carolina 4A state title. He also played on the Charlotte Post 9 American Legion team that advanced to back-to-back national championship games in 1964 and 1965. Charlotte Post 9 was coached by his father Jack, and won the American Legion national championship in 1965.

Lemonds went on to play for the University of North Carolina at Chapel Hill, where he was named first team All-American and Sporting News Player of the Year in 1968. UNC would late retire his number. He was drafted in 1966 by the San Francisco Giants during the 5th round but did not sign. He was drafted in the 1968 Amateur Draft (June Secondary) as the first pick in the first round by the Chicago White Sox.

He was traded along with Roe Skidmore and Pat Jacquez by the Cubs to the White Sox for Ossie Blanco and José Ortiz on November 30, 1970.
