= Luis Antonio Martínez Armengol =

Mexican politician

- Born: 23 May 1952 (age 74); Minatitlán, Veracruz, Mexico
- Occupation: Politician
- Political party: PRI

Luis Antonio Martínez Armengol (born 23 May 1952) is a Mexican politician from the Institutional Revolutionary Party (PRI). In the 2009 mid-terms he was elected to the Chamber of Deputies to represent Veracruz's 14th district during the 61st session of Congress.
