= Medel =

Medel may refer to:

- Medel (surname)
- Medel (Lucmagn), a municipality in Graubünden, Switzerland
- MEDEL, a European association of judges and public prosecutors
- MED-EL, manufacturer of implantable hearing solutions
