= Ruben Palma =

Danish writer

Ruben Palma (Santiago, Chile 1954) is a Chilean-born Danish writer.

== Life ==
Rubén Palma was born in Santiago, Chile, in 1954. He left Chile in 1973 immediately after the coup. Since 1974, he has resided in Denmark where he became Danish citizen. In 1985, he started to write in Danish, a language he adopted as means of literary expression.

Palma is a member of the Danish Author's Society and has worked for the Danish Red Cross since 1985.

Ruben Palma has published a number of fictional works in diverse genres. A collection of short stories, The trail we leave, initially in Danish, was printed in the United States in 2004 by Curbstone Press. His most recent volumes include a book of poems in Danish (2006) and a chamber opera in Danish and English.

== Work ==
(Narrative)

- Letter to Denmark (Brevet til Danmark)1989. Hjulet editors.330 pgs. Denmark
- The lost ghost (Spøgelse på afveje)
- Meeting with Denmark (Møder med Danmark) Hjulet editors.140 pgs. Denmark
- The Trail We Leave. Curbstone Press. 200 pgs. California. USA. 2004

(Plays)

- To the Flesh—To the Heart
- The Trade(Byttehandelen)
