= Lorenzo Medel =

Filipino classical pianist

Lorenzo Bueno Medel is a Filipino classical pianist.

== Life ==
Lorenzo Medel began piano studies at the age of 9 with his brother Andrew, shortly after which he won first place in the piano category at the 2005 La Salle Green Hills Music Fest. In 2006, Medel enrolled at the UP College of Music Extension Program, studying with Professor Mauricia Borromeo.

Medel won the first prize at the 2009 National Music Competitions for Young Artists Foundation (NAMCYA) competition. He has regularly been heard in live concert in his native country, as a recitalist and concerto soloist.

Lorenzo began piano studies at 10 years old with Mauricia Borromeo of the University of the Philippines. By 14, he had already garnered top prizes from Philippines’ premiere piano competitions – the National Music Competitions for Young Artists, the Piano Teachers’ Guild of the Philippines, the University of the Philippines Centennial Anniversary Piano Competition and the National Steinway Piano Competition. By 16, he had performed in twelve public solo recitals, three of which were full concertos assisted by the Manila Symphony Orchestra.

He participated in numerous festivals, including Art of the Piano, Chautauqua Institution and Bowdoin International Music Festival. He has performed in masterclasses by prominent pianists like Vladimir Feltsman, Boris Berman, William Wolfram, Alexander Gavrylyuk, Douglas Humpherys, Boris Slutsky, Malcolm Bilson, Matti Raekallio and Marina Lomazov. He is heard regularly in live concerts in his native country, as a recitalist and concerto soloist. He has participated many times in the Eastman School's community engagement concerts and in March 2017, he played an all-Liszt recital as part of the Liszt & Virtuosity International Symposium.

Besides solo piano, Lorenzo is an active collaborative pianist and was awarded the 2018 Excellence in Accompanying Award at Eastman. He has served as Principal Chamber Coach at the University of Rochester and has taught classes in piano at Eastman. He provides private piano lessons as Eastman Community Music School faculty. Additionally, he has given a piano masterclass at the Silliman University in the Philippines.

Lorenzo Medel received his Doctorate in Piano Performance and Literature at the Eastman School of Music, studying with Alexander Kobrin. He also received both his Masters and bachelor's degrees at Eastman under the guidance of Natalya Antonova. His Eastman studies were supported by the Howard Hanson, the Avis H. and Vaughan, and the V. R. Gray Scholarships, as well as the George Eastman Grant.
