= Antonio Benítez Lucho =

Mexican politician

- Born: 17 January 1955 (age 71); Hueyapan, Veracruz, Mexico
- Occupation: Politician
- Political party: PRI

Antonio Benítez Lucho (born 17 January 1955) is a Mexican politician from the Institutional Revolutionary Party (PRI). In the 2009 mid-terms he was elected to the Chamber of Deputies to represent Veracruz's 21st district during the 61st Congress.
