= Braulio Medel Cámara =

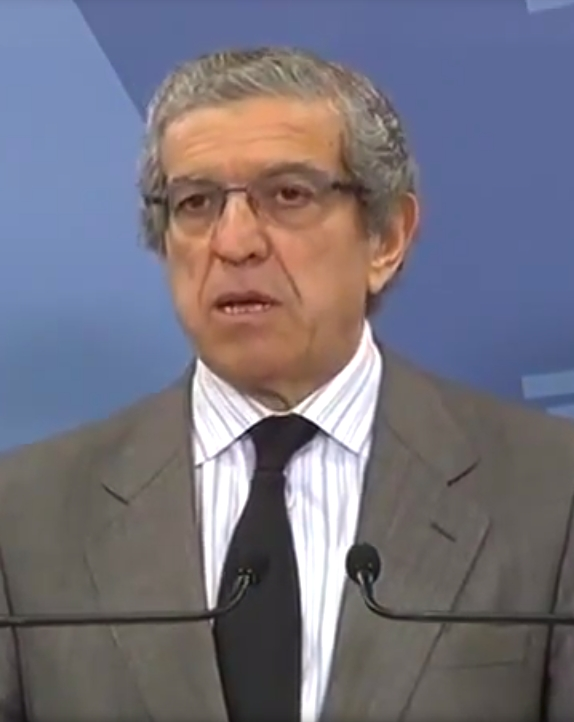
Braulio Medel Cámara in 2012

Braulio Medel Cámara (born 1947 in Seville, Spain). Chairman of Unicaja, a financial institution that holds 1.5% of the equity capital of Iberdrola. He has a Doctorate in Economic Sciences and Business Studies from Universidad Complutense de Madrid and is Professor of Public Finance at the University of Malaga.

== Career ==
Since 1991, Medel Cámara has been Chairman of Unicaja. He is also Chairman of the Federation of Savings Banks of Andalusia, and Vice-Chairman of the Spanish Confederation of Savings Banks, where he held the post of Chairman until 1998.

Medel Cámara is the Junta de Andalucía Undersecretary of the Economy and Finance. He has published over a hundred or so scientific works, counting books and articles in specialised journals. He has been the Chairman of the Iberdrola Advisory Council in Andalusia since its establishment in November 2004.

== Fraud charges ==
In 2014, Medel Cámara was charged with fraud in a still developing criminal case. The charges were about a supposed fraud of 117 million euros.
