= Gonzalo Guízar Valladares =

Mexican politician

Gonzalo Guízar
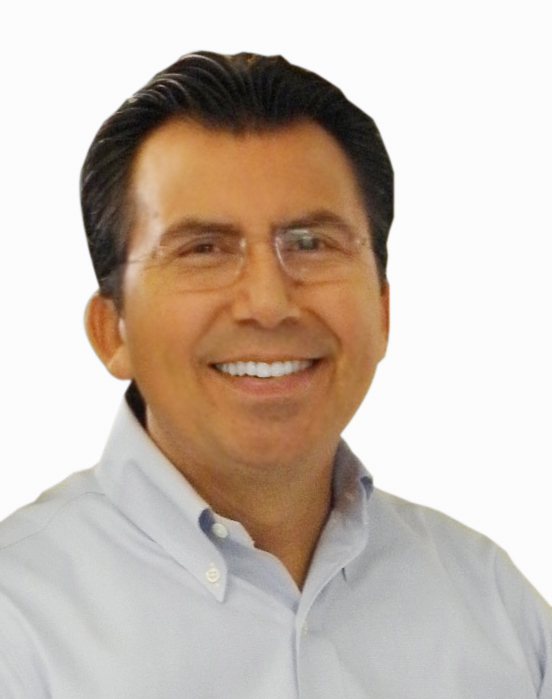
- Born: 27 April 1961 (age 65); Coatzacoalcos, Veracruz, Mexico
- Education: Universidad Veracruzana
- Occupation: Politician
- Political party: PRI (1985–2010); PAN (2010–present)

Gonzalo Guízar Valladares (born 27 April 1961) is a Mexican politician affiliated with the National Action Party (formerly with the Institutional Revolutionary Party). In the 2003 mid-terms he was elected to the Chamber of Deputies to represent Veracruz's 22nd district for the PRI during the 59th session of Congress.
