= Gloria Rasgado Corsi =

Mexican politician

- Born: 2 August 1955 (age 71); Coatzacoalcos, Veracruz, Mexico
- Occupation: Politician
- Political party: PRD (1989–2013)

Gloria Rasgado Corsi (born 2 August 1955) is a Mexican politician formerly from the Party of the Democratic Revolution (PRD). In the 2006 general election she was elected to the Chamber of Deputies to represent the 11th district of Veracruz during the 60th session of Congress, and she previously served in the 57th session of the Congress of Veracruz.
