= Abelardo Vega =

Mexican baseball player and manager (born 1946)

- Third baseman / Coach / Manager
- Born: 24 September 1946; Charay, Sinaloa, Mexico
- Bats: Right Throws: Right

Career highlights and awards
- Mexican Pacific League Rookie of the Year (1971); Diablos Rojos del México #7 retired

José Mercedes Abelardo Vega Rodríguez (born 24 September 1946) is a Mexican professional baseball coach and manager and a former third baseman. Vega spent 17 seasons playing in the Mexican League from 1968 to 1984, mainly with the Diablos Rojos del México. After retiring, he remained with the Diablos Rojos as a coach and won 11 championships, both as a player and as a coach.

== Early life ==
Vega was born on 24 September 1946 in Charay, Sinaloa. As a child, he was invited to play baseball in El Fuerte, where he earned a spot in the municipal league. He was later signed by the Diablos Rojos del México, who sent him to their minor league affiliates.

== Playing career ==
=== Mexican minor leagues ===
He began his baseball career in 1965, playing as a pitcher for Rojos de San Luis in the Mexican Central League, a feeder league for the Mexican League. During his two seasons with San Luis, he won 20 games and recorded 183 strikeouts. In 1967, he played for the Diablos Rojos de Las Choapas of the Mexican Southeast League. It was during his time in the minor leagues that he injured his right arm, which forced him to change positions and move to third base.

=== Mexican League ===
Vega made his Mexican League debut in 1968, appearing in four games with the Diablos Rojos del México, while also continuing to play in the minor leagues for Las Choapas and the Piratas de Tampico. In 1969, he played 44 games with the Diablos in the Mexican League, including a brief stint with the Diablos Rojos de Minatitlán of the Mexican Southeast League.

In 1970, with the help of scout Ramón "Chita" García, who had discovered him in the late 1960s, Vega became a full-time player for the Diablos Rojos del México, where he played as the starting third baseman until 1978. He was a member of four championship teams with the Diablos Rojos, in 1968, 1973, 1974, and 1976.

Vega played for the Indios de Ciudad Juárez from 1979 to 1981, joined the Sultanes de Monterrey in 1982, and returned to the Diablos Rojos in 1983, where he stayed until he retired after the 1984 season.

=== Mexican Pacific League ===
In 1971, Vega made his Mexican Pacific League debut with the Mayos de Navojoa, winning the Rookie of the Year Award and recording a .264 batting average, three home runs, and 31 RBI.

He spent 13 seasons in the Mexican Pacific League, playing for the Tomateros de Culiacán, Águilas de Mexicali, Yaquis de Obregón, and Venados de Mazatlán, and retired in 1984.

== Coaching career ==
After retiring, Vega worked as a coach for the Diablos Rojos del México organization with several of their minor league teams. From 1989 to 2005, he was the third-base coach for the Diablos Rojos in the Mexican League.

Vega made his managerial debut in 2007 with the Petroleros de Minatitlán, finishing the season with a 39–71 record. In November 2007, he was appointed manager of the Potros de Tijuana ahead of the 2008 season; he led the team to a 46–61 record and failed to qualify for the postseason.

In 2010, he rejoined the Diablos Rojos as a coach under manager Mako Oliveras.

== Legacy ==
Vega's number 7 was retired by the Diablos Rojos del México in 2005, during the team's 65th-anniversary celebrations. Alfredo Harp Helú, owner of the Diablos Rojos, included Vega in his all-time ideal team as a coach.
