= Joaquín Caballero Rosiñol =

Mexican politician

- Born: 10 May 1971 (age 55); Coatzacoalcos, Veracruz, Mexico
- Education: Universidad Veracruzana
- Occupation: Politician
- Political party: PRI
- Website: http://joaquincaballero.com/

Joaquín Caballero Rosiñol (born 10 May 1971) is a Mexican politician affiliated with the Institutional Revolutionary Party (PRI).

In the 2012 general election he was elected to the Chamber of Deputies to represent the 11th district of Veracruz during the 62nd Congress. Originally elected for the Ecologist Green Party of Mexico (PVEM), he switched allegiance to the PRI on 4 September 2012. He was granted indefinite leave from his seat on 3 April 2013.

He then served as the municipal president of Coatzacoalcos from 2014 to 2017, during which time he left what the Heraldo de Coatzacoalcos called a "financial disaster".
