= Moloacán =

Municipality in the Mexican state of Veracruz

- Municipality
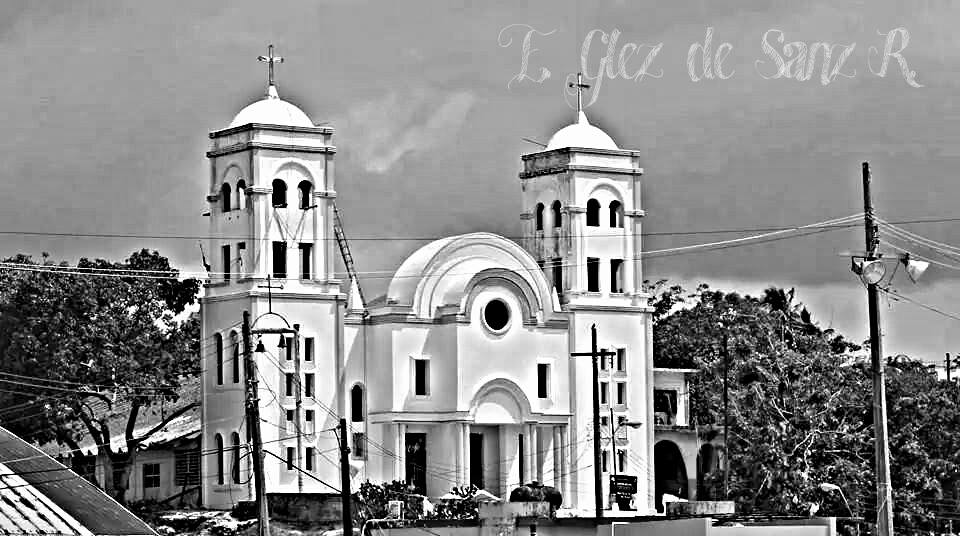

- Location in Mexico Moloacán (Mexico)
- Country: Mexico
- State: Veracruz
- Demonym: (in Spanish)
- Time zone: UTC−6 (CST)

Moloacán is a municipality in the Mexican state of Veracruz. It is located in the south-east zone of the state, about 456 kilometres (283 mi) from the state capital Xalapa. It has a surface of 261.57 square kilometres (100.99 sq mi). It is located at 17°59′N 94°21′W.

== Geography ==
The municipality of Moloacán is delimited to the north by Coatzacoalcos, to the east by Las Choapas, to the south by Minatitlán, and to the west by Ixhuatlán del Sureste.

The weather in Moloacán is hot all year round with rains in summer and autumn.

== Economy ==
It produces principally maize, beans, rice and orange fruit.

== Culture ==
In May, a celebration takes place to honor to Santiago Apóstol, patron of the town.
