= Agua Dulce, Veracruz =

Municipality in Veracruz, Mexico

Coordinates: 18.15°N 94.1333°W

Agua Dulce Agua Dulce
- Municipality
- Coat of arms
- Interactive map of Agua Dulce
- Country: Mexico
- State: Veracruz
- Congregation: June 20, 1934
- Rose to City: July 12, 1984

Population
  - Total: 44,101

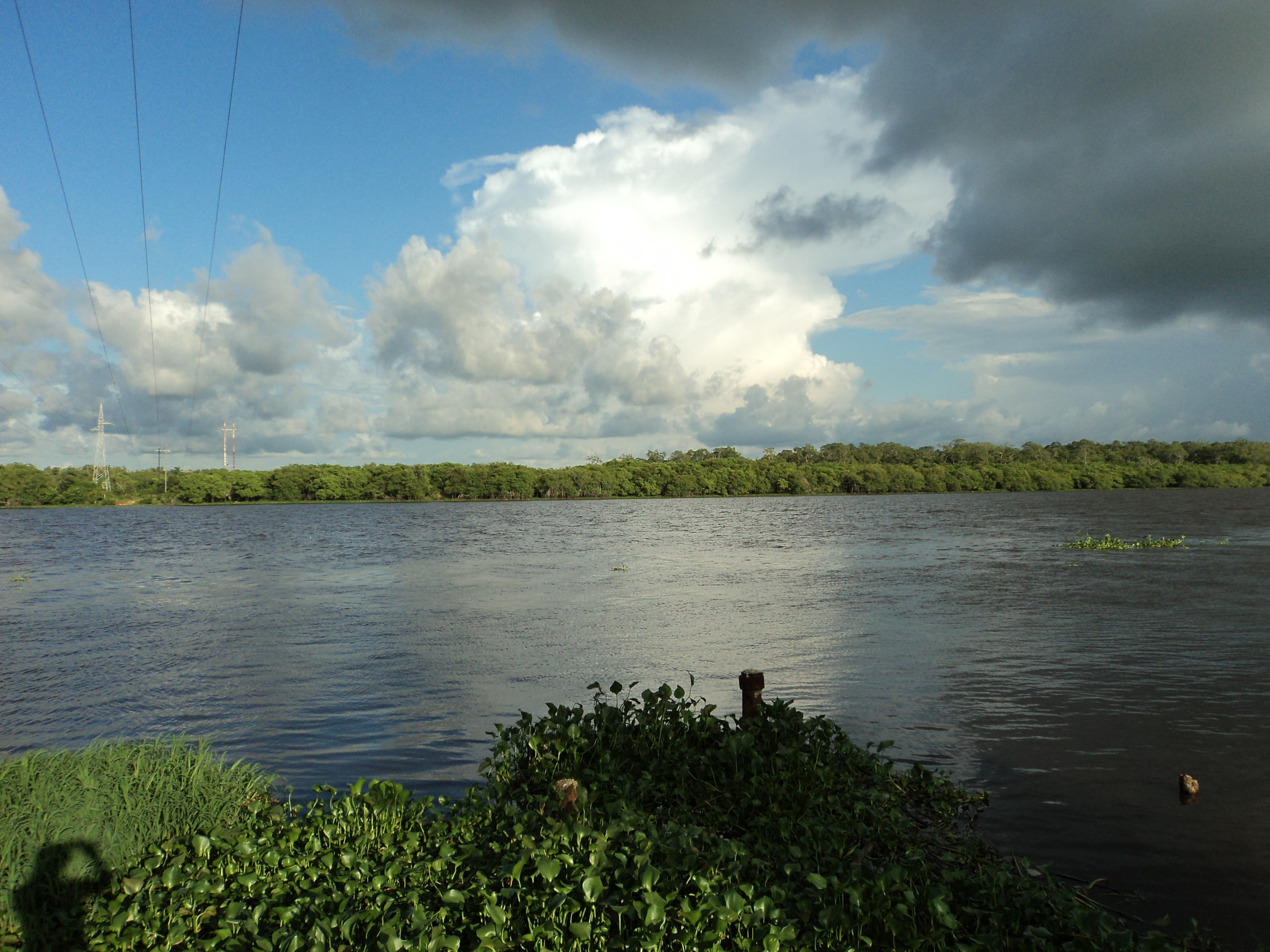

Agua Dulce is a municipality in the Mexican state of Veracruz. It is located about 330 kilometres (210 mi) southeast from the state capital Xalapa. It has an area of 372.03 square kilometres (143.64 mi^{2}).

== Geography ==
=== Borders ===
Agua Dulce is delimited to the east by the state of Tabasco, to the south by the El Pesquero River, to the west by the municipality of Coatzacoalcos and the Coatzacoalcos River, and to the north by the Gulf of Mexico.

== Government ==
The municipal president from 2022 until 2025 is Prof. José Noé Castillo Olvera.

== Education ==
The municipality of Agua Ducle contains dozens of kindergartens, both regular and CAIC-DIF. They also have many primary schools. Secondary-to-superior education schools such as Cobaev, Cecytev, Cetmar and Baccalaureate IVEA and UPAV are also located in this municipality, the latter offering access to higher education in the open system, as well as some particular institutes for the teaching of languages and computer skills.

== Products ==
It produces maize and rice.
