= Ixhuatlán del Sureste =

- Municipality
- Location of Ixhuatlán del Sureste in Mexico
- Coordinates: 18.017°N 94.38°W
- Country: Mexico
- State: Veracruz
- Established: 1831

Government
  - Municipal president: Samuel Hernandez Cruz

Area
  - Total: 276.37 km^{2} (106.71 sq mi)

Population (2005)
  - Total: 14,015
  - Density: 50.711/km^{2} (131.34/sq mi)
- Time zone: UTC-6 (CST)
- Website: ixhuatlandelsureste.gob.mx

Ixhuatlán del Sureste is a municipality in the Mexican state of Veracruz. It is located in the south-east zone of Veracruz, about 320 km (200 mi) from Xalapa, the state capital. The total area of the municipality is 276.37 km^{2} (106.71 sq mi).

The municipality is delimited to the north by Coatzacoalcos, to the east and south by Moloacán, to the south-west by Minatitlán.

The weather tends to be warm year-round with rains in summer and autumn. The chief agricultural products are maize, beans, rice and oranges.

In August there is a celebration in honor of Saint Christopher, the town's patron saint.
