= Jesús Rasgado =

Mexican singer-songwriter

Jesús "Chuy" Rasgado (1907–1948) was a Mexican singer-songwriter from Oaxaca. He is particularly known for writing the popular song "Naila".
