= Texistepec =

Municipality in the Mexican state of Veracruz

- Municipality
- Location in Mexico Texistepec (Mexico)
- Country: Mexico
- State: Veracruz
- Demonym: (in Spanish)
- Time zone: UTC−6 (CST)

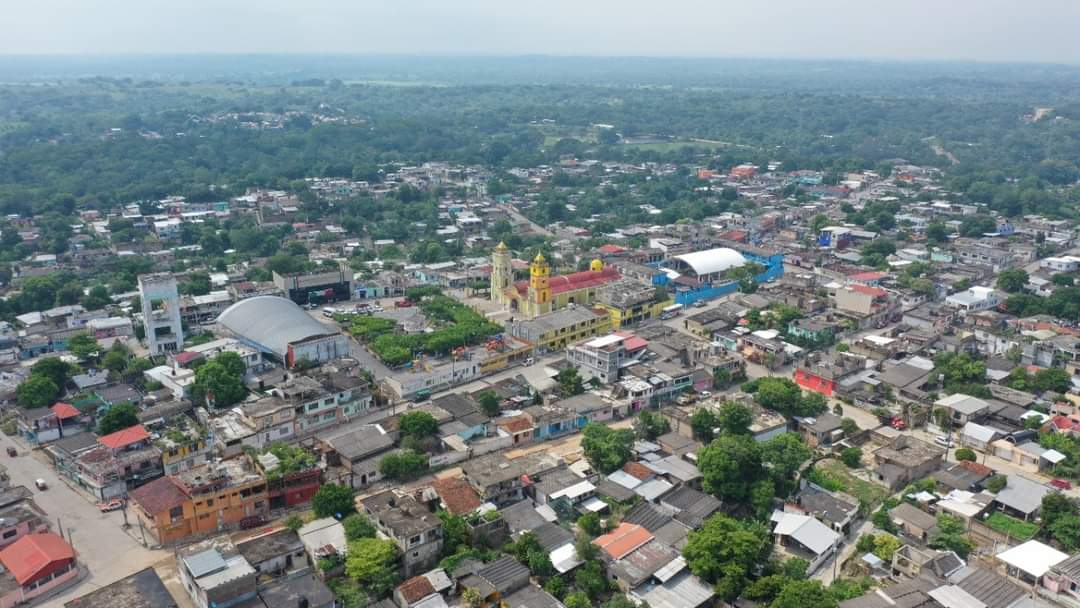

Texistepec is a municipality located in the south-east zone in the Mexican state of Veracruz, about 285 km from the state capital Xalapa. It has a surface of 615.26 km^{2}. It is located at 17°54′N 94°49′W. Texistepec in 1580 concerned to Coatzacoalcos's province. In 1831 San Miguel Texistepec was forming a municipality and was possessing 2 square leagues of lands with legal titles, southern people who suffered the batterings of the currents that our Mexican Republic had.

== Name ==
The name "Texistepec" comes from the Nahuatl roots te-ksis- "shell (egg)" + -tepe- "mountain" + -k: "in".

== Geography ==
The municipality of Texistepec is delimited to the north by Oluta and Soconusco, to the east by Hidalgotitlán, to the south by Jesús Carranza and to the west by Sayula de Alemán. The municipality is watered by small rivers that are tributaries of the Chiquito, affluent river of the river Coatzacoalcos.

The weather in Texistepec is very warm and dry all year with rains in summer and autumn.

== Agriculture ==
Texistepec produces principally maize, beans, oranges, rice and sorghum.

== Celebrations ==
In Texistepec, the celebration in honor of San Miguel Arcangel, Patron of the town, takes place in May and the celebration in honor to Virgen de Guadalupe takes place in December.
