= Hidalgotitlán =

Town in Veracruz, Mexico

Coordinates: 17°47′N 94°38′W

- Municipality
- Location in Mexico Hidalgotitlán (Mexico)
- Country: Mexico
- State: Veracruz
- Demonym: (in Spanish)
- Time zone: UTC−6 (CST)

Hidalgotitlán is a town in the Mexican state of Veracruz, with a population of near 18,000 in 2000. Its name derives from two words: one Spanish and the other indigenous. The first part is the family name Hidalgo (after the father of the modern Mexican nation, Miguel Hidalgo), and the second part is -tlan, a Nahuatl suffix that means "place".

The settlement stands on the Isthmus of Tehuantepec, on the left bank of the River Coatzacoalcos. The nearest major urban centre, the city of Minatitlán, Veracruz, is 17 miles (27 km) NNW upriver. Geographical coordinates of Hidalgotitlán are 17°46'N and 94°39'W. The main economic activities are agriculture and livestock.
