= San Juan Evangelista =

City in Veracruz state

- Municipality
- Location in Mexico San Juan Evangelista (Mexico)
- Country: Mexico
- State: Veracruz
- Demonym: (in Spanish)
- Time zone: UTC−6 (CST)

San Juan Evangelista is a municipality located in the plains of the Sotavento zone in the central zone of the Mexican state of Veracruz, about 260 km from the state capital Xalapa. It has a surface of 968.94 km^{2}. It is located at 17°53′N 95°08′W.

== Geography ==
The municipality of San Juan Evangelista is delimited to the north by Acayucan, to the east by Sayula de Alemán, to the south-east by Jesús Carranza, to the south by Oaxaca State and to the west by Juan Rodríguez Clara. There is watered by the river San Juan, which is a tributary of the Papaloapan.

The weather in San Juan Evangelista is very warm and wet all year with rains in summer and autumn.

== Agriculture ==
It produces principally maize, beans, coffee, rice, orange fruit and green chile.

== Celebrations ==
In San Juan Evangelista, in December takes place the celebration in honor to San Juan Evangelista, Patron of the town, and takes place the celebration in honor to Virgen de Guadalupe.

== History ==
Mariano Rodríguez Pérez, commander of the municipal police department, was assassinated in February 2019.
