= Coatzacoalcos Municipality =

Municipality in Veracruz, Mexico

Coordinates: 18.1250°N 94.3892°W

Coatzacoalcos
- Municipality
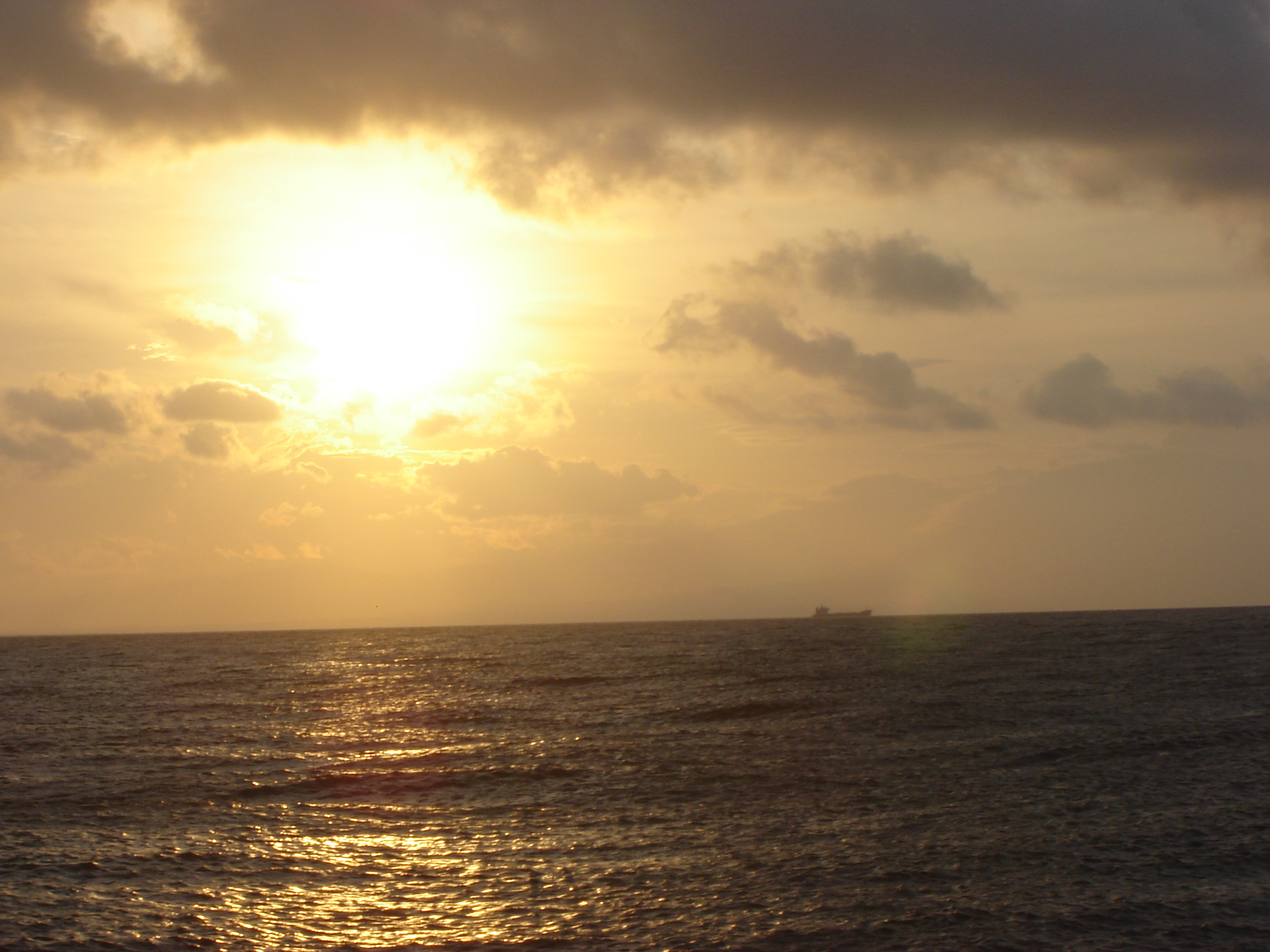
- The Gulf of Mexico

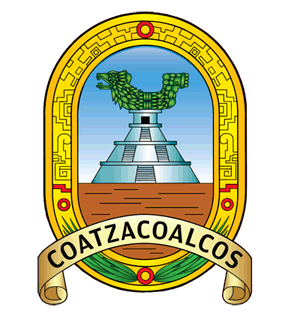
- Coat of arms

- Location in Veracruz
- Country: Mexico
- State: Veracruz
- Municipal seat: Coatzacoalcos

Area
  - Total: 309 km^{2} (119 sq mi)

Population (2020)
  - Total: 310,698
  - Density: 1,010/km^{2} (2,600/sq mi)

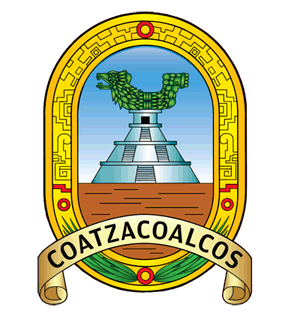
Coat of Coatzacoalcos City

Coatzacoalcos is a municipality in the Mexican state of Veracruz.

The municipal seat is the city of Coatzacoalcos, Veracruz.
