= Minatitlán, Veracruz =

Minatitlán
- City and municipal seat
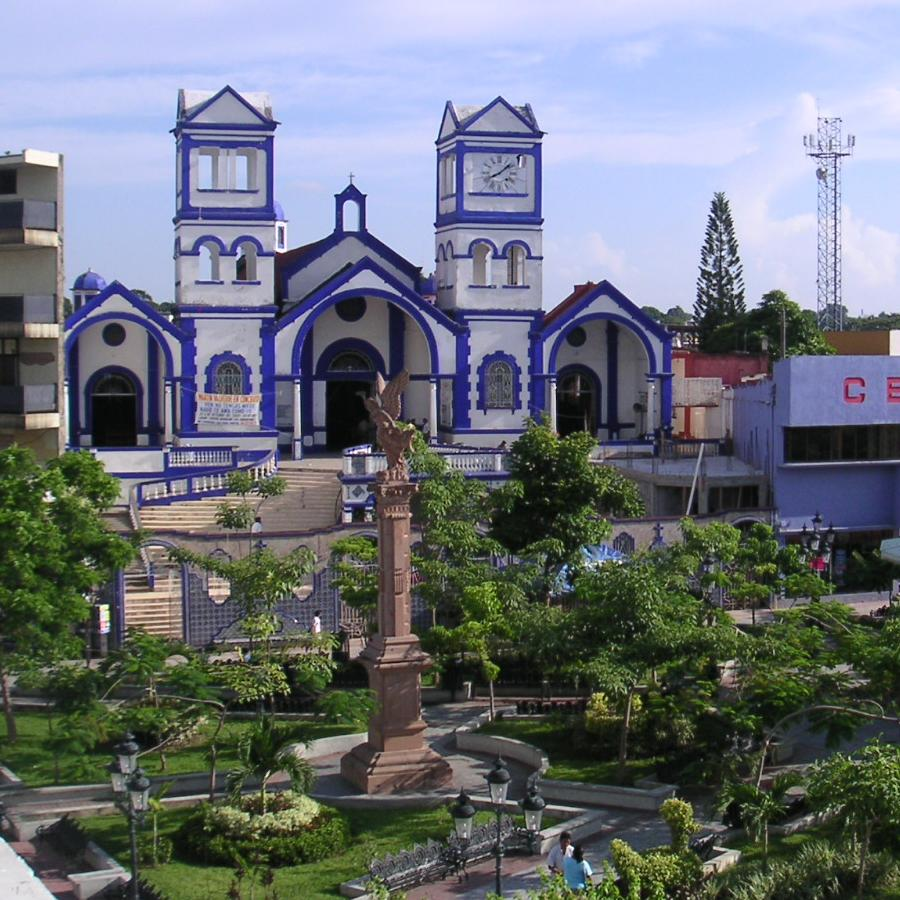
- Parque Central Independencia and Church of St Peter the Apostle

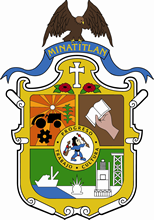
- Coat of arms
- Nickname: Tierra de Flechadores (Land of the Archers)
- Location within Veracruz Location within Mexico
- Coordinates: 17°59′N 94°33′W
- Country: Mexico
- State: Veracruz
- Region: Olmeca Region
- Municipality: Minatitlán
- Settled: 1826
- Founder: Tadeo Ortiz de Ayala

Government
  - Presidente Municipal: Guillermo Reyes Espronceda (Morena)
  - Federal electoral district: Veracruz's 14th

Area
  - Municipio: 4,124 km^{2} (1,592 sq mi)
- Elevation: 20 m (66 ft)

Population (2010)
  - Municipio: 356,020
  - Density: 86.33/km^{2} (223.6/sq mi)
- Demonym(s): Minatitleco, Minatitlense
- Time zone: UTC-6 (Zona Centro)
- Postal code: 96700 – 96927
- Area code: 922
- Airport: Minatitlán/Coatzacoalcos International Airport
- IATA Code: MTT
- ICAO Code: MMMT
- Website: www.minatitlan.gob.mx

Minatitlán is a city in the Mexican state of Veracruz. It is located in the southeastern part of the state, in the Olmeca region, to the north of the Isthmus of Tehuantepec, along the Coatzacoalcos River.

In 2010 the greater metropolitan area had a population of 356,020.

Minatitlán is home to the Refinería Gral. Lázaro Cárdenas del Río (now named for President Lázaro Cárdenas) a 1906 oil refinery that was the first such facility built in Latin America. The refinery underwent an expansion that started in 2003 to bring the capacity of the plant up to 240,000 barrels per day, up from its previous capacity of 185,000 barrels per day.

It is a sister city of Minatitlán, in the state of Colima, on the other side of the country. The local economy is largely dependent on the oil industry and trade.

The Feria del Café y Minería (Coffee and Mining Fair) is held each year in January.

== Transportation ==
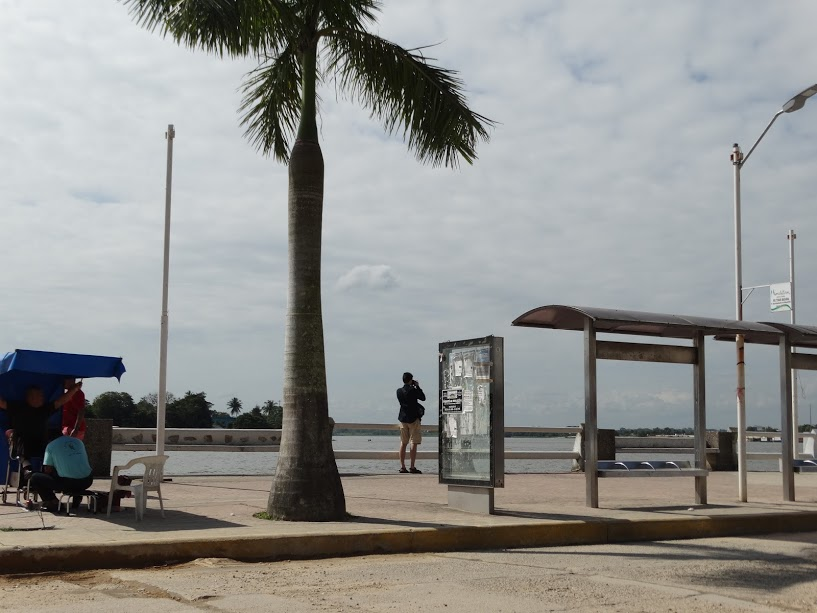
Riverside view

Minatitlán/Coatzacoalcos International Airport, located in Cosoleacaque, serves Minatitlán. Mexican Federal Highways 145D, 150, 172, 185 pass through Minatitlán. A cable stayed bridge known as Puente Coatza II or Puente Antonio Dovalí Jaime was built to carry Highway 150 over the Coatzacoalcos River. It was constructed starting in 1979 and was opened by president Miguel de la Madrid Hurtado on 17 October 1984. Coatza II has a center span of 288 metres (945 ft) and an overall length of 698.25 metres (2,290.8 ft).

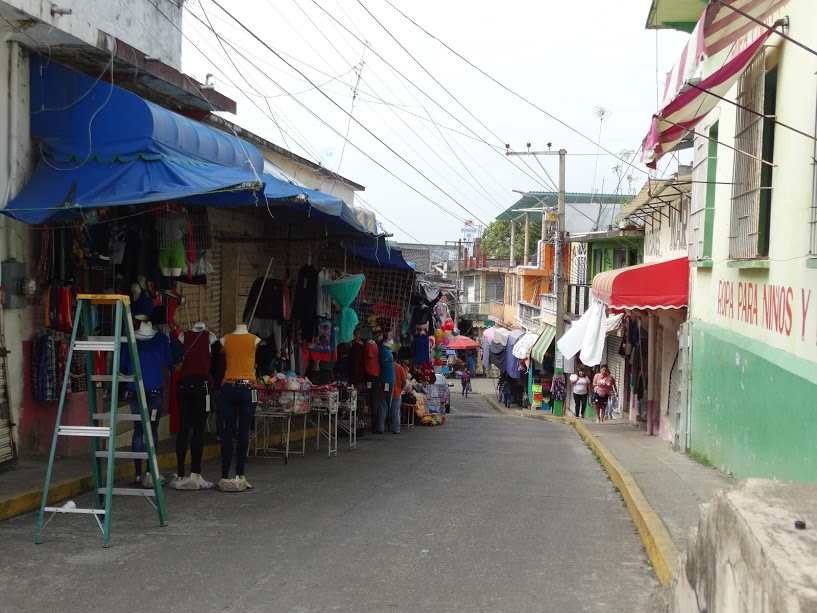
Street view

== Sports ==
The Petroleros de Minatitlán (Minatitlán Oilers) play baseball in the Mexican League. The Gavilanes de Minatitlán (Minatitlán Hawks) play in the Veracruz Winter League. Both teams' homefield is the Parque 18 de marzo de 1938.

== Notable people ==
- Politician Sergio Gutiérrez Luna was born in Minatitlán in 1976.
- Actress Blanca Estela Pavón was born in Minatitlán in 1926.
- Artist Francisco Toledo attended school in Minatitlán in the 1940s.

== Geography ==
The city is located in the Olmec region of the state and the north of the Isthmus of Tehuantepec.

The municipality covers an area of 4,123.91 square kilometers (1,592.25 sq mi) and includes many small outlying communities.

Much of the city sits on reclaimed wetlands, and many new homes built on this reclaimed land have a tendency to sink up to several meters before settling. Much of the surrounding undeveloped land is marshy, especially towards the northeast direction of Coatzacoalcos.

=== Climate ===
Climate data for Minatitlan Averages (1951–2010) Record Temperatures (1922-2004)
Month	Jan	Feb	Mar	Apr	May	Jun	Jul	Aug	Sep	Oct	Nov	Dec	Year
Record high °C (°F)	41.5 (106.7)	43.5 (110.3)	42.0 (107.6)	43.0 (109.4)	44.0 (111.2)	43.5 (110.3)	41.0 (105.8)	40.0 (104.0)	42.5 (108.5)	43.0 (109.4)	39.4 (102.9)	39.0 (102.2)	44.0 (111.2)
Mean daily maximum °C (°F)	26.5 (79.7)	27.9 (82.2)	30.9 (87.6)	33.4 (92.1)	34.9 (94.8)	33.6 (92.5)	32.3 (90.1)	32.2 (90.0)	32.2 (90.0)	30.9 (87.6)	29.5 (85.1)	27.2 (81.0)	31.0 (87.8)
Daily mean °C (°F)	22.1 (71.8)	23.0 (73.4)	25.0 (77.0)	27.2 (81.0)	28.7 (83.7)	28.0 (82.4)	27.2 (81.0)	27.2 (81.0)	27.0 (80.6)	26.1 (79.0)	24.8 (76.6)	22.9 (73.2)	25.8 (78.4)
Mean daily minimum °C (°F)	17.7 (63.9)	18.0 (64.4)	19.1 (66.4)	20.9 (69.6)	22.4 (72.3)	22.3 (72.1)	22.2 (72.0)	22.2 (72.0)	21.9 (71.4)	21.3 (70.3)	20.0 (68.0)	18.6 (65.5)	20.6 (69.1)
Record low °C (°F)	2.0 (35.6)	8.5 (47.3)	2.0 (35.6)	9.0 (48.2)	12.0 (53.6)	15.0 (59.0)	12.0 (53.6)	13.0 (55.4)	15.5 (59.9)	15.0 (59.0)	2.0 (35.6)	4.0 (39.2)	2.0 (35.6)
Average precipitation mm (inches)	109.8 (4.32)	52.9 (2.08)	40.4 (1.59)	33.6 (1.32)	114.4 (4.50)	269.8 (10.62)	283.5 (11.16)	356.9 (14.05)	467.4 (18.40)	387.6 (15.26)	229.7 (9.04)	146.3 (5.76)	2,492.3 (98.12)
Average precipitation days (≥ 0.1 mm)	6.7	4.4	3.1	2.0	5.0	11.5	12.2	16.2	17.1	13.8	11.4	9.6	113.0
Source 1: Servicio Meteorologico Nacional (Averages 1981–2000)
Source 2: Servicio Meteorológico Nacional (Record Temperatures)

== See also ==
- Minatitlán massacre, in which 14 people were killed on 19 April 2019.
