= Ana Pérez =

Ana Pérez may refer to:

- Ana Pérez (field hockey) (born 1978), Spanish field hockey player
- Ana Pérez (gymnast) (born 1997), Spanish artistic gymnast
- Ana Mercedes Pérez (1910–1994), Venezuelan poet, writer, translator, journalist and diplomat
- Ana Pérez Box (born 1995), Spanish judoka
- Ana Pérez-Neira, Spanish telecommunications engineer
- Ana Dolores Pérez Marchand, Puerto Rican physician
- Ana Elisa Pérez Bolaños (born 1973), Mexican politician
