= Gasca =

Gasca may refer to:

== People ==
- Ana Millán Gasca (born 1964), Spanish historian of science and scholar of mathematics education
- Pedro de la Gasca (1485–1567), Spanish bishop and viceroy
- Teresa Alcocer y Gasca (born 1952), Mexican politician

== Places ==
- Gâsca River, Romania
- Gîsca, Moldova, also spelled Gâsca
