= Eduardo Sánchez =

Eduardo Sánchez may refer to:

- Eduardo Sánchez (baseball) (born 1989), Venezuelan baseball pitcher
- Eduardo Sánchez (director) (born 1968), Cuban-born American director
- Eduardo Sánchez de Fuentes (1874–1944), Cuban composer
- Eduardo Sánchez Hernández (born 1964), Mexican politician
- Eduardo Sánchez Junco (1943–2010), Spanish magazine publisher (¡Hola!)
- Eduardo Sánchez Solá (1869–1949), Spanish painter, studied with Alejandro Ferrant y Fischermans
- Eduardo Sánchez Torel, Spanish-Argentine actor and director, directed Lilian Valmar in Departamento de soltero
- Eduardo Andrade Sánchez (born 1948), Mexican politician
- Eduardo Ávila Sánchez (born 1986), Mexican Paralympic judoka
- Eduardo Zarzosa Sánchez (born 1973), Mexican politician

== See also ==
- Eddy Sánchez (Demetrio Eduardo Sánchez Iglesias, born 1973), Spanish politician and economist
- Edu Sánchez (Eduardo Sánchez Lamadrid, born 2005), Spanish footballer
