= Jesús Ramírez =

Jesús Ramírez may refer to:

- Jesús Ramírez (Mexican footballer) (born 1957), Mexican footballer and football manager
- Jesús Ramírez (Venezuelan footballer) (born 1998), Venezuelan footballer
- Jesús Emilio Ramírez (1904–1981), Colombian geophysicist and seismologist
- Jesús Ramírez Rangel (born 1978), Mexican politician
- Jesús Ramírez Stabros (born 1963), Mexican politician
