= Beristain =

Beristain is a surname. Notable people with the surname include:

- Arturo Beristain (born 1949), Mexican professional wrestler
- Dolores Beristáin 1926–2010, Mexican actress
- Gabriel Beristain (born 1955), Mexican cinematographer
- Ignacio Beristáin (born 1939), Mexican boxing coach
- José Mariano Beristain (1756–1817), Mexican bibliographer and writer
- Lucía Beristaín (born 1968), Mexican politician
- Luis Beristáin (1918–1962), Mexican actor
- Luz María Beristain (born 1963), Mexican politician
- Moisés Beristáin, Mexican para-athlete
- Naiara Beristain (born 1992), Spanish footballer
- Víctorino Beristain (born 1956), Mexican water polo player
- Carlos Calvo (footballer, born 1992) (Carlos Calvo Beristain), Mexican footballer
- Iñaki Goikoetxea (Iñaki Goikoetxea Beristain, born 1982), Spanish footballer
