= Limas =

Limas may refer to:

== People ==
- Arlene Limas (born 1966), American taekwondo practitioner
- Ivan Rocha Limas (born 1969), Brazilian football player
- Limas Sweed (born 1984), American American football player
- Soledad Limas Frescas (born 1963), Mexican politician

== Places ==
- Las Limas, Mexico
- Limas, Rhône, France
- Quebrada Limas, Colombia

== Drugs ==
- Lithium (medication), lithium salts as medication

== See also ==
- Limas, plural of lima
