= General Martinez =

General Martinez may refer to:

- Jerry P. Martinez (born 1964), U.S. Air Force lieutenant general
- Fernando Alejandre Martínez (born 1956), Spanish Army general
- Hugo Martínez (police officer), (1941–2020), Colombian police general
- Roberto Badillo Martínez (born 1938), Mexican Army general
- Maximiliano Hernández Martínez (1882–1966), Salvadoran general and president of El Salvador (1931–1934, 1935–1944)
