= Ana Ramírez =

Ana Ramírez may refer to:

- Ana Ramírez (volleyball) (born 1981), Spanish volleyball player
- Ana Ramírez (rugby union) (born 1991), Colombian rugby sevens player
- Ana María Ramírez Cerda (born 1954), Mexican politician
- Ana María Ramírez (born 1948), Peruvian volleyball player

== See also ==
- Anna Ramírez (disambiguation)
