= Utrilla =

Utrilla is a surname. Notable people with the surname include:

- Alejandro Utrilla Belbel (1889-1963), Spanish cavalry officer
- David Utrilla, Peruvian businessman
- Jorge Baldemar Utrilla (born 1961), Mexican politician
- Olivia Utrilla Nieto (born 1969), Mexican politician

== See also ==
- Utrillo, another surname
