= Sergio López =

Sergio López may refer to:

- Sergio Augusto López Ramírez (born 1961), Mexican politician
- Sergio López (sprinter) (born 1968), Spanish Olympic sprinter
- Sergio López (sprinter, 1999) (born 1999), Spanish sprinter
- Sergio López Miró (born 1968), Spanish swimmer
- Sergio López (footballer, born 1989), Argentine football midfielder for Barcelona SC
- Sergio López (footballer, born 1999), German football right-back for SV Darmstadt 98

== See also ==
- Sergi López (disambiguation)
- Sérgio Lopes (disambiguation)
- López, the surname
- Sergio (given name), the given name
