= Angelica Sanchez =

Angelica Sanchez may refer to:

- Angelica Sanchez (musician) (born 1972), American jazz pianist
- Angélica Sánchez (born 1975), Mexican runner
- Angelina Sánchez Valdez (born 1978), Mexican politician
