= Daniel Pérez =

Daniel, Danny, or Dani Pérez may refer to:

== Law and politics ==
- Daniel Pérez Valdés (born 1963), Mexican politician
- Daniel Pérez Calvo (born 1966), Spanish journalist and politician
- Daniel Perez (politician), (born 1987) American politician
- Daniel Pérez Osma (born 1989), Spanish politician

== Sports ==
=== Association football (soccer) ===
- Daniel Pérez (footballer, born 1975), Argentine–born Chilean footballer
- Daniel Rodríguez Pérez (born 1977), Spanish footballer
- Danny Pérez (born 2000), Venezuelan footballer
- Daniel Pérez (footballer, born 2002), Venezuelan footballer
- Dani Pérez (footballer) (born 2005), Spanish footballer

=== Other sports ===
- Danny Perez (born 1971), American baseball player
- Danny Perez Ramírez (born 1977), American boxer
- Daniel Perez (boccia) (born 1981), Dutch Paralympic boccia player
- Daniel Pérez (basketball) (born 1984), Paraguayan basketball player
- Dani Pérez (basketball) (born 1990), Spanish basketball player

== Others ==
- Daniel Ayala Pérez (1906–1975), Mexican violinist and composer

== See also ==
- Daniel Peretz (footballer, born 2000), Israeli footballer
