= Arceo =

Arceo is a Spanish surname. Notable people with this surname include:

- Enrique Escalante Arceo (born 1969), Mexican politician
- Janet Arceo (born 1948), Mexican actress and TV presenter
- Leonardo Magallón Arceo (born 1954), Mexican politician
- Liwayway Arceo (1924–1999), Filipino fictionist, journalist, radio scriptwriter and editor
- Norberto Arceo (born 1943), Filipino cyclist
- Sergio Méndez Arceo (1907–1992), Mexican Roman Catholic bishop

== Places ==
=== Spain ===
- Arceo, hamlet in Valle de Mena
- San Vicenzo de Arceo, civil parish in Boimorto
