= María Jiménez =

María Jiménez may refer to:

- María Jiménez (singer), Spanish singer
- María Jiménez (footballer), Spanish footballer
- María Jiménez del Castillo, Mexican politician
