= Ferrat =

Ferrat is a surname. Notable people with the surname include:

- Hippolyte Ferrat (1822–1882), French artist
- Jean Ferrat (1930–2010), French singer-songwriter and poet
- Alain Ferrat (born 1973), Mexican politician
- Sebastián Ferrat (birth name Roberto González López; 1978–2019), Mexican actor
