= Salvador Sánchez (disambiguation) =

Salvador Sánchez (1959–1982) was a Mexican boxer.

Salvador Sánchez may also refer to:

- Salvador Sánchez (actor) (born 1943), Mexican actor and director
- Salvador Sánchez (astronomer), Spanish astronomer, director of the Astronomical Observatory of Mallorca
- Salvador Sánchez Barbudo (1857–1917), Spanish painter
- Salvador Sánchez Cerén (born 1944), Salvadoran politician and former guerrilla, president in 2014–2019
- Salvador Sánchez Colín (1912–2002), Mexican politician, governor of the State of Mexico in 1951–1957
- Salvador Sánchez (footballer) (born 1995), Argentine footballer
- Salvador Sánchez II (born 1985), Mexican featherweight boxer
- Salvador Sánchez Peñuelas (born 1951), Mexican politician from Sonora
- Salvador Sánchez Ponce (born 1991), known as "Salvi", Spanish footballer
- Salvador Sánchez Povedano (1842–1898), known as "Frascuelo", Spanish bullfighter
- Salvador Sánchez-Terán (1934–2022), Spanish politician, cabinet minister under Adolfo Suárez
- Salvador Sánchez Vázquez (1940–2014), Mexican politician from Nayarit
