= Perroni =

Perroni is a surname and may refer to:

- Gloria María Perroni (born 1943), Mexican politician from the National Action Party
- Maite Perroni (born 1983), Mexican actress, model and singer/songwriter
