= Margarita Martínez =

Margarita Martínez may refer to:

- Margarita Martínez Bernal (born 1964), Mexican politician from the State of Mexico
- Margarita Martínez López (born 1950), Mexican politician from Nuevo León
- Margarita Martínez, Colombian filmmaker, winner of the 2016 Maria Moors Cabot Prize
- Margarita Martínez, Colombian volleyball player, competed in the 2014 Women's Pan-American Volleyball Cup
