= Juan Nicasio (disambiguation) =

Juan Nicasio (born 1986), Dominican former professional baseball pitcher

Juan Nicasio may also refer to:

- Juan Nicasio Gallego (1777–1853), Spanish priest and poet
- Juan Nicasio Guerra (born 1954), Mexican politician
