= Justiniano (name) =

Justiniano is both a surname and a masculine given name. Notable people with the name include:

== People with the surname ==
- Alberto Justiniano, American theatre director
- Gonzalo Justiniano (born 1955), Chilean theatre director
- Leonel Justiniano (born 1992), Bolivian footballer
- Pedro Justiniano (born 2000), Portuguese footballer
- Raúl Justiniano (born 1977), Bolivian footballer

== People with the given name ==
- Justiniano Asunción (1816–1901), Filipino painter
- Justiniano Borgoño (1836–1921), Peruvian soldier and politician
- Justiniano Borja (1912–1964), Filipino politician
- Justiniano González Betancourt (born 1936), Mexican politician
- Justiniano Montano (1905–2005), Filipino politician
