= Alberto Vázquez =

Alberto Vázquez may refer to:

- Alberto Vázquez (singer) (born 1940), Mexican singer and film actor
- Alberto Vázquez-Figueroa (born 1936), Spanish writer
- Alberto Vázquez Martínez (born 1967), Mexican politician
- Alberto Vázquez (artist) (born 1980), Spanish comic book artist and filmmaker
- Alberto Vázquez, football referee in 2013 Copa de México de Naciones
