= David Ortega =

David Ortega may refer to:

- David Ortega (politician) (born 1966), Spanish politician
- David Ortega (swimmer) (born 1979), Spanish swimmer

== See also ==
- David Figueroa Ortega (born 1970), Mexican politician
- Raphaelle Ortega-David (born 1997), Filipina politician
