= Eric López =

Eric López may refer to:

- Eric López (footballer) (born 1993), Spanish footballer
- Eric Lopez (soccer) (born 1999), American soccer player
- Erik López (born 2001), Paraguayan footballer
- Eric Lopez (born 2002), known professionally as Ericdoa, American musician

== Also See ==
- Erick López (born 1972), Cuban gymnast
- Erick López Barriga (born 1971), Mexican politician
- Erika Lopez (born 1968), American novelist
