= Eduardo Nava =

Eduardo Nava may refer to:

- Eduardo Nava (sprinter), Mexican sprinter
- Eduardo Nava (tennis), American tennis player
- Eduardo Nava Bolaños, Mexican politician
