= Obdulio =

- Gender: Male
- Language: Spanish

Origin
- Meaning: He who calms in sorrowful moments
- Region of origin: Toledo, Spain

Other names
- Alternative spelling: Obdúlio (Portuguese)

Obdulio is a Spanish male given name. Notable people with the given name include:

- Obdulio Ávila Mayo (born 1974), Mexican politician
- Obdulio Diano (1919–2007), Argentine footballer
- José Obdulio Gaviria, Colombian politician
- Epifanio Obdulio Guerrero, known as Epy Guerrero, Dominican baseball scout
- Obdulio "Calulo" Hernández, Honduran footballer
- Obdulio Morales (1910–1981), Cuban pianist
- Juan Obdulio Sainz, Deputy National Director of the Argentine National Gendarmerie
- Obdulio Trasante (born 1960), Uruguayan footballer
- Obdulio Varela (1917–1996), Uruguayan footballer
- Obdulio Rogelio Zarza, Argentine boxer
