= Silvio Gómez Leyva =

Mexican politician

- Born: 12 September 1970 (age 55); Oaxaca, Mexico
- Occupation: Politician
- Political party: PAN

Silvio Gómez Leyva (born 12 September 1970) is a Mexican politician from the National Action Party. From 2006 to 2009 he served as Deputy of the LX Legislature of the Mexican Congress representing the State of Mexico.
