= Juan de Dios Castro Muñoz =

Mexican politician

- Born: 10 April 1970 (age 56); Ciudad Lerdo, Durango, Mexico
- Occupation: Politician
- Political party: PAN

Juan de Dios Castro Muñoz (born 10 April 1970) is a Mexican politician from the National Action Party. From 2006 to 2009 he served as Deputy of the LX Legislature of the Mexican Congress representing Durango.
