= Hilda Narváez Bravo =

Mexican politician (born 1974)

- Born: 4 October 1974 (age 51); Hidalgo, Mexico
- Occupation: Politician
- Political party: PRI

Hilda Areli Narváez Bravo (born 7 October 1974) is a Mexican politician from the Institutional Revolutionary Party. From 2006 to 2009 he served as Deputy of the LX Legislature of the Mexican Congress representing Hidalgo.
