= Nelly Hurtado Pérez =

Mexican politician

- Born: 15 November 1975 (age 50); Aguascalientes, Mexico
- Occupation: Politician
- Political party: PAN

Nelly Hurtado Pérez (born 15 November 1975) is a Mexican politician from the National Action Party. From 2006 to 2009 she served as Deputy of the LX Legislature of the Mexican Congress representing Aguascalientes.
