= Juan Manuel Sandoval Munguia =

Mexican politician

- Born: 29 October 1966 (age 59); Guerrero, Mexico
- Occupation: Politician
- Political party: PAN

Juan Manuel Sandoval Munguia (born 29 October 1966) is a Mexican politician from the National Action Party. From 2006 to 2009 he served as Deputy of the LX Legislature of the Mexican Congress representing the State of Mexico.
