= José Antonio Almazán González =

Mexican politician

- Born: 1 June 1949 (age 76); Veracruz, Mexico
- Occupation: Politician
- Political party: PRD

José Antonio Almazán González (born 1 June 1949) is a Mexican politician from the Party of the Democratic Revolution. From 2006 to 2009 he served as Deputy of the LX Legislature of the Mexican Congress representing Veracruz.
