= Aída Marina Arvizu Rivas =

Mexican politician

- Born: 23 July 1963 (age 62); Ciudad Cuauhtémoc, Chihuahua, Mexico
- Occupation: Politician
- Political party: PASD

Aída Marina Arvizu Rivas (born 23 July 1963) is a Mexican politician formerly from the Social Democratic Party. From 2006 to 2009 she served as Deputy of the LX Legislature of the Mexican Congress representing the Federal District.
