= Joaquín Vela González =

Mexican politician

- Born: 11 February 1954 (age 72); Aguascalientes, Aguascalientes, Mexico
- Education: UNAM
- Occupations: Politician, Economist and Social Leader
- Political party: Labor Party (1970s–2009); Party of the Democratic Revolution (2009–2017)

Joaquín Humberto Vela González (born 11 February 1954) is a Mexican politician from the Party of the Democratic Revolution (formerly from the Labor Party). From 2006 to 2009 he served as Deputy of the LX Legislature of the Mexican Congress representing the State of Mexico.
