= Erika Galván Rivas =

Mexican politician

- Born: 14 November 1978 (age 47); State of Mexico, Mexico
- Occupation: Politician
- Political party: PAN

Erika Galván Rivas (born 14 November 1978) is a Mexican politician from the National Action Party. In 2009 she served as Deputy of the LX Legislature of the Mexican Congress representing the State of Mexico.
