= Alicia Rodríguez Martínez =

Mexican politician

- Born: 23 June 1936 (age 89); Morelos, Mexico
- Died: February 24, 2019; Jojutla, Morelos
- Occupation: Politician
- Political party: PRI
- Spouse: Alberto Hernandez Lopez
- Children: 6

Alicia Rodríguez Martínez (born 23 June 1936) is a Mexican politician from the Institutional Revolutionary Party. In 2009 she served as Deputy of the LX Legislature of the Mexican Congress representing Morelos.
