= Alejandro Chanona =

Mexican politician

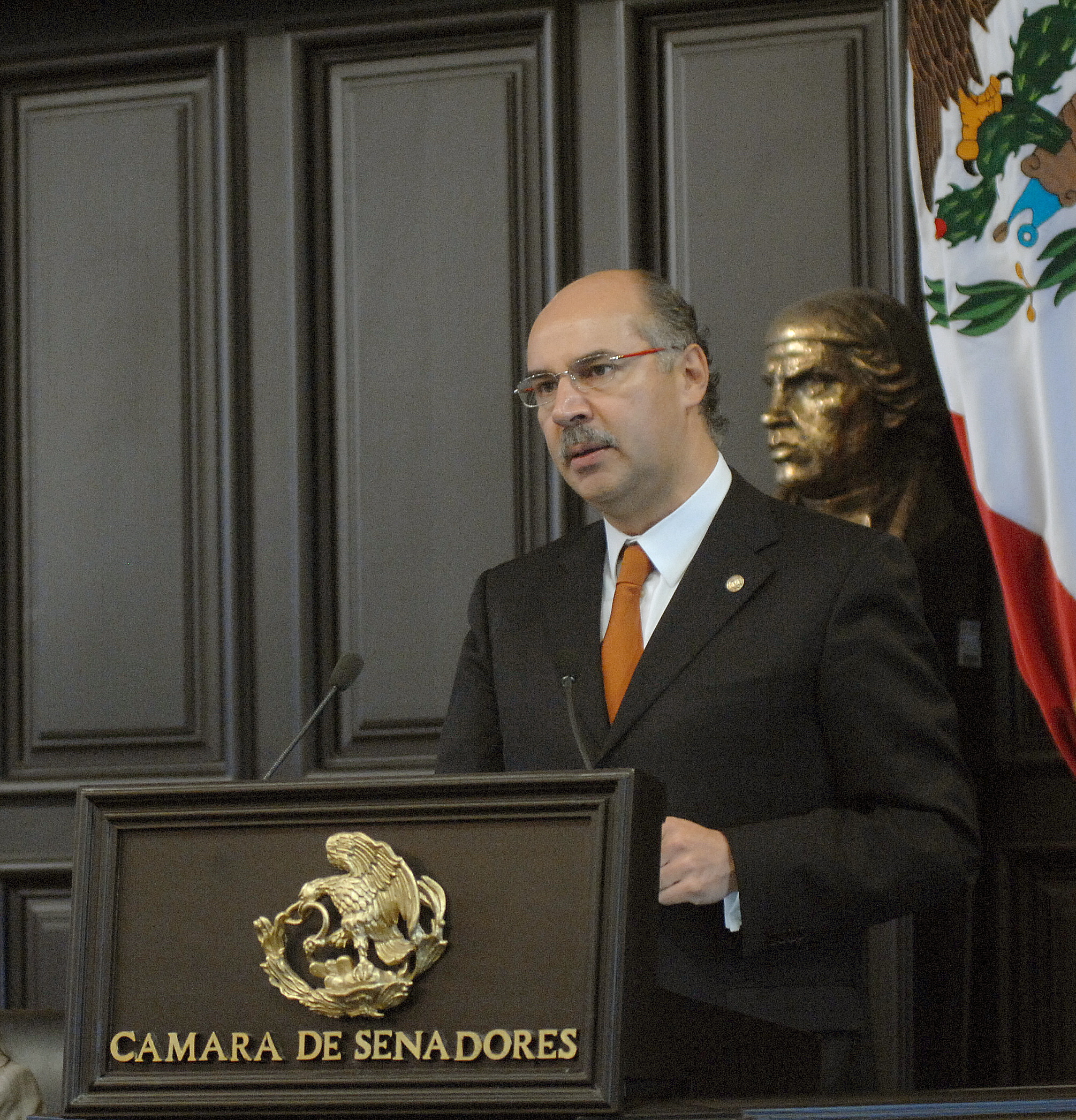
- Born: Chiapas, Mexico
- Education: National Autonomous University of Mexico
- Occupations: Academic and politician
- Political party: MC

Alejandro Chanona Burguete is a Mexican academic, researcher and politician from the Citizens' Movement. From 2006 to 2009, he served as Deputy of the LX Legislature of the Mexican Congress representing the Federal District.
