= Magdalena Macedo Domínguez =

Mexican politician

- Born: 25 May 1955 (age 70); State of Mexico, Mexico
- Occupation: Politician
- Political party: PAN

María Magdalena Macedo Domínguez (born 25 May 1955) is a Mexican politician from the National Action Party. In 2009 she served as Deputy of the LX Legislature of the Mexican Congress representing the State of Mexico.
