= Martha Cecilia Díaz Gordillo =

Mexican politician

- Born: 28 March 1967 (age 59); Teopisca, Chiapas, Mexico
- Occupation: Politician
- Political party: PAN

Martha Cecilia Díaz Gordillo (born 28 March 1967) is a Mexican politician from the National Action Party. From 2006 to 2009 she served as Deputy of the LX Legislature of the Mexican Congress representing Chiapas.
