= Claudia Corichi García =

Mexican politician

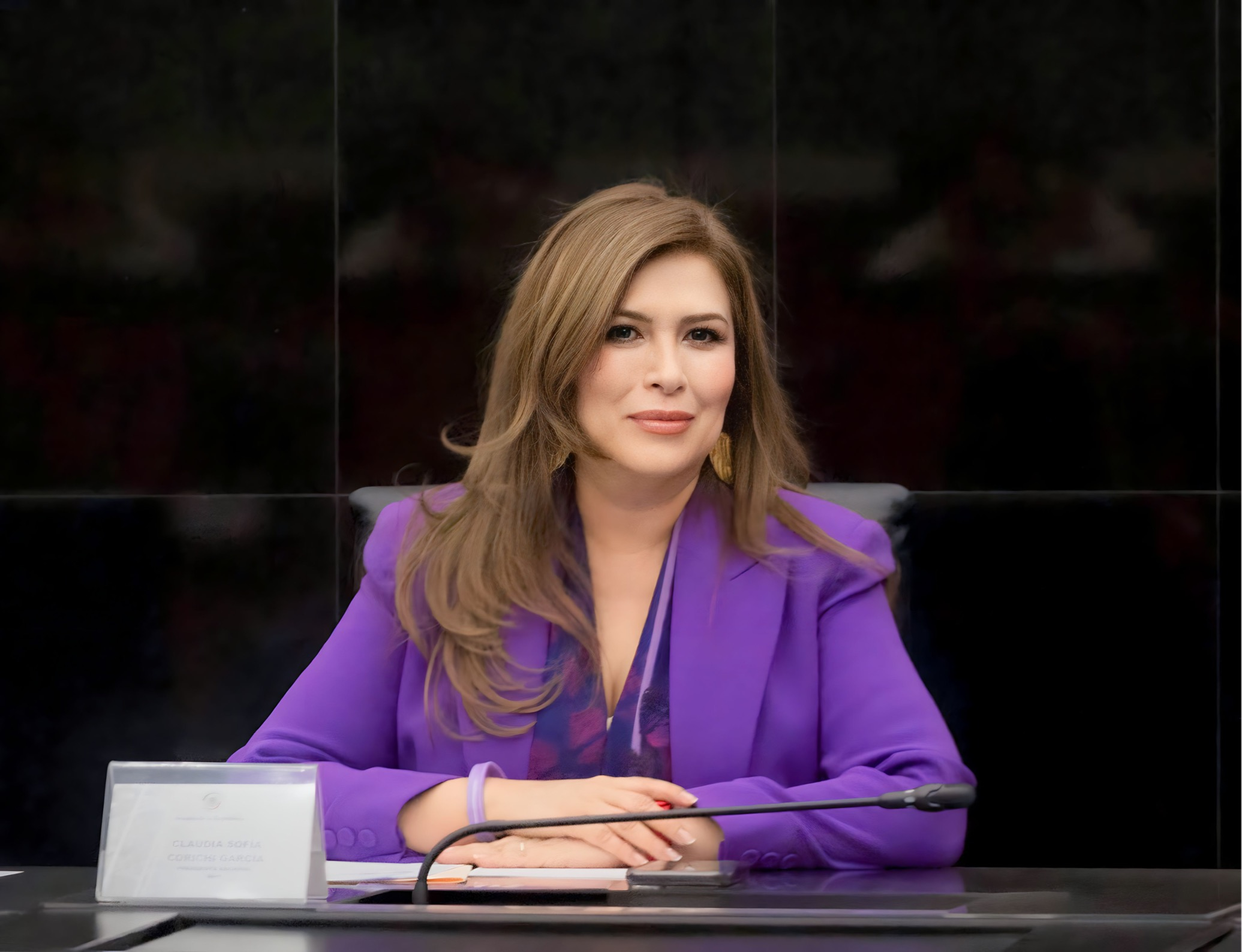
- Born: Mexico City, Mexico
- Occupation: Federal deputy
- Political party: Movimiento Ciudadano

Claudia Sofía Corichi García (born 20 May 1974) is a Mexican politician affiliated with Movimiento Ciudadano ("Citizens' Movement"). She is a proportional representation federal deputy representing Zacatecas and the second electoral region in the LXIII Legislature of the Mexican Congress.

== Life ==
Corichi graduated with a degree in economics from the UNAM and also was a research assistant and teacher of economic history. During this time, she was a part of the National Association of Economics Students and represented the UNAM economics school.

Corichi's political career began in the Party of the Democratic Revolution (PRD). She was part of the Democratic Youth wing of the party in 1998 and spent a five-year term as the vice president of the International Union of Socialist Youth from 1998 to 2003. She also advised the PRD's senators and worked on the delegational level in the borough of Benito Juárez.

In the 2000s and early 2010s, Corichi's political career moved to Zacatecas. She was the state director of social management in 2001, a coordinator for the state Secretariat of Social Development from 2002 to 2003, and the honorary president of its DIF from 2004 to 2006.

In the PRD, she was a councilor and a national secretary; of public policy from 2003 to 2004, legislative coordination from 2004 to 2005, and electoral action from 2005 to 2006. Simultaneously, she was a columnist for El Sol de Zacatecas and La Jornada Zacatecas newspapers and sat on the editorial board of Reforma between 2003 and 2005.

In 2006, the PRD sent Corichi to the Senate for the LX and LXI Legislatures as a proportional representation senator representing the Federal District. She was the secretary of the Board of Directors and presided over the Hydraulic Resources and Urban Development and Land Use Commissions, in addition to sitting on those dealing with Equity and Gender; Foreign Relations/North America; Communications and Transportation; and Health. In addition, she was involved in the Parliamentary Confederation of the Americas, where she was the vice coordinator of the Commission on Democracy and Peace and presided over the Science, Technology and Education Commission. In 2010, she began hosting a program on Radio Fórmula, which ran for four years.

In 2014, she picked up a master's degree in strategic governance and political communications, as well as a graduate degree in public policy from a gender perspective. After leaving the Senate, she flipped to Movimiento Ciudadano ("Citizens' Movement"); her arrival in the party and other national-level decisions prompted the president of Movimiento Ciudadano in Zacatecas, Saúl Monreal, to leave the party altogether.

MC placed Corichi second on its list of proportional representation deputy candidates from the second region in 2015, guaranteeing her a spot in the LXIII Legislature.

She is the president of a special commission set up to monitor federal purchasing, as well as a member of the Foreign Relations, Oversight of the Superior Auditor of the Federation, and Hydraulic Resources Commissions.

== Personal ==
Corichi is the daughter of Amalia García Medina, the Governor of Zacatecas from 2004 to 2010. She is married to Eugenio Govea, who in 2015 ran for a Movimiento Ciudadano seat in San Luis Potosí.
