= Rosa Elva Soriano Sánchez =

Mexican politician

- Born: 4 July 1962 (age 63); Michoacán, Mexico
- Occupation: Politician
- Political party: PRD

Rosa Elva Soriano Sánchez (born 4 July 1962) is a Mexican politician from the Party of the Democratic Revolution. From 2006 to 2009, she served as Deputy of the LX Legislature of the Mexican Congress representing Michoacán.
