= Erika Larregui Nagel =

Mexican politician

- Born: 12 March 1972 (age 54); Sinaloa, Mexico
- Occupation: Politician
- Political party: PVEM

Erika Larregui Nagel (born 12 March 1972) is a Mexican politician from the Ecologist Green Party of Mexico. From 2006 to 2009 she served as Deputy of the LX Legislature of the Mexican Congress representing Sinaloa.
