= María Rodríguez Preciado =

Mexican politician (born 1978)

- Born: 11 November 1978 (age 47); Guanajuato, Mexico
- Occupation: Politician
- Political party: PAN

María Magdalena Rodríguez Preciado (born 11 November 1978) is a Mexican politician from the National Action Party. In 2009 she served as Deputy of the LX Legislature of the Mexican Congress representing Guanajuato.
