= María del Carmen Salvatori Bronca =

Mexican politician

- Born: 19 August 1957 (age 68); San Gregorio Atzompa, Puebla, Mexico
- Occupation: Politician
- Political party: MC

María del Carmen Salvatori Bronca (born 19 August 1957) is a Mexican politician from the Citizens' Movement. From 2006 to 2009 she served as Deputy of the LX Legislature of the Mexican Congress representing Veracruz.
