= Martha Partida Guzmán =

Mexican politician

- Born: 12 January 1978 (age 48); Tecuala, Nayarit, Mexico
- Occupation: Politician
- Political party: PRI

Martha Rocío Partida Guzmán (born 12 January 1978) is a Mexican politician from the Institutional Revolutionary Party. From 2008 to 2009 she served as Deputy of the LX Legislature of the Mexican Congress representing Nayarit.
