= Miguel Rivero Acosta =

Mexican politician (born 1965)

- Born: 31 July 1965 (age 60); Hidalgo, Mexico
- Occupation: Politician
- Political party: PRI

Miguel Rivero Acosta (born 31 July 1965) is a Mexican politician from the Institutional Revolutionary Party. From 2006 to 2009 he served as a federal deputy of the LX Legislature of the Mexican Congress representing Hidalgo. He previously served as municipal president of Tenango de Doria from 2003 to 2006 before serving as a local deputy in the Congress of Hidalgo.
