= Faustino Soto Ramos =

Mexican politician

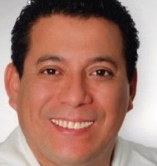
- 2016 by Virilus
- Born: 14 November 1965 (age 60); Mexico City, Mexico
- Occupation: Politician
- Political party: PRD

Faustino Soto Ramos (born 14 November 1965) is a Mexican politician from the Party of the Democratic Revolution. From 2006 to 2009 he served as Deputy of the LX Legislature of the Mexican Congress representing the Federal District.
