= Héctor Padilla Gutiérrez =

Mexican politician (born 1949)

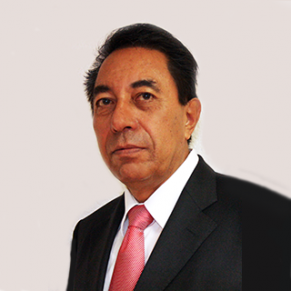
- Born: 20 August 1949 (age 76); Jalisco, Mexico
- Occupation: Politician
- Political party: PRI

Héctor Padilla Gutiérrez (born 20 August 1949) is a Mexican politician from the Institutional Revolutionary Party. From 2006 to 2009 he served as Deputy of the LX Legislature of the Mexican Congress representing Jalisco.
