= Francisco Dávila García =

Mexican politician (born 1966)

- Born: 2 April 1966 (age 60); Aguascalientes, Mexico
- Occupation: Politician
- Political party: PAN

Francisco Dávila García (born 2 April 1966) is a Mexican politician from the National Action Party. From 2006 to 2009 he served as Deputy of the LX Legislature of the Mexican Congress representing Aguascalientes.
