= Ofelia Malcos Amaro =

Mexican politician

- Born: 2 April 1968 (age 58); Tlaxcala, Mexico
- Occupation: Politician
- Political party: PAN

María Ofelia Gloria Malcos Amaro (born 2 April 1968) is a Mexican politician from the National Action Party. From 2007 to 2009 she served as Deputy of the LX Legislature of the Mexican Congress representing Tlaxcala.
