= LX Legislature of the Mexican Congress =

60th Congress LX Legislatura
←	59th	61st	→

Overview
- Legislative body: Congress of the Union
- Meeting place: Palacio Legislativo de San Lázaro (Chamber of Deputies); Edificio del Senado (Senate)
- Term: 1 September 2006 – 31 August 2009
- Election: 2 July 2006

Senate of the Republic
- Members: 128

Chamber of Deputies
- Members: 500

The LX Legislature (60th session) of the Congress of Mexico met from September 1, 2006, to September 1, 2009. All members of both the lower and upper houses of Congress were elected in the elections of July 2006.

== Members of the LX Legislature by state ==
=== Senators by state ===
State	Senator	Party	State	Senator	Party
Aguascalientes	Felipe González González	PAN	Nayarit	Raúl José Mejía González	PRI
Aguascalientes	Rubén Camarillo Ortega	PAN	Nayarit	Gerardo Montenegro Ibarra	PRI
Aguascalientes	Carlos Lozano de la Torre	PRI	Nayarit	Francisco Javier Castellón	PRD
Baja California	Alejandro González Alcocer	PAN	Nuevo León	Fernando Elizondo Barragán	PAN
Baja California	Jaime Rafael Díaz Ochoa	PAN	Nuevo León	Blanca Judith Díaz Delgado	PAN
Baja California	Fernando Castro Trenti	PRI	Nuevo León	Eloy Cantú Segovia	PRI
Baja California Sur	Francisco Javier Obregón Espinoza	PT	Oaxaca	Gabino Cué Monteagudo	MC
Baja California Sur	Josefina Cota Cota	PT	Oaxaca	Salomón Jara Cruz	PRD
Baja California Sur	Luis Coppola Joffroy	PAN	Oaxaca	Adolfo Toledo Infanzón	PRI
Campeche	Fernando Ortega Bernés	PRI	Puebla	Rafael Moreno Valle	PAN
Campeche	Alejandro Moreno Cárdenas	PRI	Puebla	Humberto Aguilar Coronado	PAN
Campeche	Sebastián Calderón Centeno	PAN	Puebla	Melquiades Morales	PRI
Chiapas	Manuel Velasco Coello	PVEM	Querétaro	Guillermo Tamborrel Suárez	PAN
Chiapas	María Elena Orantes	PRI	Querétaro	Eduardo Nava Bolaños	PAN
Chiapas	Rubén Velázquez López	PRD	Querétaro	José Eduardo Calzada Rovirosa	PRI
Chihuahua	Gustavo Madero Muñoz	PAN	Quintana Roo	Pedro Joaquín Coldwell	PRI
Chihuahua	Ramón Galindo Noriega	PAN	Quintana Roo	Ludivina Menchaca	PVEM
Chihuahua	Fernando Baeza Meléndez	PRI	Quintana Roo	José Luis García Zalvidea	PRD
Coahuila	José Guillermo Anaya Llamas	PAN	San Luis Potosí	Alejandro Zapata Perogordo	PAN
Coahuila	Ernesto Saro Boardman	PAN	San Luis Potosí	Eugenio Govea Arcos	PAN
Coahuila	Jesús María Ramón Valdés	PRI	San Luis Potosí	Carlos Jiménez Macías	PRI
Colima	Martha Sosa Govea	PAN	Sinaloa	Francisco Labastida Ochoa	PRI
Colima	Jesús Dueñas Llerenas	PAN	Sinaloa	Mario López Valdez	PRI
Colima	Rogelio Rueda Sánchez	PRI	Sinaloa	María Serrano Serrano; Replacing Heriberto Félix Guerra	PAN
Durango	Rodolfo Dorador	PAN	Sonora	Guillermo Padrés Elías	PAN
Durango	Andrés Galván Rivas	PAN	Sonora	Javier Castelo Parada	PAN
Durango	Ricardo Pacheco Rodríguez	PRI	Sonora	Alfonso Elías Serrano	PRI
Guanajuato	Humberto Andrade Quezada	PAN	Tabasco	Arturo Núñez Jiménez	PRD
Guanajuato	Luis Alberto Villarreal García	PAN	Tabasco	Rosalinda López Hernández	PRD
Guanajuato	Francisco Arroyo Vieyra	PRI	Tabasco	Francisco Herrera León	PRI
Guerrero	David Jiménez Rumbo	PRD	Tamaulipas	José Julián Sacramento	PAN
Guerrero	Lázaro Mazón Alonso	PRD	Tamaulipas	Nelly González Aguilar; Replacing Alejandro Galván Garza	PAN
Guerrero	Ángel Aguirre Rivero	PRI	Tamaulipas	Amira Griselda Gómez	PRI
Hidalgo	José Guadarrama Márquez	PRD	Tlaxcala	Alfonso Sánchez Anaya	PRD
Hidalgo	Francisco Xavier Berganza	MC	Tlaxcala	Minerva Hernández Ramos	PRD
Hidalgo	Jesús Murillo Karam	PRI	Tlaxcala	Rosalía Peredo Aguilar	PAN
Jalisco	Eva Contreras Sandoval; Replacing Alberto Cárdenas Jiménez	PAN	Veracruz	Dante Delgado Rannauro	MC
Jalisco	Héctor Pérez Plazola	PAN	Veracruz	Arturo Herviz Reyes	PRD
Jalisco	Ramiro Hernández García	PRI	Veracruz	Juan Bueno Torio	PAN
Mexico State	Yeidckol Polevnsky	PRD	Yucatán	Beatriz Zavala Peniche	PAN
Mexico State	Héctor Miguel Bautista López	PRD	Yucatán	Alfredo Rodríguez y Pacheco	PAN
Mexico State	Ulises Ramírez Núñez	PAN	Yucatán	Cleominio Zoreda Novelo; Replacing Ivonne Ortega Pacheco	PRI
Michoacán	Jesús Garibay García; Replacing Leonel Godoy Rangel	PRD	Zacatecas	Tomás Torres Mercado	PRD
Michoacán	Silvano Aureoles Conejo	PRD	Zacatecas	Antonio Mejía Haro	PRD
Michoacán	Marko Antonio Cortés Mendoza	PAN	Zacatecas	José Isabel Trejo	PAN
Morelos	Adrián Rivera Pérez	PAN	Federal District	Pablo Gómez Alvarez	PRD
Morelos	Martha Leticia Rivera Cisneros; Replacing Sergio Álvarez Mata	PAN	Federal District	René Arce Islas	PRD
Morelos	Graco Ramírez	PRD	Federal District	Federico Döring	PAN

==== Plurinominal Senators ====
Senator	Party	Senator	Party	Senator	Party
Ángel Alonso Díaz Caneja	PAN	Santiago Creel	PAN	Ricardo García Cervantes	PAN
Adriana González Carrillo	PAN	José González Morfin	PAN	Augusto César Leal Angulo	PAN
Ramón Muñoz Gutiérrez	PAN	Jorge Ocejo Moreno	PAN	Teresa Ortuño Gurza	PAN
Gabriela Ruiz del Rincón	PAN	Ricardo Torres Origel	PAN	Carlos Humberto Aceves	PRI
Manlio Fabio Beltrones	PRI	Rosario Green	PRI	Jorge Mendoza Garza	PRI
María de los Angeles Moreno	PRI	Heladio Ramírez	PRI	Claudia Corichi García	PRD
Rosario Ibarra de Piedra	PT	Ricardo Monreal Ávila	PRD	Carlos Navarrete Ruiz	PRD
María Rojo	PRD	Carlos Sotelo García	PRD	Alberto Anaya	PT. Dxdxdx
Alejandro González Yáñez	PT	José Luis Lobato	MC	Luis Walton	MC
Jorge Legorreta Ordorica	PVEM	Francisco Agundis Arias	PVEM	Arturo Escobar y Vega	PVEM
Javier Orozco Gómez; Replacing Irma Ortega Fajardo	PVEM	Irma Martínez Manríquez; Replacing Rafael Ochoa Guzmán	PANAL		

=== Senate Bodies ===
The Senate has 2 directive bodies: The Executive Board and The Politic Coordination Committee. The bodies are listed as follows:

- Executive Board of the Senate
  - President of the Senate:
    - Manlio Fabio Beltrones (PRI, Party list Senator)
  - Vice Presidents of the Senate:
    - Francisco Arroyo Vieyra (PRI, Guanajuato)
    - Ricardo Torres Origel (PAN, Party list Senator)
    - Yeidckol Polevnsky (PRD, Mexico State)
  - Secretaries:
    - Cleominio Zoreda Novelo (PRI, Yucatan)
    - Rodolfo Dorador (PAN, Durango)
    - Claudia Corichi García (PRD, Party list Senator)
    - Ludivina Menchaca (PVEM, Quintana Roo)
- Politic Coordination Committee of the Senate
  - President of the Committee:
    - Santiago Creel (PAN, Party list Senator)
  - Vocals:
    - Manlio Fabio Beltrones (PRI, Party list Senator)
    - Carlos Navarrete Ruiz (PRD. Party list Senator)
    - Francisco Agundis Arias (PVEM, Party list Senator)
    - Dante Delgado Rannauro (CD, Veracruz)
    - Humberto Aguilar Coronado (PAN, Puebla)
    - Felipe González González (PAN, Aguascalientes)
    - Melquiades Morales (PRI, Puebla)

=== Deputies by state and electoral district ===
State	District	Deputy	Party	State	District	Deputy	Party
Aguascalientes	1	Pedro Armendáriz García	PAN	Mexico State	26	Armando Enríquez Flores	PAN
Aguascalientes	2	Ernesto Ruiz Velasco	PAN	Mexico State	27	Xavier Maawad Robert	PAN
Aguascalientes	3	Alma Hilda Medina Macías	PAN	Mexico State	28	Rogelio Muñoz Serna	PRI
Baja California	1	Francisco Rueda Gómez	PAN	Mexico State	29	Emilio Ulloa Pérez	PRD
Baja California	2	Dolores Manuell Gómez Angulo	PAN	Mexico State	30	Alliet Mariana Bautista	PRD
Baja California	3	Héctor Ramos Covarrubias	PAN	Mexico State	31	Hugo de la Rosa García	PRD
Baja California	4	Ricardo Franco Cázares	PAN	Mexico State	32	Alma Lilia Luna Munguía	PRD
Baja California	5	Antonio Valladolid Rodríguez	PAN	Mexico State	33	Jaime Espejel Lazcano	PRD
Baja California	6	Luis Rodolfo Enríquez Martínez	PAN	Mexico State	34	Oscar González Morán	PAN
Baja California	7	Francisco Javier Paredes Rodríguez	PAN	Mexico State	35	Alejandro Olivares	PRI
Baja California	8	Mirna Rincón Vargas	PAN	Mexico State	36	Isael Villa Villa	PRI
Baja California Sur	1	Juan Adolfo Orcí Martínez	PRD	Mexico State	37	Francisco Santos Arreola	PRD
Baja California Sur	2	Víctor Manuel Lizárraga Peraza	PRD	Mexico State	38	Juan Darío Arreola Calderón	PRD
Campeche	1	Víctor Manuel Méndez Lanz	PRI	Mexico State	39	Juan Manuel San Martín Hernández	PRD
Campeche	2	Arturo Martínez Rocha	PRI	Mexico State	40	Juan Victoria Alva	PAN
Chiapas	1	Yary Gebhardt	PRI	Michoacán	1	Antonio Soto Sánchez	PRD
Chiapas	2	Víctor Ortíz del Carpio	PRI	Michoacán	2	Rafael Villicaña García	PRD
Chiapas	3	Elmar Díaz Solórzano	PRI	Michoacán	3	Mario Vallejo Estévez	PRD
Chiapas	4	Andrés Carballo Bustamante	PRI	Michoacán	4	Felipe Díaz Garibay	PAN
Chiapas	5	Jorge Mario Lescieur Talavera	PRI	Michoacán	5	Ramón Ceja Romero	PAN
Chiapas	6	Héctor Narcia Álvarez	PRD	Michoacán	6	Raúl Ríos Gamboa	PRD
Chiapas	7	Fernel Gálvez Rodríguez	PRD	Michoacán	7	Humberto Alonso Razo	PRD
Chiapas	8	Arnulfo Cordero Alfonzo	PRI	Michoacán	8	Daniel Chávez García	PAN
Chiapas	9	Carlos Morales Vázquez	PRD	Michoacán	9	Fausto Mendoza Maldonado	PRD
Chiapas	10	Martín Ramos Castellanos	PRD	Michoacán	10	José Luis Espinosa Piña	PAN
Chiapas	11	Anuario Luis Herrera Solís	PT	Michoacán	11	Francisco Márquez Tinoco	PRD
Chiapas	12	Antonio Díaz Athié	PRI	Michoacán	12	Irineo Mendoza Mendoza	PRD
Chihuahua	1	Enrique Serrano Escobar	PRI	Morelos	1	Enrique Iragorri Durán	PAN
Chihuahua	2	Lilia Merodio Reza	PRI	Morelos	2	Demetrio Román Isidoro	PAN
Chihuahua	3	Cruz Pérez Cuéllar	PAN	Morelos	3	Rafael Franco Melgarejo	PRD
Chihuahua	4	Víctor Valencia de los Santos	PRI	Morelos	4	José Amado Orihuela Trejo	PRI
Chihuahua	5	Felipe González Ruiz	PAN	Morelos	5	José Víctor Sánchez Trujillo	PAN
Chihuahua	6	Emilio Flores Domínguez	PAN	Nayarit	1	Sergio González García	PRI
Chihuahua	7	Israel Beltrán Montes	PRI	Nayarit	2	María Eugenia Jiménez Valenzuela	PRD
Chihuahua	8	Carlos Reyes López	PAN	Nayarit	3	Sergio Sandoval Paredes	PRI
Chihuahua	9	César Duarte Jáquez	PRI	Nuevo León	1	Martha García Müller	PAN
Coahuila	1	Humberto García Reyes	PAN	Nuevo León	2	Rodrigo Medina de la Cruz	PRI
Coahuila	2	Javier Guerrero García	PRI	Nuevo León	3	José Luis Murillo Torres	PAN
Coahuila	3	Rolando Rivero Rivero	PAN	Nuevo León	4	Gustavo Ramírez Villarreal	PAN
Coahuila	4	Jericó Abramo Masso	PRI	Nuevo León	5	Gustavo Caballero Camargo	PRI
Coahuila	5	Carlos Augusto Bracho González	PAN	Nuevo León	6	Juan Enrique Barrios Rodríguez	PAN
Coahuila	6	Jesús de León Tello	PAN	Nuevo León	7	Cristian Castaño Contreras	PAN
Coahuila	7	Oscar Mohamar Dainitín	PAN	Nuevo León	8	Javier Zambrano Elizondo	PAN
Colima	1	Esmeralda Cárdenas Sánchez	PAN	Nuevo León	9	Ramón Salas López	PRI
Colima	2	Nabor Ochoa López	PAN	Nuevo León	10	Juan Manuel Villanueva Arjona	PAN
Federal District	1	Andrés Lozano Lozano	PRD	Nuevo León	11	Juan Francisco Rivera Bedoya	PRI
Federal District	2	Javier González Garza	PRD	Nuevo León	12	Juan Manuel Parás González	PRI
Federal District	3	Ramón Pacheco Llanes	PRD	Oaxaca	1	Daniel Dehesa Mora	PRD
Federal District	4	Lourdes Alonso Flores	PRD	Oaxaca	2	Patricia Villanueva Abraján	PRI
Federal District	5	Maricela Contreras Julián	PRD	Oaxaca	3	Daisy Hernández Gaytán	PRD
Federal District	6	María Elena Torres Baltazar	PRD	Oaxaca	4	Carlos Martínez Martínez	PRD
Federal District	7	Juan Nicasio Guerra Ochoa	PRD	Oaxaca	5	Carlos Altamirano Toledo	PRD
Federal District	8	Armando Barreiro Pérez	PRD	Oaxaca	6	Rosa Elia Romero Guzmán	PRD
Federal District	9	Victorio Montalvo Rojas	PRD	Oaxaca	7	Jorge Toledo Luis	PRI
Federal District	10	María Gabriela González Martínez	PAN	Oaxaca	8	José Luis Varela Lagunas	MC
Federal District	11	Víctor Hugo García Rodríguez	PRD	Oaxaca	9	Othón Cuevas Córdova	PRD
Federal District	12	José Alfonso Suárez del Real	PRD	Oaxaca	10	Benjamín Hernández Silva	PRD
Federal District	13	Pablo Trejo Pérez	PRD	Oaxaca	11	Joaquín de los Santos Molina	PRD
Federal District	14	Higinio Chávez García	PRD	Puebla	1	Alberto Amador Leal	PRI
Federal District	15	Manuel Minjares Jiménez	PAN	Puebla	2	María Esther Jiménez Ramos	PAN
Federal District	16	Valentina Batres Guadarrama	PRD	Puebla	3	José Guillermo Fuentes Ortiz	PAN
Federal District	17	Aleida Alavez Ruiz	PRD	Puebla	4	Wenceslao Herrera Coyac	PRI
Federal District	18	David Mendoza Arellano	PRD	Puebla	5	Apolonio Méndez Meneses	PAN
Federal District	19	Silvia Oliva Fragoso	PRD	Puebla	6	Arturo Flores Grande	PAN
Federal District	20	Efraín Morales Sánchez	PRD	Puebla	7	José Luis Contreras Coeto	PAN
Federal District	21	Alejandro Sánchez Camacho	PRD	Puebla	8	Antonio Vasconcelos Rueda	PAN
Federal District	22	Víctor Varela López	PRD	Puebla	9	Violeta Lagunes Viveros	PAN
Federal District	23	Adrián Pedrozo Castillo	PRD	Puebla	10	María del Carmen Parra Jiménez	PAN
Federal District	24	Gerardo Villanueva Albarrán	PRD	Puebla	11	Alfonso Othón Bello Pérez	PAN
Federal District	25	Miguel Ángel Solares Chávez	PRD	Puebla	12	Antonio Sánchez Díaz de Rivera	PAN
Federal District	26	José Luis Gutiérrez Calzadilla	PRD	Puebla	13	José Guillermo Velázquez Gutiérrez	PAN
Federal District	27	Guadalupe Flores Salazar	PRD	Puebla	14	Jorge Estefan Chidiac	PRI
Durango	1	Luis Enrique Benítez Ojeda	PRI	Puebla	15	René Lezama Aradillas	PAN
Durango	2	Juana Leticia Herrera Ale	PRI	Puebla	16	Mario Mendoza Cortés	PRI
Durango	3	José Rubén Escajeda	PRI	Querétaro	1	José Ignacio Rubio Chávez	PAN
Durango	4	Jorge Alejandro Salum del Palacio	PRI	Querétaro	2	Francisco Domínguez Servien	PAN
Guanajuato	1	Francisco Javier Murillo Flores	PAN	Querétaro	3	María Jiménez del Castillo	PAN
Guanajuato	2	Martín Stefanonni Mazzocco	PAN	Querétaro	4	Alejandro Delgado Oscoy	PAN
Guanajuato	3	Ernesto Oviedo Oviedo	PAN	Quintana Roo	1	Sara Latife Ruiz Chávez	PRI
Guanajuato	4	Margarita Arenas Guzmán	PAN	Quintana Roo	2	Eduardo Espinosa Abuxapqui	PRI
Guanajuato	5	Éctor Jaime Ramírez Barba	PAN	Quintana Roo	3	Yolanda Garmendia Hernández	PAN
Guanajuato	6	Adriana Rodríguez Vizcarra	PAN	San Luis Potosí	1	Antonio Medellín Varela	PAN
Guanajuato	7	Jaime Verdín Saldaña	PAN	San Luis Potosí	2	Agustín Leura González	PAN
Guanajuato	8	Antonio Vega Corona	PAN	San Luis Potosí	3	Enrique Rodríguez Uresti	PAN
Guanajuato	9	Marcela Cuen Garibi	PAN	San Luis Potosí	4	David Lara Compeán	PAN
Guanajuato	10	Artemio Torres Gómez	PAN	San Luis Potosí	5	Beatriz Eugenia García Reyes	PAN
Guanajuato	11	Ramón Landeros González	PAN	San Luis Potosí	6	Silvia Degante Romero	PAN
Guanajuato	12	Rubí Laura López Silva	PAN	San Luis Potosí	7	José Guadalupe Rivera Rivera	PAN
Guanajuato	13	Ramón Lemus Muñoz	PAN	Sinaloa	1	Mayra Gisela Peñuelas Acuña	PRI
Guanajuato	14	Martín Malagón Ríos	PAN	Sinaloa	2	Gerardo Vargas Landeros	PRI
Guerrero	1	Daniel Torres García	PRD	Sinaloa	3	Gilberto Ojeda Camacho	PRI
Guerrero	2	Modesto Brito González	PRD	Sinaloa	4	Ramón Barajas López	PRI
Guerrero	3	Amador Campos Aburto	PRD	Sinaloa	5	Eduardo Ortiz Hernández	PAN
Guerrero	4	Ramón Almonte Borja	PRD	Sinaloa	6	Daniel Amador Gaxiola	PRI
Guerrero	5	Víctor Aguirre Alcaide	PRD	Sinaloa	7	Manuel Patrón Montalvo	PRI
Guerrero	6	Marco Matías Alonso	PRD	Sinaloa	8	Carlos Felton	PAN
Guerrero	7	Carlos Sánchez Barrios	PRD	Sonora	1	Inés Palafox Núñez	PAN
Guerrero	8	Odilón Romero Gutiérrez	PRD	Sonora	2	Carlos Alberto Navarro Sugich	PAN
Guerrero	9	César Flores Maldonado	PRD	Sonora	3	Luis Gerardo Serrato Castell	PAN
Hidalgo	1	Joel Guerrero Juárez	PRI	Sonora	4	Carlos Zatarain González	PRI
Hidalgo	2	José Edmundo Ramírez Martínez	PRI	Sonora	5	Luis Fernando Rodríguez Ahumada	PAN
Hidalgo	3	Sergio Hernández Hernández	PRD	Sonora	6	Armando Félix Holguín	PAN
Hidalgo	4	María Oralia Vega Ortíz	PRI	Sonora	7	Gustavo Mendívil Amparán	PRI
Hidalgo	5	Fernando Moctezuma Pereda	PRI	Tabasco	1	Rafael Sánchez Cabrales	PRD
Hidalgo	6	Daniel Ludlow Kuri	PAN	Tabasco	2	Francisco Sánchez Ramos	PRD
Hidalgo	7	Miguel Ángel Peña Sánchez	PRD	Tabasco	3	Moisés Dagdug Lutzow	PRD
Jalisco	1	Gustavo Macías Zambrano	PAN	Tabasco	4	Fernando Mayans Canabal	PRD
Jalisco	2	Martha Angélica Romo Jiménez	PAN	Tabasco	5	Silbestre Álvarez Ramón	PRD
Jalisco	3	José Antonio Muñoz Serrano	PAN	Tabasco	6	Mónica Fernández Balboa	PRD
Jalisco	4	Jorge Quintero Bello	PAN	Tamaulipas	1	Horacio Garza Garza	PRI
Jalisco	5	Leobardo Curiel Preciado	PAN	Tamaulipas	2	Raúl García Vivián	PAN
Jalisco	6	Joel Arellano Arellano	PAN	Tamaulipas	3	Omeheira López Reyna	PAN
Jalisco	7	Carlos René Sánchez Gil	PAN	Tamaulipas	4	Carlos Alberto García González	PAN
Jalisco	8	Miguel Ángel Monraz Ibarra	PAN	Tamaulipas	5	Miguel Ángel González Salum	PRI
Jalisco	9	Fabián Montes Sánchez	PAN	Tamaulipas	6	Enrique Cárdenas	PRI
Jalisco	10	Omar Borboa Becerra	PAN	Tamaulipas	7	Beatriz Collado Lara	PAN
Jalisco	11	Alonso Lizaola de la Torre	PAN	Tamaulipas	8	Luis Alonso Mejía García	PAN
Jalisco	12	Mario Moreno Álvarez	PAN	Tlaxcala	1	José Alejandro Aguilar López	PAN
Jalisco	13	José de Jesús Solano Muñoz	PAN	Tlaxcala	2	Adolfo Escobar Jardinez	PAN
Jalisco	14	Gildardo Guerrero Torres	PAN	Tlaxcala	3	Alberto Amaro Corona	PRD
Jalisco	15	Gerardo Amezola Fonseca	PAN	Veracruz	1	Pedro Pulido Pecero	PAN
Jalisco	16	Francisco Javier Plascencia Alonso	PAN	Veracruz	2	María del Carmen Pinete Vargas	PRI
Jalisco	17	Francisco Javier Gudiño Ortíz	PAN	Veracruz	3	Antonio Laviada Hernández	PAN
Jalisco	18	José Nicolás Morales Ramos	PAN	Veracruz	4	Ángel Deschamps Falcón	PAN
Jalisco	19	Salvador Barajas del Toro	PRI	Veracruz	5	Antonio del Valle Toca	PAN
Mexico State	1	Jesús Alcántara Núñez	PRI	Veracruz	6	José Manuel del Río Virgen	MC
Mexico State	2	Juan Abad de Jesús	MC	Veracruz	7	José de la Torre Sánchez	PAN
Mexico State	3	Oscar Cárdenas Monroy	PRI	Veracruz	8	Marcos Salas Contreras	PAN
Mexico State	4	Constantino Acosta Dávila	PAN	Veracruz	9	Adolfo Mota Hernández	PRI
Mexico State	5	José Antonio Saavedra Coronel	PRD	Veracruz	10	Elizabeth Morales García	PRI
Mexico State	6	Santiago López Becerra	PRD	Veracruz	11	Gloria Rasgado Corsi	PRD
Mexico State	7	Salvador Arredondo Ibarra	PAN	Veracruz	12	María Victoria Gutiérrez Lagunes	PAN
Mexico State	8	Francisco Martínez Martínez	PRD	Veracruz	13	Agustín Mollinedo Hernández	PAN
Mexico State	9	Elda Gómez Lugo	PRI	Veracruz	14	Robinson Uscanga Cruz	MC
Mexico State	10	Octavio Martínez Vargas	PRD	Veracruz	15	Gerardo Lagunes Gallina	PRI
Mexico State	11	Salvador Ruiz Sánchez	PRD	Veracruz	16	Mauricio Duck Núñez	PAN
Mexico State	12	Rafael Ramos Becerril	MC	Veracruz	17	Osiel Castro de la Rosa	PAN
Mexico State	13	Maribel Alva Olvera	PRD	Veracruz	18	Pedro Montalvo Gómez	PRI
Mexico State	14	Carlos Madrazo Limón	PAN	Veracruz	19	Nemesio Domínguez Domínguez	PRI
Mexico State	15	Alejandro Landero Gutiérrez	PAN	Veracruz	20	Gregorio Barradas Miravete	PAN
Mexico State	16	Raciel Pérez Cruz	PRD	Veracruz	21	Juan Darío Lemarroy Martínez	PRD
Mexico State	17	Hugo Eduardo Martínez Padilla	PRD	Yucatán	1	Joaquín Díaz Mena	PAN
Mexico State	18	Claudia Sánchez Juárez	PAN	Yucatán	2	José Luis Blanco Pajón	PRI
Mexico State	19	Mario Enrique del Toro	PRD	Yucatán	3	María Sofía Castro Romero	PAN
Mexico State	20	Martín Zepeda Hernández	PRD	Yucatán	4	Martín Ramírez Pech	PAN
Mexico State	21	Edgar Olvera Higuera	PAN	Yucatán	5	Gerardo Escaroz Soler	PAN
Mexico State	22	Moisés Alcalde Virgen	PAN	Zacatecas	1	Susana Monreal Ávila	PRD
Mexico State	23	Mercedes Colín Guadarrama	PRI	Zacatecas	2	Andrés Bermúdez Viramontes	PAN
Mexico State	24	Jorge Godoy Cárdenas	MC	Zacatecas	3	Raymundo Cárdenas	PRD
Mexico State	25	Alberto López Rojas	PRD	Zacatecas	4	Francisco Javier Calzada Vázquez	PRD

==== Plurinominal Deputies ====
State	Deputy	Party	State	Deputy	Party
Aguascalientes	Francisco Dávila García	PAN	Mexico State	Alan Notholt Guerrero	PVEM
Aguascalientes	Nelly Hurtado Pérez	PAN	Mexico State	Gustavo Parra Noriega	PAN
Aguascalientes	Lorena Martínez Rodríguez	PRI	Mexico State	Laura Angélica Rojas Hernández	PAN
Aguascalientes	Sergio Augusto López Ramírez	PVEM	Mexico State	Juan Ignacio Samperio	PRD
Aguascalientes	Silvia Luna Rodríguez	PANAL	Mexico State	Alejandro Sánchez Domínguez	PAN
Aguascalientes	Beatriz Manrique Guevara	PVEM	Mexico State	Venancio Luis Sánchez	PRD
Aguascalientes	Héctor Hugo Olivares Ventura	PRI	Mexico State	Juan Manuel Sandoval Munguia	PAN
Aguascalientes	Antonio Ortega Martínez	PRD	Mexico State	Ramón Valdés Chávez	MC
Baja California	Joel Ayala Almeida	PRI	Mexico State	Joaquín Vela González	PT
Baja California	David Maldonado González	PAN	Mexico State	Verónica Velasco	PVEM
Baja California	Carlos Alberto Torres Torres	PAN	Michoacán	María Elena Álvarez Bernal	PAN
Campeche	Aracely Escalante Jasso	PRI	Michoacán	Miguel Ángel Arellano Pulido	PRD
Campeche	Jorge Nordhausen	PAN	Michoacán	Antonio Berber Martínez	PAN
Campeche	Layda Elena Sansores	MC	Michoacán	Erick López Barriga	PRD
Chiapas	Martha Cecilia Díaz Gordillo	PAN	Michoacán	María Esperanza Morelos Borja	PAN
Chiapas	Rutilio Escandón	PRD	Michoacán	Concepción Ojeda Hernández	PRD
Chiapas	Justiniano González Betancourt	PAN	Michoacán	José Ascención Orihuela	PRI
Chiapas	Areli Madrid Tovilla	PRI	Michoacán	Jesús Reyna García	PRI
Chiapas	Holly Matus Toledo	PRD	Michocán	Rosa Elva Soriano Sánchez	PRD
Chiapas	Abundio Peregrino García	PT	Michoacán	Yadhira Yvette Tamayo Herrera	PAN
Chihuahua	Rubén Aguilar Jiménez	PT	Michoacán	Juan Carlos Velasco Pérez	PRI
Chihuahua	María Eugenia Campos Galván	PAN	Morelos	Javier Bolaños Aguilar	PAN
Chihuahua	Jacinto Gómez Pasillas	PANAL	Morelos	Adriana Díaz Contreras	PRD
Chihuahua	Soledad Limas Frescas	PAN	Morelos	Javier Estrada González	PVEM
Coahuila	Rogelio Carbajal Tejada	PAN	Morelos	Samuel Palma César	PRI
Coahuila	Humberto Dávila Esquivel	PANAL	Morelos	Adriana Vieyra Olivares	PAN
Coahuila	Jesús Flores Morfín	PAN	Nayarit	Patricia Castillo Romero	MC
Coahuila	Dora Martínez Valero	PAN	Nayarit	Jaime Cervantes Rivera	PT
Coahuila	Ana Teresa Velázquez Beeck	PVEM	Nayarit	Nohelia Ibarra Fránquez	PRD
Coahuila	Jorge Zermeño Infante	PAN	Nayarit	Delber Medina Rodríguez	PAN
Colima	Delio Hernández Valadés	PASD	Nayarit	Miguel Ángel Navarro	PRD
Colima	Graciela Larios Rivas	PRI	Nayarit	Alfredo Ríos Camarena	PRI
Colima	Joel Padilla Peña	PT	Nuevo León	Ricardo Canavati Tafich	PRI
Colima	Jorge Luis Preciado	PAN	Nuevo León	Ricardo Cantú Garza	PT
Federal District	Pablo Leopoldo Arreola Ortega	PT	Nuevo León	José Martín López Cisneros	PAN
Federal District	Aída Marina Arvizu Rivas	PASD	Nuevo León	Marco Orozco Ruiz Velasco	PAN
Federal District	Obdulio Ávila Mayo	PAN	Nuevo León	Ana María Ramírez Cerda	PVEM
Federal District	Raúl Cervantes Andrade	PRI	Oaxaca	Diódoro Carrasco Altamirano	PAN
Federal District	Alejandro Chanona	MC	Oaxaca	Alberto Esteva Salinas	MC
Federal District	Claudia Cruz Santiago	PRD	Oaxaca	Antonio Xavier López Adame	PVEM
Federal District	Adrián Fernández Cabrera	PAN	Oaxaca	Humberto López Lena	MC
Federal District	Jorge Emilio González Martínez	PVEM	Oaxaca	María Mercedes Maciel Ortíz	PT
Federal District	Benjamín González Roaro	PAN	Oaxaca	José Murat	PRI
Federal District	José Jácques y Medina	PRD	Oaxaca	Ismael Ordaz Jiménez	PRI
Federal District	Miguel Ángel Jiménez Godínez	PANAL	Oaxaca	Irma Piñeyro Arias	PANAL
Federal District	Christian Martín Lujano Nicolás	PAN	Puebla	José Antonio Díaz García	PAN
Federal District	Blanca Luna Becerril	PANAL	Puebla	Francisco Fraile	PAN
Federal District	María Elena Noriega Blanco	PAN	Puebla	Neftalí Garzón Contreras	PRD
Federal District	Rosario Ortíz Magallón	PRD	Querétaro	José Luis Aguilera Rico	MC
Federal District	Beatriz Pagés Rebollar	PRI	Querétaro	Jesús Arredondo Velázquez	PAN
Federal District	Santiago Pedro Cortés	PASD	Querétaro	Mauricio Ortiz Proal	PRI
Federal District	David Sánchez Camacho	PRD	Querétaro	Alberto Vázquez Martínez	PAN
Federal District	Eduardo Sánchez Hernández	PRI	Quintana Roo	Addy Joaquín Coldwell	PAN
Federal District	Faustino Soto Ramos	PRD	San Luis Potosí	Liliana Carbajal Méndez	PAN
Federal District	Martha Tagle Martínez	MC	San Luis Potosí	Leticia Díaz de León Torres	PAN
Federal District	Cuauhtémoc Velasco Oliva	MC	San Luis Potosí	Jesús Ramírez Stabros	PRI
Federal District	Ruth Zavaleta Salgado	PRD	San Luis Potosí	Sara Isabel Castellanos Cortés	PVEM
Durango	Samuel Aguilar Solís	PRI	Sinaloa	Alma Edwviges Alcaraz	PAN
Durango	José Rosas Aispuro	PRI	Sinaloa	Gloria Valenzuela García	PAN
Durango	José Antonio Arévalo González	PVEM	Sinaloa	Diego Aguilar Acuña	PRI
Durango	Juan de Dios Castro Muñoz	PAN	Sinaloa	Erika Larregui Nagel	PVEM
Durango	Patricia Chozas y Chozas	PVEM	Sinaloa	Manuel Cárdenas Fonseca	PANAL
Durango	Lourdes Quiñones Canales	PRI	Sonora	Gerardo Aranda Orozco	PAN
Guanajuato	Carlos Chaurand	PRI	Sonora	María Mercedes Corral Aguilar	PAN
Guanajuato	Elia Hernández Núñez	PAN	Sonora	David Figueroa Ortega	PAN
Guanajuato	Soledad López Torres	PRD	Sonora	Héctor Larios Córdova	PAN
Guanajuato	Leonardo Magallón Arceo	PAN	Sonora	Carlos Ernesto Navarro López	PRD
Guanajuato	María del Pilar Ortega Martínez	PAN	Sonora	Carlos Armando Biebrich	PRI
Guanajuato	Rodolfo Solís Parga	PT	Tabasco	Gerardo Priego Tapia	PAN
Guerrero	Efraín Arizmendi Uribe	PAN	Tabasco	Juan José Rodríguez Prats	PAN
Guerrero	Félix Castellanos Hernández	MC	Tabasco	Pedro Landero López	PRD
Guerrero	Cuauhtémoc Sandoval Ramírez	PRD	Tabasco	Roberto Mendoza Flores	PRD
Guerrero	Evodio Velázquez Aguirre	PRD	Tabasco	Alfonso Izquierdo Bustamante	PRI
Guerrero	Jesús Humberto Zazueta Aguilar	PRD	Tamaulipas	Gustavo Cárdenas Gutiérrez	PAN
Hidalgo	Isidro Pedraza Chávez	PRD	Tamaulipas	César Augusto Verástegui Ostos	PAN
Hidalgo	Marco Antonio Peyrot Solís	PAN	Tamaulipas	Marco Antonio Bernal	PRI
Hidalgo	Gerardo Sosa Castelán	PRI	Tamaulipas	Tomás Gloria Requena	PRI
Jalisco	Alfredo Barba Hernández	PRI	Tlaxcala	Adriana Dávila Fernández	PAN
Jalisco	Itzcóatl Tonatiuh Bravo Padilla	PRD	Tlaxcala	Alejandro Martínez Hernández	PRD
Jalisco	Patricio Flores Sandoval	PRI	Tlaxcala	Mariano González Zarur	PRI
Jalisco	Lucía Mendoza Morales	PAN	Veracruz	Gerardo Buganza	PAN
Jalisco	Rocío Morgan Franco	PAN	Veracruz	Abel Ignacio Cuevas Melo	PAN
Jalisco	Héctor Padilla Gutiérrez	PRI	Veracruz	José Antonio Almazán González	PRD
Jalisco	Raúl Alejandro Padilla Orozco	PAN	Veracruz	Irene Aragón Castillo	PRD
Jalisco	Ricardo Rodríguez Jiménez	PAN	Veracruz	Cuitlahuac Condado Escamilla	PRD
Jalisco	Yolanda Rodríguez Ramírez	PRI	Veracruz	Celso Pulido Santiago	PRD
Jalisco	Mario Alberto Salazar Madera	PAN	Veracruz	Ricardo Aldana Prieto	PRI
Mexico State	Mónica Arriola Gordillo	PANAL	Veracruz	Roberto Badillo Martínez	PRI
Mexico State	César Camacho Quiroz	PRI	Veracruz	Daniel Pérez Valdés	PRI
Mexico State	Elías Cárdenas Márquez	MC	Veracruz	Diego Cobo Terrazas	PVEM
Mexico State	Ariel Castillo Nájera	PANAL	Veracruz	Francisco Elizondo Garrido	PVEM
Mexico State	Elsa Conde Rodríguez	PASD	Veracruz	Guadalupe García Noriega	PVEM
Mexico State	Tomás del Toro del Villar	PAN	Veracruz	María del Carmen Salvatori Bronca	MC
Mexico State	Silvano Garay Ulloa	PT	Veracruz	Eduardo de la Torre Jaramillo	PASD
Mexico State	Armando García Méndez	PASD	Yucatán	Lizbeth Medina Rodríguez	PAN
Mexico State	Silvio Gómez Leyva	PAN	Yucatán	Emilio Gamboa Patrón	PRI
Mexico State	Martha Hilda González Calderón	PRI	Yucatán	Carlos Rojas Gutiérrez	PRI
Mexico State	Pilar Guerrero Rubio	PVEM	Zacatecas	Felipe Borrego Estrada	PAN
Mexico State	Javier Hernández Manzanares	PRD	Zacatecas	María Dolores González Sánchez	PAN
Mexico State	Ana Yurixi Leyva Piñón	PRD	Zacatecas	Aurora Cervantes Rodríguez	PRD

==== Substitute Deputies ====
Substitute	Replacing:	Took office
Teresa Alcocer y Gasca	Joaquín Díaz Mena	23 April 2009
Fidel Antuña Batista	María Sofía Castro Romero	17 September 2008
Héctor Arenas Sánchez	Raciel Pérez Cruz	30 April 2009
María Argüelles Arellano	Felipe Borrego Estrada	11 December 2008
Juan Carlos Barragán	Javier Hernández Manzanares	28 April 2009
Pascual Bellizzia Rosique	María Guadalupe García Noriega	30 April 2008
Lucía Beristaín	Silvio Gómez Leyva	3 March 2009
Federico Bernal Frausto	Andrés Bermúdez Viramontes	17 February 2009
Esveida Bravo Martínez	Faustino Javier Estrada	26 March 2009
Claudia Caballero Chávez	Marco Orozco	31 October 2006
Miriam Cárdenas de la Torre	Cruz Pérez Cuéllar	28 April 2009
Alma Xóchil Cardona	Luis Rodolfo Enríquez	6 December 2007
Susana Carrasco Cárdenas	Daniel Chávez García	10 February 2009
Fortino Carrillo Sandoval	Gustavo Macías Zambrano	1 February 2009
Secundino Catarino Crispín	Amador Campos Aburto	28 August 2008
Efrén Cerezo Torres	Raúl Cervantes Andrade	14 April 2009
José Luis Cerrillo	José Jesús Reyna	30 August 2007
Luz Virginia Cortés	Alberto Vázquez Martínez	14 April 2009
Jorge Luis de la Garza	Rodrigo Medina De la Cruz	30 August 2007
Sonia del Villar Sosa	Daniel Ludlow Kuri	11 September 2008
Rosaura Denegre Vaught	José Manuel Minjares Jiménez	5 February 2008
Raymundo Escamilla	Juan Arreola Calderón	23 April 2009
María Fernández Ugarte	Jorge Zermeño Infante	3 September 2007
Alain Ferrat	Francisco Elizondo Garrido	2008
Mario Franco Valencia	Claudia Sánchez Juárez	28 April 2009
Octavio Fuentes Téllez	Víctor Leopoldo Valencia	29 March 2007
Erika Galván Rivas	Constantino Acosta Dávila	21 April 2009
Rosa Elena Galván Valles	Juan de Dios Castro	1 February 2009
Moisés Gil Ramírez	Gerardo Villanueva Albarrán	10 March 2009
Ernesto Javier Gómez Barrales	Violeta del Pilar Gómez	2 April 2009
Jesús Gónzález Macías	Ana María Ramírez Cerda	8 February 2007
Facundo González Miranda	Francisco Martínez Martínez	24 February 2009
Daniel Gurrión Matías	Jorge Toledo Luis	1 February 2009
Miguel Ángel Gutiérrez Aguilar	Omar Antonio Borboa	19 June 2008
Octavio Klimek Alcaraz	Carlos Sánchez Barrio	28 August 2008
Guillermina López Balbuena	Mario Mendoza Cortés	4 October 2007
Josefina López Espinosa	Alejandro Landero Gutiérrez	28 April 2009
Carlos Rodríguez Guevara	Rubí Laura López Silva	
Magdalena Macedo Domínguez	Oscar González Morán	28 April 2009
Miguel Ángel Macedo Escartín	Silvia Oliva Fragoso	10 February 2009
Ofelia Malcos Amaro	Adolfo Escobar Jiménez	30 August 2007
Margarita Martínez Bernal	Luis Gustavo Parra Noriega	28 April 2009
Lariza Montiel Luis	Rogelio Carbajal Tejeda	2 September 2008
Marisol Mora Cuevas	Abel Ignacio Cuevas Melo	22 December 2006
Jesús Ricardo Morales Manzo	Jesús Evodio Velázquez	28 August 2008
Mercedes Morales Utrera	Ángel Rafael Deschamps	11 December 2008
Hilda Narváez Bravo	Fernando Quetzalcóatl Moctezuma	24 February 2009
María Dolores Ortega Tzitzihua	Pedro Montalvo Gómez	1 February 2009
Gabriela Ortiz Martínez	Xavier Maawad Robert	21 April 2009
Sagrario Ortíz Montoro	René Lezama Aradillas	2 October 2008
Aníbal Ostoa Ortega	Layda Elena Sansores	2 April 2009
Martha Partida Guzmán	Sergio González García	3 April 2008
Efraín Peña Damacio	Daniel Torres García	28 August 2008
Ismael Peraza Valdez	Aracely Escalante Jasso	14 April 2009
Ana Elisa Pérez Bolaños	Miguel Ángel Jiménez Godínez	1 February 2009
Heriberto Pérez Sánchez	Alberto Pérez Sánchez	23 April 2009
Diana Pérez de Tejada	Alfredo Rivadeneyra	11 September 2008
Gloria María Perroni	Antonio Sánchez Díaz de Rivera	
Manuel Portilla Diéguez	Pilar Guerrero Rubio	24 April 2007
Carlos Alberto Puente Salas	Ana Teresa Velásquez Beeck	21 September 2006
Ivette Jacqueline Ramírez Corral	David Figueroa Ortega	28 August 2008
Carlos Ramírez Ruiz	Mayra Gisela Peñuelas Acuña	28 April 2009
Geraldine Ramírez Zollino	Jorge Emilio González Martínez	10 March 2009
María Isabel Reyes García	Moisés Alcalde Virgen	11 December 2008
Julián Ezequiel Reynoso	Jaime Cervantes Rivera	8 April 2008
Miguel Rivero Acosta	María Oralia Vega Ortiz	24 February 2009
Alejandro Rodríguez Luis	Patricia Chozas y Chozas	11 September 2008
Alicia Rodríguez Martínez	José Amado Orihuela Trejo	4 February 2009
Bibiana Rodríguez	Francisco Domínguez Servién	24 February 2009
María Rodríguez Preciado	Ramón Landeros González	16 April 2009
Dolores Rodríguez Sabido	Edgar Martín Ramírez Pech	31 March 2009
Sergio Rojas Carmona	Emilio Ulloa Pérez	31 March 2009
María Guadalupe Salazar	José Alejandro Aguilar López	26 February 2009
Manuel Salvador Salgado Amador	Erika Larregui	4 October 2007
Salvador Sánchez Peñuelas	Carlos Zatarain	1 February 2009
Josefina Salinas Pérez	Venancio Luis Sánchez	28 August 2008
Angelina Sánchez Valdez	Faustino Soto Ramos	28 August 2008
Jesús Sesma Suárez	Sara Isabel Castellanos	26 April 2007
Sara Shej	Gustavo Adolfo Cárdenas	19 December 2006
Olivia Utrilla Nieto	Enrique Iragorri Durán	1 April 2009
Alejandro Velázquez Lara	Rafael Ramos becerril	14 April 2009
Víctor Manuel Virgen	Patricia Villanueva Abraján	10 February 2009

=== Chamber of Deputies Organs ===
Like the Senate, the Chamber of Deputies has 2 directive organs: The Executive Board and The Political Coordination Committee. The leaders of the Chamber of Deputies are listed as follows:

- Executive Board of the Chamber of Deputies
  - President of the Chamber of Deputies Directive Board:
    - Ruth Zavaleta Salgado (PRD)
  - Vice Speakers of the Chamber:
  - Secretaries:
- Political Coordination Committee of the Chamber of Deputies
  - President of the Committee:
    - Emilio Gamboa Patrón (PRI)
  - Coordinators:
    - Héctors Larios (PAN)
    - Javier González Garza (PRD)
    - Ricardo Cantú (PT)
    - Gloria Lavara (PVEM)
    - Alejandro Chanona (CD)
    - Miguel Ángel Jiménez Godínez (PANAL)
    - Aída Marina Arvizu Rivas (PASDC)

== Members of the LX Legislature by party ==
=== Party strengths in the Chamber of Deputies ===
Summary of the 2 July 2006 Mexican Chamber of Deputies election results
Parties and/or coalitions		Votes	%	FPP	PR	Total seats
National Action Party (Partido Acción Nacional)		13,845,121	33.41	137	69	206
Coalition for the Good of All (Coalición por el Bien de Todos)	Party of the Democratic Revolution (Partido de la Revolución Democrática)	12,013,364	28.99	91	36	127
Coalition for the Good of All (Coalición por el Bien de Todos)	Convergence (Convergencia)	12,013,364	28.99	5	12	17
Coalition for the Good of All (Coalición por el Bien de Todos)	Labour Party (Partido del Trabajo)	12,013,364	28.99	2	10	12
Coalition for the Good of All (Coalición por el Bien de Todos)	No party	12,013,364	28.99	0	1	1
Alliance for Mexico (Alianza por México)	Institutional Revolutionary Party (Partido Revolucionario Institucional)	11,676,585	28.18	65	41	106
Alliance for Mexico (Alianza por México)	Ecologist Green Party of Mexico (Partido Verde Ecologista de México)	11,676,585	28.18	0	17	17
New Alliance Party (Partido Nueva Alianza)		1,883,476	4.55	0	9	9
Social Democratic and Peasant Alternative Party (Partido Alternativa Socialdemócrata y Campesina)		850,989	2.05	0	4	4
Total		41,435,934	100.00	300	200	500
Source: Journal of Democracy

=== Party strengths in the Senate ===
Summary of the 2 July 2006 Mexican Senate election results
Parties and/or coalitions		Votes	%	FPP	FM	PR	Total seats
National Action Party (Partido Acción Nacional)		14,035,503	33.63	32	9	11	52
Coalition for the Good of All (Coalición por el Bien de Todos)	Party of the Democratic Revolution (Partido de la Revolución Democrática)	12,397,008	29.70	22	4	5	31
Coalition for the Good of All (Coalición por el Bien de Todos)	Labour Party (Partido del Trabajo)	12,397,008	29.70	0	0	3	3
Coalition for the Good of All (Coalición por el Bien de Todos)	Convergence (Convergencia)	12,397,008	29.70	0	0	2	2
Alliance for Mexico (Alianza por México)	Institutional Revolutionary Party (Partido Revolucionario Institucional)	11,681,395	27.99	10	19	6	35
Alliance for Mexico (Alianza por México)	Ecologist Green Party of Mexico (Partido Verde Ecologista de México)	11,681,395	27.99	0	0	4	4
New Alliance Party (Partido Nuevo Alianza)		1,688,198	4.04	0	0	1	1
Social Democratic and Peasant Alternative Party (Partido Alternativa Socialdemócrata y Campesina)		795,730	1.91	0	0	0	0
Total		41,739,188	100.00	64	32	32	128
Source: Journal of Democracy

Preceded by LIX Legislature	LX Legislature; 2006 to 2009	Succeeded by LXI Legislature
