= Marco Antonio Peyrot Solís =

Mexican politician (born 1966)

- Born: 6 May 1966 (age 60); Hidalgo, Mexico
- Occupations: Physician and politician
- Political party: PAN

Marco Antonio Peyrot Solís (born 6 May 1966) is a Mexican physician, military officer and politician from the National Action Party. From 2006 to 2009 he served as Deputy of the LX Legislature of the Mexican Congress representing Hidalgo.
