= Lucía Mendoza Morales =

Mexican politician (born 1976)

- Born: 24 October 1976 (age 49); Jalisco, Mexico
- Occupation: Politician
- Political party: PAN

Lucía Susana Mendoza Morales (born 24 October 1976) is a Mexican politician from the National Action Party. From 2006 to 2009 she served as Deputy of the LX Legislature of the Mexican Congress representing Jalisco.
