= Alan Notholt Guerrero =

Mexican politician

- Born: 21 May 1980 (age 46); State of Mexico, Mexico
- Occupation: Politician
- Political party: PVEM

Alan Notholt Guerrero (born 21 May 1980) is a Mexican politician from the Ecologist Green Party of Mexico. From 2006 to 2009 he served as Deputy of the LX Legislature of the Mexican Congress representing the State of Mexico.
