= Sara Shej =

Mexican politician

- Born: 1 August 1944 (age 81); Tamaulipas, Mexico
- Occupation: Politician
- Political party: PAN

Sara Shej Guzmán (born 1 August 1944) is a Mexican politician from the National Action Party. From 2006 to 2009 she served as Deputy of the LX Legislature of the Mexican Congress representing Tamaulipas.
