= Rodolfo Solís Parga =

Mexican politician

- Born: 17 February 1958 (age 68); Chihuahua, Chihuahua, Mexico
- Occupation: Politician
- Political party: PT

Rodolfo Solís Parga (born 17 February 1958) is a Mexican politician from the Labor Party. From 2006 to 2009 he served as Deputy of the LX Legislature of the Mexican Congress representing Guanajuato.
