= Juan Nicasio Guerra =

Mexican politician (born 1954)

Juan Nicasio Guerra Ochoa (born 26 November 1954) is a Mexican politician, affiliated with the Party of the Democratic Revolution (PRD).

Guerra's first degree is in law from the Autonomous University of Sinaloa, and he also holds a master's and a doctorate in psychotherapy. He was a member of the Liga Comunista 23 de septiembre, the Patriotic and Revolutionary Party, the Unified Socialist Party of Mexico, and the Mexican Socialist Party prior to being one of the founding members of the PRD upon its creation in 1989. Within the PRD he has served as the Party State President in Sinaloa (1993–94), Secretary for Electoral Affairs of the National Executive Committee (2002–04), and the party's representative to the Federal Electoral Institute (2004–05).

In 1997, Head of Government of the Federal District Cuauhtémoc Cárdenas Solórzano appointed him Director of Legal and Government Affairs in his cabinet. In 1998 he served as the borough mayor of Milpa Alta.

Guerra Ochoa has served three terms as a federal deputy: he was elected from the PRD's party list to the 54th Congress (1988–91) and to the 56th Congress (1994–97), and for the 60th Congress (2006–09) he was elected to represent the Federal District's Seventh District.

At the start of the 2006–09 Congressional session, Guerra was mentioned as a possible leader of the PRD group in the Chamber of Deputies, but the position went to Javier González Garza.
