= Sergi López =

Sergi López may refer to:

- Sergi López (actor) (born 1965), Spanish actor
- Sergi López Segú (1967–2006), Spanish footballer

== See also ==
- Sergio López (disambiguation)
- Sérgio Lopes (disambiguation)
- Sergi, the given name
- López, the surname
