= Cleominio Zoreda Novelo =

Mexican politician and lawyer

Senator for Yucatán
- In office 30 October 2006 – 31 August 2012
- Preceded by: Ivonne Ortega Pacheco
- Succeeded by: Angélica Araujo Lara

Personal details
- Born: 20 July 1950 (age 75) Mérida, Yucatán, Mexico
- Party: PAN
- Occupation: Senator and lawyer

Renán Cleominio Zoreda Novelo (born 20 July 1950) is a Mexican politician and lawyer affiliated with the PAN. He served as Senator of the LX Legislature of the Mexican Congress representing Yucatán.
