= Morfin =

Morfin or Morfín is a surname. Notable people with the surname include:

- Carlos Morfín (born 1949), Mexican water polo player
- Jesús Flores Morfín (born 1953), Mexican politician
- José González Morfin (born 1954), Mexican politician and lawyer
- Lorenza Morfín (born 1982), Mexican road cyclist

== Fictional characters ==
- Morfin Gaunt, a Harry Potter character
- Mr Morfin, in Dombey and Son
