= Manuel Salvador Salgado Amador =

Mexican politician

- Born: 2 March 1954 (age 72); Baja California Sur, Mexico
- Occupation: Politician
- Political party: PVEM

Manuel Salvador Salgado Amador (born 2 March 1954) is a Mexican politician from the Ecologist Green Party of Mexico. From 2007 to 2009 he served as Deputy of the LX Legislature of the Mexican Congress representing Sinaloa. He previously served in the Congress of Baja California Sur from 1996 to 1999.
