= Antonio Berber Martínez =

Mexican politician

- Born: 13 November 1977 (age 48); Michoacán, Mexico
- Occupation: Politician
- Political party: PAN

Antonio Berber Martínez (born 13 November 1977) is a Mexican politician from the National Action Party. From 2006 to 2009 he served as Deputy of the LX Legislature of the Mexican Congress representing Michoacán.
