= Soledad López Torres =

Mexican politician (born 1952)

- Born: 14 June 1952 (age 73); Guanajuato, Mexico
- Occupation: Politician
- Political party: PRD

María Soledad López Torres (born 14 June 1952) is a Mexican politician from the Party of the Democratic Revolution. From 2006 to 2009 she served as Deputy of the LX Legislature of the Mexican Congress representing Guanajuato.
