= Rocío Morgan Franco =

Mexican politician (born 1967)

- Born: 12 March 1967 (age 59); Monterrey, Nuevo León, Mexico
- Occupation: Politician
- Political party: PAN

Rocío del Carmen Morgan Franco (born 12 March 1967) is a Mexican politician from the National Action Party. She has served as Deputy of the LVII and LX Legislatures of the Mexican Congress representing Jalisco.
