= Heriberto Pérez Sánchez =

Mexican politician (born 1955)

- Born: 16 March 1955 (age 71); State of Mexico, Mexico
- Occupation: Politician
- Political party: PRD

Heriberto Pérez Sánchez (born 16 March 1955) is a Mexican politician from the Party of the Democratic Revolution. In 2009 he served as Deputy of the LX Legislature of the Mexican Congress representing the State of Mexico.
