= Anna Ramírez =

Anna Ramírez may refer to:

- Anna Ramírez (beach volleyball)
- Anna Ramírez (cyclist)

== See also ==
- Ana Ramírez (disambiguation)
