= Miguel Ángel Arellano Pulido =

Mexican politician

- Born: 11 May 1952 (age 74); Michoacán, Mexico
- Occupation: Politician
- Political party: PRD

Miguel Ángel Arellano Pulido (born 11 May 1952) is a Mexican politician from the Party of the Democratic Revolution. From 2006 to 2009 he served as Deputy of the LX Legislature of the Mexican Congress representing Michoacán.
