= Rubén Aguilar Jiménez =

Mexican politician

- Born: 10 March 1943 (age 83); Ojinaga, Chihuahua, Mexico
- Occupation: Politician
- Political party: PT

Rubén Aguilar Jiménez (born 10 March 1943) is a Mexican politician from the Labor Party. He has served as Deputy of the LII and LX Legislatures of the Mexican Congress representing Chihuahua (state).
