= Sergio Rojas Carmona =

Mexican politician

- Born: 24 January 1968 (age 58); State of Mexico, Mexico
- Occupation: Politician
- Political party: PRD

Sergio Rojas Carmona (born 24 January 1968) is a Mexican politician from the Party of the Democratic Revolution. From 2006 to 2009 he served as a Deputy of the LX Legislature of the Mexican Congress representing the State of Mexico.
