= Jesús Flores Morfín =

Mexican politician

- Born: 31 May 1953; Coahuila, Mexico
- Died: 17 January 2016 (aged 62); Distrito Federal, Mexico
- Occupation: Politician
- Political party: PAN

Jesús Vicente Flores Morfín (Note: In this Hispanic American name, the first or paternal surname is Flores and the second or maternal family name is Morfín.) (31 May 1953 – 17 January 2016) was a Mexican politician from the National Action Party (PAN).

In the 2006 general election, he was elected to a plurinominal seat in the Chamber of Deputies, where he served during the 60th Congress.

Three years earlier, in the 2003 mid-terms, he fought to represent Coahuila's 6th district in the Chamber; he was deemed to have won but, after the Institutional Revolutionary Party (PRI) lodged a challenge, the electoral court voided the result and a special election was held.

He died in Mexico City on 17 January 2016.
