= Aurora Cervantes Rodríguez =

Mexican politician

- Born: 8 January 1953 (age 73); Zacatecas, Mexico
- Education: Universidad Autónoma de La Laguna
- Occupation: Politician
- Political party: PRD

Aurora Cervantes Rodríguez (born 8 January 1953) is a Mexican politician from the Party of the Democratic Revolution. From 2006 to 2009 she served as Deputy of the LX Legislature of the Mexican Congress representing Zacatecas, and previously served in the Congress of Zacatecas.
