= Ariel Castillo Nájera =

Mexican politician

- Born: 2 December 1955 (age 70); Molango, Hidalgo, Mexico
- Occupations: Teacher and Politician
- Political party: PANAL

Ariel Castillo Nájera (born 2 December 1955) is a Mexican politician from the New Alliance Party. From 2006 to 2009 he served as Deputy of the LX Legislature of the Mexican Congress representing the State of Mexico.
