= Felipe Borrego Estrada =

Mexican politician

- Born: 11 November 1952 (age 74); Zacatecas, Zacatecas, Mexico
- Occupation: Politician
- Political party: PAN

Felipe Borrego Estrada (born 11 November 1952) is a Mexican politician from the National Action Party. From 2006 to 2009 he served as Deputy of the LX Legislature of the Mexican Congress representing Zacatecas.
