= María Esperanza Morelos Borja =

Mexican politician

- Born: 29 September 1953 (age 72); Michoacán, Mexico
- Occupation: Politician
- Political party: PAN

María Esperanza Morelos Borja (born 29 September 1953) is a Mexican politician from the National Action Party. She has served as Deputy of the LIII and LX Legislatures of the Mexican Congress representing Michoacán.
