= Carlos Ernesto Navarro López =

Mexican politician

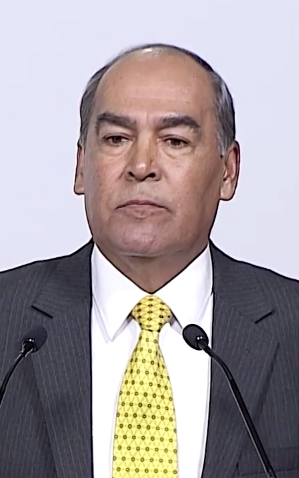
- Born: 20 May 1957 (age 69); Cajeme, Sonora, Mexico
- Education: Universidad de Sonora; Chapingo Autonomous University
- Occupation: Politician
- Political party: PRD

Carlos Ernesto Navarro López (born 20 May 1957) is a Mexican politician from the Party of the Democratic Revolution. From 2006 to 2009 he served as Deputy of the LX Legislature of the Mexican Congress representing Sonora.
