= Diana Pérez de Tejada =

Mexican politician

- Born: 15 July 1980 (age 45); Michoacán, Mexico
- Occupation: Politician
- Political party: PAN

Diana Pérez de Tejada (born 15 July 1980) is a Mexican politician from the National Action Party. From 2008 to 2009 she served as Deputy of the LX Legislature of the Mexican Congress representing Michoacán.
