= Ludivina Menchaca =

Mexican politician

- Born: 20 March 1963 (age 63); San Buenaventura, Coahuila, Mexico
- Education: Universidad Regiomontana
- Occupation: Senator
- Political party: PVEM

Nohemí Ludivina Menchaca Castellanos (born 20 March 1963) is a Mexican politician affiliated with the PVEM. As of 2013 she served as Senator of the LX and LXI Legislatures of the Mexican Congress representing Quintana Roo.
