= Roberto Mendoza Flores =

Mexican politician

- Born: 6 September 1953 (age 72); Tabasco, Mexico
- Occupation: Politician
- Political party: PRD

Roberto Mendoza Flores (born 6 September 1953) is a Mexican politician from the Party of the Democratic Revolution. From 2006 to 2009 he served as Deputy of the LX Legislature of the Mexican Congress representing Tabasco.
