= Pedro Landero López =

Mexican politician

- Born: 29 December 1963 (age 62); Tabasco, Mexico
- Occupation: Politician
- Political party: PRD

Pedro Landero López (born 29 December 1963) is a Mexican politician from the Party of the Democratic Revolution. From 2006 to 2009 he served as Deputy of the LX Legislature of the Mexican Congress representing Tabasco.
