= Sagrario Ortiz Montoro =

Mexican politician

Sagrario Ortíz Montoro
- Born: 5 November 1967 (age 58); Puebla, Mexico
- Occupation: Politician
- Political party: PAN

Sagrario María del Rosario Ortiz Montoro (born 5 November 1967) is a Mexican politician from the National Action Party. From 2008 to 2009 she served as Deputy of the LX Legislature of the Mexican Congress representing Puebla.
