= José Jácques y Medina =

Mexican politician

- Born: 26 September 1944 (age 81); Mexico City, Mexico
- Occupation: Politician
- Political party: PRD

José Jácques y Medina (born 26 September 1944) is a Mexican politician from the Party of the Democratic Revolution. From 2006 to 2009 he served as Deputy of the LX Legislature of the Mexican Congress representing the Federal District.
