= Guadalupe García Noriega =

Mexican politician

- Born: 2 December 1963 (age 62); Mexico City, Mexico
- Occupation: Politician
- Political party: PVEM

María Guadalupe García Noriega (born 2 December 1963) is a Mexican politician from the Ecologist Green Party of Mexico. From 2006 to 2009 she served as Deputy of the LX Legislature of the Mexican Congress representing Veracruz.
