= Delber Medina Rodríguez =

Mexican politician

- Born: 12 February 1960 (age 66); Tecuala, Nayarit, Mexico
- Occupation: Politician
- Political party: PAN

Delber Medina Rodríguez (born 12 February 1960) is a Mexican politician from the National Action Party. From 2006 to 2009 he served as Deputy of the LX Legislature of the Mexican Congress representing Nayarit.
