= Francisco Agundis Arias =

Mexican politician

- Born: 9 November 1969 (age 56); Mexico City, Mexico
- Occupations: Deputy and Senator
- Political party: PVEM

Francisco de Paula Agundis Arias (born 9 November 1969) is a Mexican politician affiliated with the PVEM. He served as Senator of the LX and LXI Legislatures of the Mexican Congress representing the Federal District. He also served as Deputy during the LVIII Legislature.
