= Patricia Castillo Romero =

Mexican politician

- Born: 6 March 1963 (age 63); Nayarit, Mexico
- Occupation: Politician
- Political party: MC

Patricia Obdulia de Jesús Castillo Romero (born 6 March 1963) is a Mexican politician from the Citizens' Movement. From 2006 to 2009 she served as Deputy of the LX Legislature of the Mexican Congress representing Nayarit.
