= Blanca Luna Becerril =

Mexican politician

- Born: 27 June 1968 (age 57); Mexico City, Mexico
- Occupation: Politician
- Political party: PANAL

Blanca Luna Becerril (born 27 June 1968) is a Mexican politician from the New Alliance Party. From 2006 to 2009 she served as Deputy of the LX Legislature of the Mexican Congress representing the Federal District.
