= María Dolores González Sánchez =

Mexican politician

- Born: 22 March 1963 (age 63); Zacatecas, Mexico
- Occupation: Politician
- Political party: PAN

María Dolores González Sánchez (born 22 March 1963) is a Mexican politician from the National Action Party. From 2006 to 2009 she served as Deputy of the LX Legislature of the Mexican Congress representing Zacatecas.
