= Moisés Gil Ramírez =

Mexican politician (born 1979)

- Born: 22 March 1979 (age 47); Mexico City, Mexico
- Occupation: Politician
- Political party: PRD

Moisés Gil Ramírez (born 22 March 1979) is a Mexican politician from the Party of the Democratic Revolution. In 2009 he served as Deputy of the LX Legislature of the Mexican Congress representing the Federal District.
