= Alejandro Velázquez Lara =

Mexican politician

- Born: 27 December 1974 (age 51); State of Mexico, Mexico
- Occupation: Politician
- Political party: PRD

Alejandro Velázquez Lara (born 27 December 1974) is a Mexican politician from the Party of the Democratic Revolution. In 2009, he served as Deputy of the LX Legislature of the Mexican Congress representing the State of Mexico.
