= Jesús Ricardo Morales Manzo =

Mexican politician

- Born: 17 February 1982 (age 44); Guerrero, Mexico
- Occupation: Politician
- Political party: PRD

Jesús Ricardo Morales Manzo (born 17 February 1982) is a Mexican politician from the Party of the Democratic Revolution. From 2008 to 2009 he served as Deputy of the LX Legislature of the Mexican Congress representing Guerrero.
