= Utrillo =

Utrillo is a surname. Notable people with the surname include:

- Maurice Utrillo (1883–1955), French painter of the School of Paris
- Miquel Utrillo (1862–1934), Catalan art critic, scenographer, painter and engineer

== See also ==
- Utrilla
