= Gloria Valenzuela García =

Mexican politician

- Born: 30 April 1956 (age 70); Sinaloa, Mexico
- Occupation: Politician
- Political party: PAN

María Gloria Guadalupe Valenzuela García (born 30 April 1956) is a Mexican politician from the National Action Party. From 2006 to 2009 she served as Deputy of the LX Legislature of the Mexican Congress representing Sinaloa.
