= Rosario Ortiz Magallón =

Mexican politician

- Born: 1 February 1951 (age 75); Mexico City, Mexico
- Occupation: Politician
- Political party: PRD

Rosario Ignacia Ortiz Magallón (born 1 February 1951) is a Mexican politician from the Party of the Democratic Revolution. From 2006 to 2009 she served as Deputy of the LX Legislature of the Mexican Congress representing Federal District.
