= Lariza Montiel Luis =

Mexican politician

- Born: 23 May 1976 (age 50); Saltillo, Coahuila, Mexico
- Occupation: Politician
- Political party: PAN

Lariza Montiel Luis (born 23 May 1976) is a Mexican politician from the National Action Party. From 2008 to 2009 she served as Deputy of the LX Legislature of the Mexican Congress representing Coahuila.
