= Celso Pulido Santiago =

Mexican politician

- Born: 7 December 1975 (age 50); Veracruz, Mexico
- Occupation: Politician
- Political party: PRD

Celso David Pulido Santiago (born 7 December 1975) is a Mexican politician from the Party of the Democratic Revolution. From 2006 to 2009 he served as Deputy of the LX Legislature of the Mexican Congress representing Veracruz.
