= Armando García Méndez =

Mexican politician

- Born: 28 December 1961 (age 64); State of Mexico, Mexico
- Occupation: Politician
- Political party: PASD

Armando García Méndez (born 28 December 1961) is a Mexican politician from the Social Democratic Party. From 2006 to 2009 he served as Deputy of the LX Legislature of the Mexican Congress representing the State of Mexico.
