= Ricardo Torres Origel =

Mexican politician

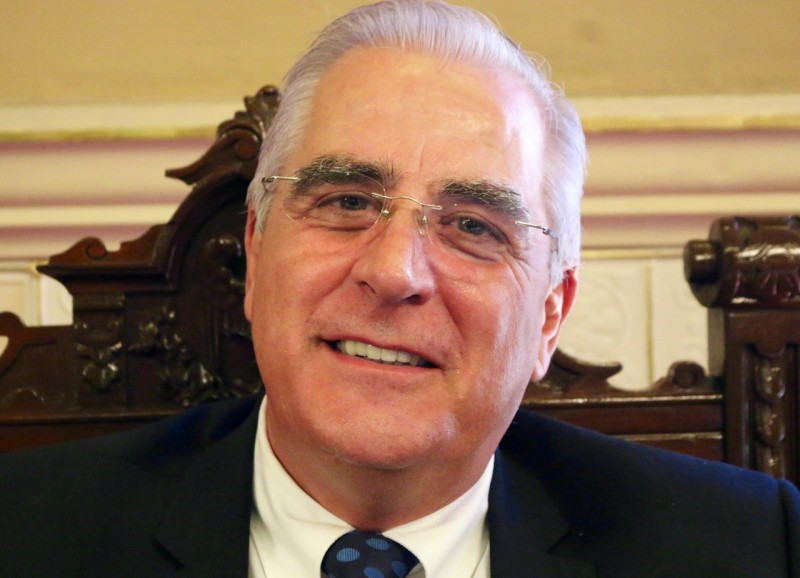
- 2019
- Born: Ricardo Torres Origel; 8 September 1956; León, Mexico
- Died: 24 April 2016 (aged 59); León, Mexico
- Occupations: politician, professor
- Political party: PAN

Ricardo Torres Origel (8 September 1956 – 24 April 2016) was a Mexican politician affiliated with the PAN. He served as a Senator of the LX and LXI Legislatures of the Mexican Congress representing Guanajuato. He also served as federal deputy during the LVIII Legislature, as well as a local deputy in the LVII Legislature of the Congress of Guanajuato.
