= María Elena Noriega Blanco =

Mexican politician

- Born: 21 December 1955 (age 70); Mexico City, Mexico
- Occupation: Politician
- Political party: PAN

María Elena de las Nieves Noriega Blanco Vigil (born 21 December 1955) is a Mexican politician from the National Action Party. From 2006 to 2009 she served as Deputy of the LX Legislature of the Mexican Congress representing the Federal District.
