= Lizbeth Medina Rodríguez =

Mexican politician

- Born: 25 October 1962 (age 63); Yucatán, Mexico
- Occupation: Politician
- Political party: PAN

Lizbeth Evelia Medina Rodríguez (born 25 October 1967) is a Mexican politician from the National Action Party. From 2006 to 2009 she served as Deputy of the LX Legislature of the Mexican Congress representing Yucatán.
