= Manuel Portilla Diéguez =

Mexican politician

- Born: 10 September 1969 (age 56); Mexico City, Mexico
- Occupation: Politician
- Political party: PVEM

Manuel Portilla Diéguez (born 10 September 1969) is a Mexican politician from the Ecologist Green Party of Mexico. From 2007 to 2009 he served as Deputy of the LX Legislature of the Mexican Congress representing the State of Mexico.
