= Miguel Ángel Jiménez Godínez =

Mexican politician

- Born: 10 June 1966 (age 59); Mexico City, Mexico
- Occupation: Politician
- Political party: PANAL

Miguel Ángel Jiménez Godínez (born 10 June 1966) is a Mexican politician from the New Alliance Party. From 2006 to 2009 he served as Deputy of the LX Legislature of the Mexican Congress representing the Federal District.
