= Elsa Conde Rodríguez =

Mexican politician

- Born: 20 February 1962 (age 64); State of Mexico, Mexico
- Occupation: Politician
- Political party: PASD

Elsa de Guadalupe Conde Rodríguez (born 20 February 1962) is a Mexican politician from the Social Democratic Party. From 2006 to 2009 she served as Deputy of the LX Legislature of the Mexican Congress representing the State of Mexico.
