= Mario Alberto Salazar Madera =

Mexican politician (born 1975)

- Born: 14 August 1975 (age 50); Guadalajara, Jalisco, Mexico
- Occupation: Politician
- Political party: PAN

Mario Alberto Salazar Madera (born 14 August 1975) is a Mexican politician from the National Action Party. From 2006 to 2009 he served as Deputy of the LX Legislature of the Mexican Congress representing Jalisco.
