= Silvia Luna Rodríguez =

Mexican politician

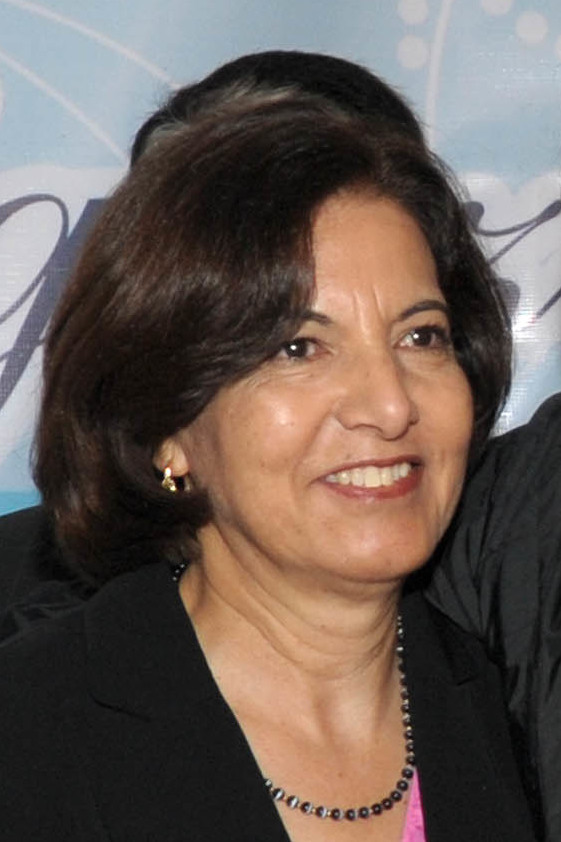
- Born: 3 November 1956 (age 69); Aguascalientes, Mexico
- Occupation: Politician
- Political party: PANAL

Silvia Luna Rodríguez (born 3 November 1956) is a Mexican politician from the New Alliance Party. She is a teacher educator. She has two master's degrees, one in Educational Sciences and Techniques and the other in Education with a specialization in Organization and Administration of Higher Education.

She is a teacher at a normal school. She holds two master's degrees, one in "Educational Sciences and Techniques" and the other in "Education" with a specialization in "Organization and Administration of Higher Education." She is a member of the National Union of Education Workers and was General Secretary of Section 1 of the SNTE (National Educational System of Teachers) in the state of Aguascalientes.

She is a member of the National Union of Education Workers; she was general secretary of the union section of the state of Aguascalientes. From 2006 to 2009 she served as Deputy of the LX Legislature of the Mexican Congress representing Aguascalientes.
