= Miguel Ángel Gutiérrez Aguilar =

Mexican politician

- Born: 21 July 1978 (age 47); Jalisco, Mexico
- Occupation: Politician
- Political party: PAN

Miguel Ángel Gutiérrez Aguilar (born 21 July 1978) is a Mexican politician from the National Action Party. From 2008 to 2009 he served as Deputy of the LX Legislature of the Mexican Congress representing Jalisco.
