= Ramón Valdés Chávez =

Mexican politician (born 1942)

- Born: 31 August 1942 (age 83); State of Mexico, Mexico
- Died: 2019 12 27
- Occupation: Politician
- Political party: MC

Ramón Valdés Chávez (born 31 August 1942) is a Mexican politician who is part of the Citizens' Movement. From 2006 to 2009 he served as Deputy of the LX Legislature of the Mexican Congress representing the State of Mexico.
