= Christian Martín Lujano Nicolás =

Mexican politician

- Born: 23 July 1977 (age 48); Mexico City, Mexico
- Occupation: Politician
- Political party: PAN

Christian Martín Lujano Nicolás (born 23 July 1977) is a Mexican politician from the National Action Party. From 2006 to 2009 he served as Deputy of the LX Legislature of the Mexican Congress representing the Federal District.
