= María Fernández Ugarte =

Mexican politician

- Born: 18 May 1953 (age 73); Coahuila, Mexico
- Occupation: Politician
- Political party: PAN

María del Carmen Fernández Ugarte (born 18 May 1953) is a Mexican politician from the National Action Party. From 2007 to 2009 she served as Deputy of the LX Legislature of the Mexican Congress representing Coahuila.
