= Holly Matus Toledo =

Mexican politician

- Born: 6 February 1964 (age 62); Chiapas, Mexico
- Occupation: Politician
- Political party: PRD

Holly Matus Toledo (born 6 February 1964) is a Mexican politician from the Party of the Democratic Revolution. From 2006 to 2009 she served as Deputy of the LX Legislature of the Mexican Congress representing Chiapas.
