= Neftalí Garzón Contreras =

Mexican politician

- Born: 21 October 1948 (age 77); Puebla, Mexico
- Occupation: Politician
- Political party: PRD

Neftalí Garzón Contreras (born 21 October 1948) is a Mexican politician from the Party of the Democratic Revolution. From 2006 to 2009 he served as Deputy of the LX Legislature of the Mexican Congress representing Puebla.
