= Ricardo Rodríguez Jiménez =

Mexican politician

- Born: 16 January 1975 (age 51); Jalisco, Mexico
- Occupation: Politician
- Political party: PAN (1992–2014)

Ricardo Rodríguez Jiménez (born 16 January 1975) is a Mexican politician formerly from the National Action Party. From 2006 to 2009 he served as Deputy of the LX Legislature of the Mexican Congress representing Jalisco.
