= Josefina López Espinosa =

Mexican politician

- Born: 19 March 1958 (age 68); State of Mexico, Mexico
- Occupation: Politician
- Political party: PAN

Patricia Josefina López Espinosa (born 19 March 1958) is a Mexican politician from the National Action Party. In 2009 she served as Deputy of the LX Legislature of the Mexican Congress representing the State of Mexico.
