= José González Morfín =

Mexican politician and lawyer

President of the Chamber of Deputies
- In office 6 March 2014 – 31 August 2014
- Preceded by: Ricardo Anaya Cortés
- Succeeded by: Silvano Aureoles Conejo

President of the Senate of Mexico
- In office 1 September 2011 – 31 August 2012
- Preceded by: Manlio Fabio Beltrones
- Succeeded by: Ernesto Cordero Arroyo

Personal details
- Born: 25 July 1954 (age 71) Cotija de la Paz, Michoacán, Mexico
- Party: PAN
- Occupation: Deputy and lawyer

José González Morfín (Note: In this Hispanic American name, the first or paternal surname is González and the second or maternal family name is Morfín.) (born 25 July 1954) is a Mexican politician and lawyer affiliated with the National Action Party (PAN). He served as a plurinominal deputy during the 62nd Congress (2012–2015). He also served as a national-list senator during the 60th and 61st Congresses (2006–2012).

Also:

- 2003–2006: Federal deputy during the 59th Congress
- 1992–1995: Local deputy, Congress of Michoacán
- 1988–1991: Federal deputy during the 54th Congress
