= Elías Cárdenas Márquez =

Mexican politician

- Born: 2 September 1936 (age 89); Mexico
- Education: UAdeC
- Occupation: Politician
- Political party: MC

Elías Cárdenas Márquez (born 2 September 1936) is a Mexican politician from the Citizens' Movement. From 2006 to 2009 he served as Deputy of the LX Legislature of the Mexican Congress representing the State of Mexico, and he previously served in the XLVIII Legislature of the Congress of Coahuila.
