= Efraín Arizmendi Uribe =

Mexican politician

- Born: 18 December 1961 (age 64); Buenavista de Cuéllar, Guerrero, Mexico
- Occupation: Politician
- Political party: PAN

Efraín Arizmendi Uribe (born 18 December 1961) is a Mexican politician from the National Action Party. From 2006 to 2009 he served as Deputy of the LX Legislature of the Mexican Congress representing Guerrero.
