= Marisol Mora Cuevas =

Mexican politician (1970–2012)

- Born: 27 May 1970; Veracruz, Mexico
- Died: 25 June 2012 (aged 42); Veracruz, Mexico
- Occupation: Politician
- Political party: PAN

Marisol Mora Cuevas (27 May 1970 – c. 24 June 2012) was a mayor of Tlacojalpan, in the Mexican state of Veracruz, who served until her assassination. She was a member of the National Action Party. From 2006 to 2009 she served as Deputy of the LX Legislature of the Mexican Congress representing Veracruz. On 24 June 2012 she was abducted at the exit of a party's event and was found dead on 28 June with signs of suffocation.
