= Alfonso Izquierdo Bustamante =

Mexican politician

- Born: 14 October 1953; Mexico City, Mexico
- Died: 8 December 2011 (aged 58); Tabasco, Mexico
- Occupation: Politician
- Political party: PRI

Alfonso Rolando Izquierdo Bustamante (14 October 1953 – 8 December 2011) was a Mexican politician from the Institutional Revolutionary Party. From 2006 to 2009 he served as Deputy of the LX Legislature of the Mexican Congress representing Tabasco.
