= Rosa Elena Galván Valles =

Mexican politician

- Born: 1 July 1949 (age 76); Durango, Mexico
- Occupation: Politician
- Political party: PAN

Rosa Elena Galván Valles (born 1 July 1949) is a Mexican politician from the National Action Party. In 2009 she served as Deputy of the LX Legislature of the Mexican Congress representing Durango.
