= Efraín Peña Damacio =

Mexican politician

- Born: 10 July 1964 (age 61); Guerrero, Mexico
- Occupation: Politician
- Political party: PRD

Efraín Peña Damacio (born 10 July 1964) is a Mexican politician from the Party of the Democratic Revolution. From 2008 to 2009 he served as Deputy of the LX Legislature of the Mexican Congress representing Guerrero.
