= Sérgio Lopes =

Sérgio Lopes may refer to:

- Sérgio Lopes (footballer) (1941–2024), Brazilian footballer and football manager
- Sérgio Lopes (musician) (born 1965), Brazilian singer, poet and composer
- Sérgio Lopes (handballer) (born 1983), Angolan handball player

== See also ==
- Sergio López (disambiguation)
- Sergi López (disambiguation)
