= Luz María Beristain =

Mexican politician

- Born: 4 October 1963 (age 62); Tizimín, Yucatán, Mexico
- Political party: PRD

Luz María Beristain Navarrete (Note: In this Mexican name, the surname is Beristain and the second or maternal family name is Navarrete.) (born 4 October 1963) is a Mexican politician affiliated with the Party of the Democratic Revolution (PRD). She was a senator during the 62nd Congress representing Quintana Roo.
