= Marco Orozco Ruiz Velasco =

Mexican politician

Marco Orozco Ruiz Velazco
- Born: 16 February 1959 (age 67); Nuevo León, Mexico
- Died: 22/Diciembre/2017
- Occupation: Politician
- Political party: PAN

Marco Heriberto Orozco Ruiz Velasco (born 16 Febrero 1959) is a Mexican politician from the National Action Party. From 2006 to 2009 he served as Deputy of the LX Legislature of the Mexican Congress representing Nuevo León.

Primer City Manager del municipio de San Pedro Garza García en Nuevo León.
