= Yolanda Rodríguez Ramírez =

Mexican politician (born 1962)

- Born: 3 September 1962 (age 63); Autlán de Navarro, Jalisco, Mexico
- Occupation: Politician
- Political party: PRI

Bertha Yolanda Rodríguez Ramírez (born 3 September 1962) is a Mexican politician from the Institutional Revolutionary Party. From 2006 to 2009 she served as Deputy of the LX Legislature of the Mexican Congress representing Jalisco.
