= Leticia Díaz de León Torres =

Mexican politician

- Born: 22 October 1969 (age 56)
- Education: UASLP
- Occupation: Politician
- Political party: PAN

Leticia Díaz de León Torres (born 22 October 1969) is a Mexican politician from the National Action Party. From 2006 to 2009 she served as Deputy of the LX Legislature of the Mexican Congress representing San Luis Potosí, and previously served in the Congress of San Luis Potosí from 1997 to 2000.
