= Mario Franco Valencia =

Mexican politician

- Born: 20 January 1969 (age 57); State of Mexico, Mexico
- Occupation: Politician
- Political party: PAN

Mario Franco Valencia (born 20 January 1969) is a Mexican politician from the National Action Party. In 2009 he served as Deputy of the LX Legislature of the Mexican Congress representing the State of Mexico.
