= Geraldine Ramírez Zollino =

Mexican politician

- Born: 16 September 1981 (age 44); Mexico City, Mexico
- Occupation: Politician
- Political party: PVEM

Andrea Geraldine Ramírez Zollino (born 16 September 1981) is a Mexican politician from the Ecologist Green Party of Mexico. In 2009 he served as Deputy of the LX Legislature of the Mexican Congress representing the Federal District.
