= Jesús Humberto Zazueta Aguilar =

Mexican politician

- Born: 22 February 1956 (age 70); Costa Rica, Sinaloa, Mexico
- Occupation: Politician
- Political party: PRD

Jesús Humberto Zazueta Aguilar (born 22 February 1956) is a Mexican politician from the Party of the Democratic Revolution. He has served as Deputy of the LV and LX Legislatures of the Mexican Congress representing Guerrero.
