= Mauricio Ortiz Proal =

Mexican politician

- Born: 14 October 1973 (age 52); Aguascalientes, Aguascalientes, Mexico
- Occupation: Politician
- Political party: PRI

Mauricio Ortiz Proal (born 14 October 1973) is a Mexican politician from the Institutional Revolutionary Party. From 2006 to 2009 he served as Deputy of the LX Legislature of the Mexican Congress representing Querétaro.
