= Gabriela Ortiz Martínez =

Mexican politician

- Born: 15 November 1973 (age 52); State of Mexico, Mexico
- Occupation: Politician
- Political party: PAN

Gabriela Ortiz Martínez de Kores (born 15 November 1973) is a Mexican politician from the National Action Party. In 2009 she served as Deputy of the LX Legislature of the Mexican Congress representing the State of Mexico.
