= Gerardo Aranda Orozco =

Mexican politician (born 1952)

- Born: 21 April 1952 (age 74); Sonora, Mexico
- Occupation: Politician
- Political party: PAN

Gerardo Aranda Orozco (born 21 April 1952) is a Mexican politician from the National Action Party. From 2006 to 2009, he served as Deputy of the LX Legislature of the Mexican Congress representing Sonora.
