= Raúl Alejandro Padilla Orozco =

Mexican politician (born 1960)

- Born: 24 April 1960 (age 66); Jalisco, Mexico
- Occupation: Politician
- Political party: PAN

Raúl Alejandro Padilla Orozco (born 24 April 1960) is a Mexican politician from the National Action Party. From 2006 to 2009, he served as Deputy of the LX Legislature of the Mexican Congress representing Jalisco.
