= María Mercedes Corral Aguilar =

Mexican politician

- Born: 24 September 1947 (age 78); Sonora, Mexico
- Education: Universidad de Sonora
- Occupation: Politician
- Political party: PAN

María Mercedes Corral Aguilar (born 24 September 1947) is a Mexican politician from the National Action Party. From 2006 to 2009 she served as Deputy of the LX Legislature of the Mexican Congress representing Sonora, and previously served in the LVII Legislatur of the Congress of Sonora.
