= Gustavo Parra Noriega =

Mexican lawyer and politician

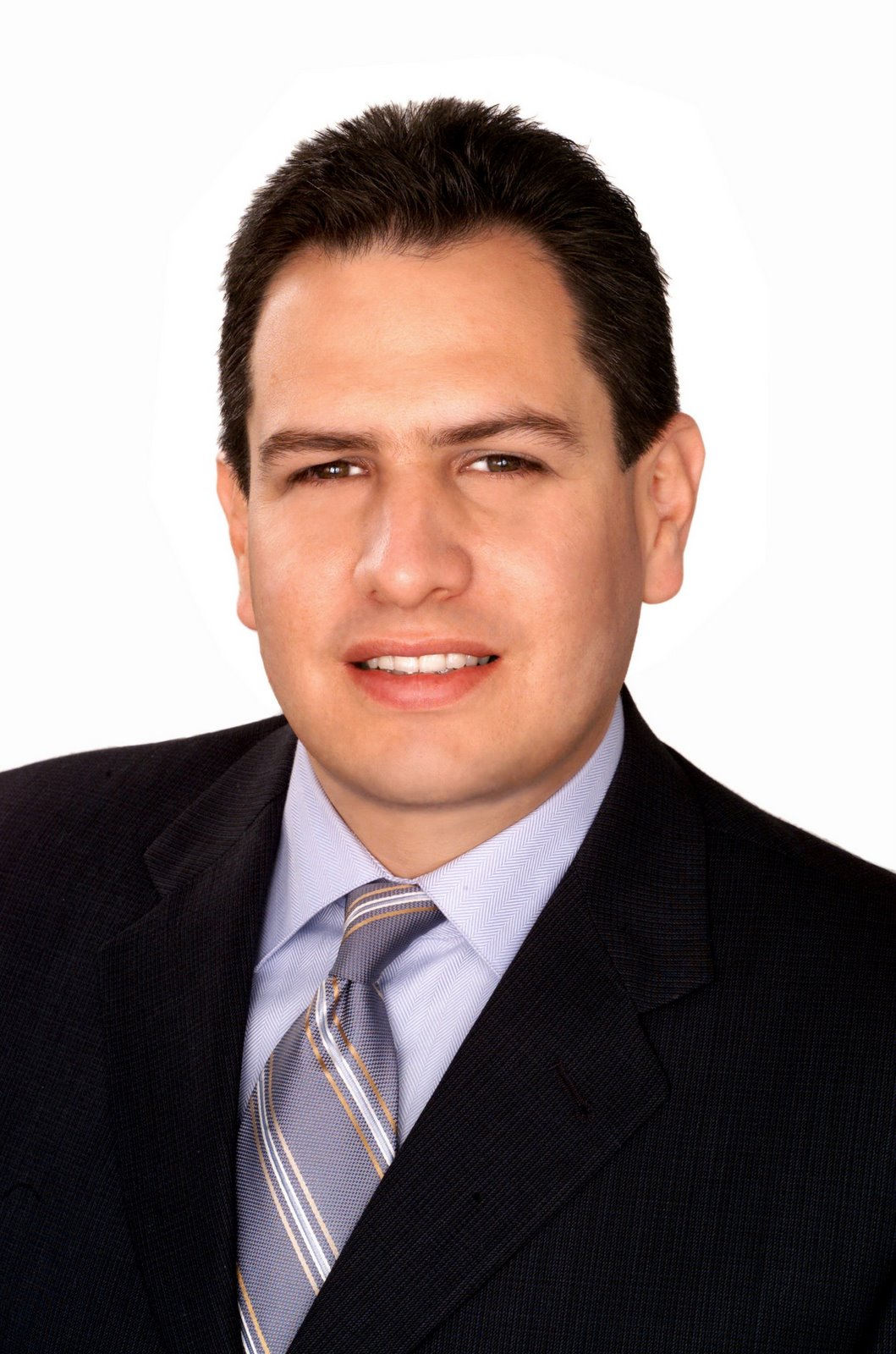
- Born: 4 February 1973 (age 53); Naucalpan, State of Mexico, Mexico
- Occupations: Lawyer and politician
- Political party: PAN

Luis Gustavo Parra Noriega (born 4 February 1973) is a Mexican lawyer and politician from the National Action Party. From 2006 to 2009 he served as Deputy of the LX Legislature of the Mexican Congress representing the State of Mexico.
