= Miguel Ángel Macedo Escartín =

Mexican politician

- Born: 22 December 1955 (age 70); Mexico City, Mexico
- Occupation: Politician
- Political party: PRD

Miguel Ángel Macedo Escartín (born 22 December 1955) is a Mexican politician from the Party of the Democratic Revolution. In 2009 he served as deputy of the LX Legislature of the Mexican Congress representing the Federal District.
