= Pablo Leopoldo Arreola Ortega =

Mexican politician

- Born: 15 November 1958 (age 67); Mexico City, Mexico
- Occupation: Politician
- Political party: PT

Pablo Leopoldo Arreola Ortega (born 15 November 1958) is a Mexican politician from the Labor Party. From 2006 to 2009 he served as Deputy of the LX Legislature of the Mexican Congress representing the Federal District.
