= Pilar Guerrero Rubio =

Mexican politician

- Born: 2 May 1984 (age 42); State of Mexico, Mexico
- Occupation: Politician
- Political party: PVEM

Pilar Guerrero Rubio (born 2 May 1984) is a Mexican politician from the Ecologist Green Party of Mexico. She served as a Deputy in the LX Legislature of the Mexican Congress from 2006 to 2009, representing the State of Mexico.
