= Edu Sánchez =

Spanish footballer (born 2005)

Personal information
- Full name: Eduardo Sánchez Lamadrid
- Date of birth: 21 June 2005 (age 21)
- Place of birth: Navalmoral de la Mata, Spain
- Height: 1.80 m (5 ft 11 in)
- Position: Left-back

Team information
- Current team: Antequera
- Number: 14

Youth career
- 2020–2021: Diocesano
- 2021–2022: Badajoz

Senior career*
Years	Team	Apps	(Gls)
2022–2023	Badajoz	20	(0)
2023–2025	Barcelona B	7	(0)
2025	Mérida	4	(0)
2025–	Antequera	25	(0)

International career^{‡}
2023	Spain U18	2	(0)
- * Club domestic league appearances and goals as of 10 June 2026 ‡ National team caps and goals as of 20 April 2023

Eduardo Sánchez Lamadrid (born 21 June 2005) is a Spanish footballer who plays as a left-back for Primera Federación club Antequera.

== Early life ==
Sánchez is a native of Navalmoral de la Mata, Spain.

== Career ==
Sánchez has represented Spain internationally at youth level.

On 22 January 2025 he joined Mérida on loan.

== Style of play ==
Sánchez mainly operates as a defender and has been described as "clean, with offensive projection, somewhat in need of defensive forcefulness but with attitude".

== Personal life ==
Sánchez is of Cuban descent.

== Career statistics ==
=== Club ===
As of matches played 15 September 2024

Appearances and goals by club, season and competition
Club	Season	League			Cup		Europe		Other		Total	
Club	Season	Division	Apps	Goals	Apps	Goals	Apps	Goals	Apps	Goals	Apps	Goals
Badajoz	2022–23	Primera Federación	20	0	0	0	–		0	0	20	0
Barcelona B	2023–24	Primera Federación	1	0	–		–		0	0	1	0
Barcelona B	2024–25	Primera Federación	4	0	–		–		0	0	4	0
Barcelona B	Total		5	0	0	0	0	0	0	0	5	0
Career total			25	0	0	0	0	0	0	0	25	0
