= Roberto Badillo Martínez =

Mexican military general and politician (born 1938)

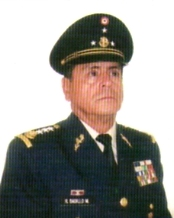
- Born: 7 June 1938 (age 87); Papantla, Veracruz, Mexico
- Education: Heroico Colegio Militar, Escuela Superior de Guerra
- Occupations: General (Mexican Army) and politician
- Political party: PRI

Roberto Badillo Martínez (born 7 June 1938) is a Mexican retired military general and politician from the Institutional Revolutionary Party. From 2006 to 2009 he served as Deputy of the LX Legislature of the Mexican Congress representing Veracruz.
