= Ana Mercedes Pérez =

Venezuelan diplomat, politician (1910–1994)

Ana Mercedes Pérez (1910, Puerto Cabello – 1994; pseudonym "Claribel") was a Venezuelan poet, writer, translator, journalist and diplomat.

== Biography ==
She was the daughter of the Laran jurist and diplomat, José Eugenio Pérez, who served as the Venezuelan consul general in London, and as President of the House of Deputies.

Her poetry was characterized as being very feminine, punctuated with notes of rebellion and angst. Along with her journalist contemporaries such as Juana de Ávila, Teresa Troconis, Peregrino Pérez, Isabel Jimenez Arráiz de Díaz, Pérez was a defender of Ligia Parra Jahn in the Caracas newspaper.

== Selected works ==
- El charco azul (1931)
- Iluminada soledad (1949)
- La verdad inedita (1947)
- Yo acuso a un muerto, defense of Ligia Parra Jahn (Caracas, 1951)
