= Sergio Augusto López Ramírez =

Mexican politician

- Born: 16 January 1961 (age 65); Aguascalientes, Aguascalientes, Mexico
- Occupation: Politician
- Political party: PVEM

Sergio Augusto López Ramírez (born 16 January 1961) is a Mexican politician from the Ecologist Green Party of Mexico. From 2006 to 2009 he served as Deputy of the LX Legislature of the Mexican Congress representing Aguascalientes.
