= Daniel Pérez Valdés =

Mexican politician

- Born: 11 July 1963 (age 62); Veracruz, Mexico
- Occupation: Politician
- Political party: PRI

Daniel Pérez Valdés (born 11 July 1963) is a Mexican politician from the Institutional Revolutionary Party. From 2006 to 2009 he served as Deputy of the LX Legislature of the Mexican Congress representing Veracruz.
