= Erick López Barriga =

Mexican politician

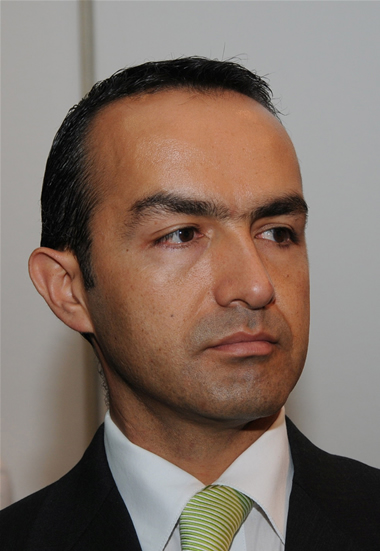
- Born: 14 May 1971 (age 55); Morelia, Michoacán, Mexico
- Education: UMSNH, UT Austin, UC Berkeley, Universidad de Guanajuato
- Occupation: Politician
- Political party: PRD

Erick López Barriga (born 14 May 1971) is a Mexican politician from the Party of the Democratic Revolution. From 2006 to 2009, he served as Deputy of the LX Legislature of the Mexican Congress representing Michoacán.
