= Jesús Ramírez Stabros =

Mexican politician

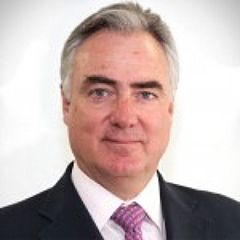
- Born: 22 April 1963 (age 63); San Luis Potosí, Mexico
- Education: National Autonomous University of Mexico
- Occupation: Politician
- Political party: PRI

Jesús Ramírez Stabros (born 22 April 1963) is a Mexican politician from the Institutional Revolutionary Party. He has served as deputy of the LVIII and LX Legislatures of the Mexican Congress representing San Luis Potosí.
