= Leonardo Magallón Arceo =

Mexican politician (born 1954)

- Born: 5 September 1954 (age 71); Guanajuato, Mexico
- Occupation: Politician
- Political party: PAN

Leonardo Melesio de Jesús Magallón Arceo (born 5 September 1954) is a Mexican politician from the National Action Party. From 2006 to 2009 he served as Deputy of the LX Legislature of the Mexican Congress representing Guanajuato.
