= Lucía Beristaín =

Mexican politician

- Born: 28 December 1968 (age 57); State of Mexico, Mexico
- Occupation: Politician
- Political party: PAN

Lucía Beristaín Enríquez (born 28 December 1968) is a Mexican politician from the National Action Party. In 2009, she served as Deputy of the LX Legislature of the Mexican Congress representing the State of Mexico.
