= Ana Elisa Pérez Bolaños =

Mexican politician

- Born: 13 June 1973 (age 52); Mexico City, Mexico
- Occupation: Politician
- Political party: PANAL

Ana Elisa Pérez Bolaños (born 13 June 1973) is a Mexican politician from the New Alliance Party. In 2009 he served as Deputy of the LX Legislature of the Mexican Congress representing the Federal District.
