= Víctorino Beristain =

Mexican water polo player (born 1956)

Personal information
- Nationality: Mexican
- Born: 3 December 1956 (age 68)

Sport
- Sport: Water polo

Víctorino Beristain (born 3 December 1956) is a Mexican water polo player. He competed in the men's tournament at the 1976 Summer Olympics.
