= Ana Millán Gasca =

Spanish historian of science

Ana María Millán Gasca (born 1964) is a Spanish historian of science, scholar of mathematics education, and book author. She works in Italy as a professor at Roma Tre University.

== Education and career ==
Millán was born in 1964 in Zaragosa, and has a 1990 PhD in mathematical sciences from the University of Zaragoza. She joined Roma Tre in 2006, after previously teaching at the University of Zaragoza, the University of La Rioja, the University of L'Aquila, and the University of Rome Tor Vergata.

At Roma Tre, she is a full professor in the department of science education, where her laboratory focuses on primary-school mathematics education, especially for students with learning disabilities.

== Books ==
Millán's books include:

- The Biology of Numbers: The Correspondence of Vito Volterra on Mathematical Biology (with Giorgio Israel, Birkhäuser, 2002)
- Technological Concepts and Mathematical Models in the Evolution of Modern Engineering Systems: Controlling, Managing, Organizing (edited with Mario Lucertini and Fernando Nicolòm, Birkhäuser, 2004)
- Euclides: La fuerza del razonamiento matemático (Nivola, 2004)
- All'inizio fu lo scriba: Piccola storia della matematica come strumento di conoscenza (Mimesis, 2004)
- Fabbriche, sistemi, organizzazioni: Storia dell’ingegneria industriale (Springer, 2006)
- The World as a Mathematical Game: John von Neumann and Twentieth Century Science (with Giorgio Israel, Birkhäuser, 2009)
- Pensare in matematica (with Giorgio Israel, Zanichelli, 2012)
- Numeri e forme: Didattica della matematica con i bambini (Zanichelli, 2016)
- I bambini e il pensiero scientifico (with Paola Magrone, Carocci, 2018)
- L'abc della matematica (Carocci, 2021)

== Recognition ==
Millán has been a corresponding member of the International Academy of the History of Science since 2012.
