= Eduardo Nava Bolaños =

Mexican politician

- Born: 21 December 1952; Contepec, Michoacán, Mexico
- Died: 12 March 2021 (aged 68)
- Occupation: Politician
- Political party: PAN

Eduardo Tomás Nava Bolaños (21 December 1952 – 12 March 2021) was a Mexican politician affiliated with the National Action Party (PAN). In 2006–2012 he served as a senator in the 60th and 61st sessions of Congress, representing the state of Querétaro.
