= Alain Ferrat =

Mexican politician

- Born: 13 November 1973 (age 52); Veracruz, Mexico
- Occupation: Politician
- Political party: PVEM

Alain Ferrat Mancera (born 13 November 1973) is a Mexican politician from the Ecologist Green Party of Mexico. From 2008 to 2009 he served as Deputo of the LX Legislature of the Mexican Congress representing Veracruz.
