= Eduardo Sánchez Hernández =

Mexican politician

- Born: 13 June 1964 (age 62); Mexico City, Mexico
- Education: Universidad Iberoamericana
- Occupation: Politician
- Political party: PRI

Eduardo Sánchez Hernández (born 13 June 1964) is a Mexican politician from the Institutional Revolutionary Party. From 2006 to 2009 he served as Deputy of the LX Legislature of the Mexican Congress representing the Federal District.
