= Soledad Limas Frescas =

Mexican politician

- Born: 31 March 1961 (age 65); Chihuahua, Mexico
- Occupation: Politician
- Political party: PAN

María Soledad Limas Frescas (born 31 March 1963) is a Mexican politician from the National Action Party. From 2006 to 2009 she served as Deputy of the LX Legislature of the Mexican Congress representing Chihuahua.
