= Olivia Utrilla Nieto =

Mexican politician

- Born: 6 June 1969 (age 56); Morelos, Mexico
- Occupation: Politician
- Political party: PAN

Olivia Verónica Utrilla Nieto (born 6 June 1969) is a Mexican politician from the National Action Party. In 2009 she served as Deputy of the LX Legislature of the Mexican Congress representing Morelos.
