= Angelina Sánchez Valdez =

Mexican politician

Eva Angelina Sánchez Valdez
- Born: 4 August 1978 (age 47); Mexico City, Mexico
- Occupation: Politician
- Political party: PRD

Eva Angelina Sánchez Valdez (born 4 August 1978) is a Mexican politician from the Party of the Democratic Revolution. From 2008 to 2009 she served as Deputy of the LX Legislature of the Mexican Congress representing the Federal District.
