= Salvador Sánchez Peñuelas =

Mexican politician (born 1951)

- Born: 23 October 1951 (age 74); Sonora, Mexico
- Occupation: Politician
- Political party: PRI

Salvador Sánchez Peñuelas (born 23 October 1951) is a Mexican politician from the Institutional Revolutionary Party. In 2009, he served as Deputy of the LX Legislature of the Mexican Congress representing Sonora.
