= Javier González Garza =

Mexican mathematician and politician

- Born: 12 July 1945 (age 81); Monterrey, Nuevo León, Mexico
- Education: Autonomous University of Nuevo León
- Occupations: Mathematician and politician
- Political party: PRD

Javier González Garza (born 12 July 1945) is a Mexican mathematician and politician affiliated with the Party of the Democratic Revolution. In 2006–2009 he served as a deputy in the 60th Congress, representing the Federal District's second district.
