= Ana Pérez-Neira =

Spanish telecommunications engineer

Ana Isabel Pérez-Neira (born 1967) is a Spanish telecommunications engineer, a professor in the Signal Theory and Communication Department of the Polytechnic University of Catalonia, the former vice rector for research of the university, the director of the Centre Tecnológic de Telecomunicacions de Catalunya, and the coordinator of the European Space Agency Networks of Excellence on Satellite Communications. Her research concerns multibeam satellite communications, beamforming, and the signal processing needed in that application.

== Education and career ==
Pérez-Neira was born in 1967 in Zaragoza. She studied electrical engineering, earning a bachelor's degree in 1989, and then a master's degree in 1991 at University Ramon Llull. She completed a Ph.D. in 1995 at the Polytechnic University of Catalonia, working there with Miguel Àngel Lagunas Hernández.

She was appointed as a full professor at the Polytechnic University of Catalonia in 2006, and served as vice rector for research from 2010 to 2014. She was appointed as director of the Centre Tecnológic de Telecomunicacions de Catalunya in 2021.

== Recognition ==
Pérez-Neira was named an IEEE Fellow, in the 2020 class of fellows, "for contributions to signal processing for satellite communications and systems". She became a full member of the Royal Academy of Sciences and Arts of Barcelona in 2021. In 2022 she was named a EURASIP Fellow by the European Association for Signal Processing, "for her contributions to signal processing for satellite and wireless communication systems".
