= Margarita Martínez Bernal =

Mexican politician

- Born: 18 January 1964 (age 62); State of Mexico, Mexico
- Occupation: Politician
- Political party: PAN

Blanca Margarita Martínez Bernal (born 18 January 1964) is a Mexican politician from the National Action Party. In 2009 she served as Deputy of the LX Legislature of the Mexican Congress representing the State of Mexico.
