= Gloria María Perroni =

Mexican politician

- Born: 4 July 1943 (age 82); Puebla, Mexico
- Occupation: Politician
- Political party: PAN

Gloria María Perroni Merino (born 4 July 1943) is a Mexican politician from the National Action Party. From 2007 to 2009 she served as Deputy of the LX Legislature of the Mexican Congress representing Puebla.
