= Teresa Alcocer y Gasca =

Mexican politician

- Born: 25 October 1952 (age 73); Valladolid, Yucatán, Mexico
- Occupation: Politician
- Political party: PAN

Teresa de Jesús Alcocer y Gasca (born 25 October 1952) is a Mexican politician from the National Action Party. In 2009 she served as Deputy of the LX Legislature of the Mexican Congress representing Yucatán.
