= Alberto Vázquez Martínez =

Mexican politician

- Born: 9 March 1967 (age 59); Querétaro, Mexico
- Education: UAQ
- Occupation: Politician
- Political party: PAN

Alberto Vázquez Martínez (born 9 March 1967) is a Mexican politician from the National Action Party. From 2006 to 2009 he served as Deputy of the LX Legislature of the Mexican Congress representing Querétaro.
