= David Figueroa Ortega =

Mexican politician

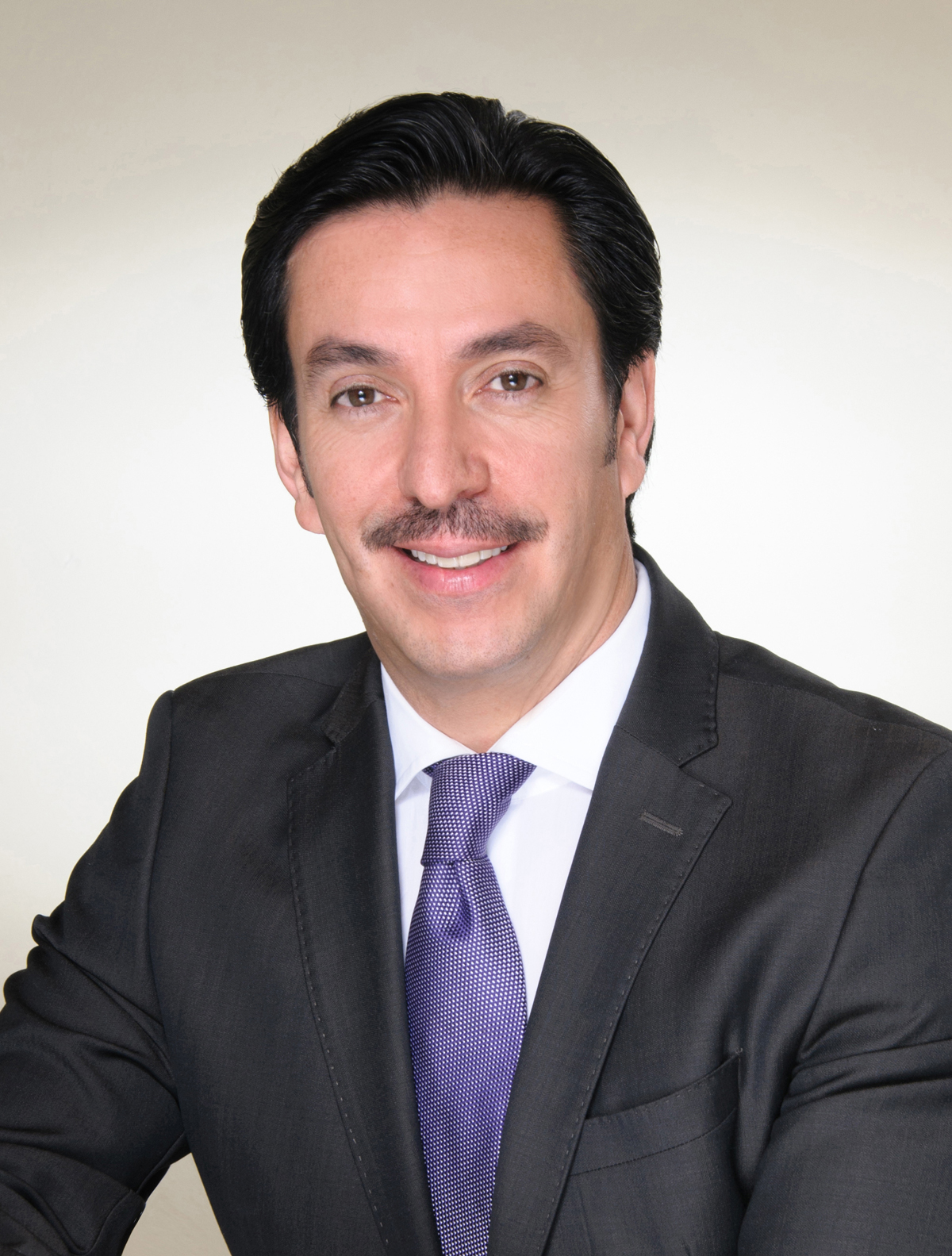

Deputy of the Congress of Sonora from District VI
- Incumbent
- Assumed office 2024

Consul of Mexico in Los Angeles
- In office 2011–2013

Consul of Mexico in San Jose
- In office 2008–2010

Member of the Chamber of Deputies from the First Electoral Region
- In office 28 June 2006 – 1 September 2009

Personal details
- Born: 6 July 1970 (age 55) Aribabi, Huachinera Municipality, Sonora, Mexico
- Occupation: Diplomat and politician

David Figueroa Ortega (born 6 July 1970) is a Mexican diplomat and politician from the National Action Party. From 2006 to 2009 he served as Deputy of the LX Legislature of the Mexican Congress representing Sonora, and previously served as municipal president of Agua Prieta.

He also has been Consul of Mexico in San Jose, California from 2008 to 2010 and Consul of Mexico in Los Angeles from 2011 to 2013.
