= Quebrada Limas =

Location
- Country: Colombia

Physical characteristics
- Source
  - location: El Nacedero Chapemonte (Vereda de Quiba)
  - elevation: 3,250 m (10,660 ft)
- Mouth: Tunjuelo River
  - location: Bogotá
  - coordinates: 4°34′26″N 74°08′52″W
  - elevation: 2,640 m (8,660 ft)
- Length: 10.5 km (6.5 mi)

Quebrada Limas is a small river of Bogotá that originates in the path of Quiba, in the rural part of the Ciudad Bolívar and therefore, it is a tributary of the Tunjuelo River.

== General characteristics ==
Quebrada Limas extends southwest-northeast through a rural part and the entire urban part of Ciudad Bolivar, since in this area receives all the pollution load from garbage and the landfills of the neighborhoods of Bella Flor, Juan José Rondón, Villa Gloria, El Triunfo, Marandú, Juan Pablo II, Brisas del Volador, Sauces, San José de los Sauces, San Francisco, Villa del Diamante and Candelaria la Nueva, the latter prone to floods caused by rains. At the moment this river is under observation to achieve a total rehabilitation of its basin and to prevent major environmental problems, subject that is under pact between the Mayor's Office of Bogota and the Quebrada Limas Committee in November of 2004.
