= Justiniano González Betancourt =

Mexican politician (born 1936)

Jorge Justiniano González Betancourt
- Born: 4 October 1936 (age 89); Chiapas, Mexico
- Occupations: Retired general and politician
- Political party: PAN

Jorge Justiniano González Betancourt (born 4 October 1936) is a Mexican retired general politician from the National Action Party. From 2006 to 2009 he served as Deputy of the LX Legislature of the Mexican Congress representing Chiapas.
