= Obdulio Ávila Mayo =

Mexican politician

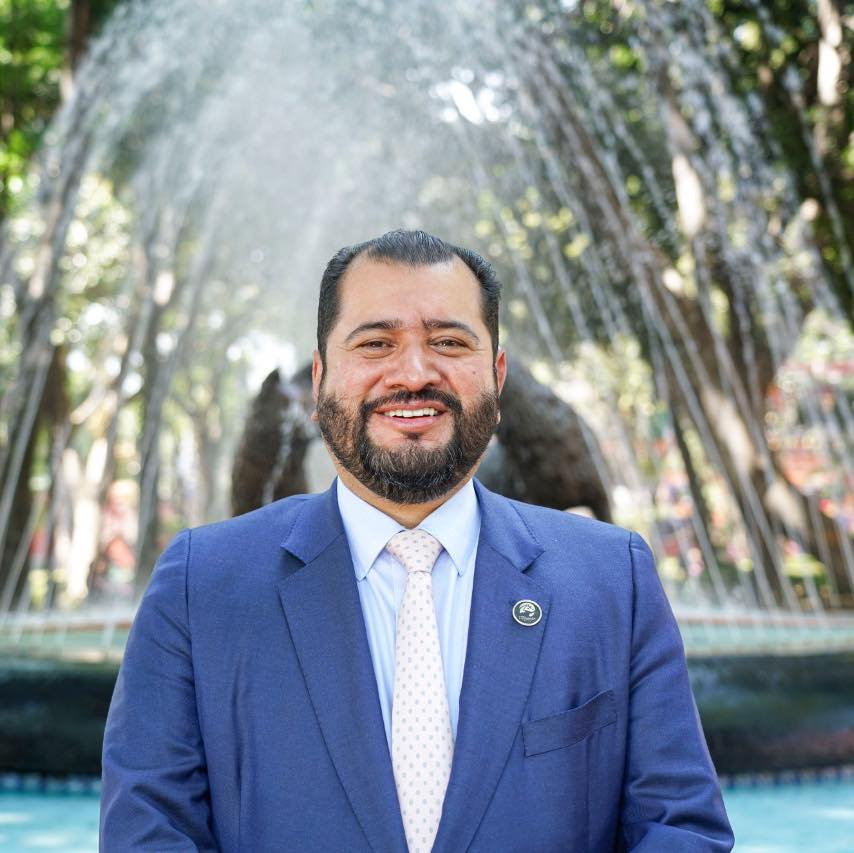
- Born: 17 October 1974 (age 51); Ayutla de los Libres, Guerrero, Mexico
- Occupation: Politician
- Political party: PAN

Obdulio Ávila Mayo (born 17 October 1974) is a Mexican politician from the National Action Party. From 2006 to 2009 he served as Deputy of the LX Legislature of the Mexican Congress representing the Federal District.
