= Ana María Ramírez Cerda =

Mexican politician

- Born: 30 September 1954 (age 71); Monterrey, Nuevo León, Mexico
- Occupation: Politician
- Political party: PVEM

Ana María Ramírez Cerda (born 30 September 1954) is a Mexican politician from the Ecologist Green Party of Mexico. From 2006 to 2009 she served as Deputy of the LX Legislature of the Mexican Congress representing Nuevo León.
