= María Jiménez del Castillo =

Mexican politician

- Born: 2 August 1964 (age 61); Río Verde, San Luis Potosí, Mexico
- Occupation: Politician
- Political party: PAN

María de los Ángeles Jiménez del Castillo (born 2 August 1964) is a Mexican politician from the National Action Party. From 2006 to 2009 she served as Deputy of the LX Legislature of the Mexican Congress representing Querétaro.
