= Jesús Ramírez Rangel =

Mexican politician

- Born: 1 April 1978 (age 48); Piedras Negras Coahuila, Mexico
- Status: Married
- Education: Lawyer Anahuac University. MSc Government London School of Economics
- Occupation: Politician
- Political party: PAN
- Spouse: Karla Elizondo
- Children: 5

Jesús Ramírez Rangel (born 1 April 1978) is a Mexican politician from the National Action Party. From 2009 to 2012 he served as Deputy of the LXI Legislature of the Mexican Congress representing Coahuila.
