= Martha Lucía Mícher =

Mexican politician

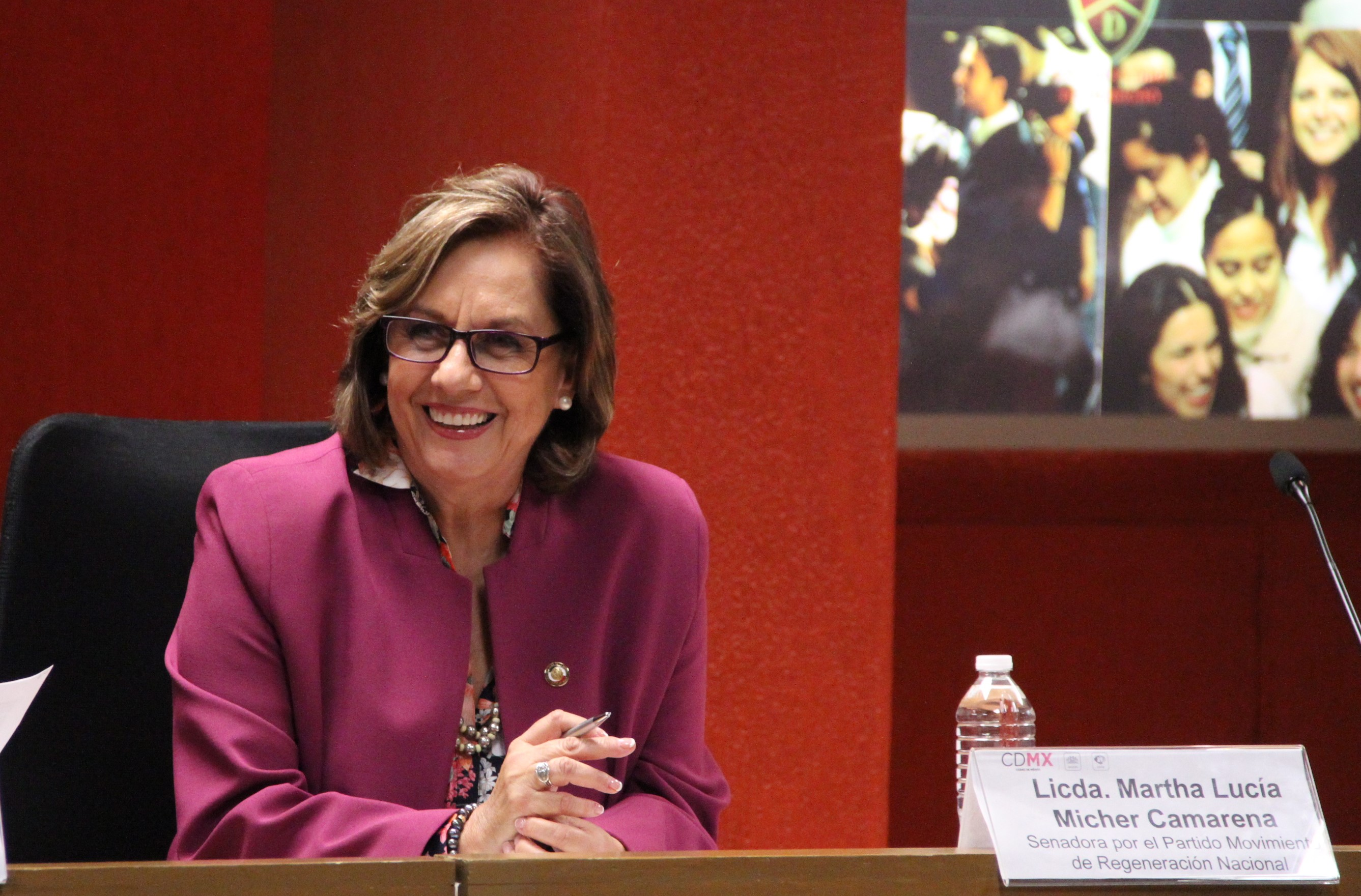
- Mícher in 2018

Senator of the Congress of the Union by proportional representation
- Incumbent
- Assumed office 1 September 2024

Senator of the Congress of the Union for Guanajuato
- In office 1 September 2018 – 31 August 2024 Serving with Alejandra Noemí Reynoso Sánchez and Erandi Bermúdez Méndez
- Preceded by: Miguel Ángel Chico Herrera

Personal details
- Born: 11 February 1954 (age 72) Cuauhtémoc, D.F., Mexico
- Party: MORENA
- Other political affiliations: PRD (pre-2015)
- Occupation: Politician

Martha Lucía Mícher Camarena (Note: In this Mexican name, the surname is Mícher and the second or maternal family name is Camarena.) (born 11 February 1954), also known as Malú Mícher, is a Mexican politician currently affiliated with National Regeneration Movement (Morena) who previously belonged to the Party of the Democratic Revolution (PRD). After serving two terms in the Chamber of Deputies, she was a senator representing the state of Guanajuato in the 64th and 65th Congresses, and she was re-elected to a national-list Senate seat in the 2024 general election.

== Early life and education ==
She was born on 11 February 1954 in Mexico City. She has a degree in pedagogy from the Universidad Panamericana, and has participated in several organizations of the left and fought for the equality of women. This includes several events organized by the Socialist International on behalf of the Party of the Democratic Revolution (PRD), and she was also member of the Mexican delegation to the World Conference of Women held in Beijing, China, in 1995.

== Political career ==
Mícher ran for governor of Guanajuato in the 1995 election; she came third behind Vicente Fox and PRI candidate Ignacio Vázquez Torres, but obtained an important influence for her party, which was practically nonexistent before her candidacy. Mícher was a deputy in the Guanajuato state legislature from 1997 to 2000, and she ran unsuccessfully for municipal president of León in 2000.

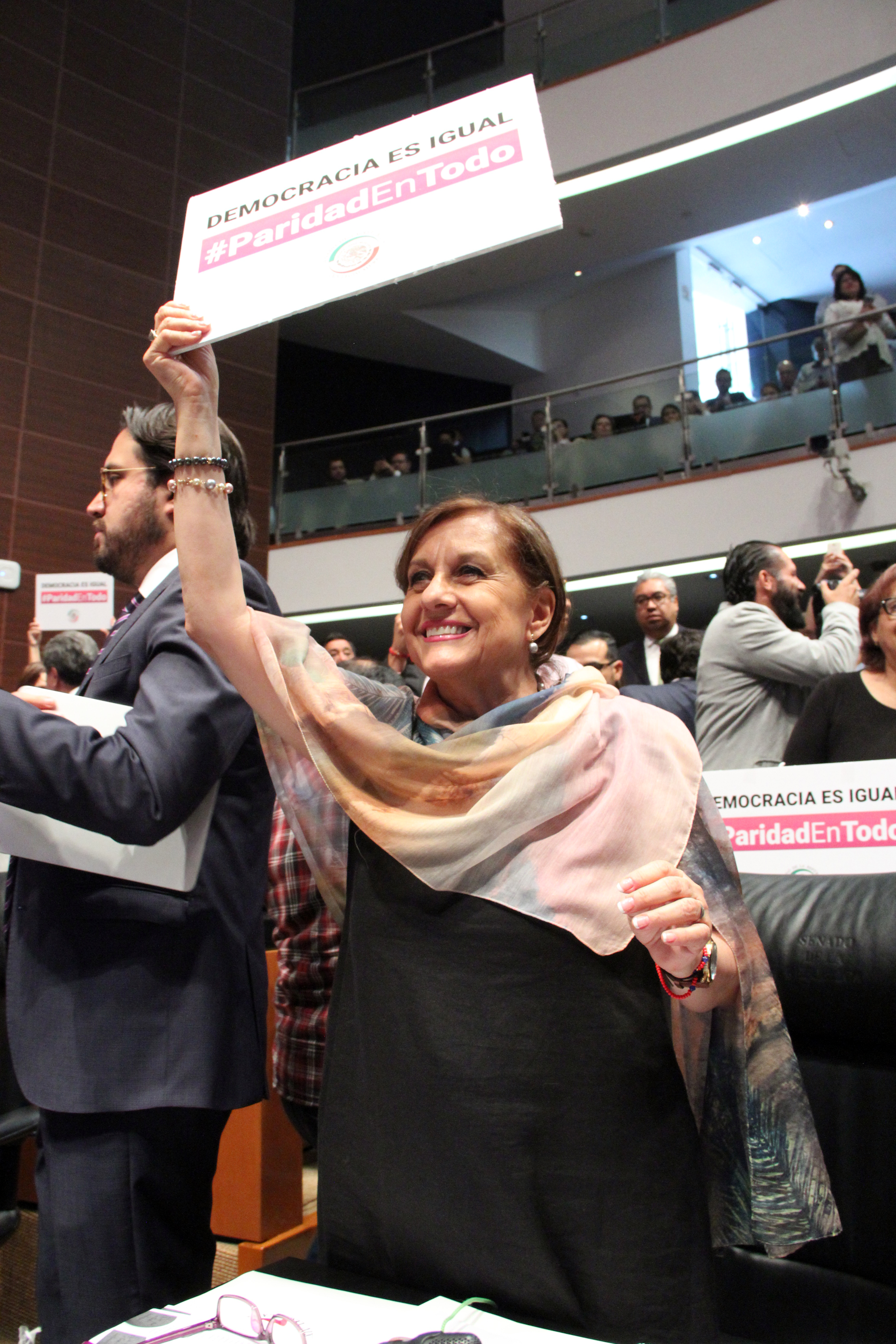
Mícher in 2019

From 2000 to 2002, she was the women's secretary of the National Executive Committee of the PRD.

From 2003 to 2006 she was a plurinominal deputy for the PRD in the 59th Congress. Between 2012 and 2015 she returned to the Chamber of Deputies for the 62nd Congress, representing the Federal District's 14th district on the PRD ticket.

She left the PRD for Morena in 2015 and won election to Guanajuato's third seat in the Senate in the 2018 general election. In 2024, she was re-elected to the Senate for the 66th and 67th Congresses from Morena's national list.
