= Camarena (disambiguation) =

Camarena may refer to:

== Places ==
- Camarena, a municipality located in the province of Toledo, Castile-La Mancha, Spain
- Camarena de la Sierra, a municipality located in the province of Teruel, Aragon, Spain

== People ==
- Alfredo Ríos Camarena (born 1935), Mexican politician
- Consuelo Camarena (born 1943), Mexican politician
- Enrique Camarena Robles (born 1957), Mexican psychiatrist
- Enrique Camarena (DEA agent) (1947–1985), Special Agent, United States Drug Enforcement Administration (DEA)
- Felipe Arturo Camarena (born 1956), Mexican politician
- Gene Camarena, American businessman
- Guillermo González Camarena (1917–1965), Mexican electrical engineer who was the inventor of a color-wheel type of color television
- Héctor Michel Camarena (born 1948), Mexican politician
- Javier Camarena (born 1976), Mexican operatic tenor
- Jillian Camarena-Williams (born 1982), American track and field athlete in the shot put
- Jorge González Camarena (1908–1980), Mexican painter, muralist and sculptor
- Juan Carlos Martínez Camarena (born 1991), Mexican footballer
- Juan Manuel Silva Camarena (born 1945), Mexican philosopher, Cathedratic Professor and academic functionary
- Karla Valentina Camarena (1986 or 1987 - 2020), Mexican trans activist
- Kiki Camarena (1947–1985), an American undercover agent for the United States Drug Enforcement Administration (DEA) who was abducted on February 7, 1985, and then tortured and murdered, while on assignment in Mexico
- Meghan Camarena (born 1987) known by her online pseudonym Strawburry17, an American YouTube personality and television host
- Yolanda Camarena, American education professional and philanthropist

== See also ==
- Chon (band), an American progressive rock and math rock band made up of Mario Camarena, Erick Hansel, Esiah Camarena and Nathan Camarena
