= Timeline of León, Mexico =

Coordinates: 21.116667°N 101.683333°W

The following is a timeline of the history of the city of León, Guanajuato, Mexico.

== Prior to 20th century ==
- 1576 - León founded by Spaniards.
- 1582 - Cárcel Municipal de León (Guanajuato) (jail) built.
- 1767 - Iglesia de La Compañia Nueva (León) (church) built.
- 1792 - Population: 23,711 town; 54,952 parish.
- 1836 - León attains city status.
- 1856 - León Municipal Palace built.
- 1863 - Catholic Diocese of León established.
- 1866 - Cathedral of León, Guanajuato consecrated.
- 1880 - Teatro Doblado (theatre) opens.
- 1882 - Population: 70,022 city; 172,432 parish.
- 1889 - Flood. 2,000 homes were destroyed and 245 bodies were found.
- 1895 - Population: 90,978.
- 1896 - Heroes' Causeway Arch erected.
- 1900 - Population: 62,623.

== 20th century ==
- 1901 - Teatro del Círculo Leonés Mutualista (theatre) founded.
- 1915 - León becomes capital of Guanajuato state.
- 1921 - Templo Expiatorio del Sagrado Corazón de Jesús (León) (church) construction begins.
- 1926 - June: Flood.
- 1928 - Partido Socialista Leones (labor group) and Unión de Curtidores football club formed.
- 1943 - Club León football club formed.
- 1945 - Union Civica Leonesa (political group) founded.
- 1946
  - 2 January: Political protest; crackdown.
  - El Sol de León newspaper in publication.
- 1948 - Archivo Histórico Municipal de León (city archive) inaugurated.
- 1950 - Population: 122,585.
- 1965 - Boletín del Archivo Municipal de León (history journal) begins publication.
- 1967 - Estadio León (stadium) opens.
- 1969 - Sister city relationship established with San Diego, USA.
- 1972 - Instituto Tecnológico de León established.
- 1978 - Convention Center established.
- 1979 - León Zoological Park opens.
- 1988 - Carlos Medina Plascencia becomes mayor.
- 1990 - Del Bajío International Airport opens near city.
- 1991 - Eliseo Pérez Martínez becomes mayor.
- 2000 - Cultural Institute of Leon and Teatro María Grever (theatre) established.

== 21st century ==
- 2002 - León Hot Air Balloon Festival begins.
- 2003
  - Optibús transit system begins operating.
  - Ricardo Alaníz Posada becomes mayor.
- 2004 - Lechugueros de León basketball team formed.
- 2005 - Population: 1,278,087 municipality.
- 2006
  - 6 July: 2006 Guanajuato state election held.
  - Vicente Guerrero Reynoso becomes mayor.
- 2008 - Museo de Arte e Historia de Guanajuato (museum) opens.
- 2009 - Francisco Ricardo Sheffield Padilla becomes mayor.
- 2010
  - Teatro del Bicentenario (theatre) opens.
  - Population: 1,436,480 municipality.
- 2012 - 23 March: Catholic pope visits city.

== See also ==
- León history (es)
- List of mayors of León, Mexico
- Guanajuato history (state)

== Bibliography ==
=== In English ===
Published in the 19th century

- Alfred Ronald Conkling (1893), "Leon", Appletons' Guide to Mexico, New York: D. Appleton & Company
- Henry Moore (1894), "Commercial Directory: Leon", Railway Guide of the Republic of Mexico, Springfield, Ohio: Huben & Moore, OCLC 22498265

Published in the 20th century

- Reau Campbell (1909), "Leon", Campbell's New Revised Complete Guide and Descriptive Book of Mexico, Chicago: Rogers & Smith Co., OCLC 1667015
- "León (Mexico)" . Encyclopædia Britannica. Vol. 16 (11th ed.). 1910. p. 443.
- Herbermann, Charles George (1910). "Leon". Catholic Encyclopedia. New York.
- W.H. Koebel, ed. (1921), "Mexico: Chief Towns: Leon", Anglo-South American Handbook, vol. 1, New York: Macmillan, hdl:2027/mdp.39015027978728
- Ernst B. Filsinger (1922), "Mexico: Leon", Commercial Travelers' Guide to Latin America, Washington, DC: Government Printing Office
- D. A. Brading & Celia Wu (1973). "Population Growth and Crisis: Leon, 1720-1860". Journal of Latin American Studies. 5 (1): 1–36. doi:10.1017/S0022216X00002200. JSTOR 156000. PMID 11614758. S2CID 46572827.
- Baedeker's Mexico, Baedekers Guides, 1994, p. 269, OL 11077410M (fulltext via OpenLibrary)
- "North Central Highlands: Leon", Mexico, Lonely Planet, 1998, OL 8314651M (fulltext via OpenLibrary)

Published in the 21st century

- Daniel Newcomer (2002). "Symbolic Battleground: The Culture of Modernization in 1940s León, Guanajuato". Mexican Studies. 18.
- Daniel Newcomer (2004). Reconciling Modernity: Urban State Formation in 1940s Leon, Mexico. University of Nebraska Press. ISBN 0-8032-3349-3.

=== In Spanish ===
- Luis Manrique, Brevísima relación histórica . .. de la ciudad de León (León, 1854)
- Antonio García Cubas [in Spanish] (1896). "Leon". Diccionario Geográfico, Histórico y Biográfico de los Estados Unidos Mexicanos (in Spanish). Vol. 3. México: Antigua Imprenta de las Escalerillas. hdl:2027/coo.31924056282340 – via HathiTrust. + via Google Books
- Wigberto Jiménez Moreno, "Ciudad de León", Enciclopedia de México (Mexico City, 1974)
