= Wintilo Vega =

Mexican politician

- Born: 13 March 1962 (age 64); Purísima del Rincón, Guanajuato, Mexico
- Education: UNAM
- Occupation: Politician
- Political party: PRI (1979–2006), PSD

Wintilo Vega Murillo (born 13 March 1962) is a Mexican politician formerly affiliated with the Institutional Revolutionary Party (PRI).

Vega Murillo was born in Purísima del Rincón, Guanajuato, and holds a degree in economics from the National Autonomous University of Mexico (UNAM).

He was elected to two terms in the Chamber of Deputies for the PRI: in 1997 (57th Congress), for Guanajuato's 11th district, and in 2003 (59th Congress), as a plurinominal deputy for the 1st region.

He was selected as the PRI's candidate for governor of Guanajuato in the 2 July 2006 state election but resigned his candidacy on 21 March over a dispute about the allocation of candidacies for the 2006 federal elections to be held on the same day. He was replaced by Miguel Ángel Chico Herrera, who went on to lose to Juan Manuel Oliva Ramírez of the National Action Party (PAN).

He was sworn in as the state president of the Social Democratic Party (PSD) on 14 November 2008.
