= Miguel Hernández (disambiguation) =

Miguel Hernández (1910–1942) was a Spanish poet and playwright.

Miguel Hernández or Miguel Hernandez is also the name of:

== Politicians ==
- Miguel Hernández Agosto (1927–2016), Puerto Rican politician
- Miguel Luna Hernández (1953–2017), Mexican Party of the Democratic Revolution politician
- Miguel Gutiérrez Hernández (born 1963), Mexican National Action Party politician

== Sportspeople ==
- Miguel Hernández (footballer, born 1970), Spanish football manager and former centre-back
- Miguel Hernandez (boxer) (born 1974), American boxer
- Miguel Javid Hernández (born 1976), Mexican football player and manager
- Miguel Hernández (footballer, born 1984), Chilean football midfielder

== See also ==
- Miguel Hernández (Madrid Metro)
