= 11th federal electoral district of Guanajuato =

Federal electoral district of Mexico

Guanajuato's 11th
- Electoral district of the Chamber of Deputies of Mexico

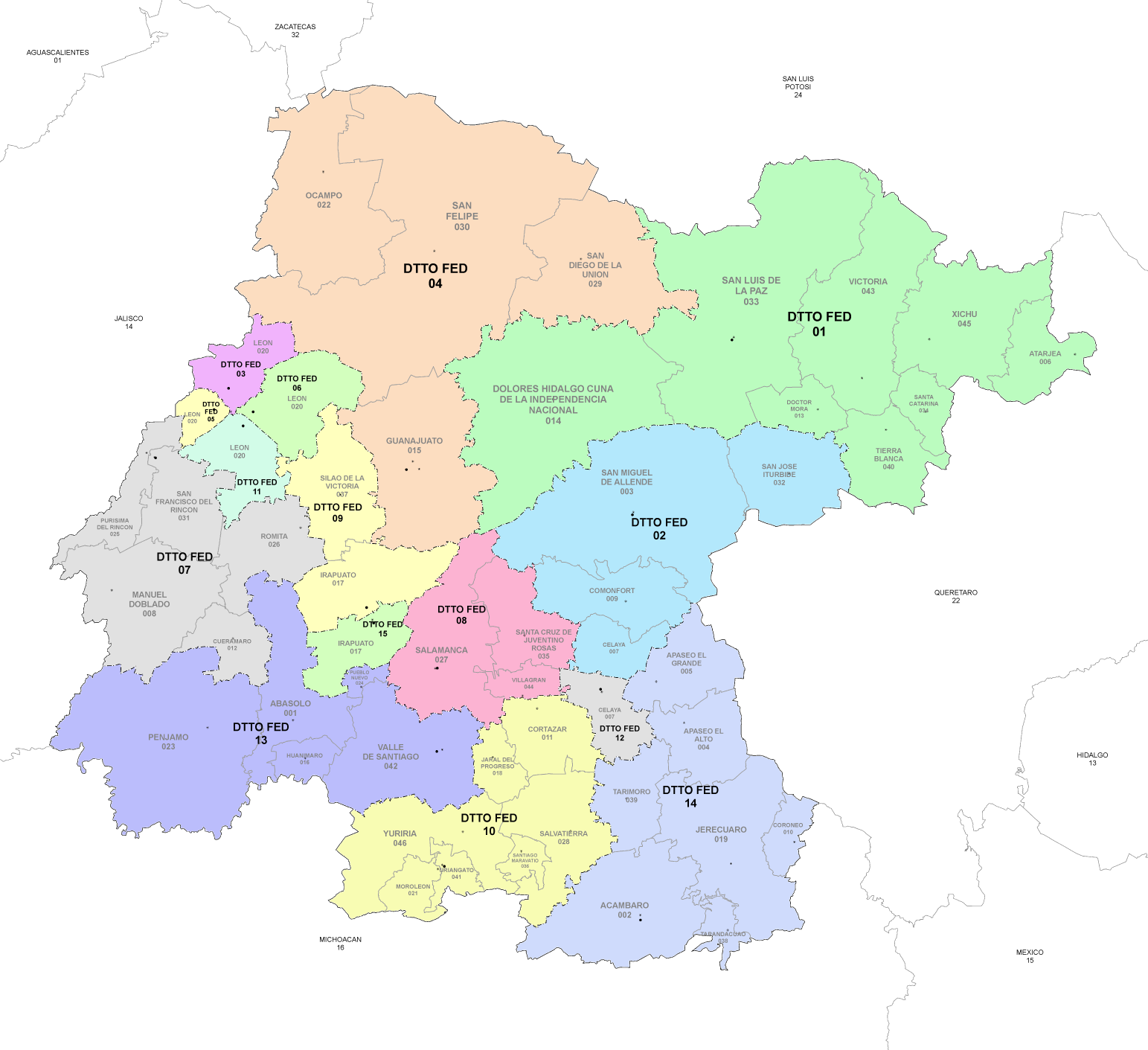
- 11th district since 2023

Incumbent
- Member: Miguel Salim Alle
- Party: ▌National Action Party
- Congress: 66th (2024–2027)

District
- State: Guanajuato
- Head town: León de Los Aldama
- Coordinates: 21°07′N 101°41′W
- Covers: Municipality of León (part)
- PR region: Second
- Precincts: 171
- Population: 430,097 (2020 census)

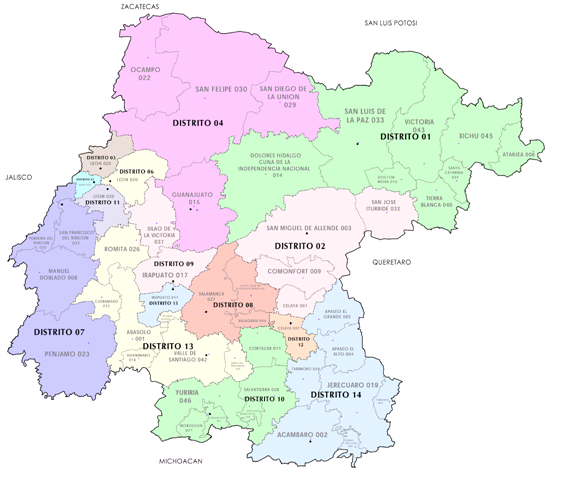
Guanajuato's districts in 2017–2022

The 11th federal electoral district of Guanajuato (Spanish: Distrito electoral federal 11 de Guanajuato) is one of the 300 electoral districts into which Mexico is divided for elections to the federal Chamber of Deputies and one of 15 such districts in the state of Guanajuato.

It elects one deputy to the lower house of Congress for each three-year legislative session by means of the first-past-the-post system. Votes cast in the district also count towards the calculation of proportional representation ("plurinominal") deputies elected from the second region.

Suspended in 1930, (Note: An amendment to Article 52 of the Constitution in 1928 changed the original provision of "one deputy per 60,000 inhabitants" to "one deputy per 100,000"; as a result, the size of the Chamber of Deputies fell from 281 in the 1928 election to 171 in 1934.) Guanajuato's 11th was re-established as part of the 1977 political reforms. The restored district returned its first deputy in the 1979 mid-term election.

The current member for the district, elected in the 2024 general election, is Miguel Ángel Salim Alle of the National Action Party (PAN).

== District territory ==
Under the 2023 districting plan adopted by the National Electoral Institute (INE), which is to be used for the 2024, 2027 and 2030 federal elections, Guanajuato's 11th district covers 171 electoral precincts (secciones electorales) across the southern portion of the municipality of León. (Note: The 3rd, 5th and 6th districts cover the remainder of the municipality.)

The head town (cabecera distrital), where results from individual polling stations are gathered together and tallied, is the city of León. The district reported a population of 430,097 in the 2020 census.

== Previous districting schemes ==
Evolution of electoral district numbers
	1974	1978	1996	2005	2017	2023
Guanajuato	9	13	15	14	15	15
Chamber of Deputies	196	300				

2017–2022

Between 2017 and 2022, the 11th district's head town was at León and it covered 124 precincts in the south of the municipality.

2005–2017

Under the 2005 plan, Guanajuato had only 14 districts. This district's head town was at Pénjamo and it covered five municipalities in the south and south-west of the state:
- Abasolo, Manuel Doblado, Cuerámaro, Huanímaro and Pénjamo.

1996–2005

In the 1996 scheme, under which Guanajuato was assigned 15 seats, the district had its head town at Pénjamo and it comprised three municipalities:
- Abasolo, Huanímaro and Pénjamo.

1978–1996

The districting scheme in force from 1978 to 1996 was the result of the 1977 electoral reforms, which increased the number of single-member seats in the Chamber of Deputies from 196 to 300. Under that plan, Guanajuato's seat allocation rose from 9 to 13. The new 11th district's head town was at León and it covered a part of that city.

== Deputies returned to Congress ==
(Mexico) National parties
- Current
- PAN
- PRI
- PT
- PVEM
- MC
- Morena
- PAZ
- Somos
- Defunct or local only
- PLM
- PNR
- PRM
- PNM
- PP
- PPS
- PARM
- PFCRN
- CON
- PANAL
- PSD
- PES
- PES
- PRD

Guanajuato's 11th district
Election	Deputy	Party	Term	Legislature
1912	José Natividad Macías	PNA	1912–1913	26th Congress
1916	Ignacio López		1916–1917	Constituent Congress of Querétaro
...
The 11th district was suspended between 1930 and 1979
1979	Gabriel Appelt Harald	Institutional Revolutionary Party	1979–1982	51st Congress
1982	Rodolfo Padilla Padilla	Institutional Revolutionary Party	1982–1985	52nd Congress
1985	José de Jesús Padilla Padilla	Institutional Revolutionary Party	1985–1988	53rd Congress
1988	José Pedro Gama Medina	National Action Party (Mexico)	1988–1991	54th Congress
1991	Luis Fernández Vega	National Action Party (Mexico)	1991–1994	55th Congress
1994	Humberto Andrade Quezada	National Action Party (Mexico)	1994–1997	56th Congress
1997	Wintilo Vega Murillo	Institutional Revolutionary Party	1997–2000	57th Congress
2000	Martín Gerardo Morales Barragán	National Action Party (Mexico)	2000–2003	58th Congress
2003	Erandi Bermúdez Méndez	National Action Party (Mexico)	2003–2006	59th Congress
2006	Ramón Landeros González	National Action Party (Mexico)	2006–2009	60th Congress
2009	Erandi Bermúdez Méndez	National Action Party (Mexico)	2009–2012	61st Congress
2012	Ma. Concepción Navarrete Vital	Institutional Revolutionary Party	2012–2015	62nd Congress
2015	Erandi Bermúdez Méndez	National Action Party (Mexico)	2015–2018	63rd Congress
2018	Jorge Arturo Espadas Galván	National Action Party (Mexico)	2018–2021	64th Congress
2021	Jorge Arturo Espadas Galván	National Action Party (Mexico)	2021–2024	65th Congress
2024	Miguel Ángel Salim Alle	National Action Party (Mexico)	2024–2027	66th Congress

== Presidential elections ==
Guanajuato's 11th district
Election	District won by	Party or coalition	%
2018	Ricardo Anaya Cortés	Por México al Frente	50.5395
2024	Bertha Xóchitl Gálvez Ruiz	Fuerza y Corazón por México	48.7955
