= 1995 Guanajuato gubernatorial election =

← 1991	28 May 1995	2000 →
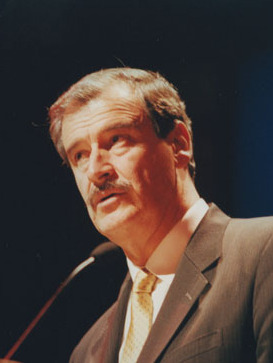

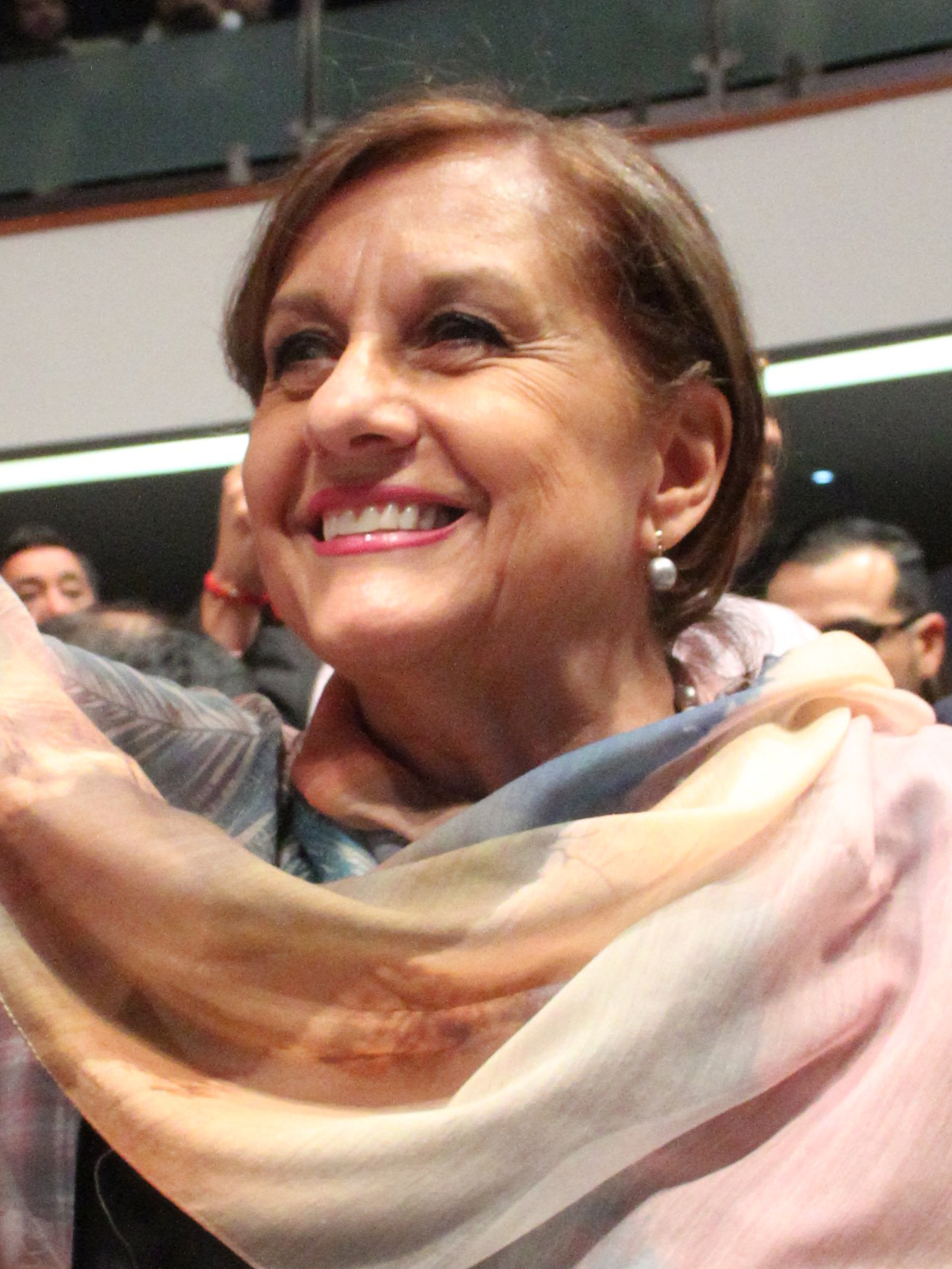
Nominee	Vicente Fox	Ignacio Vázquez Torres	Martha Lucía Mícher Camarena
Party	PAN	PRI	PRD
Popular vote	723,337	409,578	87,438
Percentage	58.1 %	32.9%	7.0%
Governor before election
Carlos Medina Plascencia (interim)
PAN
Elected Governor
Vicente Fox
PAN

The 1995 Guanajuato gubernatorial election was held on Sunday, 28 May 1995, for the position of governor of the Mexican state of Guanajuato. The election was won by Vicente Fox, a member of the National Action Party (PAN) and former member of the Chamber of Deputies who had run for governor in the disputed 1991 election.

Fox's victory made him the fourth PAN member elected governor of a Mexican state. His victory over the PRI was considered a repudiation of the party, which had ruled Mexico for several decades. Fox served as governor until resigning in 1999 to mount a successful bid for the presidency in 2000.

== Background ==
Fox, then a member of the Chamber of Deputies for Guanajuato's 3rd district, ran for governor in the 1991 election, facing Institutional Revolutionary Party (PRI) candidate Ramón Aguirre Velázquez. At the time, Guanajuato had had a PRI member as governor for decades. In a disputed race, Aguirre Velázquez was declared the winner over Fox, but ultimately declined to take office amid accusations of fraud.

Mayor of León Carlos Medina Plascencia (PAN) was chosen to serve as interim governor by the Congress of Guanajuato in September 1991 before new elections could be held.

== Campaign and election ==
Preliminary data released in 1995 found that Fox defeated PRI candidate Ignacio Vázquez Torres in 32 of the state's 46 municipalities. Fox won a majority of the vote in the four largest cities in the state, performing best in the cities of León and Irapuato, while winning by a more narrow margin in the city of Guanajuato.

=== Impact and legacy ===
The Los Angeles Times reported that Fox's victory could be credited to voters' "fury at government mismanagement that led to the economic crisis and at the unpopular measures that followed it" under the PRI. In its write-up, The Los Angeles Times noted that PRI president Ernesto Zedillo had won the state in the 1994 presidential election, and that Fox's victory could "launch his bid to be Mexico's first opposition party president in seven decades".

The election was held on the same day as Yucatán's competitive gubernatorial election, in which PAN's candidate lost by a narrow margin. The Los Angeles Times characterized the results of the two elections as "herald[ing] a new era of fierce competition between Mexico's ruling party and the conservative National Action Party".

Fox's victory made him the fourth PAN member elected governor of a Mexican state. President Zedillo congratulated Fox on his apparent victory when election returns came in. Fox served as governor until 1999, when he resigned to successfully run for president in the 2000 election. Guanajuato would emerge as a stronghold for PAN in decades to come, with every governor from 1991 to present being a member of the party as of 2024.

== Results ==
1995 Guanajuato gubernatorial election
Party	Candidate	Votes	%
PAN	Vicente Fox	723,337	58.1%
PRI	Ignacio Vázquez Torres	409,578	32.9%
PRD	Martha Lucía Mícher Camarena	87,438	7.0%
PT	Salvador Arévalo Maldonado	14,833	1.2%
PFCRN	Israel González Arreguín	9,769	0.8%
