= Éctor Jaime Ramírez Barba =

Mexican surgeon and politician

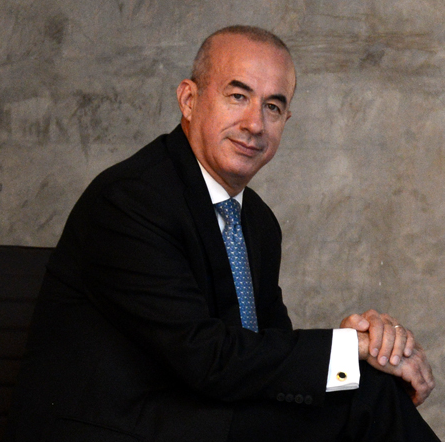

Deputy of the Congress of the Union for the 5th district of Guanajuato
- Incumbent
- Assumed office 1 September 2018
- Preceded by: Alejandra Noemí Reynoso Sánchez

Personal details
- Born: 1 December 1956 (age 69) León, Guanajuato, Mexico
- Party: PAN
- Occupation: Surgeon and politician

Éctor Jaime Ramírez Barba (born 1 December 1956) is a Mexican surgeon and politician affiliated with the National Action Party (PAN).

Ramírez Barba has been elected to the Chamber of Deputies for Guanajuato's 5th district, which includes his home town of León, on four occasions: in 2006 (60th Congress), in 2018 (64th Congress), in 2021 (65th Congress), and in 2024 (66th Congress).
