= Tomás Gutiérrez (disambiguation) =

Tomás Gutiérrez (Tomás Francisco Gutiérrez Chávez; 1817–1872) was a Peruvian Army colonel, coup plotter, and de facto head of state for four days in 1872.

Tomás Gutiérrez may also refer to:

- Tomás Gutiérrez Díez (1878–1964), Spanish prelate, bishop of the Roman Catholic Diocese of Cádiz y Ceuta (1943–1964)
- Tomás Gutiérrez Larraya (1886–1968), Spanish painter, writer and actor, appeared in Vida en sombras (1949)
- Tomás Gutiérrez Alea (1928–1996), Cuban film director and screenwriter
- Tomás Gutiérrez (basketball) (Tomás Gutiérrez Ferrer; 1940–2018), Puerto Rican basketball player
- Tomás Gutiérrez Ramírez (born 1969), Mexican politician
