= 6th federal electoral district of Guanajuato =

Federal electoral district of Mexico

Guanajuato's 6th
- Electoral district of the Chamber of Deputies of Mexico

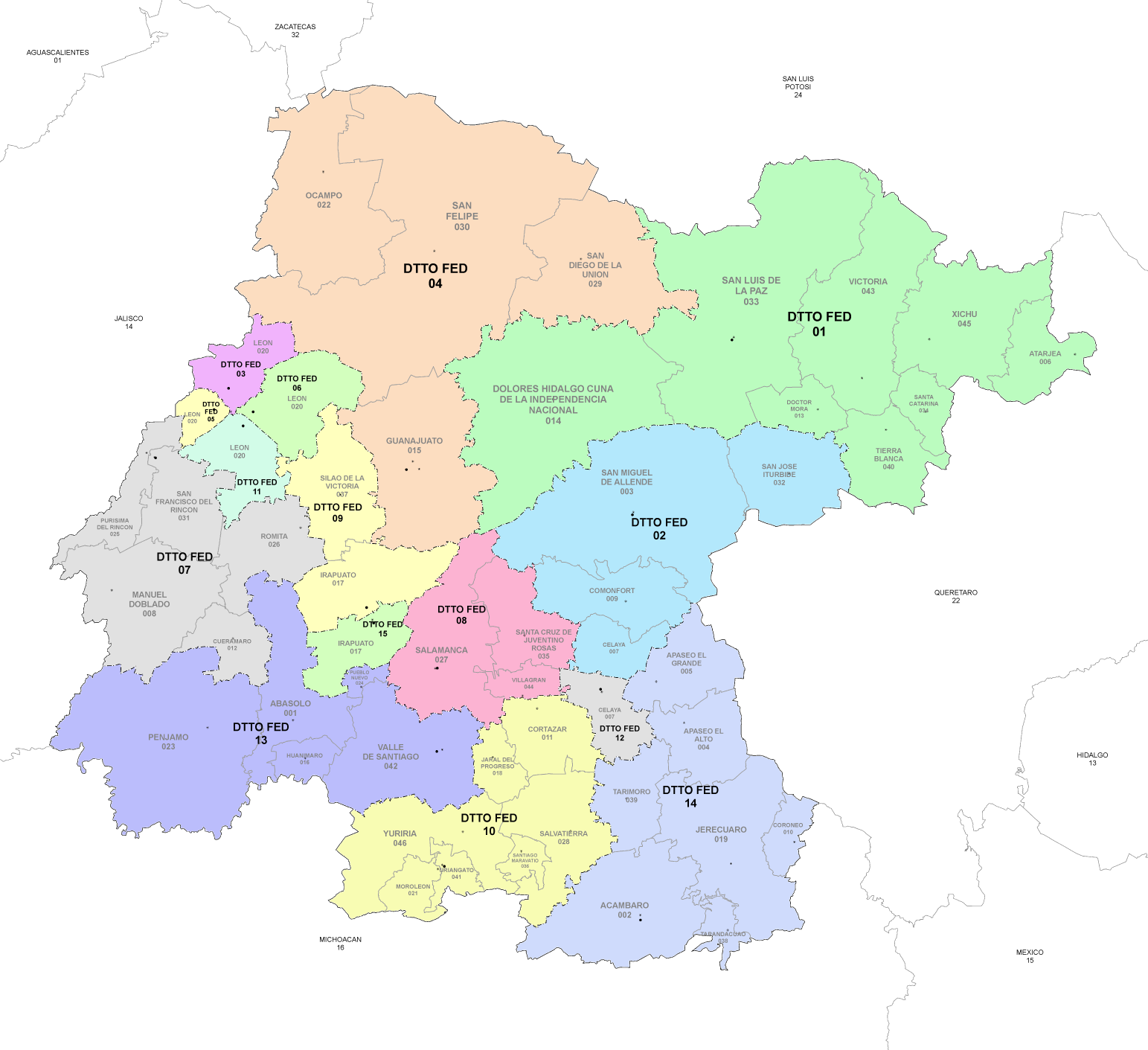
- 6th district since 2023

Incumbent
- Member: Laura Cristina Márquez
- Party: ▌National Action Party
- Congress: 66th (2024–2027)

District
- State: Guanajuato
- Head town: León de Los Aldama
- Coordinates: 21°07′N 101°41′W
- Covers: Municipality of León (part)
- PR region: Second
- Precincts: 192
- Population: 427,910 (2020 census)

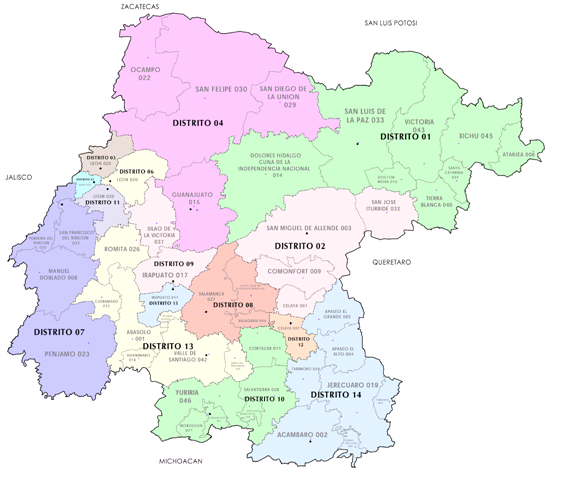
Guanajuato's districts in 2017–2022

The 6th federal electoral district of Guanajuato (Spanish: Distrito electoral federal 06 de Guanajuato) is one of the 300 electoral districts into which Mexico is divided for elections to the federal Chamber of Deputies and one of 15 such districts in the state of Guanajuato.

It elects one deputy to the lower house of Congress for each three-year legislative session by means of the first-past-the-post system. Votes cast in the district also count towards the calculation of proportional representation ("plurinominal") deputies elected from the second region.

The current member for the district, elected in the 2024 general election, is Laura Cristina Márquez Alcalá of the National Action Party (PAN).

== District territory ==
Under the 2023 districting plan adopted by the National Electoral Institute (INE), which is to be used for the 2024, 2027 and 2030 federal elections, Guanajuato's 6th district covers 192 electoral precincts (secciones electorales) across the eastern portion of the municipality of León. (Note: The 3rd, 5th and 11th districts cover the remainder of the municipality.)

The head town (cabecera distrital), where results from individual polling stations are gathered together and tallied, is the city of León. The district reported a population of 427,910 in the 2020 census.

== Previous districting schemes ==
Evolution of electoral district numbers
	1974	1978	1996	2005	2017	2023
Guanajuato	9	13	15	14	15	15
Chamber of Deputies	196	300				

2017–2022

Between 2017 and 2022, the 6th district's head town was at León and it covered 243 precincts in the east of the municipality.

2005–2017

Under the 2005 plan, Guanajuato had only 14 districts. This district's head town was at León and it covered 203 precincts in the south of the municipality.

1996–2005

In the 1996 scheme, under which Guanajuato was assigned 15 seats, the district had its head town at León and it comprised 187 precincts in the south of the municipality.

1978–1996

The districting scheme in force from 1978 to 1996 was the result of the 1977 electoral reforms, which increased the number of single-member seats in the Chamber of Deputies from 196 to 300. Under that plan, Guanajuato's seat allocation rose from 9 to 13. The 6th district's head town was at Salamanca and it covered four municipalities:
- Abasolo, Huanímaro, Pueblo Nuevo and Salamanca.

== Deputies returned to Congress ==
(Mexico) National parties
- Current
- PAN
- PRI
- PT
- PVEM
- MC
- Morena
- PAZ
- Somos
- Defunct or local only
- PLM
- PNR
- PRM
- PNM
- PP
- PPS
- PARM
- PFCRN
- CON
- PANAL
- PSD
- PES
- PES
- PRD

Guanajuato's 6th district
Election	Deputy	Party	Term	Legislature
1916	José Villaseñor Lomelí		1916–1917	Constituent Congress of Querétaro
...
1976	Alfredo Carrillo Juárez	Institutional Revolutionary Party	1976–1979	50th Congress
1979	Gilberto Muñoz Mosqueda	Institutional Revolutionary Party	1979–1982	51st Congress
1982	Javier Martínez Aguilera	Institutional Revolutionary Party	1982–1985	52nd Congress
1985	Alberto Fabián Carrillo Flores	Institutional Revolutionary Party	1985–1988	53rd Congress
1988	Gilberto Muñoz Mosqueda	Institutional Revolutionary Party	1988–1991	54th Congress
1991	Ernesto Botello Martínez	Institutional Revolutionary Party	1991–1994	55th Congress
1994	Fernando Pacheco Martínez	Institutional Revolutionary Party	1994–1997	56th Congress
1997	Arturo Saiz Calderón García	National Action Party (Mexico)	1997–2000	57th Congress
2000	Joel Vilches Mares	National Action Party (Mexico)	2000–2003	58th Congress
2003	Salvador Márquez Lozornio	National Action Party (Mexico)	2003–2006	59th Congress
2006	Adriana Rodríguez Vizcarra Velázquez	National Action Party (Mexico)	2006–2009	60th Congress
2009	Jaime Oliva Ramírez	National Action Party (Mexico)	2009–2012	61st Congress
2012	Rosa Elba Pérez Hernández	Ecologist Green Party of Mexico	2012–2015	62nd Congress
2015	Alejandra Gutiérrez Campos	National Action Party (Mexico)	2015–2018	63rd Congress
2018	María del Pilar Ortega Martínez	National Action Party (Mexico)	2018–2021	64th Congress
2021	Ana María Esquivel Arrona (Note: Esquivel Arrona resigned her seat on 20 August 2023 and was replaced for the remainder of her term by her alternate, Rodríguez Vallejo.); Alma Cristina Rodríguez Vallejo	National Action Party (Mexico)	2021–2024	65th Congress
2024	Laura Cristina Márquez Alcalá	National Action Party (Mexico)	2024–2027	66th Congress

== Presidential elections ==
Guanajuato's 6th district
Election	District won by	Party or coalition	%
2018	Ricardo Anaya Cortés	Por México al Frente	51.8753
2024	Bertha Xóchitl Gálvez Ruiz	Fuerza y Corazón por México	48.8813
