= Pilar Ortega =

Pilar Ortega may refer to:

- Pilar Ortega Martínez (born 1968), Mexican politician
- Pilar Ortega, character on U.S. soap opera Falcon Crest
