= Miguel Gutiérrez =

Miguel Gutiérrez may refer to:

== Arts and entertainment ==
- Miguel Gutiérrez (writer) (1940–2016), Peruvian novelist
- Miguel Gutierrez (choreographer) (born 1971), American dancer and choreographer

== Politics ==
- Miguel Jerónimo Gutiérrez (1822–1871), Cuban revolutionary, politician, and military officer
- Miguel Gutiérrez Hernández (born 1963), Mexican politician

== Sports ==
=== Association football ===
- Miguel Gutiérrez (footballer, born 1931) (1931–2016), Mexican football forward
- Miguel Gutiérrez (footballer, born 1956), Peruvian football midfielder
- Miguel Gutiérrez (footballer, born 2001), Spanish football left-back

=== Other sports ===
- Miguel Gutiérrez (cyclist) (born 1954), Spanish cyclist
- Miguel Gutiérrez (volleyball) (born 1997), Cuban volleyball player
