= Oviedo (disambiguation) =

Oviedo is a city in Spain and the capital of comarca Oviedo.

Oviedo may also refer to:

== People ==
- Bryan Oviedo (born 1990), Costa Rican association football player
- Ernesto Oviedo Oviedo (born 1953), Mexican politician
- Frankie Oviedo (born 1973), Colombian footballer and coach
- Gonzalo Fernández de Oviedo y Valdés (1478–1557), Castilian writer and historian
- Joaquín Oviedo (born 2001), Argentine rugby union player
- Johan Oviedo (born 1998), Cuban baseball player
- Juan Carlos Oviedo (born 1982), Dominican Republican baseball player (AKA Leo Núñez)
- Lino Oviedo (born 1943), Paraguayan politician
- Lucas Oviedo (born 1985), Argentine association football player
- Luis Oviedo (born 1999), Venezuelan baseball player
- Luis Oviedo (volleyball) (born 1957), Cuban volleyball player
- Nahuel Oviedo (born 1990), Argentine footballer
- Papi Oviedo (1938–2017), Cuban musician

== Other uses ==
- Oviedo, Dominican Republic, a city in the Dominican Republic
- Oviedo, Florida, a city in the United States
- Real Oviedo, a football club
- Sudarium of Oviedo ("Shroud of Oviedo"), a religious relic kept in the Spanish city
