= 5th federal electoral district of Guanajuato =

Federal electoral district of Mexico

Guanajuato's 5th
- Electoral district of the Chamber of Deputies of Mexico

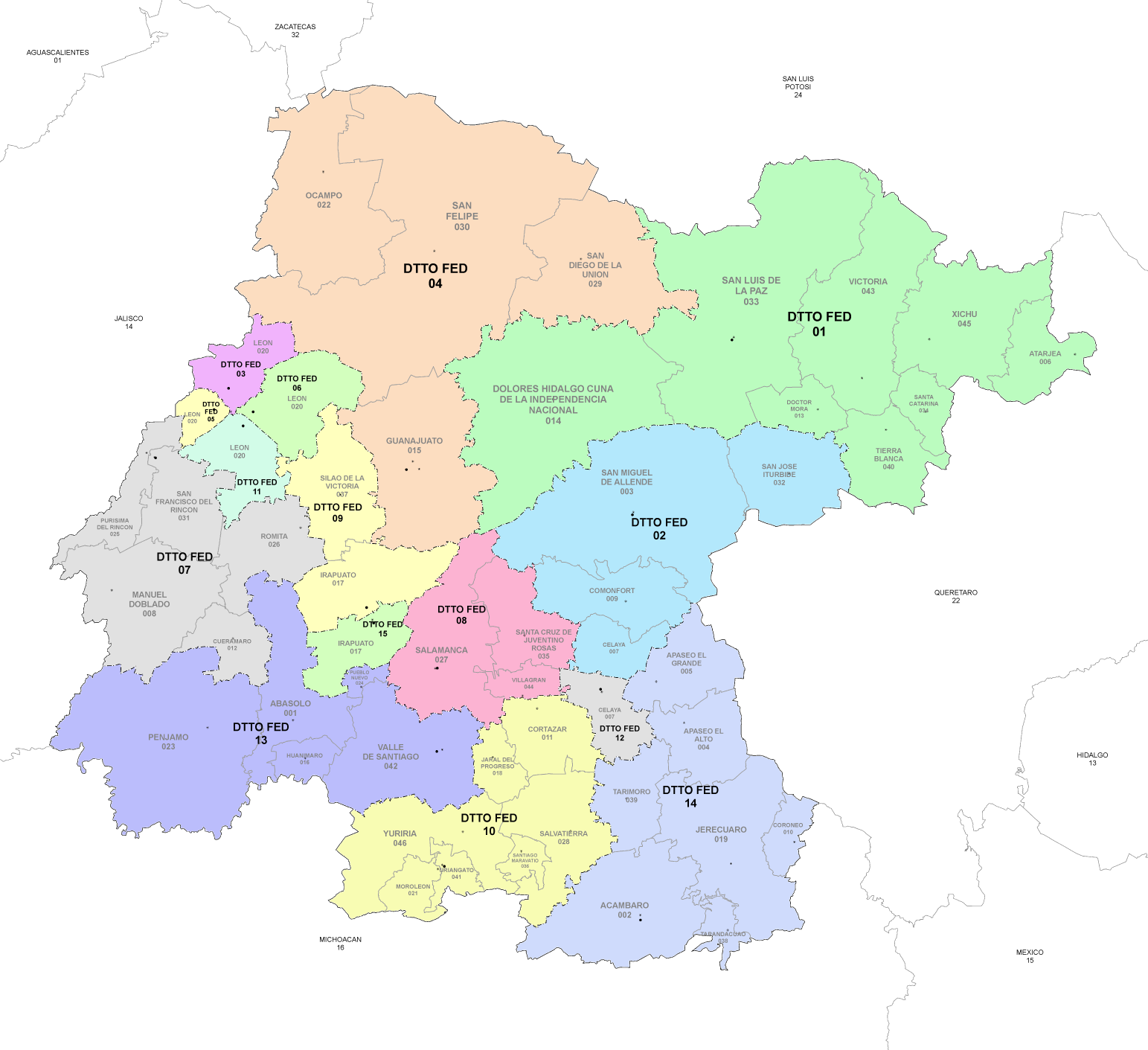
- 5th district since 2023

Incumbent
- Member: Éctor Jaime Ramírez
- Party: ▌National Action Party
- Congress: 66th (2024–2027)

District
- State: Guanajuato
- Head town: León de Los Aldama
- Coordinates: 21°07′N 101°41′W
- Covers: Municipality of León (part)
- PR region: Second
- Precincts: 180
- Population: 430,386 (2020 census)

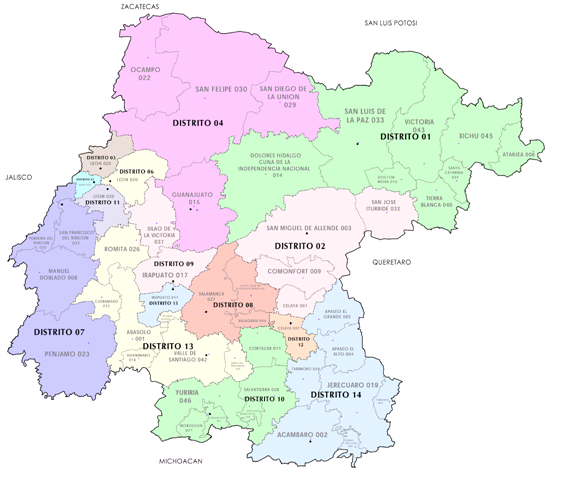
Guanajuato's districts in 2017–2022

The 5th federal electoral district of Guanajuato (Spanish: Distrito electoral federal 05 de Guanajuato) is one of the 300 electoral districts into which Mexico is divided for elections to the federal Chamber of Deputies and one of 15 such districts in the state of Guanajuato.

It elects one deputy to the lower house of Congress for each three-year legislative session by means of the first-past-the-post system. Votes cast in the district also count towards the calculation of proportional representation ("plurinominal") deputies elected from the second region.

The current member for the district, re-elected in the 2024 general election, is Éctor Jaime Ramírez Barba of the National Action Party (PAN).

== District territory ==
Under the 2023 districting plan adopted by the National Electoral Institute (INE), which is to be used for the 2024, 2027 and 2030 federal elections, Guanajuato's 5th district covers 180 electoral precincts (secciones electorales) across the western portion of the municipality of León. (Note: The 3rd, 6th and 11th districts cover the remainder of the municipality.)

The head town (cabecera distrital), where results from individual polling stations are gathered together and tallied, is the city of León. The district reported a population of 430,386 in the 2020 census.

== Previous districting schemes ==
Evolution of electoral district numbers
	1974	1978	1996	2005	2017	2023
Guanajuato	9	13	15	14	15	15
Chamber of Deputies	196	300				

2017–2022

Between 2017 and 2022, the 5th district's head town was at León and it covered 205 precincts in the west of the municipality.

2005–2017

Under the 2005 plan, Guanajuato had only 14 districts. This district's head town was at León and it covered 204 precincts in the north-west of the municipality.

1996–2005

In the 1996 scheme, under which Guanajuato was assigned 15 seats, the district had its head town at León and it comprised 197 precincts in the west of the municipality.

1978–1996

The districting scheme in force from 1978 to 1996 was the result of the 1977 electoral reforms, which increased the number of single-member seats in the Chamber of Deputies from 196 to 300. Under that plan, Guanajuato's seat allocation rose from 9 to 13. The 5th district's head town was at Pénjamo and it covered five municipalities:
- Manuel Doblado, Cuerámaro, Pénjamo, Purísima del Rincón and San Francisco del Rincón.

== Deputies returned to Congress ==
(Mexico) National parties
- Current
- PAN
- PRI
- PT
- PVEM
- MC
- Morena
- PAZ
- Somos
- Defunct or local only
- PLM
- PNR
- PRM
- PNM
- PP
- PPS
- PARM
- PFCRN
- CON
- PANAL
- PSD
- PES
- PES
- PRD

Guanajuato's 5th district
Election	Deputy	Party	Term	Legislature
1916	David Peñaflor		1916–1917	Constituent Congress of Querétaro
...
1964	Vicente Salgado Páez	Institutional Revolutionary Party	1964–1967	46th Congress
1967	Ignacio Vázquez Torres	Institutional Revolutionary Party	1967–1970	47th Congress
1970	Bonifacio Ibarra Morales	Institutional Revolutionary Party	1970–1973	48th Congress
1973	José Luis Estrada Delgadillo	Institutional Revolutionary Party	1973–1976	49th Congress
1976	Aurelio Garcia Sierra	Institutional Revolutionary Party	1976–1979	50th Congress
1979	Jorge Martínez Domínguez	Institutional Revolutionary Party	1979–1982	51st Congress
1982	Rubén García Farías	Institutional Revolutionary Party	1982–1985	52nd Congress
1985	Eliseo Rodríguez Ramírez	Institutional Revolutionary Party	1985–1988	53rd Congress
1988	Rubén García Farías	Institutional Revolutionary Party	1988–1991	54th Congress
1991	Juvenal Medel Ledezma	Institutional Revolutionary Party	1991–1994	55th Congress
1994	Pascual Ramírez Córdova	Institutional Revolutionary Party	1994–1997	56th Congress
1997	Ricardo Arturo Ontiveros y Romo	National Action Party (Mexico)	1997–2000	57th Congress
2000	Miguel Gutiérrez Hernández	National Action Party (Mexico)	2000–2003	58th Congress
2003	Mario Ernesto Dávila Aranda	National Action Party (Mexico)	2003–2006	59th Congress
2006	Éctor Jaime Ramírez Barba	National Action Party (Mexico)	2006–2009	60th Congress
2009	Lucila del Carmen Gallegos Camarena	National Action Party (Mexico)	2009–2012	61st Congress
2012	Diego Sinhué Rodríguez Vallejo (Note: Rodríguez Vallejo resigned his seat on 15 February 2015 and was replaced for the remainder of his term by his alternate, Espino Cano.); Viridiana Lizette Espino Cano	National Action Party (Mexico)	2012–2015	62nd Congress
2015	Alejandra Noemí Reynoso Sánchez	National Action Party (Mexico)	2015–2018	63rd Congress
2018	Éctor Jaime Ramírez Barba	National Action Party (Mexico)	2018–2021	64th Congress
2021	Éctor Jaime Ramírez Barba	National Action Party (Mexico)	2021–2024	65th Congress
2024	Éctor Jaime Ramírez Barba	National Action Party (Mexico)	2024–2027	66th Congress

== Presidential elections ==
Guanajuato's 5th district
Election	District won by	Party or coalition	%
2018	Ricardo Anaya Cortés	Por México al Frente	52.4503
2024	Bertha Xóchitl Gálvez Ruiz	Fuerza y Corazón por México	48.1595
