= Fernando Torres Graciano =

Mexican politician (born 1970)

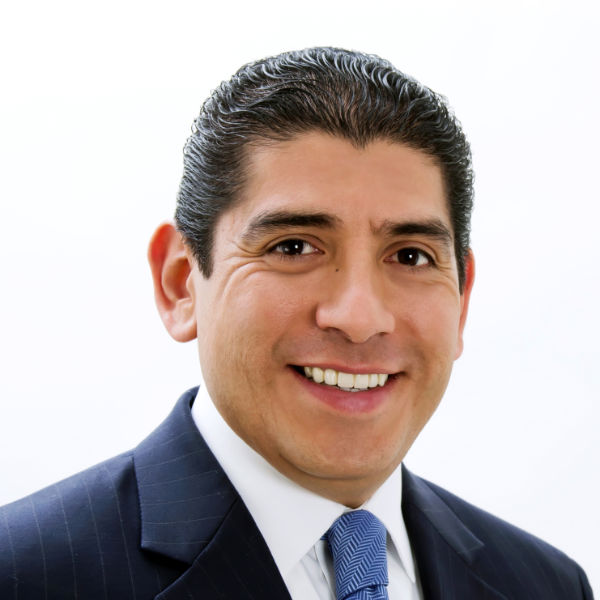

Senator for Guanajuato
- In office 1 September 2012 – 31 August 2018
- Preceded by: Humberto Andrade Quezada
- Succeeded by: Alejandra Reynoso Sánchez

Personal details
- Born: 27 August 1970 (age 55) León, Guanajuato, Mexico
- Party: PAN
- Occupation: Politician

Fernando Torres Graciano (born 27 August 1970) is a Mexican politician affiliated with the National Action Party (PAN).

Torres Graciano was born in León, Guanajuato. He earned a law degree from the Universidad del Bajío (1994).

From 2003 to 2006, he was a local deputy in the Congress of Guanajuato. In the 2012 general election, he was elected to the Senate for the state of Guanajuato, where he served during the 62nd and 63rd sessions of Congress.

Torres Graciano has since been elected to three terms in the Chamber of Deputies: in 2018, as a plurinominal deputy for the 2nd region; and in 2021, re-elected in 2024, for Guanajuato's 3rd congressional district.
