= Carla Rochín Nieto =

Mexican politician (born 1966)

- Born: 4 July 1966 (age 60); Guanajuato, Mexico
- Education: Universidad de Guanajuato
- Occupation: Politician
- Political party: PAN

Carla Rochín Nieto (born 4 July 1966) is a Mexican politician affiliated with the National Action Party (PAN).

In the 2003 mid-terms, she was elected to the Chamber of Deputies to represent Guanajuato's 8th district during the 58th session of Congress.

In November 2020, she was indicted for her responsibility in the June 2009 ABC daycare centre fire in Hermosillo, Sonora, in which 49 infants were killed.
