= Antonio Vega Corona =

Mexican politician (born 1965)

- Born: 30 June 1965 (age 60); Guanajuato, Mexico
- Occupation: Politician
- Political party: PAN

Antonio Vega Corona (born 30 June 1965) is a Mexican politician affiliated with the National Action Party (PAN). In the 2006 general election, he was elected to the Chamber of Deputies to represent Guanajuato's 8th district during the 60th session of Congress.
