= Juan Alcocer Flores =

Mexican politician (born 1955)

- Born: 10 January 1955 (age 71); Salamanca, Guanajuato, Mexico
- Occupation: Politician
- Political party: PAN

Juan Alcocer Flores (born 10 January 1955) is a Mexican politician from the National Action Party (PAN). In the 2000 general election, he was elected to the Chamber of Deputies to represent Guanajuato's 8th district during the 58th session of Congress.
