= Genaro Carreño Muro =

Mexican politician (born 1958)

- Born: 27 July 1958 (age 67); Salamanca, Guanajuato, Mexico
- Occupation: Politician
- Political party: PAN

Genaro Carreño Muro (born 27 September 1958) is a Mexican politician affiliated with the National Action Party (PAN). In the 2012 general election, he was elected to the Chamber of Deputies to represent Guanajuato's 8th district during the 62nd session of Congress.
