= Elizabeth Vargas Martín =

Mexican politician

- Born: 21 May 1957 (age 69); León, Guanajuato, Mexico
- Occupation: Politician
- Political party: PAN

Elizabeth Vargas Martín del Campo (born 21 May 1957) is a Mexican politician affiliated with the National Action Party (PAN). In the 2012 general election, she was elected to the Chamber of Deputies to represent Guanajuato's 3rd district during the 62nd session of Congress.
