= Mario Ernesto Dávila Aranda =

Mexican politician

- Born: 16 January 1959 (age 67); León, Guanajuato, Mexico
- Occupations: Veterinarian and politician
- Political party: PAN

Mario Ernesto de San Alberto Magno Dávila Aranda (born 16 January 1959) is a Mexican veterinarian and politician affiliated with the National Action Party (PAN). In the 2003 mid-terms, he was elected to the Chamber of Deputies to represent Guanajuato's 5th district during the 59th session of Congress.
