= Lucila Gallegos Camarena =

Mexican politician

- Born: 31 October 1961 (age 64); León, Guanajuato, Mexico
- Occupation: Politician
- Political party: PAN

Lucila del Carmen Gallegos Camarena (born 31 October 1961) is a Mexican politician from the National Action Party (PAN). In the 2009 mid-terms, she was elected to the Chamber of Deputies to represent Guanajuato's 5th district during the 61st session of Congress.
