= José Guadalupe Vera Hernández =

Mexican politician

- Born: 9 November 1959 (age 66); León, Guanajuato, Mexico
- Occupation: Politician
- Political party: PAN

José Guadalupe Vera Hernández (born 9 November 1959) is a Mexican politician from the National Action Party (PAN). In the 2009 mid-terms, he was elected to the Chamber of Deputies to represent Guanajuato's 3rd district during the 61st session of Congress.
