= Consuelo Camarena =

Mexican politician (born 1943)

- Born: 27 April 1943 (age 83); Guanajuato, Mexico
- Occupation: Politician
- Political party: PAN

Consuelo Camarena Gómez (Note: In this Mexican name, the surname is Camarena and the second or maternal family name is Gómez.) (born 27 April 1943) is a Mexican politician affiliated with the National Action Party (PAN).

She was a member of the Congress of Guanajuato from 1994 to 1997 and, in the 2003 mid-terms, she was elected to the Chamber of Deputies to represent Guanajuato's 9th district during the 59th session of Congress.
