= Jaime Oliva Ramírez =

Mexican politician

- Born: 19 November 1958 (age 67); León, Guanajuato, Mexico
- Occupation: Politician
- Political party: PAN

Jaime Oliva Ramírez (born 19 November 1958) is a Mexican politician from the National Action Party (PAN). In the 2009 mid-terms, he was elected to the Chamber of Deputies to represent Guanajuato's 6th district during the 61st session of Congress.
