= Rosa Elba Pérez =

Mexican politician

- Born: 30 September 1968 (age 57); León, Guanajuato, Mexico
- Occupation: Politician
- Political party: PVEM
- Website: http://www.rosaelbaperez.com/

Rosa Elba Pérez Hernández (born 30 September 1968) is a Mexican politician affiliated with the Ecologist Green Party of Mexico (PVEM). In the 2012 general election, she was elected to the Chamber of Deputies to represent Guanajuato's 6th district during the 62nd session of Congress.
