= Jorge Carlos Obregón =

Mexican politician (born 1956)

- Born: 9 April 1956 (age 70); León, Guanajuato, Mexico
- Education: Universidad de Guanajuato
- Occupation: Politician
- Political party: PAN

Jorge Carlos Obregón Serrano (born 9 April 1956) is a Mexican politician affiliated with the National Action Party (PAN).

He served as municipal president of León, Guanajuato, from 1998 to 2000. In the 2003 mid-terms, he was elected to the Chamber of Deputies to represent Guanajuato's 3rd district during the 59th session of Congress.

Preceded by Luis M. Quiros Echegaray	Municipal President of León, Guanajuato; 1997–2000	Succeeded by Luis Ernesto Ayala
