= Alejandra Reynoso Sánchez =

Mexican politician (born 1975)

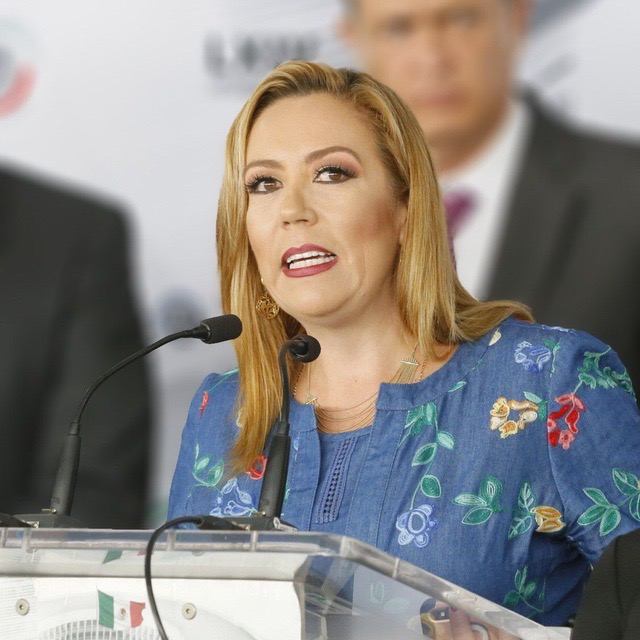
- Reynoso Sánchez in 2020

Senator for Guanajuato
- In office 1 September 2018 – 31 August 2024 Serving with Erandi Bermúdez Méndez and Martha Lucía Mícher Camarena
- Preceded by: Fernando Torres Graciano

Personal details
- Born: 21 April 1975 (age 51) León, Guanajuato, Mexico
- Party: PAN
- Occupation: Politician

Alejandra Noemí Reynoso Sánchez (born 21 April 1975) is a Mexican politician from the National Action Party (PAN). She is a native of León, Guanajuato.

From 2009 to 2011 she served as a plurinominal deputy in the 61st Congress, representing the second region, which includes her home state of Guanajuato. She returned to the lower house in the 2015 mid-terms, to represent Guanajuato's 5th district during the 63rd Congress.

In the 2018 general election, she was elected to the Senate for the state of Guanajuato to serve during the 64th and 65th Congresses.
