= List of municipal presidents of León, Guanajuato =

This is a list of municipal presidents of the Mexican city of León, Guanajuato.

== List of officials ==
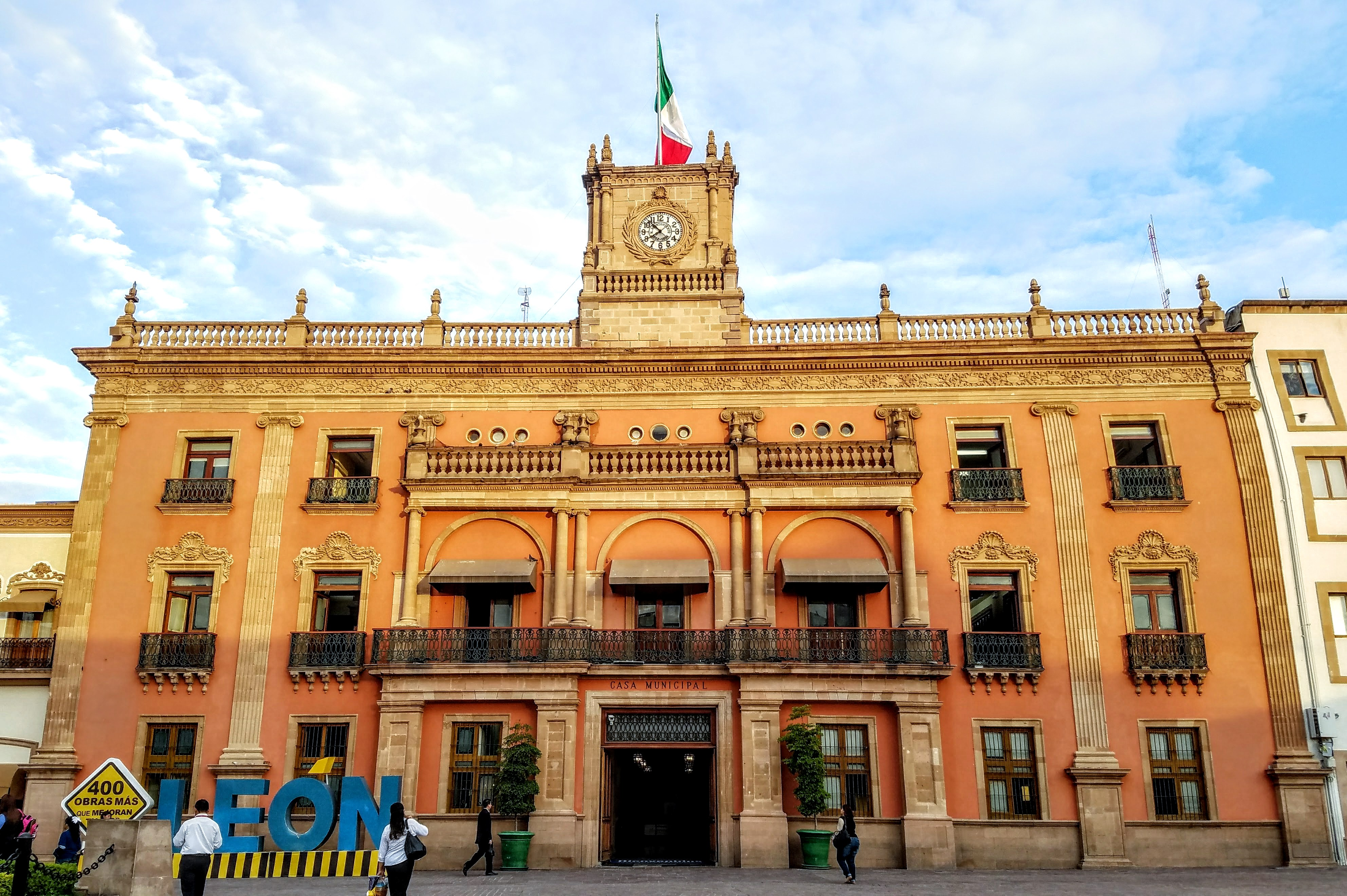
Palacio Municipal, León (photo 2017)

- Lorenzo Rodríguez Garza, 1967–1969
- Arturo Valdéz Sánchez, 1970–1972
- Sergio Cano Meléndez, 1973
- José Arturo Lozano Madrazo, 1974–1976
- Roberto Plascencia Saldaña, 1977–1979
- Harold Gabriel Appelt, 1980–1982
- Rodolfo Padilla Padilla, 1982–1984
- Antonio Torres Gómez, 1984–1985
- Antonio Hernández Ornelas, 1986–1987
- Arturo Villegas Torres, 1987–1988
- Carlos Medina Plascencia, 1988–1991
- Facundo Castro Chávez, 1991
- Eliseo Martínez Pérez, 1992–1994
- Luis Manuel Quirós Echegaray, 1995–1997
- Jorge Carlos Obregón Serrano, 1998–2000
- Luis Ernesto Ayala Torres, 2000–2003, 2018
- Ricardo Alaniz Posada, 2003–2006
- Vicente Guerrero Reynoso, 2006–2009
- Francisco Ricardo Sheffield Padilla, 2009–2012
- Bárbara Botello Santibáñez, 2012–2015
- Octavio Augusto Villasana Delfín, 2012–2015
- Héctor López Santillana, 2015–2021
- Alejandra Gutiérrez Campos, 2021-

== See also ==
- León Municipality
- Timeline of León, Mexico
