= Adriana Rodríguez Vizcarra =

Mexican politician

- Born: 22 December 1949 (age 76); Mexico City, Mexico
- Occupation: Politician
- Political party: PAN

Adriana Rodríguez Vizcarra Velázquez (born 22 December 1949) is a Mexican politician affiliated with the National Action Party (PAN).

In the 2006 general election, she was elected to the Chamber of Deputies to represent Guanajuato's 6th district during the 60th session of Congress.

She unsuccessfully sought election as one of Guanajuato's senators in the 2024 Senate election, occupying the second place on the National Action Party's two-name formula.
