= Joel Vilches Mares =

Mexican politician

- Born: 13 July 1957 (age 68); León, Guanajuato, Mexico
- Occupation: Politician
- Political party: PAN

Joel Vilches Mares (born 13 July 1957) is a Mexican politician from the National Action Party (PAN). In the 2000 general election, he was elected to the Chamber of Deputies to represent Guanajuato's 6th district during the 58th session of Congress.
