= Salvador Márquez Lozornio =

Mexican politician

- Born: 24 December 1956 (age 69); Celaya, Guanajuato, Mexico
- Occupation: Politician
- Political party: PAN

Salvador Márquez Lozornio (born 24 December 1956) is a Mexican politician affiliated with the National Action Party (PAN). From 2000 to 2003 he sat as a local deputy in the Congress of Guanajuato and, in the 2003 mid-terms, he was elected to the Chamber of Deputies to represent Guanajuato's 6th district during the 59th session of Congress.
