= Justino Arriaga Rojas =

Mexican politician (born 1979)

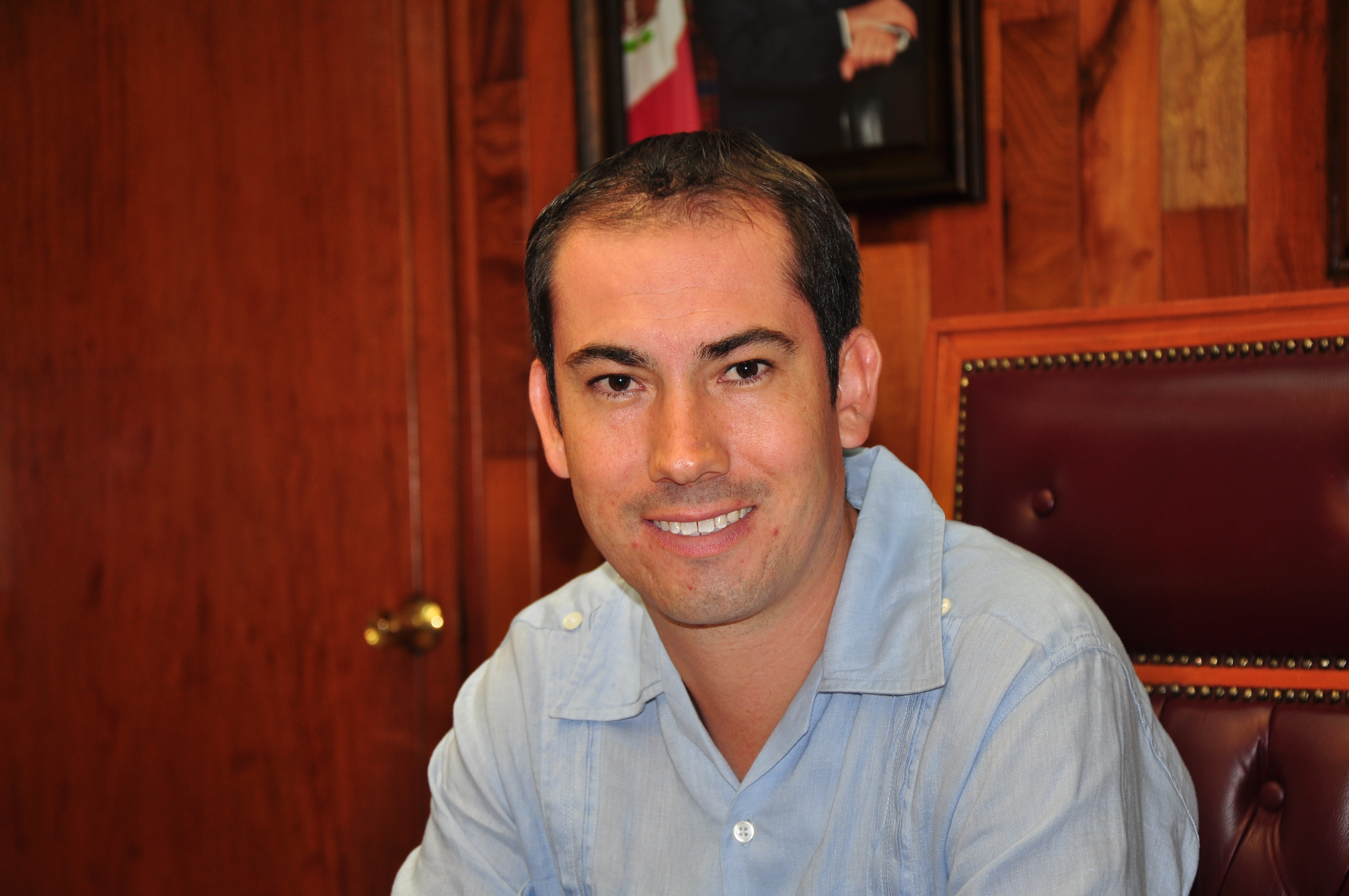
- Born: 20 September 1979 (age 46); Salamanca, Guanajuato, Mexico
- Occupation: Politician
- Political party: PAN, Morena

Justino Eugenio Arriaga Rojas (born 20 September 1979) is a Mexican politician. He has been affiliated with both the National Action Party (PAN) and the National Regeneration Movement (Morena).

He was the mayor of his hometown of Salamanca, Guanajuato, from 2012 to 2015. From 2009 to 2012, he served as a plurinominal deputy (2nd region) during the 61st session of Congress. He began his political career as municipal Secretary of Youth Action in the year 1999. He was also a SCAN trainer, State Counselor, and National Counselor as well.

== Education ==
Arriaga Rojas graduated with a law degree from Iberoamericana University. He has a master's degree in politics and public management from ITESO as well as a Master's in Public Administration from the ITESM (Tecnológico de Monterrey). He has a corporate law diploma from Iberoamericana University and a diploma in leadership and management from Harvard University.

== Political career ==
On 5 January 1999, he became a member of the National Action Party (PAN). He served as a Youth Action Secretary, a State Counselor, and a National Counselor. Rojas was elected as a plurinominal deputy (2009–2012). He was chosen by his party as a candidate for Mayor of Salamanca for 2012–2015. He is member of the CDE of the National Action Party (PAN) in Guanajuato. He is currently President of Municipal Directive Committee of PAN Salamanca.

== Career ==
Rojas has served as a trial lawyer for EMCA Company and Special Agricultural Projects Coordinator in the Secretaria de la Reforma Agraria (Secretary of Agrarian Reform).

He served also as a tax lawyer in the SAT (Tax Service Administration). During the LXI Legislature (2009–2012), he was a federal congressman and a member of the Constitutional Points Commission, Agrarian Reform Commission, Climate Change Special Commission, Friendship Group between Mexico and South Korea (President), Mexico and Czech Republic Member. He was also part of the Latin American Parliament, Citizen Security Commission, Prevention and Combat of Drug Trafficking, Terrorism and Organized Crime.

He served as elected mayor of Salamanca, Guanajuato, during the period from 2012 to 2015. Currently he is the CEAMEG director (Center of The Studies of the Advancement of Woman and Gender Equity).

He returned to the Chamber of Deputies in the 2018 general election, representing Guanajuato's 8th district for the PAN. He was re-elected for the same seat in the 2021 mid-terms; originally a part of the PAN caucus in Congress, he switched allegiance to Morena on 2 February 2023.
