= María Concepción Navarrete =

Mexican politician (born 1959)

- Born: 5 July 1959 (age 66); Guanajuato, Mexico
- Occupation: Politician
- Political party: PRI

María Concepción Navarrete Vital (born 5 July 1959) is a Mexican politician affiliated with the Institutional Revolutionary Party (PRI). In the 2012 general election, she was elected to the Chamber of Deputies to represent Guanajuato's 11th district during the 62nd session of Congress.
