= Ramón Landeros González =

Mexican politician

- Born: 6 April 1963 (age 63); Guanajuato, Mexico
- Occupation: Politician
- Political party: PAN

Ramón Landeros González (born 6 April 1963) is a Mexican politician affiliated with the National Action Party (PAN). In the 2006 general election, he was elected to the Chamber of Deputies to represent Guanajuato's 11th district during the 60th session of Congress (Mexico).
