= 8th federal electoral district of Guanajuato =

Federal electoral district of Mexico

Guanajuato's 8th
- Electoral district of the Chamber of Deputies of Mexico

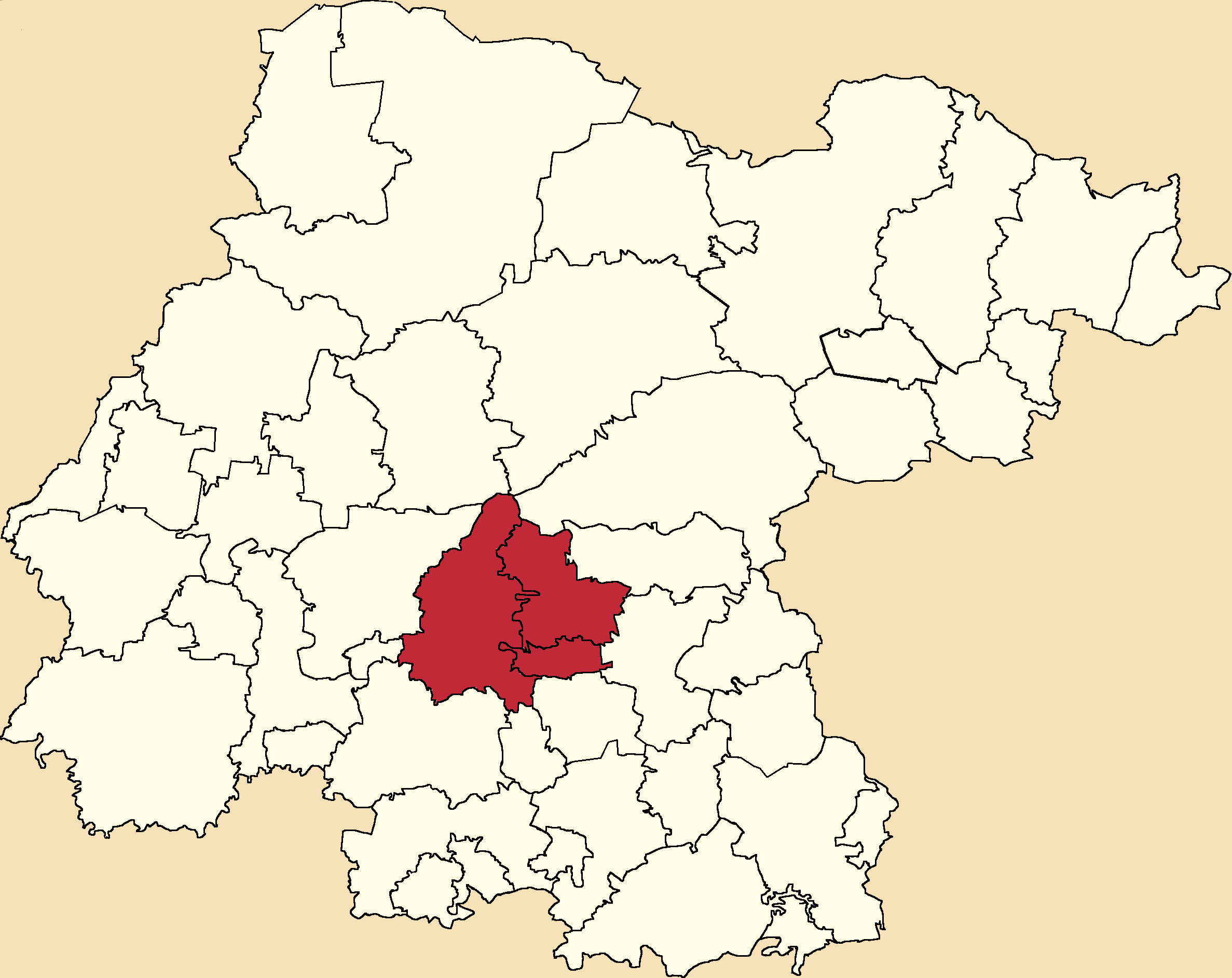
- 8th district since 2017

Incumbent
- Member: Ernesto Prieto Gallardo
- Party: ▌Morena
- Congress: 66th (2024–2027)

District
- State: Guanajuato
- Head town: Salamanca
- Coordinates: 20°34′N 101°12′W
- Covers: 3 municipalities: Salamanca, Santa Cruz de Juventino Rosas, Villagrán
- PR region: Second
- Precincts: 220
- Population: 422,317 (2020 census)

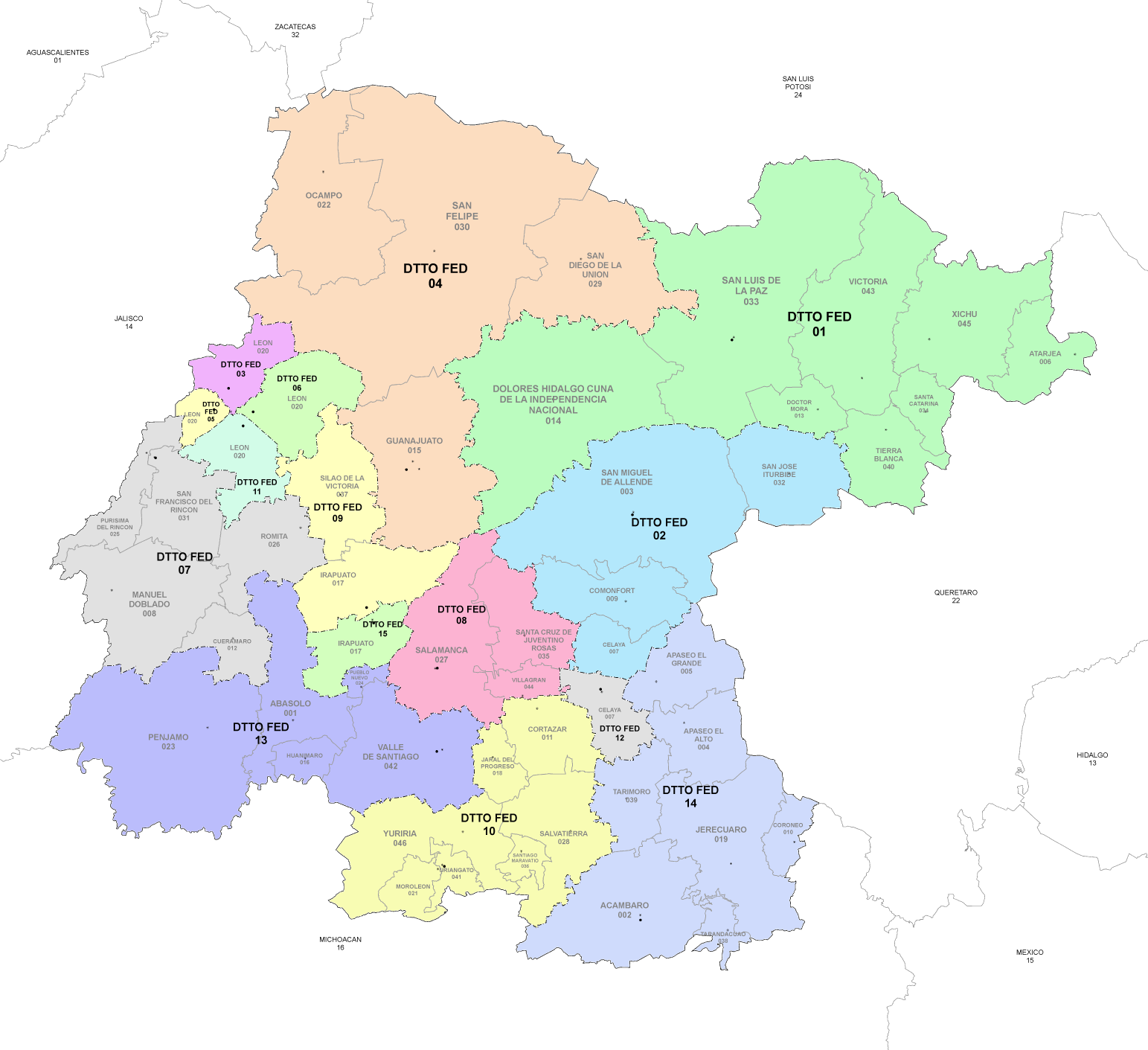
2023 districting scheme for Guanajuato

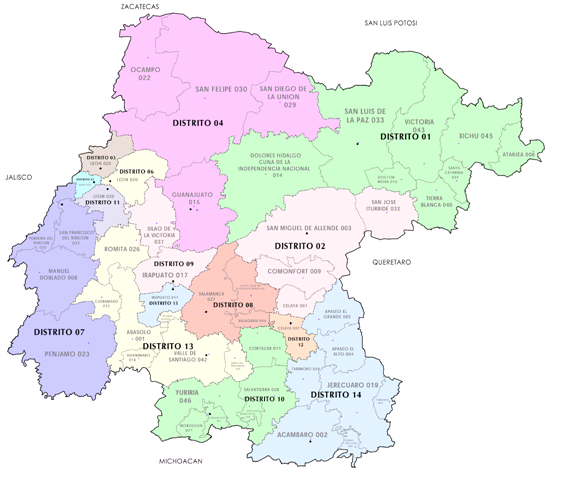
Guanajuato's districts in 2017–2022

The 8th federal electoral district of Guanajuato (Spanish: Distrito electoral federal 08 de Guanajuato) is one of the 300 electoral districts into which Mexico is divided for elections to the federal Chamber of Deputies and one of 15 such districts in the state of Guanajuato.

It elects one deputy to the lower house of Congress for each three-year legislative session by means of the first-past-the-post system. Votes cast in the district also count towards the calculation of proportional representation ("plurinominal") deputies elected from the second region.

The current member for the district, elected in the 2024 general election, is Ernesto Alejandro Prieto Gallardo of the National Regeneration Movement (Morena).

== District territory ==
Under the 2023 districting plan adopted by the National Electoral Institute (INE), which is to be used for the 2024, 2027 and 2030 federal elections, the 8th district covers central Guanajuato and comprises 220 electoral precincts (secciones electorales) across three of the state's 46 municipalities:

- Salamanca, Santa Cruz de Juventino Rosas and Villagrán

The head town (cabecera distrital), where results from individual polling stations are gathered together and tallied, is the city of Salamanca. The district reported a population of 422,317 in the 2020 census.

== Previous districting schemes ==
Evolution of electoral district numbers
	1974	1978	1996	2005	2017	2023
Guanajuato	9	13	15	14	15	15
Chamber of Deputies	196	300				

2017–2022

Between 2017 and 2022, the 8th district had the same configuration as in the 2023 districting scheme.

2005–2017

Under the 2005 plan, Guanajuato had only 14 districts. This district's head town was at Salamanca and it covered four municipalities:
- Salamanca, Santa Cruz de Juventino Rosas and Villagrán, as in the later plans, plus Pueblo Nuevo.

1996–2005

In the 1996 scheme, under which Guanajuato was assigned 15 seats, the district had the same configuration as in the 2005 plan.

1978–1996

The districting scheme in force from 1978 to 1996 was the result of the 1977 electoral reforms, which increased the number of single-member seats in the Chamber of Deputies from 196 to 300. Under that plan, Guanajuato's seat allocation rose from 9 to 13. The 8th district was in the east of the state and it covered the municipalities of Celaya (which served as the head town) and Comonfort.

== Deputies returned to Congress ==
(Mexico) National parties
- Current
- PAN
- PRI
- PT
- PVEM
- MC
- Morena
- PAZ
- Somos
- Defunct or local only
- PLM
- PNR
- PRM
- PNM
- PP
- PPS
- PARM
- PFCRN
- CON
- PANAL
- PSD
- PES
- PES
- PRD

Guanajuato's 8th district
Election	Deputy	Party	Term	Legislature
1916	Hilario Medina		1916–1917	Constituent Congress of Querétaro
...
1970	Roberto Suárez Nieto	Institutional Revolutionary Party	1970–1973	48th Congress
1973	Ignacio Vázquez Torres	Institutional Revolutionary Party	1973–1976	49th Congress
1976	Graciela Meave Torrescano	Institutional Revolutionary Party	1976–1979	50th Congress
1979	Ofelia Ruiz Vega	Institutional Revolutionary Party	1979–1982	51st Congress
1982	Luis Dantón Rodríguez	Institutional Revolutionary Party	1982–1985	52nd Congress
1985	Jaime Martínez Jasso	Institutional Revolutionary Party	1985–1988	53rd Congress
1988	José Manuel Mendoza Márquez	National Action Party (Mexico)	1988–1991	54th Congress
1991	Mauricio Wolnitzer Clark y Ovadía	Institutional Revolutionary Party	1991–1994	55th Congress
1994	Josefina Balleza Sánchez	Institutional Revolutionary Party	1994–1997	56th Congress
1997	Rogelio Chabolla García (Note: Originally elected for the PAN, Chabolla García declared himself an independent on 26 August 1998. He resigned his seat on 3 September 1998 and was replaced for the remainder of his term by his alternate, Salazar Rojas.); Sergio Rosario Salazar Rojas	National Action Party (Mexico) Independent politician	1997–1998; 1998–2000	57th Congress
2000	Juan Alcocer Flores	National Action Party (Mexico)	2000–2003	58th Congress
2003	Carla Rochín Nieto	National Action Party (Mexico)	2003–2006	59th Congress
2006	Antonio Vega Corona	National Action Party (Mexico)	2006–2009	60th Congress
2009	Tomás Gutiérrez Ramírez	National Action Party (Mexico)	2009–2012	61st Congress
2012	Genaro Carreño Muro	National Action Party (Mexico)	2012–2015	62nd Congress
2015	Karina Padilla Ávila	National Action Party (Mexico)	2015–2018	63rd Congress
2018	Justino Eugenio Arriaga Rojas	National Action Party (Mexico)	2018–2021	64th Congress
2021	Justino Eugenio Arriaga Rojas (Note: Originally elected for the PAN, Arriaga Rojas switched allegiance to Morena on 2 February 2023.)	National Action Party (Mexico) National Regeneration Movement	2021–2024	65th Congress
2024	Ernesto Alejandro Prieto Gallardo	National Regeneration Movement	2024–2027	66th Congress

== Presidential elections ==
Guanajuato's 8th district
Election	District won by	Party or coalition	%
2018	Andrés Manuel López Obrador	Juntos Haremos Historia	41.1395
2024	Claudia Sheinbaum Pardo	Sigamos Haciendo Historia	56.9641
