= Juan Carlos Romero Hicks =

Mexican politician (born 1955)

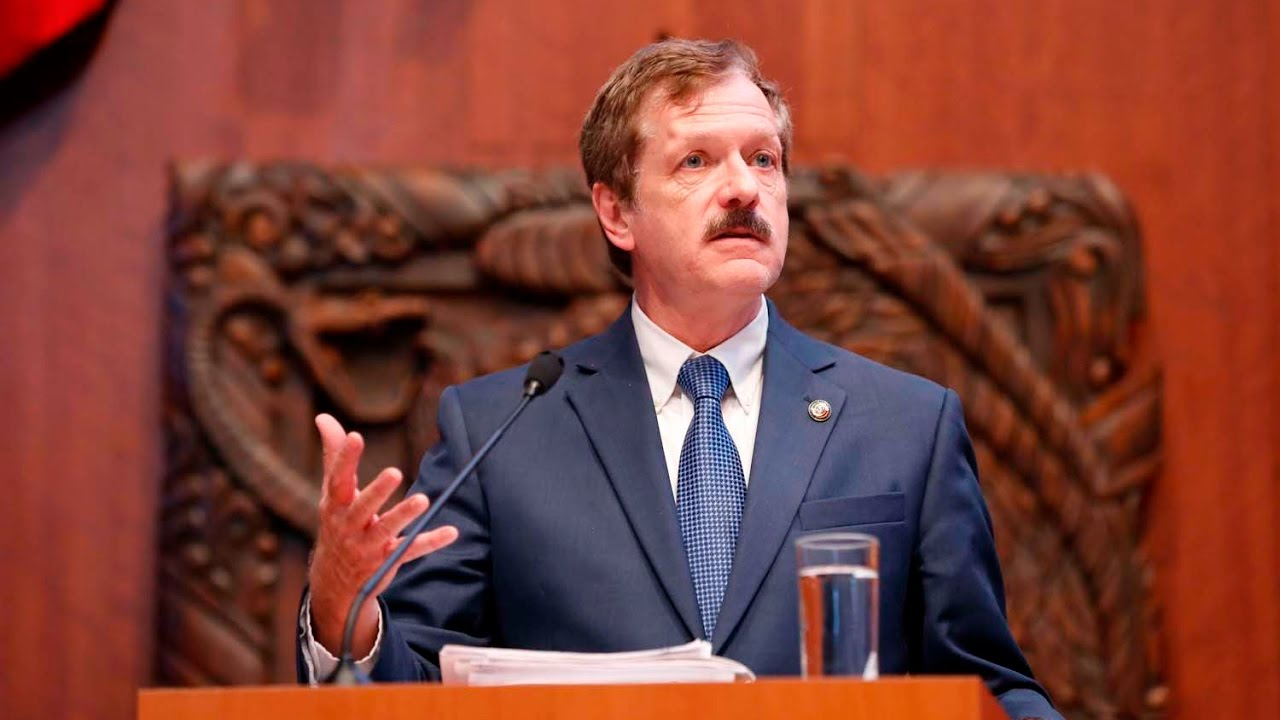
Juan Carlos Romero Hicks

Juan Carlos Romero Hicks (Note: In this Spanish name, the first or paternal surname is Romero and the second or maternal family name is Hicks.) (born 10 December 1955) is a Mexican politician and elected official, member of the National Action Party (PAN), and a Federal Senator since 29 August 2012. He was the director general of the National Science and Technology Council (CONACyT) from 2006 to 2011. He served as governor of Guanajuato from 2000 to 2006. From 1991 to 1999 he served as chancellor of the University of Guanajuato.

== Education ==
Romero was born in Guanajuato, Guanajuato. He holds a bachelor's degree in industrial relations from the University of Guanajuato and two master's degrees from Southern Oregon University in business administration and social sciences. Most of his early professional life was dedicated to academia as a professor in the University of Guanajuato of which he became a chancellor from 1991 to 1999 under Governor Carlos Medina Plascencia.

On 21 May 1994, during his term as chancellor, the University of Guanajuato became autonomous. He also participated in an important number of academic organizations and institutions including the presidency of the Inter-American Organization for Higher Education and the Consortium for North American Higher Education Collaboration.

== Political career ==
He joined the National Action Party in 1999 and in 2000 he became governor of Guanajuato, his native state, defeating Juan Ignacio Torres Landa of the PRI.

On 7 December 2006, he was appointed by President Felipe Calderón Hinojosa as director general of the National Science and Technology Council, where he served until March 2011.

He served in the Senate for Guanajuato during the 62nd and 63rd sessions of Congress (2012–2018), where he was the president of the Education Commission, secretary of the Science and Technology Commission and the North American Foreign Affairs Commission, and a member of the Foreign Affairs Commission.

Mexico's major Constitutional Reform on Education was passed under his presidency of the Senate Education Commission in December 2011. He has also been an advocate on behalf of migrants and their humanitarian assistance.

In the 2018 general election, he was elected to the Chamber of Deputies to represent Guanajuato's 4th district during the 64th session of Congress and, in the 2021 mid-terms, he was re-elected to the same seat for the 65th session.

== See also ==
- CONACYT

Preceded by Ramón Martín Huerta	Governor of Guanajuato; 2000–2006	Succeeded by Juan Manuel Oliva Ramírez
