= Ignacio Vázquez Torres =

Mexican politician (1939–2023)

Senator for Guanajuato
- In office 1994–2000

Borough chief of Cuauhtémoc, D.F.
- In office 1988–1990

Federal deputy for Guanajuato's 7th
- In office 1979–1982

Federal deputy for Guanajuato's 8th
- In office 1973–1976

Federal deputy for Guanajuato's 5th
- In office 1967–1970

Personal details
- Born: 13 August 1939 Pénjamo, Guanajuato, Mexico
- Died: 21 September 2023 (aged 84)
- Party: PRI (until 2006)
- Spouse: Irma Lucía Chavolla Hernández
- Education: UNAM
- Occupation: Lawyer, politician
- Known for: 1995 Guanajuato gubernatorial election
- Nickname: Nacho

Ignacio Vázquez Torres (Note: In this Spanish name, the first or paternal surname is Vázquez and the second or maternal family name is Torres.) (13 August 1939 – 21 September 2023) was a Mexican lawyer and politician. A long-time member of the Institutional Revolutionary Party (PRI) – which he represented in both chambers of Congress and for which he fought and lost the 1995 gubernatorial election in Guanajuato – he resigned from the party in 2006.

== Biography ==
Ignacio Vázquez Torres was born in Pénjamo, Guanajuato, on 13 August 1939. He graduated with a law degree from the National Autonomous University of Mexico (UNAM) and joined the Institutional Revolutionary Party in 1958.

He was elected to the Chamber of Deputies on three occasions: in the 1967 mid-terms (47th Congress), for Guanajuato's 5th district; in the 1973 mid-terms (49th Congress), for Guanajuato's 8th district; and in the 1979 mid-terms (51st Congress), for Guanajuato's 7th district.

Politically close to Jesús Reyes Heroles, he held positions in the Secretariat of the Interior (SEGOB) and the Secretariat of Public Education (SEP) during Reyes Heroles's tenure in those departments during the presidencies of José López Portillo (1976–1982) and Miguel de la Madrid (1982–1988). From 1988 to 1990, he served as the borough chief of Cuauhtémoc in the Federal District.

In the 1994 general election, he was elected to the Senate for his home state of Guanajuato, where he served during the 56th and 57th Congresses. During his term, he took leave from his Senate seat to contend for the governorship of Guanajuato in the 28 May 1995 election. Representing the PRI in a five-horse race, he placed second behind Vicente Fox of the National Action Party (PAN): the first time the PRI had lost control of the state. Vázquez Torres returned to the Senate and served out the remainder of his term.

He resigned his 47-year membership in the PRI in 2006 over the party's support for the attempts made by Vicente Fox – who had been elected to the presidency at the end of his gubernatorial term – to lift the immunity from prosecution enjoyed by Andrés Manuel López Obrador, then serving as head of government of the Federal District.

Ignacio Vázquez Torres died on 21 September 2023 at the age of 84. The announcement was made by his niece, Antares Vázquez Alatorre, at the time a senator for Guanajuato from the National Regeneration Movement (Morena).
