= Ernesto Oviedo Oviedo =

Mexican politician

- Born: 6 July 1953 (age 72); Galeana, Nuevo León, Mexico
- Occupation: Politician
- Political party: PAN

Ernesto Oviedo Oviedo (born 6 July 1953) is a Mexican politician affiliated with the National Action Party (PAN). In the 2006 general election, he was elected to the Chamber of Deputies to represent Guanajuato's 3rd district during the 60th session of Congress.
