= Juan Manuel Oliva =

Mexican politician

Juan Manuel Oliva Ramírez
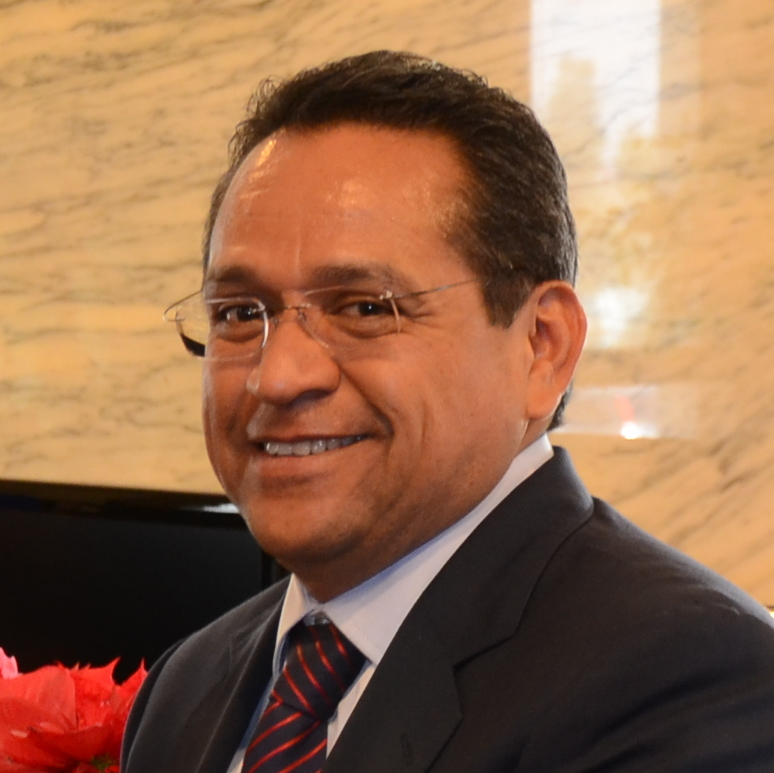

Governor of Guanajuato
- In office September 26, 2006 – March 29, 2012
- Preceded by: Juan Carlos Romero Hicks
- Succeeded by: Héctor López Santillana

Personal details
- Born: March 21, 1960 (age 66) León, Guanajuato
- Party: National Action Party
- Spouse: Martha Martínez Castro
- Profession: Journalist, politician

Juan Manuel Oliva Ramírez (born March 21, 1960 León, Guanajuato) is a Mexican politician affiliated with the National Action Party PAN who served as Governor of Guanajuato from 2006 to 2012.

Juan Manuel Oliva, a journalist who studied at the Escuela de Periodismo Carlos Septién García, initiated his professional career as a reporter for several newspapers of the region of the Bajío and other parts of the country.

Member of the PAN from 1989, has held diverse positions within the state structure, he has been state President of the National Action Party and has been civil employee of the Municipal Government of León. Oliva has served in the upper house of the Mexican Congress and served as general secretary of Governor Juan Carlos Romero.

== See also ==
- 2006 Guanajuato state election

Preceded by Juan Carlos Romero	Governor of Guanajuato; 2006 — 2012	Succeeded by Héctor López Santillana
