= Ricardo Alaníz Posada =

Mexican politician

- Born: 20 March 1937 (age 89); Mexico City, Mexico
- Occupations: Businessman and politician
- Political party: PAN

Ricardo Alaníz Posada (born 20 March 1937) is a Mexican businessman and politician affiliated with the National Action Party. As of 2014 he served as Senator of the LVIII Legislature of the Mexican Congress representing Guanajuato and as Municipal President of León, Guanajuato between 2003 and 2006.

== See also ==
- List of mayors of León, Mexico
