= Ricardo Sheffield =

American-born Mexican politician (born 1966)

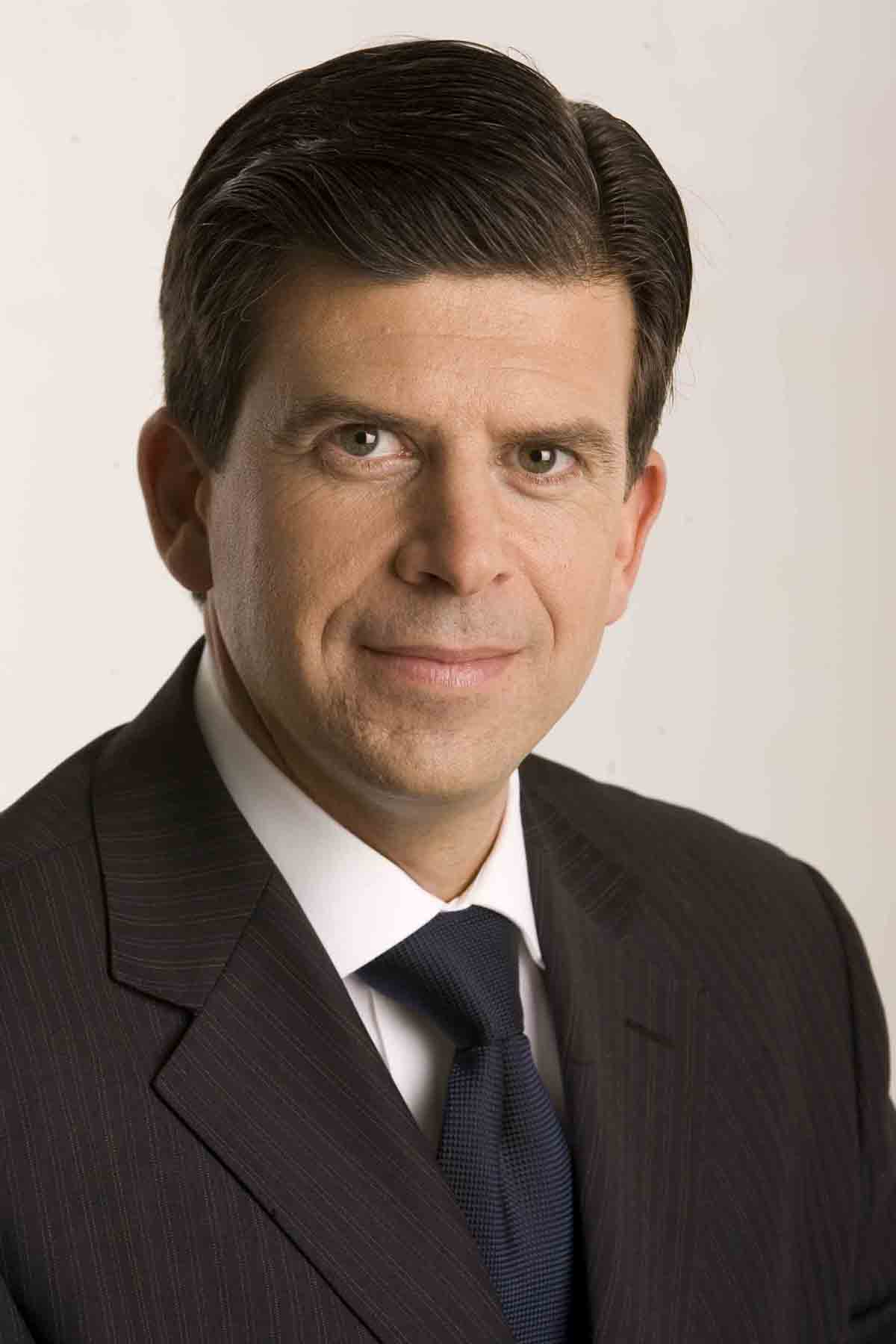
- Sheffield in 2008

Member of the Senate of the Republic
- Incumbent
- Assumed office 1 September 2024
- Constituency: Guanajuato (1st seat)

Personal details
- Born: Francisco Ricardo Sheffield; 30 October 1966 (age 59) Los Angeles, California, U.S.
- Citizenship: Mexico; United States
- Party: PAN (1993–2018); Morena (since 2018)

Francisco Ricardo Sheffield (born 30 October 1966) is an American-born Mexican politician. Previously a member of the National Action Party (PAN), he is currently affiliated with the National Regeneration Movement (Morena). In the 2024 general election, he was elected to a six-year term in the Senate for the state of Guanajuato.

== Early life and education ==
Ricardo Sheffield was born in Los Angeles, California to an American father and a Mexican mother. Grew up in León, Guanajuato, Mexico. A lawyer by profession, he holds a bachelor's degree from the Ibero-American University (1989), a master's from Harvard University (1991), and a doctorate from the Autonomous University of Nuevo León (2020).

== Career ==
He joined the PAN in 1993. From 1997 to 2000, he was a member of the Congress of Guanajuato and, from 2009 to 2012, he served as mayor of León.

He has been elected to the Chamber of Deputies on two occasions: in the 2000 general election and in the 2015 mid-terms, both times representing Guanajuato's 3rd district for the PAN.

Sheffield broke with the PAN in 2018 when he failed to secure the party's nomination for that year's gubernatorial election in Guanajuato. He instead stood as the candidate of a Morena-led coalition but came second to the PAN's Diego Sinhué Rodríguez.

From 2018 to 2023, he served as director of PROFECO, the federal consumer protection agency. In 2021 he again ran for mayor of León but lost to Alejandra Gutiérrez Campos of the PAN.

He was the lead candidate of the Morena-led Sigamos Haciendo Historia coalition in Guanajuato's 2024 Senate election. With the coalition receiving 43.30% of the vote over the PAN's 39.39%, Sheffield secured the state's first Senate seat for the duration of the 66th and 67th sessions of Congress.
