= Erandi Bermúdez =

Mexican politician (born 1977)

Senator for Guanajuato
- In office 1 September 2018 – 31 August 2024
- Preceded by: Juan Carlos Romero Hicks

Personal details
- Born: 15 March 1977 (age 49) Celaya, Guanajuato, Mexico
- Party: PAN
- Occupation: Politician
- Website: https://erandibermudez.com/

José Erandi Bermúdez Méndez (born 15 March 1977) is a Mexican politician affiliated with the National Action Party (PAN).

A native of Celaya, Guanajuato, he has been elected to the Chamber of Deputies for the 11th district of Guanajuato on three occasions:

- In the 2003 mid-terms, for the 59th Congress.
- In the 2009 mid-terms, for the 61st Congress.
- In the 2015 mid-terms, for the 63rd Congress.

In the 2018 general election, he was elected to the Senate for the state of Guanajuato, where he served during the 64th and 65th Congresses.
