= Alfredo Ríos Camarena =

Mexican politician

- Born: 18 October 1935 (age 90); Nayarit, Mexico
- Occupation: Politician
- Political party: PRI

Alfredo Adolfo Ríos Camarena (born 18 October 1935) is a Mexican politician from the Institutional Revolutionary Party. From 2006 to 2009 he served as Deputy of the LX Legislature of the Mexican Congress representing Nayarit.
