= Héctor Michel Camarena =

Mexican politician

- Born: 4 July 1948 (age 78); Coquimatlán, Colima, Mexico
- Education: University of Colima
- Occupations: Lawyer and politician
- Political party: PRI

Héctor Michel Camarena (born 4 July 1948) is a Mexican politician affiliated with the Institutional Revolutionary Party. A lawyer by the University of Colima, he served as a Senator of the LVIII and LIX Legislatures of the Mexican Congress representing Colima.
