= Juan Manuel Silva Camarena =

Mexican philosopher

- Born: November 6, 1945; México City, Mexico
- Education: UNAM
- Occupations: philosopher, Cathedratic Professor, and academic functionary
- Writing career
- Language: Spanish
- Notable awards: Sor Juana Inés de la Cruz University Merit Medal
- Literary movement: Metaphysics, Ethics and philosophic Anthropology
- Website: juanmanuelsilvacamarena.com

Juan Manuel Silva Camarena (Mexico City, November 6, 1945), is a Mexican philosopher, Cathedratic Professor and academic functionary.

== Biography ==
Juan Manuel Silva Camarena was born on November 6, 1945, younger son of the candy, chocolate and Mexican cream (rompope) manufacturer Heladio Silva Chávez (1887–1963) and Refugio Camarena Padilla (1913–2000), born in Ciudad Guzmán, Jalisco.

Camarena read Freud and Schopenhauer before he was 15, and while attending the Junior High School, he read the chapters that Daily El Fígaro published weekly about the Memories of José Vasconcelos, friend of his uncle, José Silva, who was professor in the Faculty of Law of the National Autonomous University of Mexico (UNAM).

When he was on High School, he visited the Faculty of Philosophy and Literature to listen some Greek or Latin classes, which complemented the compulsory classes of the Preparatoria Número 4 humanities area. There, he met the writer Juan José Arreola, who explained in a conference the adventure of his peculiar writing education, awakening in the young Juan Manuel an admiration to his auto-didactic training, as he understood he could not study Philosophy by his own, so he should look for a guide or master.

While he was attending in the 3rd year of High-School, he published his first article about vocation on the school newspaper: La Fragua Universitaria. In 1969 he was accepted to UNAM in the Philosophy Course. In 1973 he incorporated Juan Garzón Ontology course in the Facultad de Filosofía y Letras as help professor, and achieved a professor vacancy for the subject: Ethics and Mankind Knowledge in the recently founded Science and Humanities College too, where he began teaching. In Paris in 1971 he looked unsuccessfully for Jean-Paul Sartre, but he found Gabriel Marcel. He visited Sorbonne (in that days with Pierre Aubenque and his investigations about Aristoteles) and the new Paris Nanterre University (with Paul Ricoeur and his Will Philosophy, and Emmanuel Levinas and his Subjectivity Defense in his Critic to the Totality Idea).

After returning to Mexico in 1972 he was admitted as a member of the Metaphysics Seminar by Eduardo Nicol who later appointed him Academic Secretary of that Seminar, a post he held until Nicol died in 1990.

=== Education and Professional Work ===
Juan Manuel Silva Camarena learned and taught in the UNAM: in 1977 he presented a thesis about theoretic methods of philosophic knowledge that the human being has used for his own self-knowledge: Autognosis. In 1978, by own merits and the recommendation of recognized professors Nicol, Ramón Xirau, Juliana González and Wonfilio Trejo, he enjoyed an UNAM scholarship to study the master and doctorate in Philosophy.

In December 1981 he was appointed professor in the Class of Metaphysics at the Philosophy College of the Faculty of Philosophy and Literature. He also taught regularly in that Faculty Philosophic Anthropology, where he started exploring the psychoanalysis as a particular man theory.

His youth interest in psychology and Freud carried him, first, to study as second career the Degree Course in Psychology (1979), and then to make, in 1981, the Master in Psychoanalysis, at the Investigation and Psychoanalytic Studies Center which was directed by Néstor Braunstein and Frida Saal. That year, he redacted his investigation Hacia una metafísica del inconsciente.

He was hired as professor in the Universidad Iberoamericana in 1985, and for many years he gave courses and conferences, he directed his Philosophic Anthropology Seminar and published works and translations at the Philosophy Magazine that Rubén Sanabria ran.

== Selected publications ==
- 1986 Autognosis. Esquemas fundamentales de la filosofía del hombre. México: Editora de Letras, Ideas e Imágenes. Edición facsimilar de su tesis de licenciatura en filosofía.
- 1996 Octavio paz y la filosofía. Octavio Paz. La voz y la palabra, México:Caja/libro, edición limitada. Universidad del Claustro de Sor Juana.
- 2003 Meditaciones sobre el trabajo, México: Facultad de Contaduría y Administración, Universidad Nacional Autónoma de México.

=== Bibliography ===
- Dialnet
- Iresie
- José Contreras

=== Essays ===
- Decir la muerte. Revista de filosofía: la lámpara de Diógenes, Por Juan Manuel Silva Camarena
- Que la verdad cuestaRevista de filosofía: La lámpara de Diógenes, Por Juan Manuel Silva Camarena
- Sobre la administración Comentarios a un texto de Bunge Por Juan Manuel Silva Camarena
- ¿Qué es eso de ética profesional?,
- Leer a Rousseau. ¿Las cadenas de la libertad?, Por Juan Manuel Silva Camarena
- Varios textos en la Revista Contaduría y administración, Por Juan Manuel Silva Camarena
- Humanismo técnica y tecnología, Por Juan Manuel Silva Camarena
- El exilio de las cosas. Mercancía y mercantilismo, Por Juan Manuel Silva Camarena
- La ciencia: un asunto de palabras, Por Juan Manuel Silva Camarena
