= Gene Camarena =

American businessman

- Born: Salina, Kansas, U.S.
- Education: University of Kansas (BS, 1979); Harvard University (MBA, 1987)
- Occupation: President/CEO of La Raza Pizza
- Spouse: Yolanda Camarena (m. 1988)
- Children: 2
- Awards: § Awards and recognition

Gene Camarena is an American businessman. He is currently the president and CEO of La Raza Pizza, a Pizza Hut franchisee which operates over 60 locations in Indiana, Texas, and New Mexico. He also has business interests in Marriott hotels, banking, and real estate.

== Personal life ==
Camarena was born and raised in Salina, Kansas, United States. He attended Sacred Heart High School, where he played on the football team. After high school, he attended the University of Kansas (KU), where he graduated in 1979 with a Bachelor of Science degree in Accounting and Business Administration, and Harvard University, where he received his Master of Business Administration degree in 1987. After attending KU, Camarena moved to Wichita, Kansas, where he has lived since, except for his two years spent at Harvard. He married Yolanda Camarena, née Barrera, on December 10, 1988. Together, they have two daughters.

== Pizza Hut career ==
After attending Harvard, Camarena returned to Wichita to work for Pizza Hut as a corporate employee, where his efforts focused on the delivery aspect of the business. He was also on the Pizza Hut Advertising Committee. In 1991, Camarena purchased eight Pizza Hut locations in the Texas panhandle. At the time, half of these stores were not profitable, and Camarena had to take care of his 2-year-old daughter with his wife pregnant with their second daughter. Now, Camarena's franchisee company, La Raza Pizza, has grown to oversee over 60 Pizza Hut locations and has been recognized as one of the top 150 largest Hispanic-owned companies in the United States. Camarena has served three terms as the chairman of the board of directors of the International Pizza Hut Franchise Holders Association (IPHFHA), an organization which represents over 5,500 Pizza Hut locations. In 2018, he was inducted into the IPHFHA Hall of Fame.

== Community involvement ==
Camarena donated $100,000 in 1997 (equivalent to $195,875 in 2024) to establish scholarships at his high school for Hispanic students. In 2009, Camarena joined the board of directors of the Hispanic Scholarship Fund and serves as the board chair and the chair of the audit committee. Gene and Yolanda Camarena gave $1 million to Wichita State University in 2020. Over half of that amount was designated for scholarships for Hispanic and Black students. On September 30, 2022, Camarena was elected a trustee of the KU Endowment. Camarena is the Board Chair of the Kansas Big Brothers Big Sisters, as well as a member of the finance committee of the Holy Savior Catholic Church in Wichita. He is also a member of the boards of directors of Empower, Quick Hire, Hispanics in Real Estate, United Way, and the Pizza Hut Foundation.

== Awards and recognition ==
In 2013, Camarena and his wife were inducted into the Mid-America Entrepreneurship Hall of Fame. Gene and Yolanda also both received honorary doctorates from Newman University in Wichita. In 2023, they received honorary doctorates from Wichita State University. On June 13, 2024, Gene and Yolanda were inducted together as the Kansas Business Hall of Fame 2024 contemporary honorees.
