= Alejandra Gutiérrez Campos =

Mexican politician (born 1976)

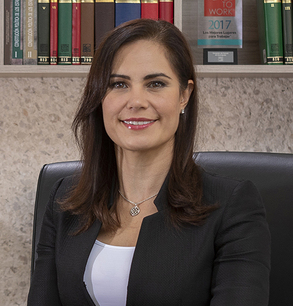
- Gutiérrez in 2022

Mayor of León
- Incumbent
- Assumed office 10 October 2021
- Preceded by: Héctor López Santillana

Personal details
- Born: 8 November 1976 (age 49)
- Party: National Action Party (2006–2026); Citizens' Movement (since 2026)

Alejandra Gutiérrez Campos (Note: In this Mexican name, the surname is Gutiérrez and the second or maternal family name is Campos.) (born 8 November 1976) is a Mexican politician serving as mayor of León, Guanajuato, since 2021. From 2015 to 2018, she was a member of the Chamber of Deputies, representing Guanajuato's 6th district. From 2018 to 2021, she was a member of the Congress of Guanajuato.

Gutiérrez Campos was born in San Juan de los Lagos, Jalisco. She was an active member of the National Action Party (PAN) from 2006 until resigning her party membership in April 2026. A few days later she joined the Citizens' Movement (MC), which described her as a potential future gubernatorial candidate for that party.

== See also ==
- List of municipal presidents of León, Guanajuato
