= Tomás Gutiérrez Ramírez =

Mexican politician

- Born: 21 December 1969 (age 56); Salamanca, Guanajuato, Mexico
- Occupation: Politician
- Political party: PAN

Tomás Gutiérrez Ramírez (born 21 December 1969) is a Mexican politician from the National Action Party (PAN).

He served as a local deputy in the Congress of Guanajuato from 2006 to 2009 and, in the 2003 mid-terms, he was elected to the Chamber of Deputies to represent Guanajuato's 8th district during the 61st session of Congress.
