= Miguel Hernández (footballer, born 1984) =

Chilean footballer (born 1984)

Personal information
- Full name: Miguel Ángel Hernández Ortiz
- Date of birth: 19 June 1984 (age 42)
- Place of birth: Santiago, Chile
- Height: 1.74 m (5 ft 8 1/2 in)
- Positions: Midfielder; striker

Team information
- Current team: Santiago Morning
- Number: 10

Youth career
- Universidad de Chile

Senior career*
Years	Team	Apps	(Gls)
2005	Universidad de Chile	0	(0)
2006–	Santiago Morning	82	(12)
2011–2012	Universidad de Concepción (loan)	25	(1)
- * Club domestic league appearances and goals as of 4 November 2012

Miguel Ángel Hernández Ortiz (born July 19, 1984), is a Chilean footballer, and currently plays for Santiago Morning in the Primera División Chilena.
