= Pilar Ortega Martínez =

Mexican politician (born 1968)

María del Pilar Ortega Martínez
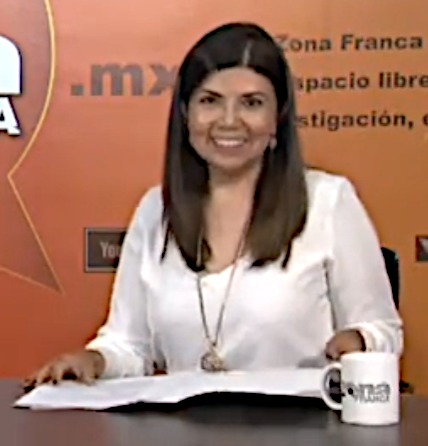
- In 2016
- Born: 29 June 1968 (age 57)
- Occupation: Politician
- Political party: PAN

María del Pilar Ortega Martínez (born 29 June 1968) is a Mexican politician affiliated with the National Action Party (PAN).

== Biography ==
She served as an alternate senator during the 62nd Congress, taking office on 9 October 2012 after the death of Alonso Lujambio.

She also sat in the Chamber of Deputies in 2006–2009 (60th Congress) as a plurinominal deputy, and in 2018–2021 (64th Congress) for Guanajuato's 6th district.
