= Humberto Andrade Quezada =

Mexican politician

- Born: 1 May 1955 (age 71); León, Guanajuato, Mexico
- Occupation: Politician
- Political party: PAN

Humberto Andrade Quezada (born 1 May 1955) is a Mexican politician affiliated with the National Action Party (PAN). He was born in León, Guanajuato.

In the 1994 general election, he was elected to the Chamber of Deputies to represent Guanajuato's 11th district during the 56th session of Congress. He was later elected to the Senate for the state of Guanajuato in the 2006 general election, where he served during the 60th and 61st congressional sessions.
