= Enrique Camarena Robles =

Mexican psychiatrist

Enrique Camarena Robles (born 1957) is a Mexican psychiatrist, doctor and President of the Asociación Ibero-Latinoamericana de Neurociencias y Psiquiatría (AILANCYP).

== Biography ==
Enrique Camarena Robles was born in Mexico City, Mexico in 1957. He graduated in medicine in 1981 at the "Escuela Mexicana de Medicina" at the Universidad de “La Salle” in Mexico City, he finished the psychiatry specialty at the “Hospital Psiquiátrico Fray Bernardino Álvarez” of the "Secretaria de Salud" in 1986, and studied the master in child psychiatry at the "Hospital Psiquiátrico Dr. Juan N. Navarro" of the same Secretaria. He studied the subspecialty in Psychoanalytic Psychotherapy at the "Círculo de Psicoterapia Psicoanalítica de México" in 1991.

At institutional level, he has worked in the board of the some programs and departments in the Mexican Social Security Institute and the Secretaría de Salud (Health Ministry) of the Federal Government.

He is the co-organizer, jointly with Edgard Belfort, Lluis Sánchez-Planell and Julio Vallejo Ruiloba, of the Internacional Symposium on Controversias in Psychiatry (México venue), which is held annually in Mexico City, Mexico. This symposium is twinned with the International Symposium on Current Issues and Controversies in Psychiatry which takes place annually in Barcelona, Spain, since 1993. Formerly he also has organized the 2010 congress of the Asociación Psiquiátrica de América Latina (APAL) in Puerto Vallarta, and the annual national congress of the Asociación Psiquiátrica Mexicana (APM) in Cancún in 2002.

He is the president of the Asociación Iberolatinoamericana de Neurociencias y Psiquiatría (AILANCYP) and former president of the Asociación Psiquiátrica de América Latina (APAL).

In the private professional side he has been managing for 15 years his own consultancy treating all psychiatric problems in children, adolescents and adult.
