= 2006 Guanajuato state election =

A local election was held in the Mexican state of Guanajuato on Sunday, July 2, 2006. Voters went to the polls to elect, on the local level:

- A new Governor of Guanajuato to serve for a six-year term.
- 46 municipal presidents (mayors) to serve for a three-year term.
- 36 local deputies (22 by the first-past-the-post system and 14 by proportional representation) to serve for a three-year term in the Congress of Guanajuato.

== Gubernatorial Election ==
Eight political parties participated in the 2006 Guanajuato state election.

Party/Alliance	Candidate
Alliance PAN–PANAL	Juan Manuel Oliva Ramírez
Alliance for Mexico (PRI–PVEM)	Miguel Ángel Chico Herrera
Alliance PRD–PT	Ricardo García Oseguera
Social Democratic and Farmer Alternative	
Convergence	
