= Miguel Ángel Chico Herrera =

Mexican lawyer and politician

Miguel Ángel Chico Herrera (born in Irapuato, Guanajuato, on March 17, 1961) is a Mexican lawyer and politician affiliated with the Institutional Revolutionary Party (PRI). He was president of the party, charge that he held from 2005 to 2009. In March 2006 he became the PRI candidate for the governorship of Guanajuato, in the state elections held on July 2, 2006. Chico has also run for mayor of Celaya, local deputy and federal deputy. He has been director of the newspaper El Sol del Bajío in his native Guanajuato. He is currently a local congressman in the Congress of Guanajuato and the representative of all Local Congress in Mexico before the America's Parliamentary Confederation (COPA).

He resides in Guanajuato, Guanajuato, and is married to Maria Eugenia Rodríguez Nieto and has a son, Alfonso and a daughter Eugenia.
