= Miguel Gutiérrez Hernández =

Mexican politician

- Born: 28 September 1963 (age 62); León, Guanajuato, Mexico
- Occupation: Politician
- Political party: PAN

Miguel Gutiérrez Hernández (born 28 September 1963) is a Mexican politician from the National Action Party (PAN). In the 2000 general election, he was elected to the Chamber of Deputies to represent Guanajuato's 5th district during the 58th session of Congress.
