= León Municipality, Guanajuato =

- Municipality
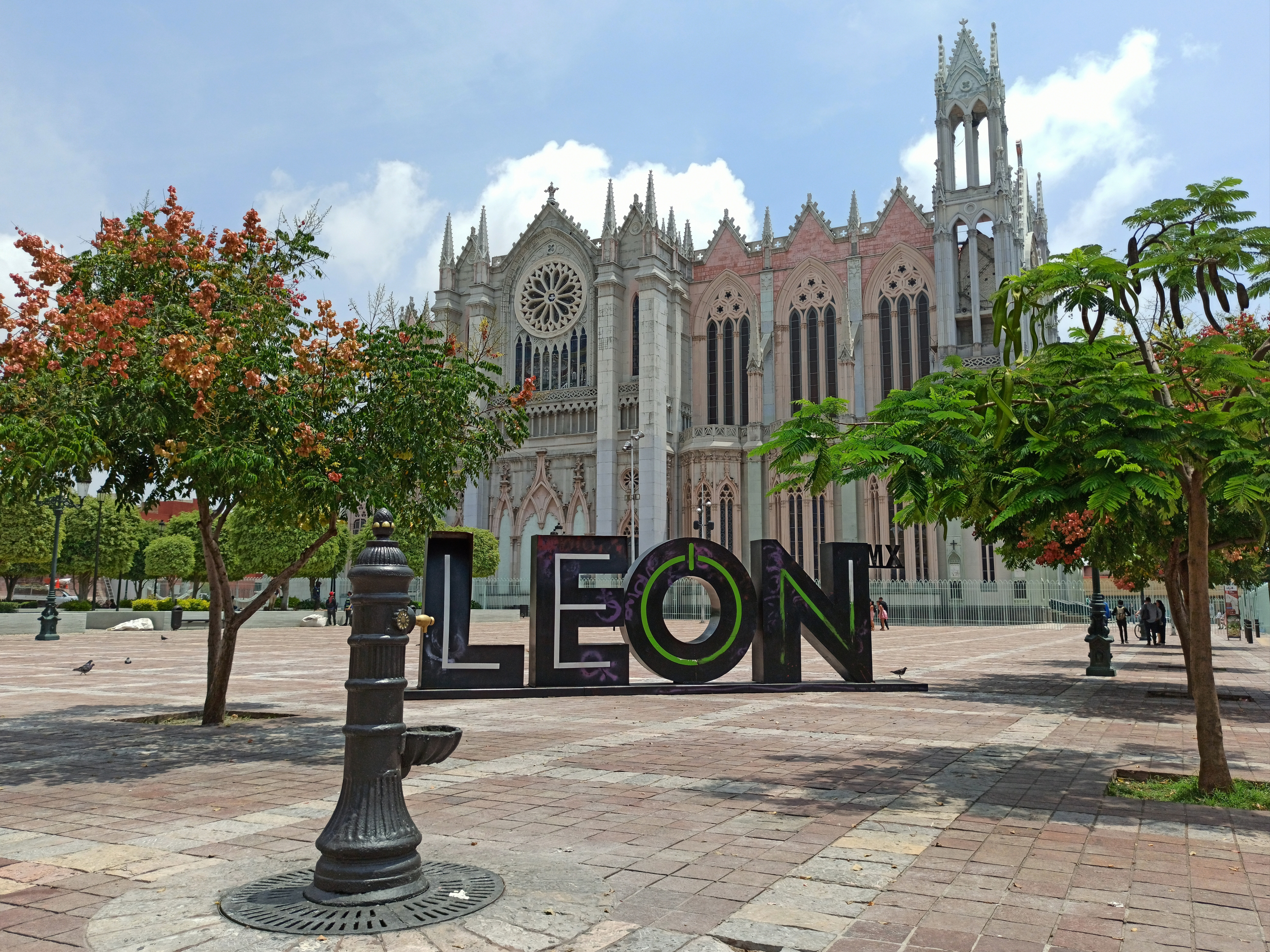
- Sign in the Plaza Expiatorio

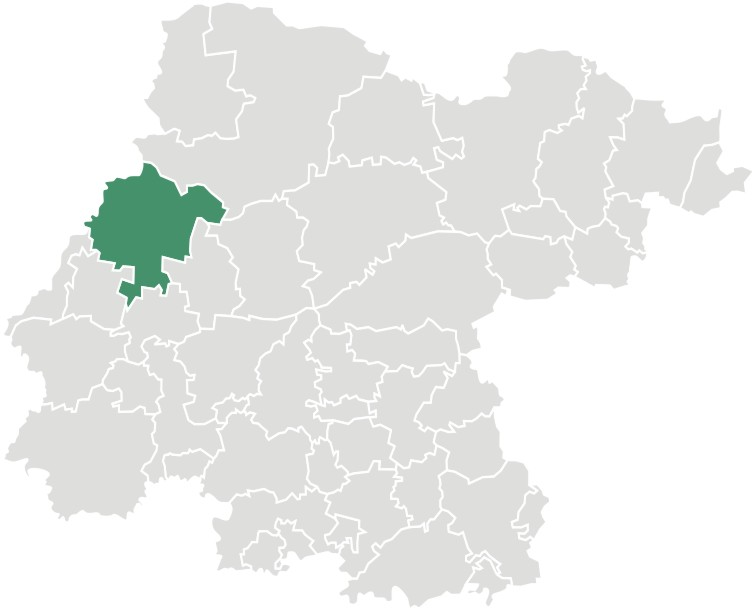
- Municipality of León in Guanajuato

- Location within Guanajuato Location within Mexico
- Coordinates: 21°07′11″N 101°40′50″W
- Country: Mexico
- State: Guanajuato
- Municipal seat: León

Area
  - Total: 1,221 km^{2} (471 sq mi)

Population (2020)
  - Total: 1,721,215
- Time zone: UTC-6 (Zona Centro (US Central))

León Municipality is a municipality in the state of Guanajuato. Its municipal seat is located in the city of León. According to the 2020 census, the municipality had a population of 1,721,215.

It is the third most populous municipality in Mexico, behind Mexico City and Tijuana. The city contains about 91% of the municipalities' population.

== See also ==
- List of municipal presidents of León, Guanajuato
