= Mexican Network of People Affected by Mining =

Mexican organization

- Red Mexicana de Afectados por la Minería
- Abbreviation: REMA
- Formation: June 2008; 18 years ago
- Founded at: Temacapulin, Jalisco
- Purpose: Environmental activism and human rights
- Location: Mexico
- Founders: Mariano Abarca, Bety Cariño
- Website: https://www.remamx.org/

Mexican Network of People Affected by Mining (Spanish: Red Mexicana de Afectados por la Minería, REMA) is a Mexican group that campaigns for political change and ecological conservation and against open-pit mining.

Two founders of the group were murdered within two years of the organization being founded.

== Description ==
The group is part of the Mesoamerican Movement Against the Mining Extractive Mode, known as M4. The group campaigns to end open-pit mining.

== History ==
The organization was founded in June 2008 in the Temacapulin village of Jalisco. Founders included Mariano Abarca and Bety Cariño. In 2009, Abarca was assassinated Cariño was murdered in 2010.

At the time, the group was protesting against Blackfire Exploration's work at its La Revancha mine.

In 2022, the group was critical of the limitations of the nationalisation of Mexico's lithium, noting the reform did not take control of existing mines. The group predicted that Canadian and U.S. corporation would be the main beneficiaries of the reforms.
