= Autonomous Municipality of San Juan Copala =

The Autonomous Municipality of San Juan Copala is an entity made up of Trique Indians who seceded from Mexico in 2006 as a reaction to repression by the Mexican state, especially the Oaxacan government, whose leader Ulises Ruiz was targeted by the APPO movement at the time. The move was inspired by the Zapatista Movement in neighbouring Chiapas. It has since been the target of violent attacks by the local paramilitary groups UBISORT and MULT which are related to the PRI, the party of Ulises Ruiz.
