= Alejandro Murat Hinojosa =

Governor of Oaxaca, Mexico

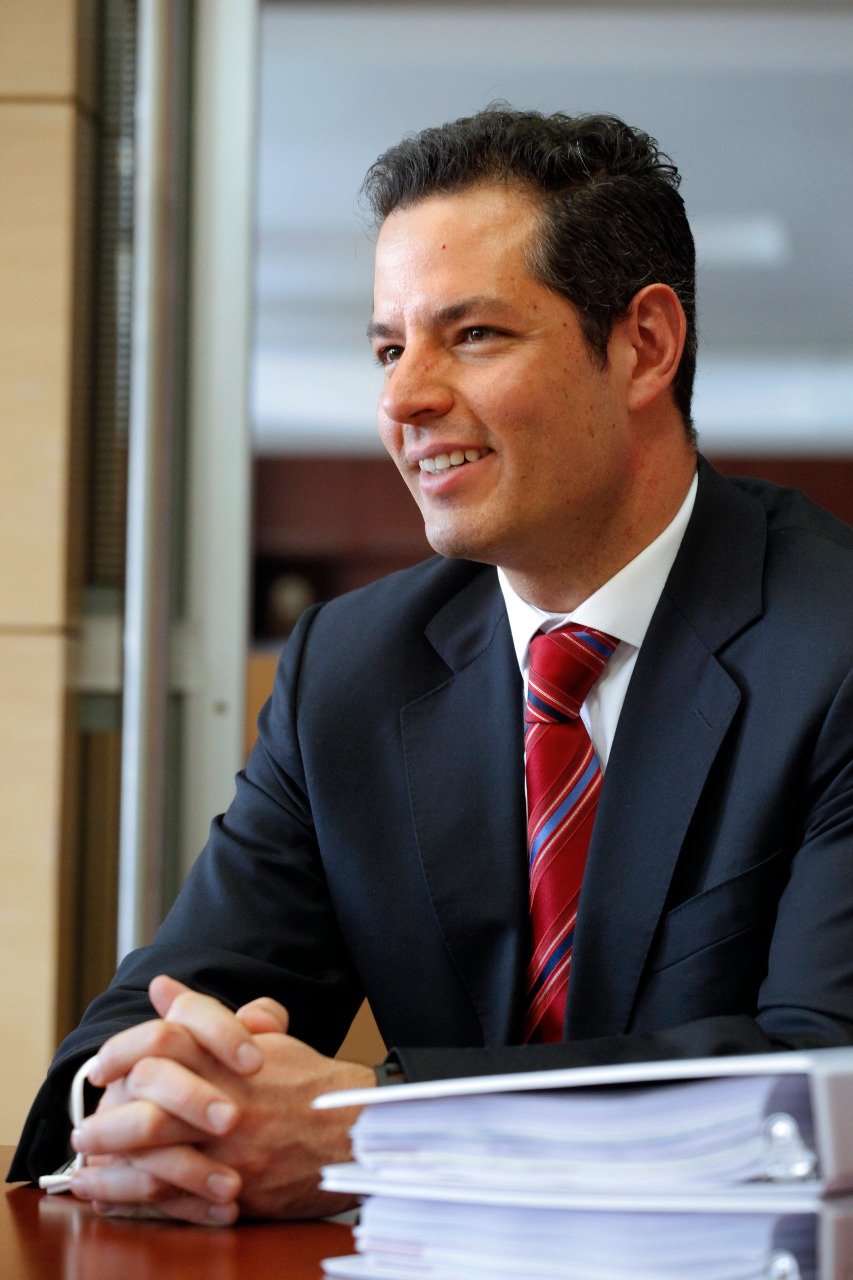
- Murat in August 2019.

Governor of Oaxaca
- In office 1 December 2016 – 30 November 2022
- Preceded by: Gabino Cué Monteagudo
- Succeeded by: Salomón Jara Cruz

Director-General of INFONAVIT
- In office 1 December 2012 – 1 December 2015
- President: Enrique Peña Nieto
- Preceded by: Víctor Manuel Borrás Setién
- Succeeded by: David Penchyna Grub

Personal details
- Born: Alejandro Ismael Murat Hinojosa; 4 August 1975 (age 51) Tlalnepantla de Baz, State of Mexico, Mexico
- Party: National Regeneration Movement (since 2024); Institutional Revolutionary Party (1993-2023)
- Spouse: Ivette Moran
- Education: Autonomous Technological Institute of Mexico (LLB); Columbia University (LLM)
- Occupation: Politician

Alejandro Ismael Murat Hinojosa (born August 4, 1975) is a Mexican politician affiliated with Morena. He was elected Governor of Oaxaca in 2016 as a member of the Institutional Revolutionary Party and took office from December 1, 2016, to November 30, 2022.

== Life ==
Murat Hinojosa was born on August 4, 1975, in the State of Mexico; his father, José Murat Casab, was also a PRI politician who served as governor of Oaxaca from 1998 to 2004. In 2001, he obtained his law degree from the ITAM. He later received a master's degree in law from Columbia University.

He served as an alternate deputy to the LIX Legislature of the Mexican Congress for the Federal District, and on October 28, 2004, he took the place of Jorge Ortiz Alvarado when he asked to resign. In his two years in San Lázaro, he presided over the Special Commission for Competitiveness and Regional Development and also served on the Communications Commission.

From 2007 to 2009, he was the director general of the Institute of Registral Functions of the State of Mexico, which oversees real estate and land transactions; from 2009 to 2011, he directed the Sistema de Radio y Televisión Mexiquense. He served as housing coordinator for Enrique Peña Nieto's presidential campaign and headed INFONAVIT from December 11, 2012 to December 1, 2015; during his leadership, reforms were made to the management of mortgages at the workers' housing agency.

Murat resigned from INFONAVIT in order to run as the PRI candidate for governor of Oaxaca. There were several questions about whether Murat qualified for the office, given that Article 23 of the Oaxaca state constitution says that only citizens of the state can run for its elected offices. The case was taken to the Supreme Court of Justice of the Nation, which unanimously ruled that Murat was eligible because both of his parents were born in that state, and the state constitution defines any child of a parent from Oaxaca as a citizen of that state. He ran under a PRI-PVEM-Nueva Alianza coalition and won on June 5, 2016.

Murat was on board the helicopter which crashed in February 2018 while surveying the damage done by the recent earthquake. 15 people were killed in the crash, but Murat and fellow politician Alfonso Navarrete Prida escaped with comparatively minor injuries.

== Candidate for Governor of Oaxaca 2016 ==
In December 2015, Murat Hinojosa left his position at the head of INFONAVIT to formally announce his candidacy for the PRI candidate for Governor of Oaxaca.

He was Governor of the State of Oaxaca for the period 2016-2022.

He was a candidate for governor for the "Juntos hacemos más" coalition, made up of the Revolucionario Institucional, Verde Ecologista de México and Nueva Alianza parties.

== Public charges ==
As a Plurinominal Federal Deputy in the LIX Legislature (2004-2006), by the then Federal District, 3 was present at the creation of the Special Commission for Competitiveness and Regional Development4, which he chaired.

At the local level he served as General Director of the Radio and Television System Mexiquense5 (2009-2011). From 2007 to 2009, he was General Director of the Institute of the Registry Function of his native State.

Before directing Infonavit, he served as the Housing Coordinator in the transition team of the then President-elect, Enrique Peña Nieto.

He left the post of Director General of Infonavit on December 1, 2015.

== Personal life ==
He is married to Ivette Murat. Alejandro is of Iraqi descent from his father's side.
