= 2010 Mexican gubernatorial elections =

Gubernatorial elections were held in fourteen Mexican states on Sunday, July 4, 2010. The gubernatorial elections were held simultaneously with other state and local elections. Elections for governor were held in Aguascalientes, Chiapas, Chihuahua, Durango, Hidalgo, Oaxaca, Puebla, Quintana Roo, Sinaloa, Tamaulipas, Tlaxcala, Veracruz and Zacatecas.

A multi-party alliance between President Felipe Calderón's National Action Party (PAN) and left-wing parties won elections in Oaxaca, Puebla and Sinaloa.

The Institutional Revolutionary Party (PRI), led by Beatriz Paredes, captured Aguascalientes and Tlaxcala from PAN and also picked up the governor's mansion in Zacatecas from the Party of the Democratic Revolution (PRD).

== State Gubernatorial elections ==
=== Aguascalientes ===
The results indicated an Institutional Revolutionary Party (PRI) pick-up from the National Action Party (PAN).

=== Chihuahua ===
The Institutional Revolutionary Party (PRI) held Chihuahua.

=== Durango ===
The Institutional Revolutionary Party (PRI) held Durango.

=== Hidalgo ===
The Institutional Revolutionary Party (PRI) held Hidalgo.

=== Oaxaca ===
The incumbent government of Institutional Revolutionary Party (PRI) Governor Ulises Ruiz Ortiz was seen as increasingly repressive and corrupt by voters and political observers. Ruiz oversaw the crackdown on left-wing protesters in the city of Oaxaca in 2006, leading to at least seventeen deaths. Ruiz was also believed to be linked to Oaxacan paramilitary groups which are responsible to violence and deaths in rural areas of Oaxaca.

On the day of the election, Oaxacan police arrested 39 people for possessing bomb making materials in two hotels.

A party alliance between the state's largest vote winner, the Peace and Progress Coalition led by Gabino Cue, ousted the PRI from power.

=== Puebla ===
An alliance between the National Action Party (PAN), the Party of the Democratic Revolution (PRD) and smaller parties won Puebla from the Institutional Revolutionary Party (PRI). PAN-PRD pick-up.

=== Quintana Roo ===
The Institutional Revolutionary Party (PRI) held Hidalgo. The mayor of Cancún had been arrested during the campaign for alleged connections to drug traffickers.

=== Sinaloa ===
An alliance between the National Action Party (PAN), the Party of the Democratic Revolution (PDR) and smaller parties appear to have won Sinaloa from the incumbent Institutional Revolutionary Party (PRI). PAN-PDR pick-up.

=== Tamaulipas ===
The gubernatorial election in Tamaulipas was marred by the violent assassination of the leading PRI candidate, Rodolfo Torre Cantú, and four members of his campaign on June 28, 2010. His brother, Egidio, became the PRI candidate following the assassination.

The Institutional Revolutionary Party (PRI) held Tamaulipas.

=== Tlaxcala ===
The Institutional Revolutionary Party (PRI) won Tlaxcala from the National Action Party (PAN). PRI pick-up.

=== Veracruz ===
The Institutional Revolutionary Party (PRI) held Veracruz.

=== Zacatecas ===
The Institutional Revolutionary Party (PRI) won Zacatecas from the left-wing Party of the Democratic Revolution (PRD). PRI pick-up.
