= Frente Indígena de Organizaciones Binacionales =

Human rights organization based in Los Angeles, California

The Binational Front of Indigenous Organizations (Spanish: Frente Indígena Organizacionales Binacionales, FIOB), formerly the Binational Front of Mixteco-Zapotec (Spanish: Frente Mixteco-Zapoteco Binacional), emerged in 1991 in Los Angeles, California. The FIOB was founded from six Oaxacan migrant organizations: the Mixtec Popular Civic Committee (Spanish: Comité Cívico Popular Mixteco), the Organization of Exploited and Oppressed People (Spanish: Organización de Pueblo Explotado y Oprimido), the Committee from Tlacolula in Los Angeles (Spanish: Comité Tlacolulense en Los Ángeles), the Organization for Macuiltianguis (Spanish: Organización Pro-Ayuda a Macuiltianguis), the Benito Juárez Civic Association (Spanish: Asociación Cívica Benito Juárez), and the Regional Organization from Oaxaca (Spanish: Organización Regional de Oaxaca). It is an indigenous migrant-advocacy group in California, active in Los Angeles, Fresno, and Santa Maria with an office in Juxtlahuaca, Oaxaca.

The FIOB describes itself as "a group of organizations, communities, and individuals (men and women) of diverse origins, who have decided to combine efforts, ideas, and projects that overcome the economic, political, social and cultural problems that our indigenous sisters and brothers face." "Migrants and non-migrants unite in Mexico and the United States (USA) to fight for respect for their rights and identity as indigenous peoples." Its purpose is "joining efforts as indigenous peoples to fight for their rights," and its objectives align with preserving and promoting indigenous cultures while focusing on indigenous identity and securing indigenous rights. The organization uses community-based projects to promote human rights for indigenous peoples, promoting "family health, community integration, gender equality, and collaborations with other organizations."

== Goals ==
The organization's mission is to "contribute to the development and self-determination of migrant and non-migrant indigenous peoples, as well as fight for the defense of human rights with justice and gender equality at the binational level". Odilia Romero, a FIOB-affiliated human-rights activist, said that the FIOB emphasizes "decolonizing the indigenous mind" and recognizing injustices faced by indigenous communities across Latin America and the United States with practices that promote solidarity among indigenous groups. The organization creates and promotes programs to bolster civic participation and social, cultural, and economic growth, stressing the importance of connecting and representing indigenous cultural and traditional practices. Examples include hosting traditional festivities, creating the El Tequito bi-national magazine, and offering entrepreneurial classes in the US and Mexico. It works at the local and national levels for social justice, gender equity, and the recognition and protection of indigenous human rights, and is committed to "creating a participatory and democratic immigrant politics that respects human rights."

According to Marisol Gutiérrez of the North American Congress on Latin America (NACLA), the FIOB has three primary demands:

1. Improved services to migrants from the Instituto Oaxaqueño de Atención al Migrante (IOAM), such as the production of birth certificates and the transportation of corpses
2. Improved access to education and economic opportunities in order to prevent migration from necessity – "el derecho a no migrar" (the right not to migrate)
3. The end of destruction in San Juan Copala, Oaxaca, which has been experiencing violence at the hands of pro-government paramilitaries since 2007

"The members of the FIOB assume the commitment to fight loyally for the principles of freedom, justice, democracy and equality for our people, understanding this as the right of our communities to their political and economic autonomy, that is, their right to freely decide their destination; to the improvement of their material life, to respect for their human rights, their territory, their natural resources and their culture". The organization stands in solidarity with other minority groups worldwide who are struggling to break free of injustice, hunger, marginalization, political persecution, and other human-rights violations. The FIOB works to change the structures that have caused misery, lack of democracy, unemployment, and health issues in the indigenous communities of Mexico and the US by supporting similar organizations and campaigns. It has a peaceful mobilization process to organize its members and present demands to authorities.

== Timeline ==
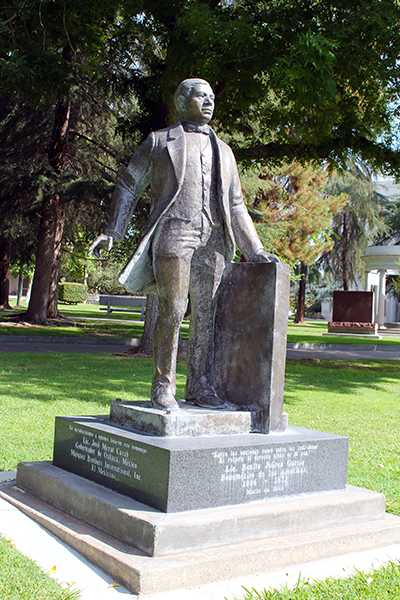
A statue of Benito Juárez in Fresno, California, erected in 2003 with the efforts and support of the FIOB

- July 24–26, 1992 - First international Conference on Migration and Human Rights, for communities to foster autonomy and expansion
- December 7, 1992 - Organizational gathering at the Mexican consulate in Los Angeles after the election of Diodoro Carrasco Altamirano as governor of Oaxaca
- December 22, 1992 - Assists in the release of six mixtecos who were detained for three months in Oklahoma City by immigration officials
- January 9, 1993 - Labor orientation and education project, educating migrants on their labor rights in their native indigenous languages
- March 1993 - Farmer to Farmer Program, supplying technical assistance with capturing drinking water and understanding irrigation with the University of Arizona
- April 1993 - Centro Binacional Para El Desarrollo Indigena Oaxaqueño, a bi-national fundraising project for the FIOB
- September 24, 1993 - An agreement between the FIOB and the United Farm Workers
- January 3–8, 1996 - Foro Indígena Nacional, where the Zapatista Army of National Liberation (EZLN) and the FIOB meet with indigenous communities to discuss migrant rights
- April 5, 1996 - Fifty people demonstrate at the federal building in Fresno as a result of police brutality against fellow Mexicans in Riverside
- May 19, 1996 - Indigenous migrant women meet at the Conferencia de Mujeres Indígenas Migrantes in Fresno to discuss women's rights. Discussion topics include alcoholism, domestic violence, and organizing.
- 2002 - For the 2010 census, the FIOB campaigns for the inclusion of indigenous identities.
- October 9, 2002 - A new FIOB office opens in Tijuana for coordination and the support of incoming migrants.
- 2006 - May First Committee formed in Fresno for immigration reform and organization of an annual march. The FIOB organizes a bi-national protest in support of the 2006 Oaxaca rebellion against Ulises Ruiz Ortiz and his violence against indigenous communities.
- November 7, 2007 - The Border Summit of Indigenous Peoples, which demanded sovereignty and action by the United Nations to end human-rights violations and the destruction of natural ecosystems
- May 30 – June 1, 2008 - Bi-national General Assembly, at which new leaders are elected. Workshops and programs to develop leadership development by women and youth are announced. Immigration reform is supported, and the criminalization of undocumented workers is opposed.
- 2014 - First FIOB state assembly in Vista, California. The organization meets with the governor of Oaxaca, delivering petitions and demands from Oaxaca, Baja California, and California.
- 2015 - The FIOB rejects militarization in Oaxaca as a result of elections, which criminalizes social protest against social injustice. The state assembly is held in Fresno, and a bi-national conference is held in Mexico City.
- 2017 - The FIOB is left in charge of five Oaxacan children raised in the US, despite threats to the immigrant community by incoming president Donald Trump.
- 2018 - Yolozee Odilia Romero Xhogosho, the FIOB's first woman leader, represents the organization at the inauguration of the new Mexican president. After 27 years of funding the FIOB, Odilia Romero is elected as the organization's first female bi-national general coordinator. The FIOB rehabilitates the Juxtlahuaca-Santa Maria Yucunicoco, Juxtlahuaca road.
- 2019 - For the United Nations' International Year of Indigenous Languages, the FIOB and Comunidades Indigenas en Liderazgo (CIELO) organize a gathering of interpreters to train others about the proper use of their indigenous mother tongues.

The FIOB has organized efforts to preserve cultural heritage. One issue for the indigenous migrant community is the language barrier. In an interview, Odilia Romero said that a Triqui man who was put in an asylum because no one understood him; no one knew that he was speaking an indigenous language. The FIOB decided to hold educational workshops about indigenous languages for institutions and public servants such hospitals, schools, police, and judges. The FIOB supported a 1993 interpreters' project. According to Odilia, the consulates rely on FIOB interpreters instead of providing their own: "We are doing the work that consulates should be doing. The consulate should provide the interpreters, the consulate should work to defend the rights of Indian communities, but this is not the case. We train the interpreters. The consulate calls us to say, 'I need an interpreter in this language.'" Another example of the FIOB's effort to preserve indigenous languages and train interpreters is the bilingual El Pipila school in Tijuana's Obrera neighborhood, which teaches Mixtec and Spanish.

== Membership and projects ==
The organization has about 5,000 accredited members. FIOB members have given transnational migrants aid with elementary education in Mexico and the US. Their services include peer counseling: helping students learn, and assisting others who may be dealing with a similar situation. These initiatives have a participatory, community-based approach to education for migrant workers. By involving them in the educational process, recognizing the power of peer networks, informal communication and community discussions, they aim to address the specific needs and challenges faced by transnational migrants. FIOB has a presence in Los Angeles, Fresno, Greenfield, Hollister, San Diego, Santa Rosa and Merced, California, with support groups in the states of Oregon, New York, Arizona, and Washington. It publishes a subscription newsletter.

The FIOB has helped organize the annual Guelaguetza in Fresno, highlighting the culture of Oaxaca's 16 ethnolinguistic groups. It works with hometown associations (HTAs), whose members find community with other transnational people in their area.
