= Maria-Pia Boëthius =

Swedish journalist, novelist, non-fiction writer and activist

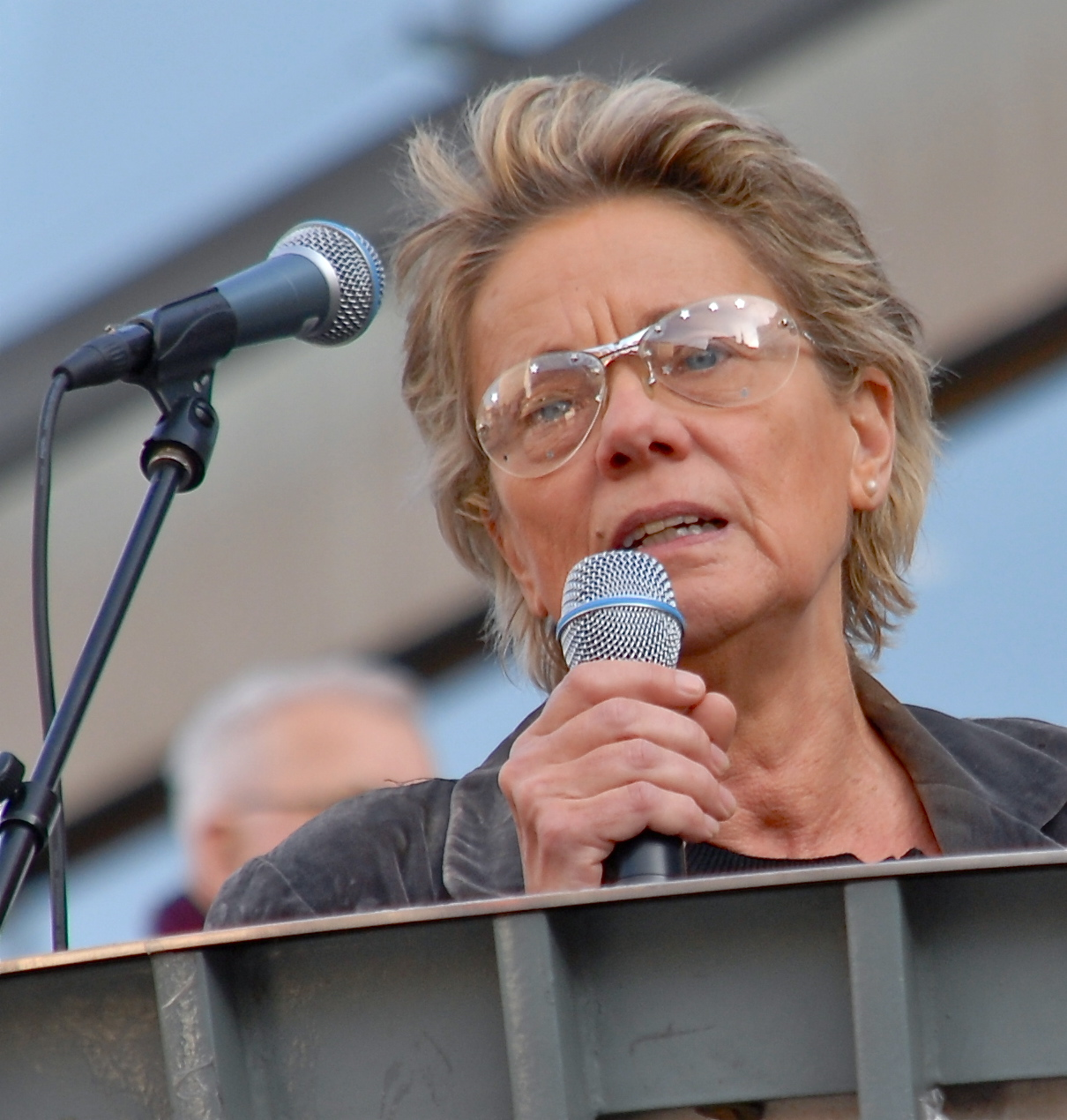
- Genre: journalism novels non-fiction
- Notable works: Expressen; Heder och samvete Svensson, Svensson
- Notable awards: Ture Nerman-priset; Dan Andersson-priset

Maria-Pia Boëthius (born 1947) is a Swedish journalist, novelist, non-fiction writer and activist. She worked as a journalist for the newspaper Expressen from 1968 to 1978. Among her books are Skylla sig själv from 1976 (on rape), Heder och samvete from 1991 (on Swedish neutrality during World War II), and Mediernas svarta bok from 2001.

She made her fiction debut in 1979 with the novel Svensson, Svensson, a reply to Ulf Lundell's novel Jack.

Boëthius was awarded Ture Nerman-priset in 1998 and Dan Andersson-priset in 2002.

Boëthius has written a lot about World War II and totalitarian ideologies. In an article in ETC 2013, she criticized the Norwegian author Karl Ove Knausgård for not reading Hitler's Mein Kampf properly and for being ignorant of the Second World War.

In 2012, she took part in the Ship to Gaza mission with SV Estelle.
