= Human rights in Mexico =

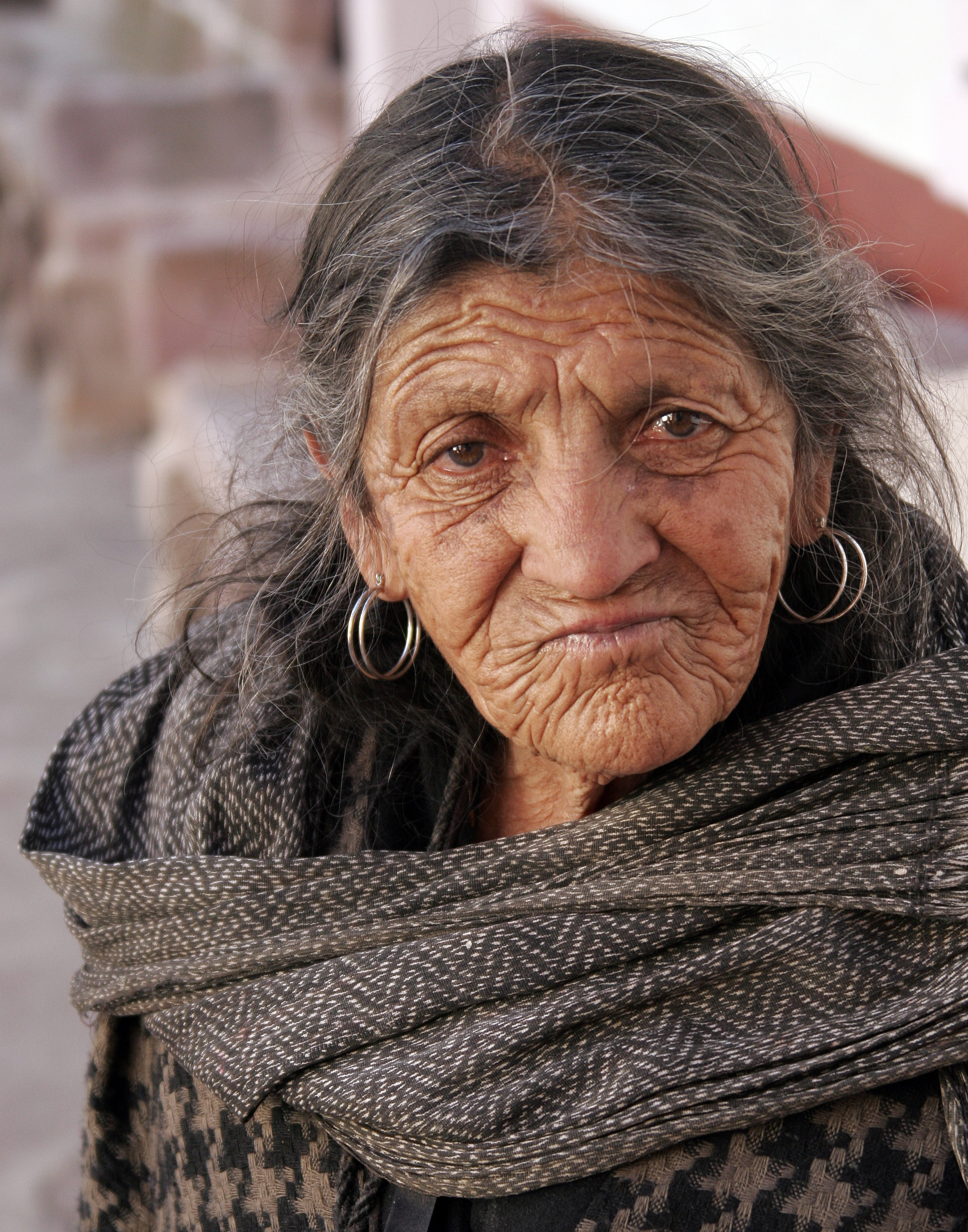
Woman from Zacatecas, Mexico

Human rights in Mexico refers to moral principles or norms that describe certain standards of human behaviour in Mexico, and are regularly protected as legal rights in municipal and international law. The problems include torture, extrajudicial killings and summary executions, police repression, sexual murder, and, more recently, news reporter assassinations.

The Human Rights Watch reports that Mexican security forces have enforced widespread disappearances since 2006. It also states that Mexican security forces commit unlawful killings of civilians at an alarmingly high rate and widely use torture including beatings, waterboarding, electric shocks, and sexual abuse as a tool to gain information from detained victims. In addition, it reports that the criminal justice system is largely failing victims of violent crimes and human rights violations when they seek justice and that attacks on journalists by authorities or organized crime will cause them to self-censor. The report also cites issues related to unaccompanied migrant children, women's and girls’ rights, sexual orientation and gender identity, palliative care, and disability rights.

While the Mexican government has taken action to fight organized crime in Mexico's drug war, security forces in Mexico have committed human rights violations that include extrajudicial killings, enforced disappearances, and torture. There have been limited efforts to investigate and prosecute these abuses. Human rights in Mexico also face difficulty in the battle to access reproductive rights and health care, and have yet to solve problems involving violence against members of the press.

== Civil Liberties ==
=== Freedom of the press ===
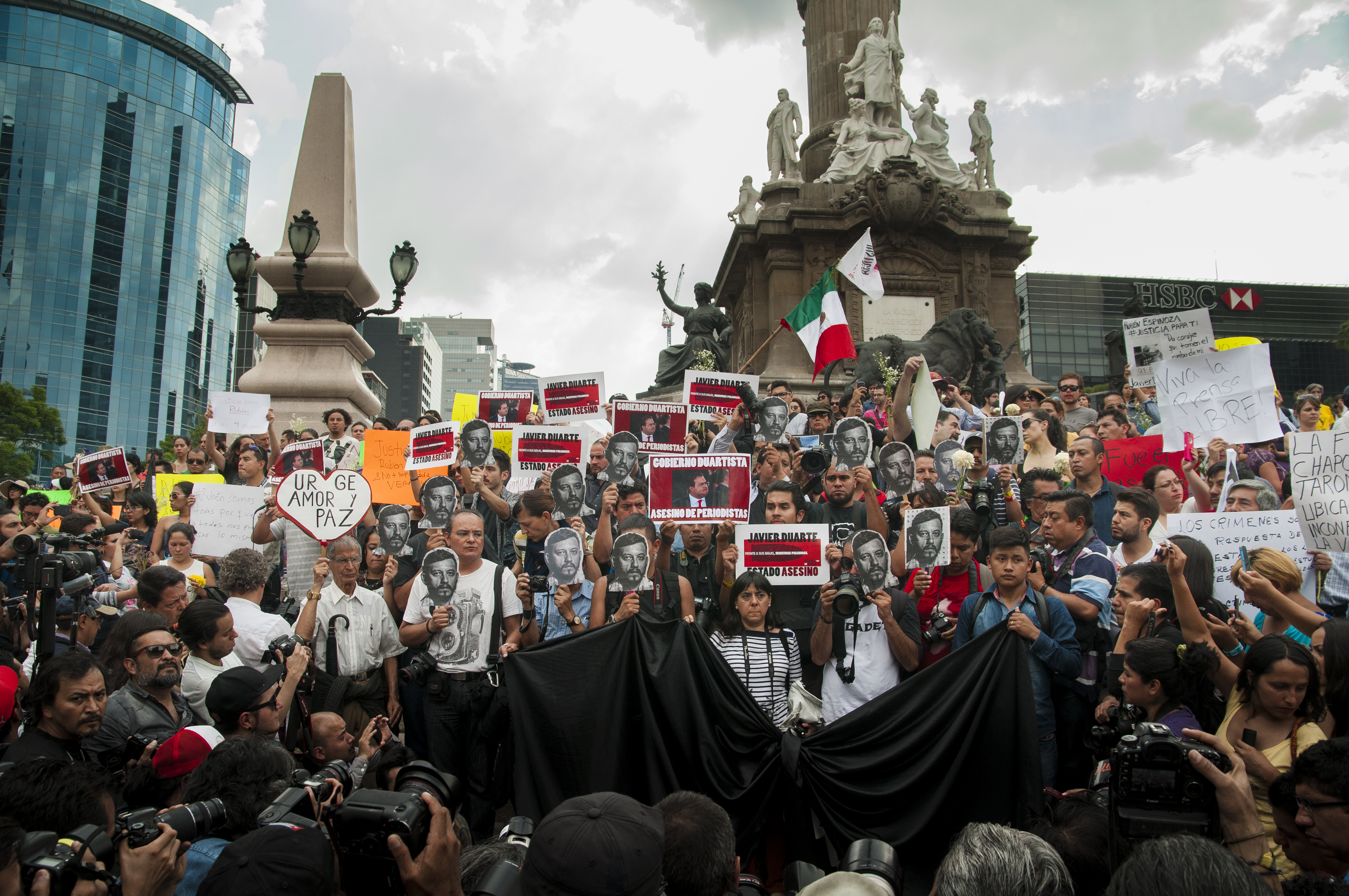
Mexican journalist Rubén Espinosa was murdered in Mexico City after fleeing death threats in Veracruz.

Mexico is one of the most dangerous countries in the world for journalists, it is among the countries with the highest levels of impunity for crimes against journalists. Violence against the media is a serious issue because while it seriously threatens the livelihood of members of the press, it also creates an “environment of fear” where free information is stifled, negatively affecting healthy democracy, and hinders freedom of expression. Though the exact figures of those killed are often conflicting, press freedom organizations around the world agree through general consensus that Mexico is among the most dangerous countries on the planet to exercise journalism as a profession. The Human Rights Watch states that Mexican authorities are ineffective in their attempts to investigate criminal actions against journalists. They also report that between the year 2000 to July 2016, the Attorney General's Office reported 124 cases of journalists being killed.

A study that focused on the socialization of future journalists found that students in Mexico are more likely than students in other large countries to hold sentiments that journalism should be loyal, meaning that journalists should perpetuate a positive image in relation to the country's leaders and the policies the government sets forth. Information and the press was often controlled in Mexico by chayote, or one-off payments, or embute, regular pay-offs given in return for twisting the stories journalists put out so they portray whatever side the bribing party prefers. Journalists were inclined to take this money as supplements to the low-wages they make and were encouraged to do so by the news organizations they work for in order for those organizations to save money. This also meant that journalists did not have to seek stories, as the government would hand them to them. Although attitudes in journalism are changing and these practices are looked down upon by contemporary journalists, these practices still affect how the general population sees journalists.

In a study conducted that focused on violence by criminal organizations, evidence showed that the sole presence of large and profitable criminal organizations does not always lead to fatal attacks, but attacks and killings are increased when there are rival groups live and work in the same territories. The rivalry between criminal organizations affects the control either criminal organization has over journalists and the information that gets leaked to them, which leads to threats and even lethal violence against journalists.

Nearly 100 media workers have been killed or disappeared since 2000, and most of these crimes remained unsolved, improperly investigated, and with few perpetrators arrested and convicted.

Occurrences of physical violence and threats against journalists covering sensitive issues have been frequent across Mexico's regions. To protect themselves, journalists must practice self-censorship.

=== Child labor ===
According to the updated version of the U.S. Department of Labor's List of Goods Produced by Child Labor or Forced Labor issued in December 2014, child labor contributes to the production of a total of 11 goods in Mexico, 10 of which are agricultural goods (including coffee, tobacco and sugarcane) and the remaining item is pornography. Among the list's 74 countries where significant instances of indentured labor have been observed, 7 countries were reported to resort to child labor in the pornography industry and Mexico was one of them.

=== Freedom of religion ===
The constitution declares that Mexico is a secular state and provides for the right to religious freedom.

In 2023, the country was scored 4 out of 4 for religious freedom.

In the same year, the country was ranked as the 38th most difficult place in the world to be a Christian.

=== LGBT rights ===
Same-sex sexual acts are legal in Mexico, but LGBT people have been prosecuted through the use of legal codes that regulate obscene or lurid behavior (atentados a la moral y las buenas costumbres). Over the past twenty years, there have been reports of violence against gay men, including the murders of openly gay men in Mexico City and of trans people in the southern state of Chiapas.

Local activists believe that these cases often remain unsolved, blaming the police for a lack of interest in investigating them and for assuming that queer people are somehow responsible for attacks against them.

=== Intersex rights ===
Intersex children in Mexico face significant human rights violations, starting from birth. There are no protections from non-consensual cosmetic medical interventions and no legislative protection from discrimination. Intersex persons may have difficulties in obtaining necessary health care.

== Other Issues ==
=== Domestic violence ===
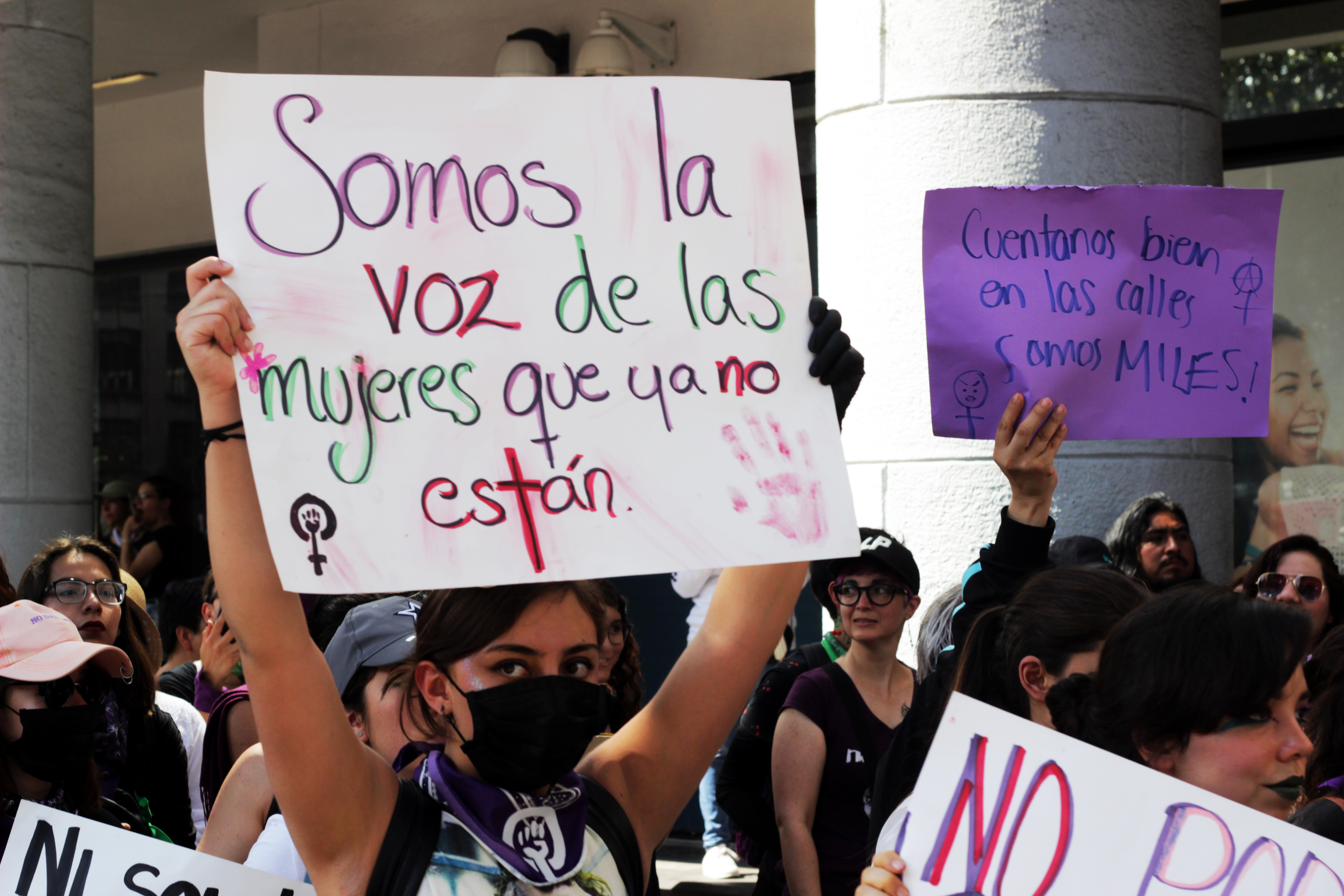
International Women's Day march in Mexico City

The rate of domestic violence against women in Mexican marital relationships varies at between 30 and 60 percent of relationships.

As of 2014, Mexico has the 16th highest rate of homicides committed against women in the world. This rate has been on the rise since 2007.

Gender violence is more prevalent in regions along the Mexico-US border and in areas of high drug trading activity and drug violence.

According to the 2013 Human Rights Watch, many women do not seek out legal redress after being victims of domestic violence and sexual assault because "the severity of punishments for some sexual offenses contingent on the "chastity" of the victim" and "those who do report them are generally met with suspicion, apathy, and disrespect."

In September 2014, several Mexican human rights groups and International Federation for Human Rights, had filed a complaint with the office of the prosecutor of the International Criminal Court, asking it to investigate the “systematic and widespread” abuse of thousands of civilians by the army and the police in their fight against organized crime.

On 26 August 2022, the Human Rights Watch reported that President Andrés Manuel López Obrador’s planned to formally transfer control of the National Guard—the main federal law enforcement agency charged with public security operations—from the Public Security Ministry to the Defense Ministry. This step posed a serious threat to human rights and transparency. The military, informally deployed for civilian law enforcement since 2006, has committed widespread human rights violations.

==== Domestic violence and rape along the U.S.-Mexico border ====
Many feminist scholars argue that rape and sexual assault is based on the power and dehumanization of women; sociologist Sylvanna Falcón argues that rape is one outcome of militarization of the border between the United States and Mexico. The militarization of this border is largely a product of the drug war and the occupation of the cartels in the northern part of Mexico along the Texan border, and has two main elements: integration of military units into the border region and making Border Patrol resemble the military via equipment, structure, and tactics. In terms of militarized border rape, a large number of women report that being raped was the price they needed to pay in order to cross the border without being deported or arrested, or to gain their documents back. Practices like these are unique in the border region. Women often decide not to prosecute their assailants because they would be prosecuting not only the individual, but also challenging a powerful and entrenched institutional system of social control.

Some factors that enable rape in a militarized border zone are the wide discretionary power that border enforcements have while performing their job, ineffective and misguided hiring which leads to inefficient and questionable staff members, the failure to enforce and abide by law enforcement standards, a lack of reporting on these crimes by other militarized border zone officials owing to a “code of silence,” and warlike characteristics being forced onto a geographic region that makes human rights violations easier to commit especially in an area of high militarization.

=== Massacres ===
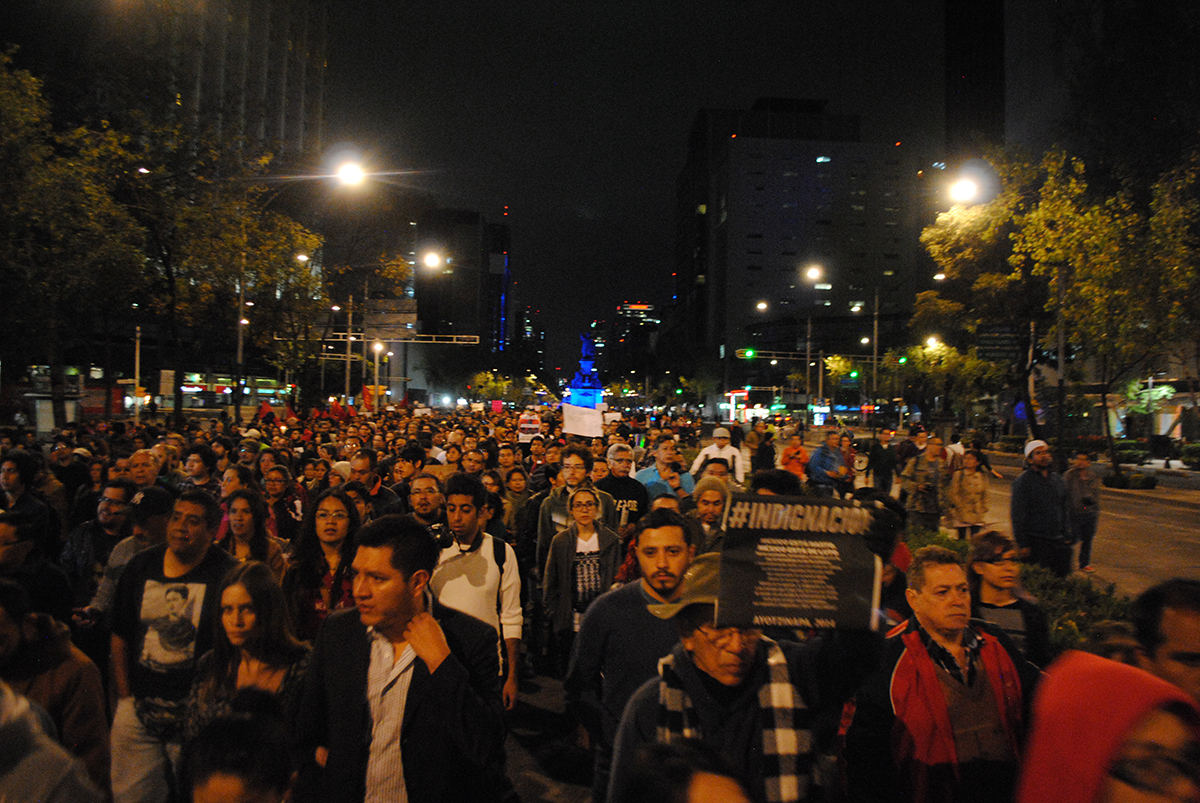
Protesters outside the Attorney General's office in Mexico City demanding the safe return of the 43 students who were forcibly disappeared in Iguala

Massacres have occurred in Mexican history. In recent years they've been related to the Mexican drug war, but also include prison riots, politically motivated massacres, and conflicts in regional areas. In December 1997, a group of heavily armed Mexican special forces soldiers kidnapped twenty young men in Ocotlan, Jalisco, brutally torturing them and killing one. Six of the implicated officers had received U.S. training as part of the Grupo Aeromóvil de Fuerzas Especiales (GAFE) training program.

==== Mass grave discoveries ====
The site known as the "ranch of horror" in Teuchitlan, Jalisco was initially believed to be a cartel-run "extermination camp" due to the discovery of human remains, bone fragments, and personal belongings like shoes and backpacks in March 2025. However, Mexico's security minister clarified that the location was actually a cartel training site where individuals who resisted recruitment were reportedly killed. The discovery came after an activist group found the ranch earlier that month, and the case had been mishandled by local authorities initially. Federal investigators later took over the investigation, revealing that recruits were lured through false job ads, and those who attempted to escape were tortured or killed. The ranch had been abandoned after an earlier probe in September 2024, but the true nature of the site became clear only after further investigation.

=== Female Homicide ===
Female homicide–also known as femicide, feminicide, feminicidios in Spanish–is a sex-based hate crime term, broadly defined as “the intentional killing of females (women or girls) because they are females,” or “generally as the murder of women for simply being women,” though definitions vary depending on the cultural context. The term femicide was coined in 1976 as a way to raise awareness of this phenomenon, and using this particular term has allowed for these deaths to be recognized and accentuated the differences between the killing of men and the killing of women so that femicides can be put at the forefront of public attention.

According to the World Health Organization, there are four different types of femicide: intimate femicide, murders in the name of ‘honor,’ dowry-related femicide, and non-intimate femicide. Intimate femicide, or femicide committed by a current or former male partner, is reported to be the cause of 35% of all murders of women globally. Murders in the name of ‘honor’ consist of a girl or woman being murdered by a family member for a sexual or behavioral transgression, assumed or actual. Dowry-related femicides occur when newly married women are murdered by their in-laws over arguments related to the dowry. Non-intimate femicides are the most common femicides committed in Ciudad Juárez. Non-intimate femicides are the murders of women committed by someone without an intimate relationship with the victim. Sometimes they are random, but often they are systemic.

Studies conducted by José Manuel Aburto, a research fellow in Italy, suggest that despite major improvements in mortality and health in Mexico, the effects of those improvements have been reversed overall because of an increase in homicide rates in the 2000s. Although the Seguro Popular de Salud program worked to provide universal health insurance to those who did not have it, a stark rise in homicides slowed life expectancy gains for women.

Female homicides have been a common sensation in Ciudad Juárez since 1993. As of February 27, 2005, the number of murdered women in Ciudad Juárez since 1993 is estimated to be more than 370. Literature notes that the victims are usually young factory workers who come from impoverished areas to seek employment in maquiladoras. Because these women come from impoverished backgrounds, they do not have the financial resources to avoid public transport and walking alone late at night in dangerous areas. A lot of victims also face sexual violence and dehumanization. Families of the victims of female homicide and other groups of activists have been working to advocate and bring attention to the issue. The Mexican Federal Parliament cooperated with UN Women to establish the Special Commission to Follow up on Femicide (CESF) which issued a comprehensive report on femicide and gender-based violence since Ciudad Juárez does not have an official data collection on femicides. This commission found that in 1995, 2000, and 2005 Ciudad Juárez had the third highest record of femicide in Mexico, and in 2010 the rate of femicides in the state of Chihuahua was 32.8 out of 100,000 women, which was the highest rate of femicide in the country. Scholar Marcela Lagarde y de los Ríos asserts that state and country security authorities fail to fulfill their sworn duties to prevent and punish the murder of women, and this creates an environment of impunity concerning female homicides. Dr. Howard Campbell, a professor of anthropology at the University of Texas at El Paso, argues that women at the top of the social structure may be empowered and liberated by participating in the drug trade, but notes that women at the bottom face considerable violence, stress, and anxiety while enjoying little of the benefits of participating in the drug trade. He also posits that drug smuggling tends to exacerbate female victimization, and that the drug trade being the generator of violence that it is should be given a greater consideration when discussing the Ciudad Juárez femicides.

=== Corruption ===
Corruption plagues the various levels of police and government institutions, and is frequently difficult to track down and prosecute since police officers and government officials may be protected by district attorneys, other members of the judiciary, or even businessmen. The problem is especially pronounced in northern border areas such as Tijuana, where police are engaged by drug traffickers to protect and enforce their illicit interests.

Many of the human rights violations discussed in this article are committed by Mexico's Armed Forces. The Mexican government allows the Armed Forces to play a large part in the drug war, despite the fact that the Mexican Constitution restricts the Armed Forces to functioning only connected to military discipline in peace times. The Armed Forces often respond to civilians with arbitrary arrests, personal agendas and corruption, extrajudicial executions, the use of torture and excessive force. Because these cases would be tried in military tribunals, there is limited legal and social accountability for these violations and a low rate of prosecution. Although the Mexican government has argued that the presence of the Armed Forces in areas where the drug war is most active will increase security in the country, it has not been proven that the government's reliance on the military has reversed this trend of insecurity. The Centro de Derechos Humanos reports a continued rise in drug-related killings in many regions of Mexico.

The Mexican police force often do not investigate crimes, and will either victimize the victims and harass them so they don't pursue legal action, or generally randomly select someone to be the guilty party (chivo expiatorio, scapegoat) then fabricate the evidence. This issue is a major problem throughout Mexico as many of the actual police force are the ones involved in the crimes or are trying to cover up their poor police work. Additionally, the Mexican police often extracts confessions and information through torture. In a 2021 survey conducted by Mexico’s national statistics office, 50% of incarcerated individuals said that they had suffered physical abuse from police and military personnel after they had been detained, and 38% of those who had confessed to a crime said that they only did so because they had been beaten or threatened by authorities. According to the National Torture Observatory, in 2022, there were 6226 criminal complaints of "torture, or cruel inhumane or degrading treatment" were issued to mexican authorities, of which only 82 resulted in criminal charges, and only 10 received a verdict. In 2023, the UN Working Group on Arbitrary Detention found that "arbitrary detention remains a widespread practice in Mexico and is too often the catalyst for ill-treatment, torture, enforced disappearance and arbitrary executions." Mexican law allows the arrest of suspects caught in the middle of a crime in a provision called "in flagrante", however it is often misused by authorities who plant drugs in "homes, vehicles, bags, or cloths" with the goal of detaining, questioning and torturing individuals while their lawyers are absent. For individuals accused of more than 12 categories of crime, Mexican judges are obligated to order a pre-trial incarceration, without taking the case's circumstances into account, thus violating international human rights standards.

== Human rights advocacy ==
- National Human Rights Commission (Mexico), Mexican government entity.
- Lydia Cacho, human rights activist.

=== Attacks on human rights advocates ===
- Digna Ochoa was a human rights lawyer who was murdered in 2001.
- On 26 April 2010, several human rights activists on their way to San Juan Copala, subject to a paramilitary blockade established since January, were ambushed by Ubisort-militia. Two were killed, and twelve are missing.

== See also ==
- 2006 civil unrest in San Salvador Atenco
- International child abduction in Mexico
- Internet in Mexico#Internet censorship
- Crime in Mexico
- Law of Mexico
- Law enforcement in Mexico
- List of journalists and media workers killed in Mexico
