= Heliodoro Díaz Escárraga =

Mexican politician (born 1951)

President of the Chamber of Deputies
- In office 1 September 2005 – 1 February 2006
- Preceded by: Manlio Fabio Beltrones
- Succeeded by: Marcela González Salas

Personal details
- Born: 17 December 1951 (age 74) Oaxaca, Oaxaca, Mexico
- Party: PRI
- Occupation: Politician

Heliodoro Carlos Díaz Escárraga (born 17 December 1951) is a Mexican politician from the Institutional Revolutionary Party (PRI).

He was elected to the Chamber of Deputies in the 2003 mid-term election to represent the sixth district of Oaxaca. During that term of office, he was the President of the Chamber of Deputies in 2005–2006. He resigned his seat on 10 July 2006 upon his appointment as secretary of government by Governor of Oaxaca Ulises Ruiz Ortiz.

He was re-elected to the Chamber in the 2009 mid-terms, once again for Oaxaca's sixth district.
