= Jaakkola =

Jaakkola is a Finnish surname. Notable people with the surname include:

- Anssi Jaakkola (born 1987), Finnish footballer
- Jalmari Jaakkola (1885–1964), Finnish historian
- Jyri Jaakkola (1977–2010), Finnish human rights activist
