= 2004 Oaxaca state election =

Local election in Mexico

The Mexican state of Oaxaca held an election on Sunday, 1 August 2004. At stake was the office of the Oaxaca State Governor, the unicameral Oaxaca State Congress, and 570 mayors and municipal councils.

== Governor ==
At the time of the election, the sitting governor was José Murat Casab of the Institutional Revolutionary Party (PRI).

Candidate	Party	Votes	%
Ulises Ruiz Ortiz	"Nueva Fuerza Oaxaqueña"; PRI, PVEM, PT	523,978	47.56
Gabino Cué Monteagudo	"Todos Somos Oaxaca"; PAN, PRD, CD	488,640	44.35
Héctor Sánchez López	"Unidad Popular"	44,347	4.02
Write-in candidates		3,254	0.30
spoil/blank votes		41,588	3.77
Totals		1,101,807	100.00

Source: IEEO

== On the same day ==
- 2004 Aguascalientes state election
- 2004 Baja California state election

== See also ==
- Politics of Mexico
- List of political parties in Mexico
