= La Revancha mine =

Baryte in Mexico

Ampliación La Revancha
- Location within Mexico Location within Chiapas
- Location: San Ramón village, Chicomuselo, Chiapas, Mexico; 15°47′N 92°49′W
- Products: Baryte
- Company: Blackfire Exploration
- Acquired: 2006

La Revancha mine, full name Ampliación La Revancha and often known as the Chicomuselo baryte mine is a baryte mine, located in Chicomuselo, in Chiapas, Mexico.

The mine located in North Americas largest baryte reserves.

The mine opened in 2007, and was met with opposition from the local community, led by activist Mariano Abarca, who was assassinated in 2009. The mine was closed shortly after the assassination, briefly opened after a court appeal and then closed in 2010, after federal court appeal. In 2023, activists reported that the mine reopened.

The mine is owned by Blackfire Exploration.

== Description ==
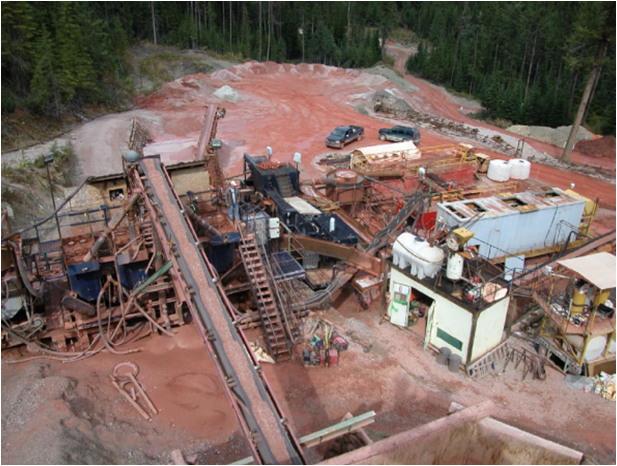
Barite crusher

The mine is located on North America's largest baryte deposit, located on a hill in the San Ramón village near Chicomuselo, Chiapas, Mexico. It is owned by Canadian company Blackfire Exploration.

== History ==
The deposit that the mine is on has been used to mine gold, copper and platinum for decades, before being operated by Caracol Mining Company from 2003 until 2006 to mine antimony and baryte.

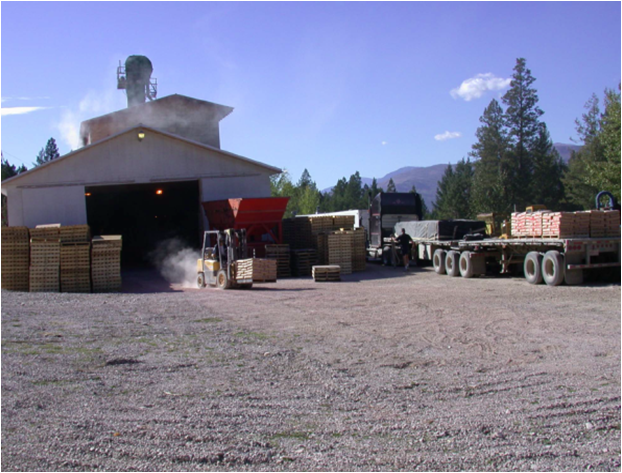
Barite grinding mill

Caracol Mining Company sold their assets to Blackfire Exploration Mexico, operated by brothers Brad and Brent Willis from Calgary. After their obtained permission to operate the mine, they named it La Revancha (English payback or revenge) and opened the mine in 2007. The opening of the mine was supported by some local community and met with opposition from others, including Román López Ramírez the president of the Grecia ejido. Ramírez accused the Government of Canada of pressuring Mexican authorities into providing social assistance to the community to appease them about the mine.

Community members blocked the road the project as part of protests against the mine. Protests were led by activist Mariano Abarca, who was threatened and beaten and assassinated in November 2009. Abarca had previously been assaulted by Blackfire Exploration staff.

The mine was forcibly closed by Mexican authorities on December 7, 2009 after it failed to meet environmental laws. Owners appealed, and a district judge reversed the closure in April 2010. After an appeal from the Chiapas Ministry of Environment, Housing and Natural History, the federal judiciary to reverse that decision, closing the mine again in October 2010.

In 2011, the Royal Canadian Mounted Police raided Blackfire Exploration's offices while investigating the payment of a bribe to a Chiapas state mayor. Three staff were arrested during the raid.

In January 2023, Avispa Mídia reported that mining activity resumed.

== See also ==
- List of mines in Mexico
