= Flavio Sosa =

Mexican politician (born 1964)

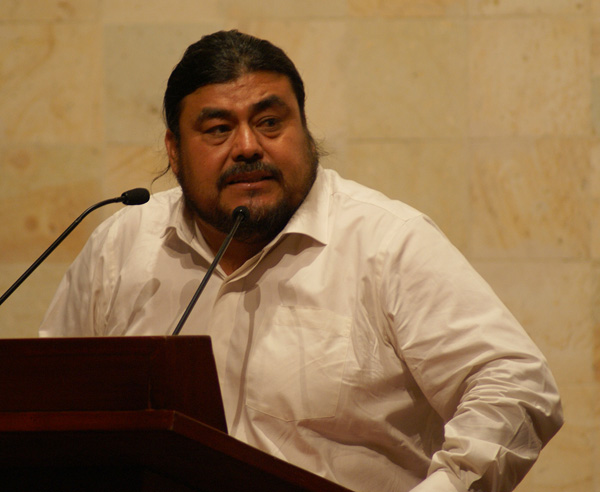
Flavio Sosa

Flavio Sosa Villavicencio (born 1964 in San Bartolo Coyotepec, Oaxaca), is a Mexican activist and a member of the provisional collective council of the Popular Assembly of the Peoples of Oaxaca (APPO).

== Political career ==
Sosa, a father of three, has been a notable leader in Mexico since 2001.

During the 2000 elections, his organization Nueva Izquierda de Oaxaca ("the New Left of Oaxaca") supported Vicente Fox (now ex-President).

Sosa was an activist with the Democratic Revolution Party (PRD) and the Popular Unity Party in Oaxaca. Sosa also worked with the Democratic Peasants Union (UCD), which was later integrated into the PRD.

Currently, Sosa is a member of the "provisional collective council" of APPO.

=== Role in 2006 Oaxaca protests ===
As a member of APPO, Sosa has been involved in the Oaxacan conflict from the beginning. On November 26, his office in the Oaxacan capital City was burned by paramilitaries and his brother Eric was detained and sent to a prison in Tamaulipas.

On December 4, 2006, Sosa was arrested on charges including kidnapping and destruction of property. Sosa was arrested in Mexico City along with two of his brothers Horacio and Ignacio Sosa, and Marcelino Coache. The four had traveled to Mexico's capital to speak out against government repression in the Mexican state of Oaxaca. Sosa has since been moved to a prison facility in Tamaulipas. While Sosa denounces the idea of leadership within the APPO, stating "ours is a movement of the grassroots, not leaders", he has become a prominent figure within the Oaxaca protests.

=== Recent Solidarity Actions ===
On Wed. January 16, 2008 Mexican prison authorities denied U.S. farm activists the right to see Flavio Sosa in prison. The eighteen U.S. farm activists from three states - Wisconsin, Kentucky, and Maine - were in Oaxaca, Mexico from January 10–17 as part of a solidarity delegation organized by Family Farm Defenders. This incident was publicly denounced by the FFD delegation at a press conference in Oaxaca City, which received coverage in Noticias, as well as upon their return to the U.S.

Sosa was released from prison on April 19, 2008 after a judge ruled there was insufficient evidence to continue holding him. He was not convicted of any crimes.

== See also ==
- Ulises Ruiz
- APPO
- 2006 Oaxaca protests
- Brad Will
