= Transmigrant =

Someone in transit through a country on the way to a final destination

Transmigrant is a term used to describe mobile subjects that create and sustain multiple social relations that link together their societies of origin and residence. These mobile subjects are now viewed as transnational migrants or transmigrants to distinguish them from migrants and immigrants.

== Immigrants and transmigrants ==
Traditionally, social scientists and researchers have understood migrants and immigrants to be persons that leave behind their native nation-state and experience the difficult processes of assimilation and incorporation into a foreign culture and society. Transmigrants engage in processes of transnationalism that span economic, cultural, social, ethnic, and national borders. Transmigrants living within a transnational social field are affected by "a set of social expectations, cultural values, and patterns of human interaction shaped by more than one social, economic, and political system."

Essential to the concept of transmigrant is the multiplicity of engagements that the mobile subject sustains in the home and host societies simultaneously. While a transmigrant may use the term "home" to refer to their country of origin, they also create a home (both physically and socially) in the host society. However, the word "host" often carries the unwarranted connotations that the migrant is a "welcomed visitor".

Transnational meshworks, or social fields, connect migrants and non-migrants across borders, thus actual migration is not necessary in order to be considered a transmigrant. "Non-migrants also adapt many of the values and practices of their migrant counterparts, engage in social relationships that span two settings, and participate in organizations that act across borders." An example of such can be seen in the Frente Indígena de Organízacíones Bínacíonales, which organizes migrants of different indigenous ethnic groups in Oaxaca City, in the Juxtlahuaca region of Oaxaca, in Tijuana, Baja California, and out of Fresno and Los Angeles, California. Many non-migrant members of such organizations participate in transnational social fields without ever having left their country of origin.

== Transmigrants and Identity Formation ==
Despite an era of new diasporas and capitalism, migrant populations continue to root their identities in the nation-state. As a result, both political leaders of sending nations and migrants residing abroad have come to imagine the nation-state as deterritorialized. The communities of origin no longer exist in one geographical place, but are spread throughout multiple sites and states. While the term transmigrant could be seen as suggesting a permanent state of being between two or more locations, some transmigrants may spend a large portion of their lives in this state of flux, others may live for long periods in one locality or another, and others may leave the sending community only one time, or never. Therefore the person gets to decide which they want to be.

In the past, the concept of nationality was derived from shared culture within a bounded territory. Emerging transmigrant communities have facilitated deterritorialization through the creation of a new conception of the nation-state. This conception also includes as citizens those who physically reside within the territories of multiple other states, but continue to engage politically, economically, socially and culturally in their countries of origin.

== Transmigrants and the Hegemonic Discourse ==
While transmigrants are influenced by hegemonic processes in living transborder lives where they straddle several nation-states, they actively challenge and contribute to these processes as well. In the host society, hegemonic social constructions such as race, ethnicity and nation structure the way that persons categorize transmigrants and the way that transmigrants experience and view their own social positions and identities. Transmigrants then transform these hegemonic social constructions via their responses and resistance to them. As transmigrants learn new meanings and forms of representation in their host societies, they simultaneously contribute to and participate in hegemonic constructions by “bringing them back home.”

Social remittances in the forms of social capital, ideas, and behaviors move both out of the community and into it, prompting the transmigrant as well as the sending country to experiment with ideas about politics, practices, and even gender relations. However, flows are not strictly “west to the rest” – in customizing, repurposing, and adapting ideas and identities from the host society to lives and social realities of the transmigrant, hegemony is actively contested.

== Transmigrants in Indonesia ==
There is another meaning of transmigrant and transmigration that is specific to the Southeast Asian nation of Indonesia. The transmigration programme, conceived while the latter was still the Dutch East Indies, has been moving landless individuals from over-populated islands such as Java to less crowded ones such as Sumatra. Indonesian transmigrants are typically Javanese and Madurese.

== Transmigrante ==
Transmigrantes are those bringing cargo overland from the United States through Mexico to Central America, as opposed to cargo that has Mexico as its final destination. This cargo often consists of used items, such as vehicles and appliances. Guatemala is the most common destination, with some cargo headed for Honduras and other Central American countries. The route through Mexico to the Guatemalan border at Ciudad Hidalgo is about 1,350 miles (2,170 km), virtually all two lane roads running through the centers of towns with heavy truck traffic during the day - a challenging journey even for an experienced transmigrante.
