= Ubisort =

Ubisort (span. Unión de Bienestar Social de la Región Triqui) is a paramilitary group in Oaxaca, Mexico affiliated with the Institutional Revolutionary Party (PRI) party.

In 2008 two women belonging to the Trique people were shot dead by the Ubisort militias in what is thought to be a government-funded attack.

On 26 April 2010 several human rights activists on their way to San Juan Copala planned by MULT, subject to a paramilitary blockade since January were ambushed by what is thought to have been Ubisort militia along with MULT militia as well. Two were killed, and twelve are missing. San Juan Copola had declared autonomy, which earned it the ire of the government.

The paramilitaries allowed police to remove two bodies from the area, identified as Alberta “Bety” Cariño, the director of CACTUS (Centro de Apoyo Comunitario Trabajando Unidos, a community organization in Oaxaca), and Jyri Jaakkola, an observer from Finland. The Oaxacan State Police in the area refuse to rescue the wounded "because they don't have orders to do so from the State."

== See also ==
- Movement of Trique Unification and Struggle
