= Chicomuselo =

Municipality of Chiapas, Mexico

- Municipality

- Location in Mexico
- Coordinates: 15°46′N 92°16′W
- Country: Mexico (de jure); Rebel Zapatista Autonomous Municipalities (Controlled by)
- State: Chiapas

Area
  - Total: 403 sq mi (1,043 km^{2})

Population (2010)
  - Total: 31,515

Chicomuselo is a municipality in the Mexican state of Chiapas, and also the name of the municipality's largest settlement and the seat of the municipal government. The municipality has an area of 1,043 km^{2} (403 sq mi).

As of 2010, the municipality had a total population of 31,515.

As of 2010, the town of Chicomuselo had a population of 5,938. Other than the town of Chicomuselo, the municipality had 272 localities, the largest of which (with 2010 populations in parentheses) were: Pablo L. Sidar (3,070), classified as urban, and Unión Buenavista (1,600), Lázaro Cárdenas (1,321), Piedra Labrada (1,115), and Nueva América (1,057), classified as rural.

Chicomuselo is currently suffering the exploitation of land in the hands of the Blackfire exploration LTD a mining company from Canada. url=https://www.blackfireexploration.com/ On July 31, 2019, the Canadian government denied that its embassy in Mexico had anything to do with the coverup of the 2009 murder of activist Mariano Abarca, reportedly at the hands of the Blackfire Exploration. Family members vow to continue the struggle.

On 12-13 May 2024, 11 members of the same family were killed in a massacre by the Jalisco New Generation Cartel.

== See also ==
- Municipalities of Chiapas
