= Mariano Abarca =

Mexican community activist (1958–2009)

- Abarca in Chicomuselo, August 2009
- Born: 1958
- Died: 27 November 2009 (aged 50–51); Chicomuselo, Chiapas, Mexico
- Cause of death: Assassination
- Organization: Mexican Network of People Affected by Mining
- Known for: Protecting against mining

Mariano Abarca Roblero (1958–2009) was a community activist known for leading opposition against mining by Blackfire Exploration in his community of Chicomuselo in the state of Chiapas in Southern Mexico.

He was assassinated on November 27, 2009. He was married, having two sons and his two daughters.

== Career and activism ==
Abarca operated a small restaurant in Chicomuselo and led the Mexican Network of People Affected by Mining organization.

Abarca led community protests against mining by Canadian mining company Blackfire Exploration that, since 2007, operated the La Revancha (baryte) mine in Chiapas. In 2008, he was assaulted by Blackfire Exploration staff.

== Assassination ==
Abarca was assassinated on the night of November 27, 2009 in Chicomuselo in front of his house. He was shot in the head and chest by a man on a motorcycle who was allegedly a Blackfire employee.

Abarca had previously been abducted in August 2009, and again received death threats in the week and had filed a complaint against the company one day prior to his death.

Witnesses identified a Blackfire Exploration contractor as the assassin "according to a report sponsored by labor and environmental advocacy organizations".

== Aftermath ==
Three suspects were arrested in connection with Abarca's death, each of them had been employed by Blackfire Exploration at some time.

On July 31, 2019, the Canadian government denied that its embassy in Mexico had anything to do with the coverup of the 2009 his murder. Family members vow to continue the struggle.

In 2021, after the Canadian federal ombudsman refused to investigate his death, Roblero's family appealed to the Federal Court of Appeal. In 2023, with help from the Justice & Corporate Accountability Project, his family escalated the matter to the Inter-American Commission on Human Rights.

== See also ==
- Alberta Cariño
