= Chicomuselo massacre =

Massacre in Mexico

- Part of Mexican drug war
- Location: Nuevo Morelia, Chicomuselo, Chiapas, Mexico
- Date: 12–13 May 2024
- Deaths: 11 killed
- Perpetrator: Jalisco New Generation Cartel

The Chicomuselo massacre was a massacre of 11 civilians of the same family in Nuevo Morelia, Chicomuselo, Chiapas, Mexico, during a turf war between the Sinaloa Cartel and the Jalisco New Generation Cartel.

Five men, five women and a 15-year-old boy were killed in the massacre. The home was subsequently torched. The victims had refused to work for local criminal groups and protested against local illegal mining.

== Victims ==
- Alfonzo, 73
- Tere, 28
- Dolores, 56
- Rosalinda, 57
- Yojari, 18
- Ignacio, 52
- Isidra, 54
- Urbano, 42
- Brandi, 15
- Azael, 31
- Father Marcelo

== Investigation ==
Authorities began investigating on 14 May 2025 to find those responsible. The Interinstitutional Group headed by the State Attorney General's Office (FGE) carried out the removal of bodies and identification of corpses.

== Aftermath ==
In the anniversary of the massacre, about 2000 people lead a pilgrimage to the cemetery where the family were buried.
