= Jyri Jaakkola =

Finnish human rights activist

Jyri Antero Jaakkola
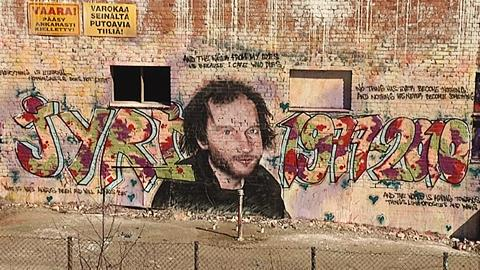
- Jyri Jaakkola graffiti
- Born: February 11, 1977; Joensuu, Finland
- Died: April 27, 2010 (aged 33); Oaxaca, Mexico
- Known for: Human rights activism, advocacy

Jyri Antero Jaakkola (February 11, 1977 – April 27, 2010) was a Finnish human rights activist. He was on his way to San Juan Copala, a village of indigenous Trique people that has declared itself autonomous, as a human rights observer when he was shot dead by UBISORT, a paramilitary organization connected to Institutional Revolutionary Party. In the attack Alberta Cariño, an activist for the local organization CACTUS, was also shot dead and more than ten people were wounded.

== Background ==
Jaakkola was widely known as a central figure in several alternative movements in Finland. He was involved with S/V Estelle, a sailboat operated on fair trade principles, and sailed to Angola with the ship in 2002.

== Death ==
Jaakkola was murdered in Oaxaca on 27 April 2010. According to Member of the European Parliament Heidi Hautala (Subcommittee on Human Rights) the individual cases allow the discovery of the roots of systematic human rights violations.

Jaakkola's parents want the Finnish government to conduct investigations. In 2012, two years after his death, the Mexican investigation had not advanced. In September 2022, four of ten arrested suspects were set free; the case was declared as finished due to the lack of proof.

== See also ==
- San Juan Copala
- Autonomous Municipality of San Juan Copala
