= Rosa Elia Romero Guzmán =

Mexican politician

- Born: 14 May 1973 (age 53); Huajuapan de León, Oaxaca, Mexico
- Occupation: Deputy
- Political party: PT

Rosa Elia Romero Guzmán (born 14 May 1973) is a Mexican politician affiliated with the Labor Party (PT) who formerly belonged to the Party of the Democratic Revolution (PRD). She was elected to the Chamber of Deputies to represent the sixth district of Oaxaca for the PT in the 2006 general election and again in the 2012 general election.
