= Irma Piñeyro Arias =

Mexican politician

- Born: 26 September 1954 (age 71); Tlaxiaco, Oaxaca, Mexico
- Occupation: Politician
- Political party: PRI

Antonia Irma Piñeyro Arias (born 26 September 1954) is a Mexican politician from the Institutional Revolutionary Party (PRI). She has served in the Chamber of Deputies on three occasions:

- During the 55th session of Congress (1994–1997), for Oaxaca's 7th district
- During the 58th session (2000–2003), for Oaxaca's 6th district
- During the 60th session (2006–2009), as a plurinominal deputy for the third region.
