= Statue of Benito Juárez (Fresno) =

Statue by Ernesto Tamariz in San Diego, California, U.S.

Benito Juárez
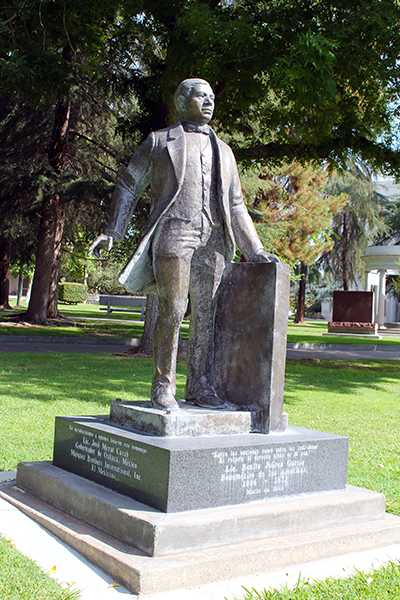
- Year: 2003
- Medium: Bronze sculpture
- Subject: Benito Juárez
- Location: Courthouse Park, Fresno, California

The Statue of Benito Juárez is a bronze sculpture in Fresno, California, located in Courthouse Park, honoring Mexican President Benito Juárez. It was gifted to the people of Fresno by José Murat Casab, then serving as Governor of Oaxaca.

== History ==
The idea for the monument to Benito Juárez came from the Oaxacan community of Fresno. Oralia Maceda and her husband Rufino Domínguez, then coordinator of the Frente Indígena de Organizaciones Binacionales (Spanish for "Indigenous Front of Binational Organizations"), partnered with the Centro Binacional para El Desarrollo Indígena Oaxaqueño ("Binational Center for Oaxacan Indigenous Development") to secure funding and permits to erect the statue in Fresno. Fresno County Supervisor Juan Arámbula submitted a proposal to Fresno County Board of Supervisors for the monument to be erected in Courthouse Park, which passed unanimously.

The bronze sculpture was gifted to the people of Fresno by then Governor of Oaxaca José Murat Casab and erected in March 2003.

Celebrations in honor of Juárez's birthday are held at the statue.

== Inscription ==
At the base of the statue, an inscription in Spanish reads:

"Entre las naciones como entre los individuos

El respeto al derecho ajeno es la paz.”

Lic. Benito Juárez García
Benemérito de las Américas
1806 - 1872
Marzo de 2003

== See also ==
- Statue of Benito Juárez (San Diego)
