= Alberta Cariño =

Mexican community activist

- Died: April 27, 2010
- Citizenship: Mexican
- Organization: Mexican Network of People Affected by Mining
- Known for: Human rights work

Alberta "Bety" Cariño Trujillo was a Mexican human rights defender who was murdered on April 27, 2010.

== Activism ==
Cariño was the director of the Centro de Apoyo Comunitario Trabajando Unidos (CACTUS) community organization, based in Oaxaca, Mexico.

Cariño was Mixtec and an advocate for food sovereignty, community water management, soil conservation and the right to autonomy for indigenous peoples in Mexico. As part of her work with CACTUS, she worked to organize women's collectives in northern Oaxaca. She was one of the leaders of CACTUS forced to temporarily flee Oaxaca in December 2006 after government repression in response to the 2006 Oaxaca protests.

Cariño and Mariano Abarca (assassinated in 2009) co-founded the Mexican Network of People Affected by Mining in 2008.

== Murder ==
On April 27, 2010, she was killed when paramilitaries ambushed a caravan on its way to the indigenous autonomous community of San Juan Copala. The caravan, including local and international human rights observers, was delivering food to the community which has been under a blockade from paramilitaries allied with the state government. The gunmen also killed Jyri Jaakkola, a Finnish human rights activist, and more than ten people were wounded.

== See also ==
- Mariano Abarca
