= Ship to Gaza (Sweden) =

Swedish humanitarian organisation

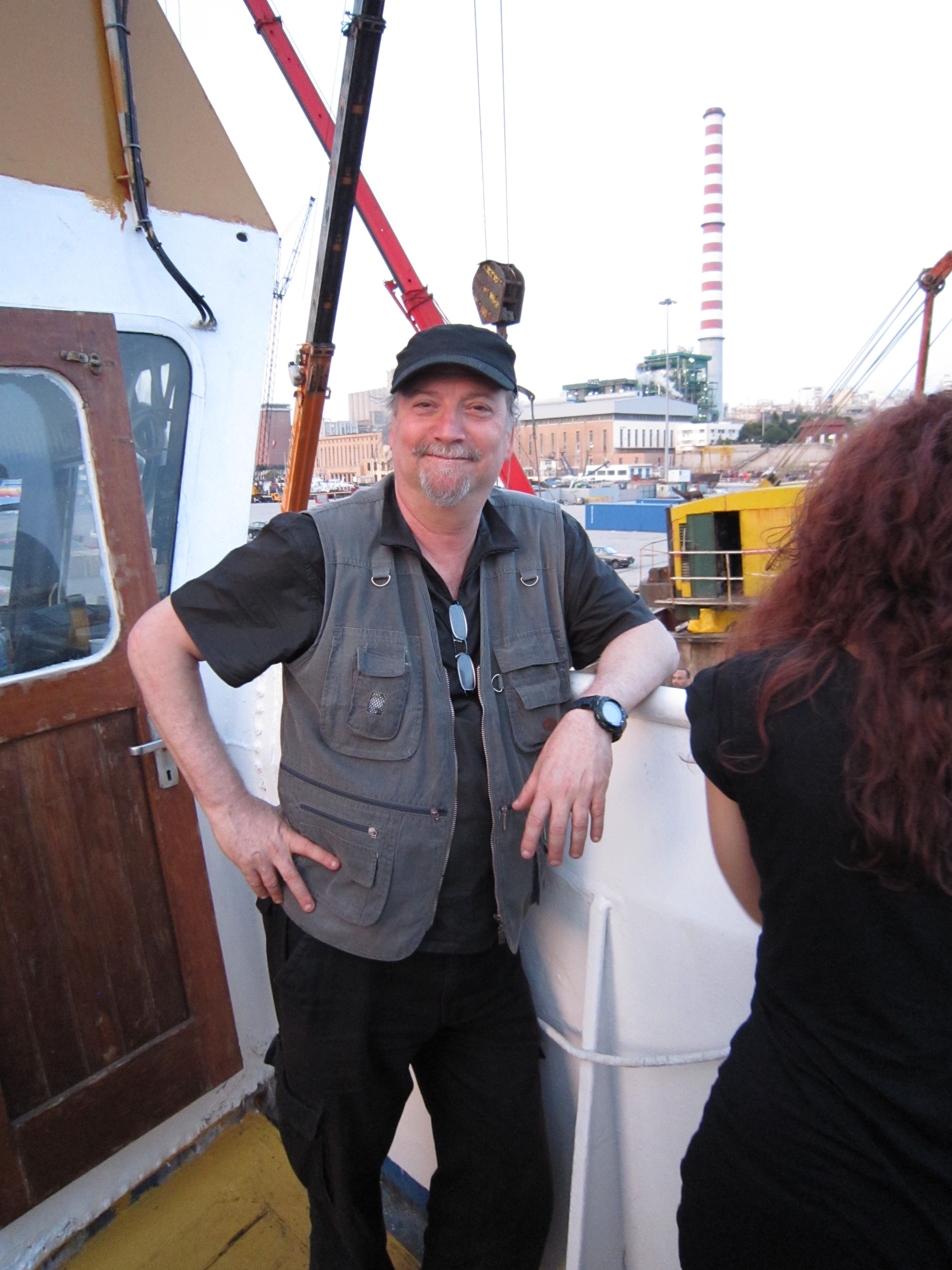
Dror Feiler onboard MV Sofia

Ship to Gaza is a Swedish organization that aims to break the blockade of the Gaza Strip by delivering humanitarian aid from Scandinavia to Gaza.

== 2010 ==
In 2010 the MV Sofia sailed to Gaza.

== 2012 ==
In 2012 the SV Estelle sailed to Gaza.

The 30 activists sailing on the vessel were detained by the Israelis and taken to the Gibon detention centre in Israel. The Israel Defense Forces announced that the goods were delivered to the United Nations Relief and Works Agency for Palestine Refugees in the Near East in the Near East (UNRWA). The cargo did not include supplies forbidden by Israel.

A Finn on board, Veli-Matti Koivisto, said that Israeli forces used electroshock weapons when they boarded the ship. Israeli military boarded the vessel in international waters. Israeli authorities have said that they acted peacefully. The IDF found carrier pigeons with "digital tags" attached to their legs containing photos of the Israeli military seizing the Estelle. Photos brought home by pigeons could be distributed to global media. A Palestinian activist confirmed the IDF assessment and stated the photos were of "IDF soldiers using taser guns."

== See also ==
- 2010 Gaza flotilla raid
  - Legal assessments of the Gaza flotilla raid
  - Reactions to the Gaza flotilla raid
- Blockade of the Gaza Strip
- Freedom Flotilla III
- Freedom Flotilla Coalition
