= Gabino Cué Monteagudo =

Mexican politician

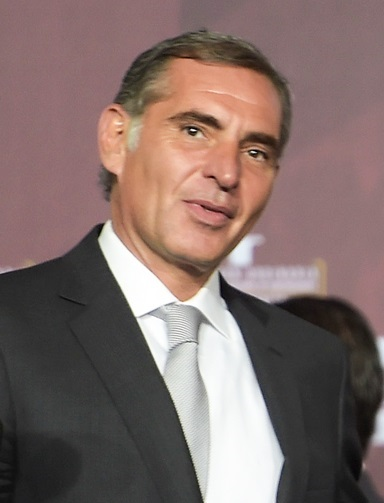

Governor of Oaxaca
- In office 1 December 2010 – 30 December 2016
- Preceded by: Ulises Ruiz Ortiz
- Succeeded by: Alejandro Murat Hinojosa

President of the National Conference of Governors
- In office 1 March 2016 – 18 November 2016
- Preceded by: Eruviel Ávila Villegas
- Succeeded by: Graco Ramírez

Senator of the Congress of the Union for Oaxaca First Formule
- In office 1 September 2006 – 1 February 2010
- Preceded by: Miguel Sadot Snachez
- Succeeded by: Ericel Gómez Nucameni

Personal details
- Born: 23 February 1966 (age 60) Oaxaca de Juárez, Oaxaca, Mexico
- Party: Citizen's Movement
- Education: Monterrey Institute of Technology and Higher Education
- Occupation: Politician
- Website: http://www.gabinocue.org/

Gabino Cué Monteagudo (born February 23, 1966, in Oaxaca de Juárez, Oaxaca, Mexico) is a Mexican politician. He was previously governor of the state of Oaxaca, and the first non-PRI winning candidate in the state in 80 years. He previously ran for governor in 2004, losing to Ulises Ruiz Ortiz, the PRI-candidate and current outgoing state governor.

Cue has also served as mayor of the state's capital city, Oaxaca de Juárez, and represented the state as a senator in the Mexican Congress.

== See also ==
- 2004 Oaxaca state election
- Mexican gubernatorial elections, 2010

| Preceded by Ulises Ruiz Ortiz | Governor of Oaxaca; 2010 — 2016 | Succeeded by Alejandro Murat Hinojosa |
