= Avispa Mídia =

Latin American journalism collective

- Founded: 2014/2015
- Country of origin: Brazil
- Area served: Latin America
- Editor: Aldo Santiago
- Services: Investigative Journalism
- Website: avispa.org/en/

Avispa Mídia is an independent journalism collective, reporting on corporate activity, criminality and equity issues in Mexico and Central America.

== Organisation ==
Avispa Mídia translates into English as Wasp Media, and is a Mexican website that reports on land rights, exploitation, organised crime, paramilitary activities and extractive industries in Central America and Mexico. It is operated by researches and journalists. The website is edited by Aldo Santiago.

== History ==
Avispa Mídia is a collective that started in Brazil towards the end of 2014, and the start of 2015, in the aftermath of the Iguala mass kidnapping. Contributors to the website are located throughout the Americas, but mostly in Mexico.

In 2018, Avispa Mídia was shortlisted for an Index on Censorship Freedom of Expression award.
