= Jorge Ortiz Alvarado =

Mexican politician

- Born: 10 February 1982 (age 44); Mexico City, Mexico
- Occupation: Politician
- Political party: PRI

Jorge Ortiz Alvarado (born 10 February 1982) is a Mexican politician affiliated with the Institutional Revolutionary Party. As of 2014 he served as Deputy of the LIX Legislature of the Mexican Congress as a plurinominal representative.
