= 2006 Oaxaca rebellion =

Civil conflict in Oaxaca, Mexico

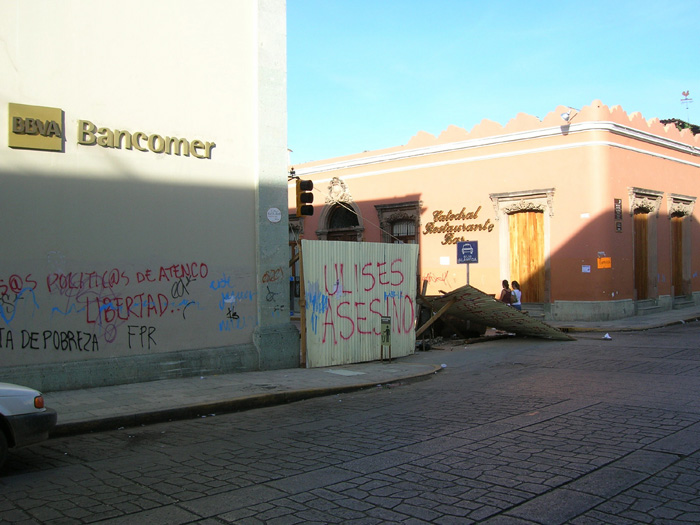
- APPO barricade and graffiti in central Oaxaca, June 2006
- Date: May–November 2006
- Location: Oaxaca, Mexico; 17.0732°N 96.7266°W
- Caused by: Low funding for teachers and rural schools; Police attack on striking teachers on 14 June 2006; Allegations of political corruption against Governor Ulises Ruiz Ortiz
- Goals: Resignation or removal of Governor Ulises Ruiz Ortiz; Improved funding for education; Release of political prisoners
- Methods: Strikes; Sit-ins and encampments; Barricades; Occupation of radio and television stations; Mass marches
- Result: Protests suppressed by federal police; Governor Ruiz completed term

Parties
Popular Assembly of the Peoples of Oaxaca (APPO); Oaxaca teachers' union (Sección 22); Student groups	Oaxaca state government; Federal Preventive Police (PFP); State and local police

Lead figures
Flavio Sosa; Enrique Rueda Pacheco (teachers' union)	Ulises Ruiz Ortiz (governor); Vicente Fox (president); Ardelio Vargas (PFP chief)

Casualties
- Death: At least 17–27
- Injuries: Hundreds
- Arrested: Over 160

The Mexican state of Oaxaca was embroiled in a conflict that lasted more than seven months and resulted in at least seventeen deaths and the occupation of the capital city of Oaxaca by the Popular Assembly of the Peoples of Oaxaca (APPO). The conflict emerged in May 2006 with the police responding to a strike involving the local teachers' trade union by opening fire on non-violent protests. It then grew into a broad-based movement pitting the Popular Assembly of the Peoples of Oaxaca (APPO) against the state's governor, Ulises Ruiz Ortiz. Protesters demanded the removal or resignation of Ortiz, whom they accused of political corruption and acts of repression. Multiple reports, including from international human rights monitors, accused the Mexican government of using death squads, summary executions, and even violating Geneva Conventions standards that prohibit attacking and shooting at unarmed medics attending to the wounded. One human rights observer claimed over twenty-seven were killed by the police violence. The dead included Brad Will, Emilio Alonso Fabián, José Alberto López Bernal, Fidel Sánchez García, and Esteban Zurita López.

Despite the intensity of the protests, Governor Ulises Ruiz refused to step down. The Federal Government, headed by then-president Vicente Fox, deployed officers from the Federal Preventive Police (PFP) in October 2006 to retake the city of Oaxaca.

== Organisation ==
After the police fired on non-violent protesters, the teachers' union fought back and was able to force the police out of the city and establish a citywide anarchist community for several months. The teachers' union and other workers' and community groups form the APPO, which created large democratic assemblies for citizens.

According to one activist who helped to found the APPO:

So the APPO was formed to address the abuses and create an alternative. It was to be a space for discussion, reflection, analysis, and action. We recognized that it shouldn't be just one organization, but rather a blanket coordinating body for many different groups. That is, not one ideology would prevail; we would focus on finding the common ground among diverse social actors. Students, teachers, anarchists, Marxists, churchgoers — everyone was invited.

The APPO was born without a formal structure, but soon developed impressive organizational capacity. Decisions in the APPO are made by consensus within the general assembly, which was privileged as a decision-making body. In the first few weeks of our existence we created the APPO State Council. The council was originally composed of 260 people — approximately ten representatives from each of Oaxaca's seven regions and representatives from Oaxaca's urban neighborhoods and municipalities.

The Provisional Coordination was created to facilitate the operation of the APPO through different commissions. A variety of commissions were established: judicial, finance, communications, human rights, gender equity, defense of natural resources, and many more. Proposals are generated in smaller assemblies of each sector of the APPO and then brought to the general assembly where they are debated further or ratified.

There was deep tension in the group between the more radical and libertarian elements who rejected representative democracy and wanted to create a permanent self-organised society against the more conservative and moderate elements who wanted elections. Ultimately, the radicals were more successful, and most of the population boycotted the elections. The APPO was also able to organise festivals, defensive measures, radio stations and a neighbourhood watch. The festivals, the 'Guelaguetza', thousands of people attended for free to see indigenous culture, dress, and dancing, whilst graffiti artists packed the streets and covered the walls of the towns with anti-government and anti-capitalist messages. The APPO also used 'topiles' to maintain the peace. These were neighbourhood watches that also doubled as a militia which fought off government soldiers often with little more than rocks and fireworks. If a criminal were found disturbing someone, a bell would be rung to alert the nearest topile, who would either issue a minor fine or perhaps hold them for the night. The topiles were successful in organising first aid centres and garbage collection.

== Rebellion ==
=== May and June 2006 ===
In May 2006, a teachers' strike began in the Zócalo in the Mexican city of Oaxaca. 2006 was the 25th consecutive year that Oaxaca's teachers had gone on strike. Previously, the protests had generally lasted for one to two weeks and resulted in small raises for teachers. The 2006 strike began in protest of the low funding for teachers and rural schools in the state, but also called for the resignation of the state governor Ulises Ruiz Ortiz after 3000 police were sent to break up the occupation in the early morning of 14 June 2006. A street battle lasted for several hours that day, resulting in more than one hundred hospitalisations but no fatalities. Ortiz declared that he would not resign.

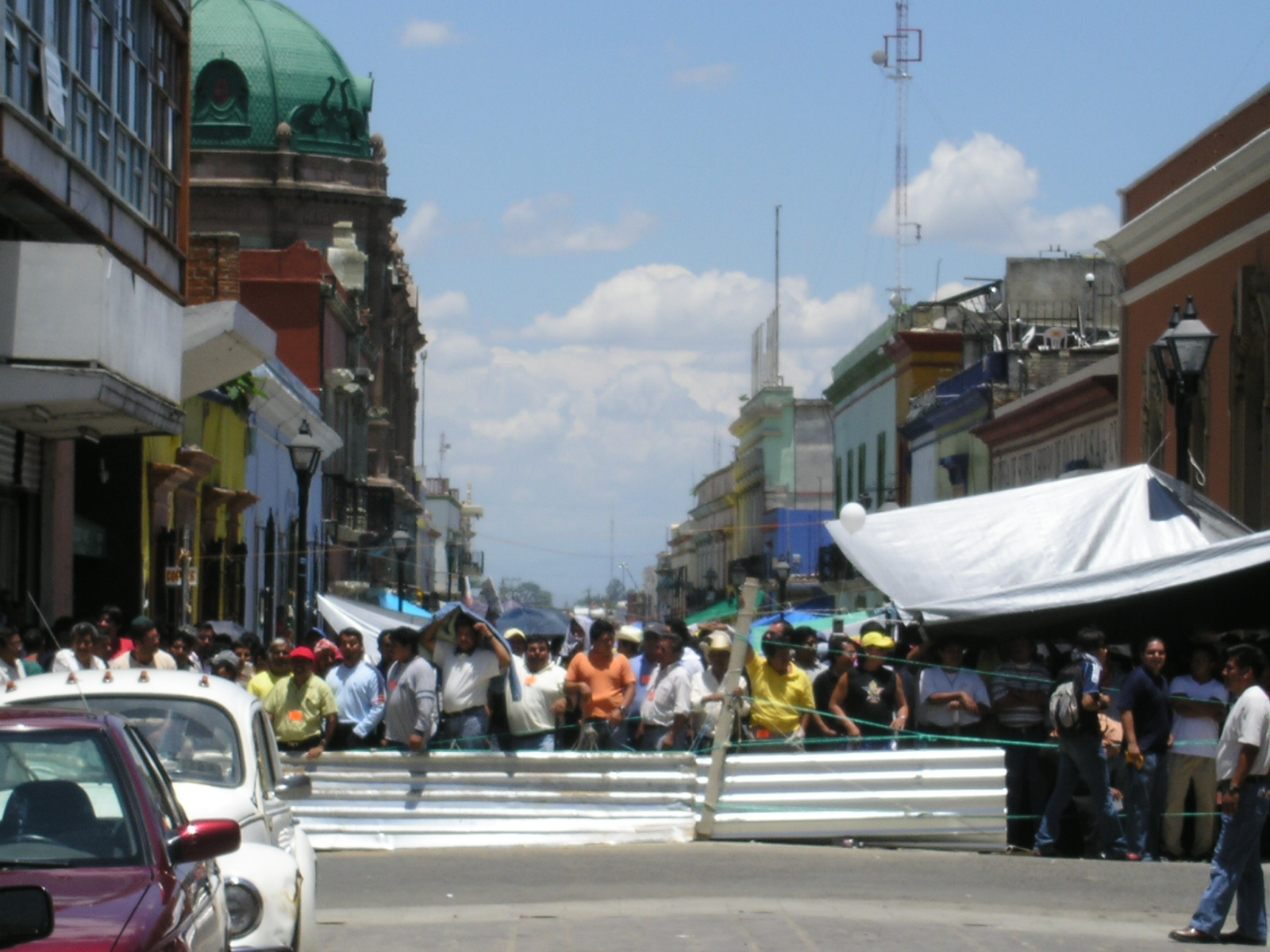
Protests in Oaxaca City centre on 22 June 2006.

In response to the events of 14 June, representatives of Oaxaca's state regions and municipalities, unions, non-governmental organizations, social organizations, cooperatives, and parents convened to form the Popular Assembly of the Peoples of Oaxaca (APPO, from its Spanish name, Asamblea Popular de los Pueblos de Oaxaca). On 17 June, APPO reestablished encampments in the zócalo and declared itself the governing body of Oaxaca, plunging the city into a state of civil rebellion. Barricades were erected across some streets to prevent further police raids. APPO began seeking nationwide solidarity with its movement and urged other states in Mexico to organize popular assemblies at every level of social organization: neighborhoods, street blocks, unions, and towns. Various municipality offices across the state closed in unity. A popular mantra was, "No leader is going to solve our problems".

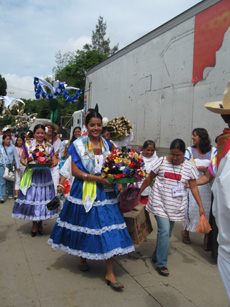
Popular Guelaguetza organized by protesters.

Though APPO did not boycott the Mexican national elections on 2 July, Ulises Ruiz's Institutional Revolutionary Party (PRI) suffered an electoral defeat in Oaxaca, a state they had ruled for seventy years.

APPO did agree to boycott the annual Guelaguetza festival in the final weeks of July. Protesters blocked access to the auditorium where the festival is held, using burned buses and other debris, preventing the completion of renovations to the facility. This action drew criticism due to the damage some individuals caused to the auditorium by starting fires and spray-painting graffiti. Some of the graffiti said: "Tourists, go home! In Oaxaca, we are not capitalists". As a result of the boycott, the government cancelled the festival celebration – in its place, the APPO held an alternative cultural festival over several days.

The action marked the lowest point of government for Ulises Ruiz, who subsequently left the State. He resided in Mexico City for a few months.

After a few weeks of absence, the APPO assumed control of the city and started implementing its own law, while confrontations with State Police escalated.

=== August 2006 ===
On 1 August, APPO began its takeover of television and radio stations throughout the city. While all of these stations are no longer occupied by APPO members, the radio has remained an important facet of the movement. APPO utilized the radio resources to communicate about possible threats from police and armed gangs, demand the removal of Ulises Ruiz, and the release of political prisoners. During APPO's illegal occupation of the radio stations, pro-PRI and PRI-funded groups engaged in frequent late-night armed attacks on APPO-controlled radio stations and damaged their broadcasting equipment.

Those attacks on the APPO-controlled radio stations represented an escalation of violence in a conflict that (despite constant rumors of threats) had remained relatively peaceful since the 14 June police raid. In what was called a "cleanup operation", armed groups of men attacked the APPO's barricades during the nights. The individuals involved were identified as members of pro-PRI organizations and as plain-clothes local police. These attacks, combined with other shootings and assassinations, resulted in the first deaths associated with the conflict, in which six APPO supporters were killed.

=== September 2006 ===
On 14 September, striking teachers and APPO members took over the municipal building in Huautla de Jiménez, located in the Sierra Mazateca in northern Oaxaca. They retained control of the building until mid-January 2007 (months after the government regained control of Oaxaca City), when Oaxacan state police briefly occupied the city, patrolling the streets with large guns and guarding the municipio all hours of the day and night.

The leader of Mazatecan APPO, Agustín Sosa, was elected mayor (presidente) of Huautla de Jiménez in November 2007, to a term beginning in January 2008. Sosa is a longtime activist who spent many months in jail in 2004, accused of murder in the death of a protester (at the hands of the police) at a protest organized by Sosa. He bears no relation to Flavio Sosa, the still imprisoned leader of APPO.

=== October 2006 ===
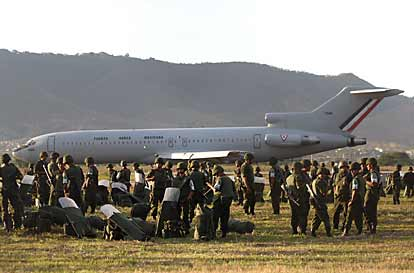
Mexican Armed Forces assemble near the airport in Oaxaca.

On 27 October 2006, Bradley Roland Will, a U.S. Indymedia journalist from New York who had entered the country under a tourist visa, was killed along with Professor Emilio Alonso Fabián and Esteban López Zurita, in what the Associated Press has claimed was a "shootout" between protesters and a group of armed men. Photographs by Brad Will, however, demonstrate that the protesters were throwing rocks at the gunman. Photographs of Will, after he was shot, show a man lying on the ground, surrounded by friends, and not the "armed gangs" that the Associated Press has reported. An autopsy by the Mexican government has concluded that "two shots" were fired at Will, one from in front and one from behind (which, the government alleges, was fired by a protester). The body was never examined for blood clotting in the second wound, which would have demonstrated that it was "implemented" in the morgue. Brad Will's body was cremated. The family of Brad Will visited Mexico to demand justice from the court system, and upon hearing the accusation that their son was shot at close range by a protester, they called it "ridiculous, false, without substance, biased, and unconvincing." They also accused the District Attorney of falsifying evidence and acting in bad faith.

However, protesters claim the shooting was by a group of armed men against unarmed protesters. Oswaldo Ramírez, a photographer for Mexico City daily Milenio, was also shot in the foot. Lizbeth Cana, attorney general of Oaxaca, claims the shooting of the protesters was provoked by the protesters themselves and that the armed men who engaged them were upset residents from the area. The U.S. ambassador to Mexico, Tony Garza, however, claims the men may have been local police. El Universal has identified some of the men as local officials. Protesters also allege that the men were police and not local residents. Indymedia claims from a first-hand witness that the man who shot Will was an "urban paramilitary" member of the Institutional Revolutionary Party. A local news organisation, Centro de Medios Libres, claims that from Will's recovered videotapes, they have found that Pedro Carmona, a paramilitary who was the mayor of Felipe Carrillo Puerto in Santa Lucía del Camino, was the person who shot Bradley Roland Will. Another shooting took place later in the day outside the state prosecutor's office, leading to three injuries.

An Associated Press report by Rebeca Romero (11 December 2006, 12:33 am (ET)) claims, "Most of the nine victims of the Oaxaca violence have been protesters who were shot by armed gangs..." One protester, in response to the massive denunciations of the state-controlled media, has said, "I saw a young boy shot in the leg, friends around me arrested left and right, bullets flying everywhere. The government needed someone to blame, and it fell heaviest on the people at the barricades, especially strategic ones like Cinco Senores. They called us vandals and thieves and delinquents."

The death of Bradley Roland Will prompted President Vicente Fox to send federal police to Oaxaca after months of attempting to stay neutral in what he considered a local issue.

==== 29–30 October ====
"Notice of the CCRI from October 30th, 2006"
An audio language translation of a communiqué critical of Mexico's government officials and in support of the protests.

At least two protesters, Social Security Institute workers Roberto López Hernández and nurse and APPO safety commission member Jorge Alberto Beltrán, were killed when about 3,500 federal police and 3000 military police removed protesters in downtown Oaxaca's Zócalo, with a backup of 5,000 army troops waiting just outside the city. The police forces were met with resistance from protesters and Radio APPO reported police raids (which were denied by the federal government) on activists' homes, helicopters dropped chemical grenades (apparently tear gas) on protesters who had been pushed from the Zócalo. There were multiple unconfirmed reports of a young teenager, but rather a twelve-year-old child, shot in the streets near Puente Tecnológico; the boy's body was reportedly taken by police. There have been some deaths, according to local media, and while the APPO claims 'dozens' of deaths, the exact number is yet unknown. Protests continued, with sporadic clashes around the Zócalo, which is under Federal forces' control.

Numerous people have been detained; footage shows at least four being removed in a PFP Mi-17 helicopter.

The Mexican Episcopate Conference, an organization of the Catholic Church, supported the Federal Police's intervention in the conflict.

On 30 October 2006, the Revolutionary Indigenous Clandestine Committee (CCRI) issued a notice condemning the government tactics and the killings, including that of a minor; through the communiqué, the EZLN indicated a four-point response, which included the closing of some highways in the southeast state of Chiapas, and their vocal support to the people of Oaxaca.

=== November 2006 ===
An open letter written "to honor the memory" of slain journalist Brad Will and support "the Oaxacan people's efforts to establish a popular government that recognizes local traditions and values", was signed in early November by numerous academics and activists, including Noam Chomsky, Naomi Klein, Michael Moore, Arundhati Roy, Starhawk and Howard Zinn.

==== 2 November 2006 ====
Federal Preventative Police advanced on the Benito Juárez Autonomous University of Oaxaca, occupied by students and displaced protesters from the Zocalo. Since the university is autonomous, the police are forbidden from entering the grounds, unless invited by the Rector.

Thousands of protesters arrived in the following hours, surrounding the police and eventually forcing them to withdraw from the area surrounding the university. The APPO has also received permission from the university rector, through threats of violence, to broadcast its messages on the university radio, which it has used to criticise political parties, specifically the PRI. Opinions against the APPO are quickly taken off the air.

After criticism by the private sector, political organizations and the press (specifically Grupo Formula's news anchor Denise Maerker) for his remarks towards the APPO the rector declared that he had requested respect for the rights of students and faculty and that a tentative operation by the Federal Police would not be a solution to the issue.

==== 6 November 2006 ====
Three explosions in Mexico City destroyed a Scotiabank branch lobby, blew out windows at Mexico's Tribunal Federal Electoral (Federal Electoral Tribunal), and damaged the auditorium at PRI headquarters. Other homemade bombs were placed in a second Scotiabank branch and in front of the chain restaurant Sanborns, but these were disabled before exploding. A phone call was placed to authorities shortly before midnight, which warned of the bombings.

None of the exploded bombs resulted in injuries or death.

A coalition of five leftist guerrilla groups from Oaxaca claimed responsibility for the blasts. There are no known ties between these guerrilla groups and Oaxacan protesters, and APPO members denied any involvement in or knowledge of the bombings.

==== 10–13 November 2006 ====
Despite the presence of federal police in the city, the APPO has continued to organize, holding a Constituent Congress to discuss plans to rewrite Oaxaca's political constitution. Likewise, to broaden its focus across the state and develop future projects, the movement formed the State Council of the Popular Assembly of the Peoples of Oaxaca (CEAPPO). This new council will be formed of 260 representatives from the various regions of Oaxaca, including 40 members of the teachers' union. This represents a significant development for the APPO's continuing attempts to develop alternative political proposals while still pushing for the removal of Ulises Ruiz.

==== 25–26 November 2006 ====
On Saturday, 25 November 2006, a large clash between the federal police and demonstrators occurred in the evening following the seventh megamarch held by the APPO. The march began peacefully, but the situation turned violent when the police responded with tear gas and rubber bullets as protesters attempted to encircle the city's zócalo. It is unclear who instigated the violence, but the clash quickly spread through the city as protesters fought back with rocks and homemade PVC rockets. Police took the APPO encampment in the Santo Domingo plaza and arrested more than 160 people. Many APPO supporters were hospitalized, and the deaths of three protesters were reported but remain unconfirmed.

On Saturday and continuing on Sunday, 26 November, protesters set numerous vehicles on fire, and fires also destroyed or damaged four buildings housing government offices (including a tax and court office), one university building, and an office building of a local trade association. Three hotels were also attacked, and some local businesses were looted.

On Monday, 27 November 2006, the Chief of the Federal Police, Ardelio Vargas, stated that the APPO would no longer be tolerated. "There will be no more tolerance (...) those who go against the law will have their punishment. The warrants and orders of arrest are not ordered by the police, but by local and federal judges", he said. Efforts have been made to follow through on these threats as movement leaders have been arrested and organizational offices have been raided. After indications that the APPO would assemble at the State University Campus following the weekends confrontations, Vargas said that "there will be no violation of the autonomy of the University".

In the following days, the APPO removed the last of their barricades from the city and turned over control of the university radio station to the rector, citing a lack of security. APPO leaders have gone into hiding, claiming a repressive crackdown by state authorities against those involved in the movement. The police have been accused of arresting teachers out of classrooms, beating detainees, and making false arrests.

=== December 2006 ===
On Monday, 4 December, hours after he said at a news conference in Mexico City that he had gone to the capital to negotiate a peaceful solution, Flavio Sosa was arrested by police on charges related to the barricades, vandalism, and irregular detentions carried out by some protesters. Sosa's brother, Horacio, and two other men were also arrested on unspecified charges. Flavio Sosa's heavy-set, bearded presence became an emblem of APPO. After his arrest, the PRD, through their speaker, Gerardo Fernandez Noroña, revealed that Sosa was a member of the party's National Council and said that this obliged them to assume Sosa's legal defense.

The following week, the federal police seized armament from Oaxaca's State Police and said that local forces were under investigation based on accusations of murder that the APPO had made against them. The APPO reported that the federal government offered to not detain any other members of their movement.

== Ulises Ruiz ==
At the heart of the continuing conflict were attitudes towards the state's governor, Ulises Ruiz, a member of the Institutional Revolutionary Party, which governed Mexico for most of the 20th century. Ruiz was a polemical figure whom opponents accused of stealing his 2004 election, suppressing the freedom of the press, destroying public spaces and historical monuments in the city, and repressing political opponents. Protestors argued that the constitution gives the central government the power under certain circumstances to remove a sitting governor; the Senate of the Republic, voted on the issue and decided that those "special circumstances" are not to be found in Oaxaca.

As the conflict in Oaxaca grew more intractable, outside pressure on Ruiz to resign increased, but he refused to resign and, in fact, served the remainder of his term as governor. The Senate blamed both the governor and the APPO for the violence that originated in the state, while the business group Coparmex in the state of Puebla and the then Secretary of the Interior Carlos Abascal called for his resignation or blamed him for the conflict. The APPO made his resignation or removal their one non-negotiable demand before they would agree to end the conflict.

In the end, Governor Ulises Ruiz refused to resign and served the remainder of his term.

== Legacy of art activism ==
The Asamblea de Artistas Revolucionarios de Oaxaca (ASARO) formed in June 2006 as the artistic wing of the APPO, making political and social work in woodblock and linoleum block printing, stencils, wheat-pasting, screen printing, and large-scale graffiti murals. Other printmaking collectives formed alongside ASARO, and members have described a relationship of "brotherhood and sisterhood amongst our spaces." Active collectives include ASARO, Colectivo Subterráneos, Lapiztola, Taller Artístico Comunitario, Burro Press, and Cooperativa Gráfica Oaxaca.

== See also ==
- Autonomous Municipality of San Juan Copala
- San Juan Copala
- Zapatista Army of National Liberation
