= José Murat Casab =

Mexican politician

Governor of Oaxaca
- In office 1 December 1998 – 30 November 2004
- Preceded by: Diódoro Carrasco Altamirano
- Succeeded by: Ulises Ruiz Ortiz

Personal details
- Born: 18 October 1947 (age 77); Ixtepec, Oaxaca
- Political party: Institutional Revolutionary Party
- Profession: Lawyer
- Website: https://josemurat.com.mx/

José Murat Casab (Spanish pronunciation: [xoˈse muˈɾat]; born October 18, 1947) is a Mexican politician and a member of the Institutional Revolutionary Party. He was Governor of Oaxaca and is a Diputado Federal elected from the ranks of Alliance for Mexico of Institutional Revolutionary Party-Ecologist Green Party of Mexico. He is of Assyrian descent, born to a Chaldean Catholic family from the village of Tel Keppe, Iraq.

Murat was a controversial governor but a competent political speaker. After he assumed office on December 1, 1998 a series of scandals tarnished the governor's office.

He participated in the important negotiations that led to the implementation of the Pact for Mexico and was appointed to be part of the Governing Council of the Pact for Mexico.

In 2003, he donated the Statue of Benito Juárez to the city of Fresno, California.

Preceded by Diódoro Carrasco Altamirano	Governor of Oaxaca; 1998 - 2004	Succeeded by Ulises Ruiz Ortiz
