= Movement of Trique Unification and Struggle =

The Movement of Trique Unification and Struggle (Spanish: Movimiento de Unificación y Lucha Triqui) is one of the oldest and strongest left wing organizations in the state of Oaxaca, in Mexico. MULT works with indigenous people around Oaxaca.

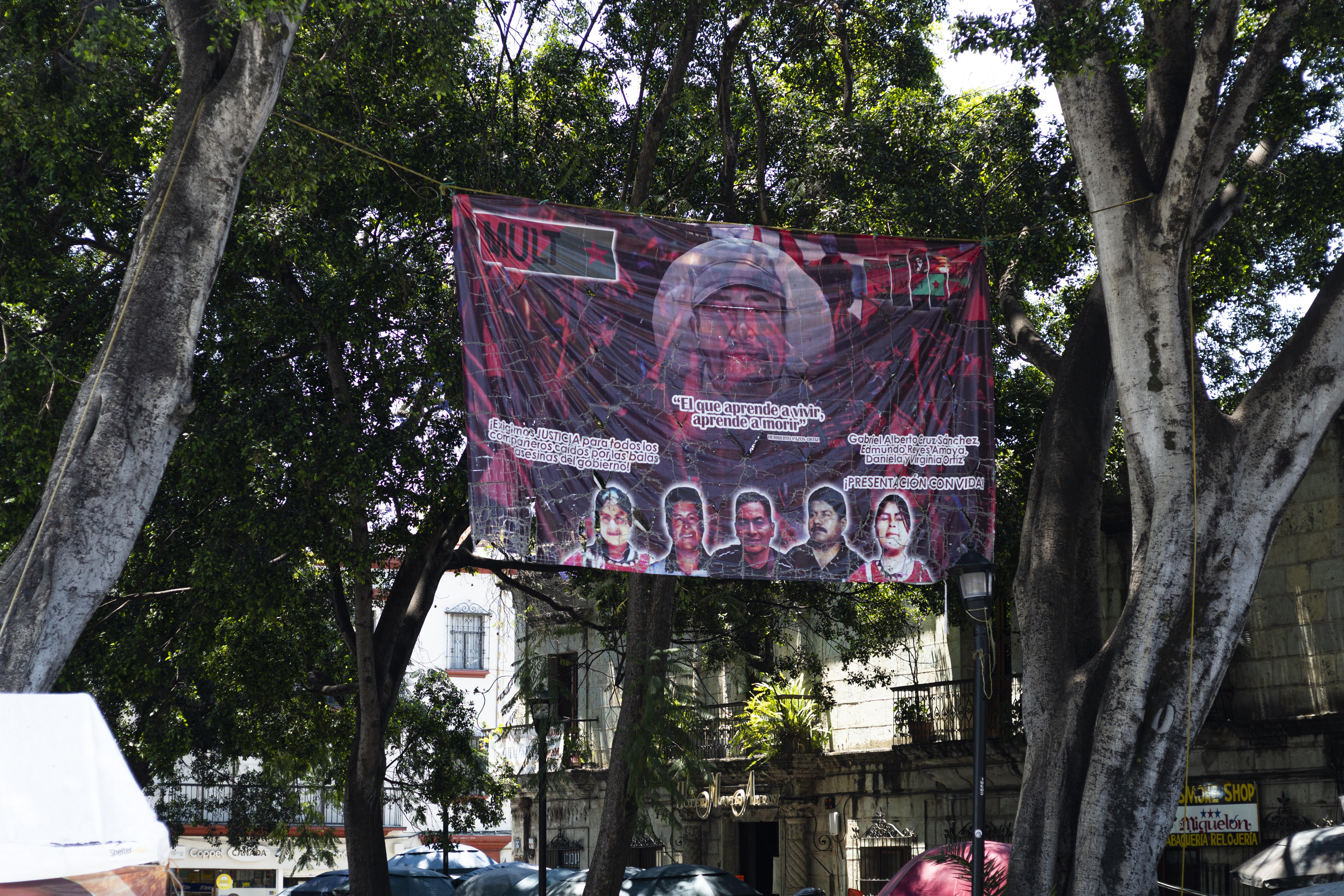
MULT banner hanging in the Plaza de la Constitución, Oaxaca de Juárez

The Movement of Trique Unification and Struggle developed closer ties with EZLN from Chiapas.
