= Blackfire Exploration =

Canadian Mining Company

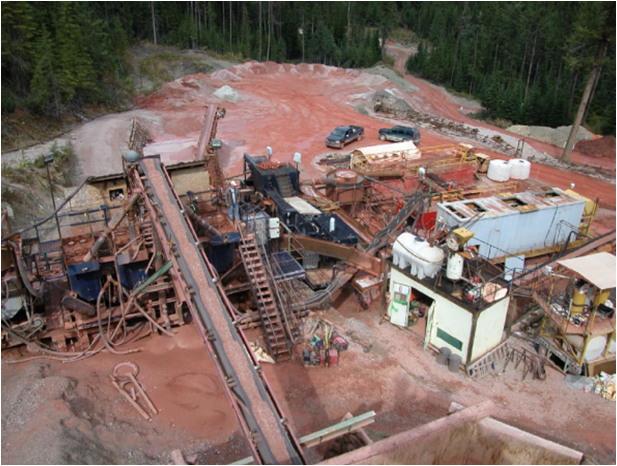
Barite Crushing & Jig Plant

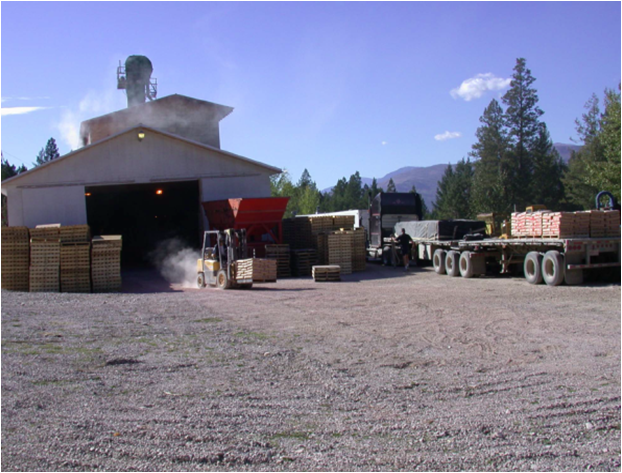
Fine Grinding Mill

Blackfire Exploration Ltd. is an exploration and mining company based in Calgary, Alberta, Canada. The company holds mineral rights in British Columbia, Canada, and Chiapas, Mexico (through its 100% owned Mexican subsidiary company: Blackfire Exploration Mexico S de RL de CV). Blackfire has Canadian and Mexican mineral properties at various stages of development and is currently focused on projects in both Canada and Chiapas, Mexico:

Blackfire Exploration operated the La Revancha mine in Mexico from 2007 to 2009 selling high-grade barite for oilfield drilling to the Mexican market. Blackfire discovered multiple high grade deposits of vanadium, titanium, barite, gold and antimony while working in Chiapas, Mexico.

== Controversy ==
In 2009, three Blackfire employees (one current and two former employees) were arrested in regards to the murder of Mariano Abarca, an anti-mining activist from Chicomuselo. Only a few days later, Blackfire's mine in Chicomuselo was closed by the State Government authorities due to permitting concerns. The former mayor of Chicomuselo, Mayor Julio César Velázquez Calderón, has been accused by Blackfire and others of extortion and theft of funds.

In 2009, Blackfire reported to the State Government that the Mayor had misappropriated Town funds, which were in place to repair local road damage caused by heavy mining equipment being moved through the town; and for the sponsorship of the local town fair. Blackfire claimed in December 2009 that [Mayor Velázquez Calderón] 'asked for 10,000 pesos payment per month to prevent the Mexican co-operative farm near the mine from taking up arms'. On December 18, 2009 about 500 people demonstrated in the neighbouring town of Frontera Comalapa. asserting that Blackfire's misappropriated funds were actually a bribe; after a lengthy investigation authorities did not lay any charges.(cite needed)

In January 2012, Activist Horacio Culebros Borrayas stated that the shutdown of the mine was because the Governor Juan Sabines Guerrero and the Governor Under Secretary, Nemesio Ponce's desire to have Blackfire's mineral wealth for themselves. Mr. Culebros Borrayas also accused both men of assassinating Activist Mariano Abarca Roblero; and falsely imprisoning Horacio Culebros Borrayas and Walter Leon Montoya; and indirectly driving the Canadian company out of Chiapas. Culebros Borrayas and Leon Montoya at the time where political adversaries to the State Government because they prevented the Governor from violating the State constitution and exposed a massive money laundering operation being undertaken by the State government

In February 2013, two former employees of Blackfire, Roblero Ciro Perez and Luis Antonio Flores Villatoro were detained, interrogated and lie detector tested by the State police, in regard to the murder of Mr. Abarca. Both men were later deemed cleared. The investigation is ongoing and remains focused on the former State government officials Nemesio Ponce and the former Governor Juan Sabines Guerrero.

In 2015 the Canadian Government through its Royal Canadian Mounted Police [RCMP], cleared Blackfire after a multi-year corruption investigation in regard to the 2008 bribery and corruption of then-Mayor of Chicomuselo, Chiapas, Julio César Velázquez Calderón of the PRD party. Specifically, the RCMP states that "The assessment of the evidence does not support criminal charges"

On July 31, 2019, the Canadian government stated that its Mexican Embassy has had no involvement with any coverup of the 2009 murder of activist Mariano Abarca, a murder allegedly at the hands of the Blackfire Exploration. Family members vow to continue the struggle. Abarca's son said, "We are not going to get our father back, but we want to establish a precedent. There are mining conflicts in many areas of Mexico and in other countries in Latin America. It is important to demonstrate the frequent support they get from embassies."
