= SV Estelle =

Finnish sailboat built in 1922

- Estelle alongside in her home port Turku, Finland

History
- Owner: Eestaas; Northern Breeze AB
- Operator: Uusi Tuuli
- Port of registry: Finland
- Launched: 1922
- Identification: IMO number: 5108883; Callsign: OGPW

General characteristics
- Type: Schooner
- Length: 42 m (138 ft)
- Sail plan: Bermuda

SV Estelle is a fair trade cargo Bermuda schooner, currently the biggest sail ship in Finnish register. She was built in Emden, Germany in 1922 as a 42-meter (137.8 feet), steel-hulled ship for trawl-fishing in the Baltic Sea. Estelle's hometown is Turku. She was long owned by Eestaas and operated by Uusi Tuuli. Now she belongs to a "Ship to Gaza" company Northern Breeze AB, registered in Turku, Finland.

Estelle was previously maintained by volunteers who had the desire to sail to Africa to export assistance supplies and bring back fair trade goods and operate according to the ideals of Fair Trade. She made her first trip to Africa in 2002, before which she also visited the Mediterranean Sea, Ireland and some harbors of Northern Europe. In addition, many of the ship's crew have been trained while sailing in the Baltic Sea.

After her trip to Angola, Estelle has mainly sailed in the Baltic Sea, participated in the Tall Ships Race of 2003, and collaborated with Greenpeace on research and campaign work. Estelle is also constantly training new crew members since it is open to practically any one.

Estelle's operations are primarily based on volunteers. Operations strive for environmental sustainability, solidarity and global equality. Since 2003, Prometheus camps have been organized on Estelle every summer as a non-religious alternative to confirmation camp. During the camp the boat tours around the archipelago near Turku.

Estelle joined Sail Training International's (STI) Class A Forum as a member during the spring of 2005. The forum is intended for training the crews of the world's largest sailboats, improving operations and other related development.

On 27 April 2010, Estelle board member Jyri Jaakkola was killed by paramilitaries in Mexico.

In 2012, Estelle was sold to Swedish interests for an attempt to break the Gaza blockade.

== Gaza mission ==
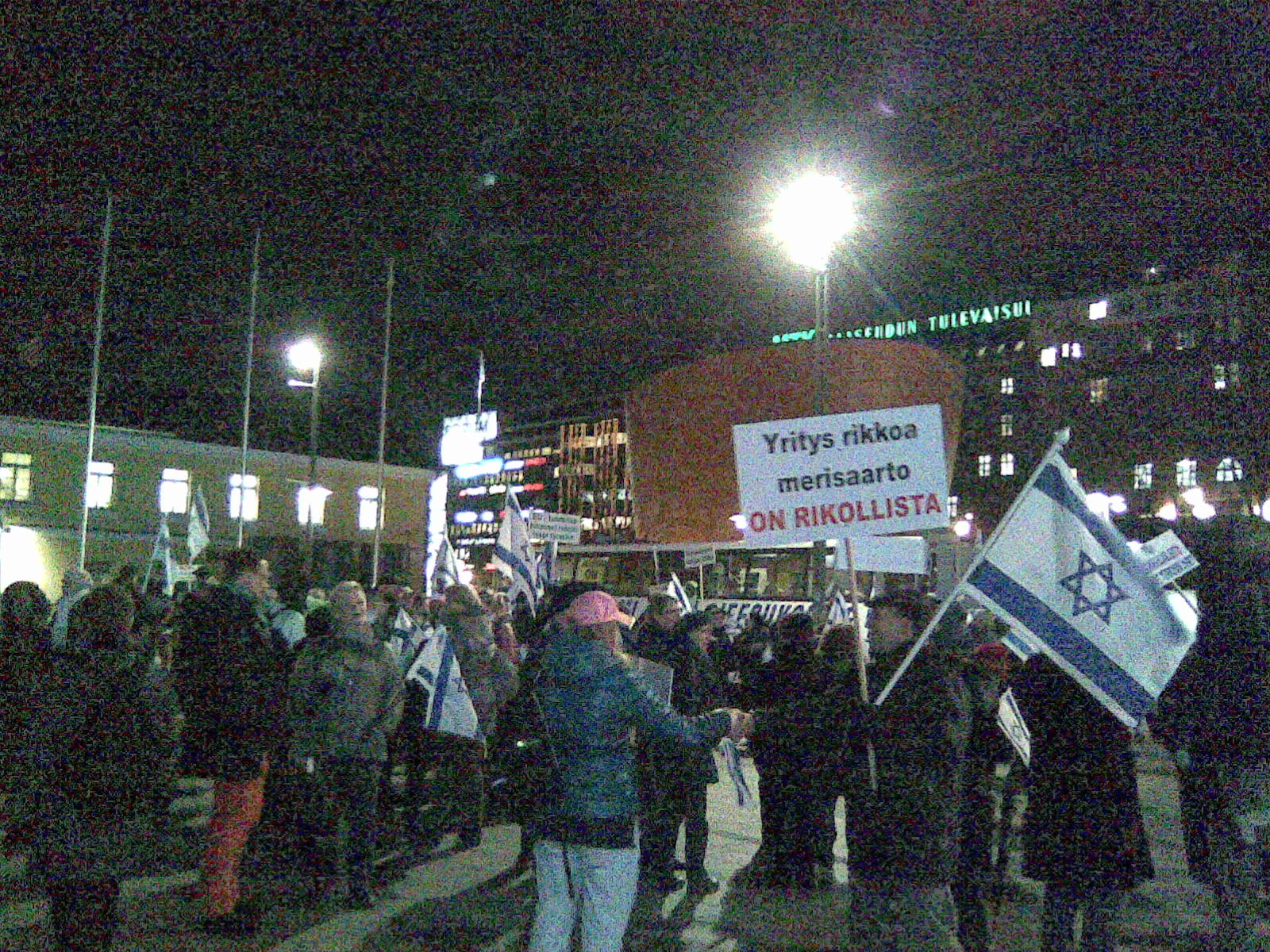
A demonstration in support of the State of Israel, in the square Narinkka in central Helsinki in November 2012. The placard translates as "The attempt to break the maritime blockade is criminal."

Estelle departed for the Gaza Strip to try to break Israel's maritime blockade in the summer of 2012. "We are sailing with peaceful intentions," a crew member said. Estelle is Swedish-owned, but Finnish-flagged ship. According to the Ship to Gaza organization, there are also eleven Swedes, two Finns, five Greeks, four Norwegians, three Israelis, three Spanish citizens, one Canadian and one Italian aboard.

On October 20, 2012, the Israeli military seized the vessel without incident and took it to the port of Ashdod. In August 2013 the state of Israel filed a petition to confiscate the vessel. In August 2016, the Israeli supreme court ruled that the state cannot confiscate the Estelle, and ordered to state to pay NIS 40,000 to the ship's owner to cover court costs.

Estelle is the latest in a series of vessels crewed by activists who have tried to challenge Israel's blockade on Gaza, imposed after Hamas seized power in 2007.
