= San Juan Copala =

San Juan Copala is a town in the municipality of Santiago Juxtlahuaca in the Mexican state of Oaxaca. It is located at 17°11′14″N 97°57′46″W, at an altitude of 1578 meters above sea level. According to the 2005 census, carried out by the Instituto Nacional de Estadística y Geografía, San Juan Copala has a total of 786 inhabitants.

San Juan Copala is exclusively inhabited by the indigenous people of the area, the Triqui.

== Autonomy and political struggles ==
San Juan Copala was an independent municipality of Oaxaca from 1826 to 1948, when the state congress ordered its dissolution and annexation to the nearby territory of Santiago Juxtlahuaca. Since this annexation, Triqui people have been in a sometimes violent struggle with state and local authorities over the control and governance of their town. Due to a large series of political and social conflicts, in 2006 some residents of the town declared themselves an "Autonomous Municipality" following the example of the Municipios Autónomos Rebeldes Zapatistas in Chiapas.

It has been the setting of events that brought international attention to the human rights situation in Mexico in 2010, when human rights observers Jyri Jaakkola and Bety Cariño were murdered by members of the local paramilitary group UBISORT while trying to deliver humanitarian goods to San Juan Copala, which had been cut off from supplies such as food, medicine, electricity and water by a UBISORT blockade for several months.
