= Ulises Ruiz Ortiz =

Mexican politician

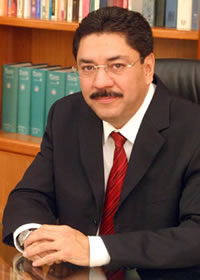

Governor of Oaxaca
- In office December 1, 2004 – November 30, 2010
- Preceded by: José Murat
- Succeeded by: Gabino Cué

Personal details
- Born: April 9, 1958 (age 68) Chalcatongo, Oaxaca, Mexico
- Party: Institutional Revolutionary Party
- Spouse: Lourdes Salinas
- Education: UNAM
- Profession: Lawyer

Ulises Ernesto Ruiz Ortiz (born April 9, 1958) is a Mexican politician and former governor of the State of Oaxaca. He took office in 2004 as a member of the Institutional Revolutionary Party (PRI).

== Early career ==
In the 1997 mid-term election he was elected to the Chamber of Deputies to represent the sixth district of Oaxaca.

== Governor of Oaxaca ==
Ruiz Ortiz was accused by some of rigging the 2004 election for the governorship. Therefore, many did not view him as the popularly elected governor of Oaxaca.

More controversies occurred during Ruiz's administration.

First, the newspaper Noticias de Oaxaca, which holds political views contrary to those of Ruiz, suffered a massive strike organized by the Confederación Revolucionaria de Obreros y Campesinos union, affiliated with Ruiz's PRI. Some media outlets, like Reforma viewed this action as a repression of free speech. The paper tried to publish out of the state, but distribution trucks were vandalized. The paper openly accused Ruiz of repression.

Other examples included the destruction caused by public works to the historic city center of the state capital. Some intellectuals called the destruction so appalling that they feared that UNESCO would retire the city's declaration as a World Heritage Site.

At the beginning of the 2006 Mexican general election campaign, Presidential candidate Andres Manuel López Obrador tried to campaign in one of the state's poorest municipalities in Guelatao, also the birthplace of Benito Juárez. The rally was obstructed by public works started only a day earlier by the state government.

=== 2006 conflict ===
Since May 2006 (previous to the federal elections), Ruiz Ortiz's administration faced protests by striking teachers from Section 22 of the SNTE (the National Union of Teachers). Among other demands, the teachers demanded an economic reclassification for the state of Oaxaca, which would allow a raise in the salaries. Protesters sat in the city's main square until their demands were met. The protesters refused to meet with the government of Ruiz, insisting on meeting only with members of the federal government. On June 14, 2006, police were sent to remove the teachers forcibly from the square using gas bombs and rubber bullets. The strikers responded and managed to repel the police forces. After these actions, the teachers movement added to their demands the immediate resignation of the governor. The perceived repression used against the teachers ignited numerous protests from the people inside and outside of the state.

Numerous civil and political organizations joined the teachers movement, forming the APPO or Asamblea Popular del Pueblo de Oaxaca (Popular Assembly of the People of Oaxaca). The main petition of the APPO was the immediate resignation of Ulises Ruiz. Numerous popular protests demanding Ruiz's resignation took place all over the state. Government offices, public radio stations and public broadcasting systems were taken over by the APPO. A legal petition was sent to the federal Congress to remove the governor.

Ruiz Ortiz repeatedly stated that he had no plans to resign. While initially not involved in the conflict, the Federal government sent a commission to help in the negotiations and called for the governor to step down, to no success. On October 29, federal police were sent to occupy the city and were involved in confrontations with the APPO throughout November.

Since the government offices remained closed due to the protests, the governor moved his office to a hotel.

In August 2006 the conflict became increasingly violent, with increased attacks aimed at terrorizing protesters. Armed groups have fired on popular protests, and on August 21 and 22 attacked radio stations held by the APPO. Ulises Ruiz's administration denies responsibility for these attacks.

On September 3, 2006, 193 delegates from different organizations which constituted the APPO (Popular Assembly of the People of Oaxaca) declared the governor Ulises Ruiz Ortiz (URO) "proscrito" – banned, exiled, unwelcome – in the state of Oaxaca. According to this "declaration", the ex-governor would be replaced by a "proclamation of good government for the city of Oaxaca, a proclamation for the 570 municipalities, and a manifesto to the nation, declaring the banishment of Ruiz Ortiz from the government, and that the government will continue to be exercised from the historic center of the city of Oaxaca".

At least seventeen people were killed in Oaxaca, almost of them by police or paramilitary forces allied with Ulises Ruiz Ortiz since the onset of the conflict, including US IndyMedia Journalist Bradley Roland Will. In response to recent deaths, Subcomandante Marcos of the EZLN issued a statement from the Clandestine Indigenous Revolution Committee, claiming that the Federal Government caused these deaths to help Ruiz stay in power.

On November 6, 2006, the conflict escalated after five groups committed a series of small bombing attacks in Mexico City demanding Ruiz's resignation. The attacks consisted of three explosions in the PRI headquarters, the TEPJF main office, a branch of Scotiabank. Presumably, eight bombs were set and another Scotiabank branch was set to explode, as well as a Sanborns store, however these last two targets failed to explode. The Federal Government stated that these acts are terrorist propaganda activities that seek to plant fear in the population, however it also stated that the only possible solution is that Ruiz resigned his post in Oaxaca, or personally negotiated an end to the violence.

== Later career ==
After his party lost in the 2010 election, Ulises Ruiz handed over the governorship of Oaxaca to Gabino Cué Monteagudo of the opposition Convergencia party on 1 December 2010. He was arrested in Cancún on suspicion of embezzlement in 2014 and, in 2021, he was expelled from the PRI.

In September 2023, he filed paperwork with the National Electoral Institute enabling him to collect signatures for a possible run as an independent candidate for President of Mexico in the 2024 general election.

== See also ==
- 2006 Oaxaca protests

Preceded by José Murat Casab	Governor of Oaxaca; 2004–2010	Succeeded by Gabino Cué Monteagudo
