= Vicente Fox =

President of Mexico from 2000 to 2006

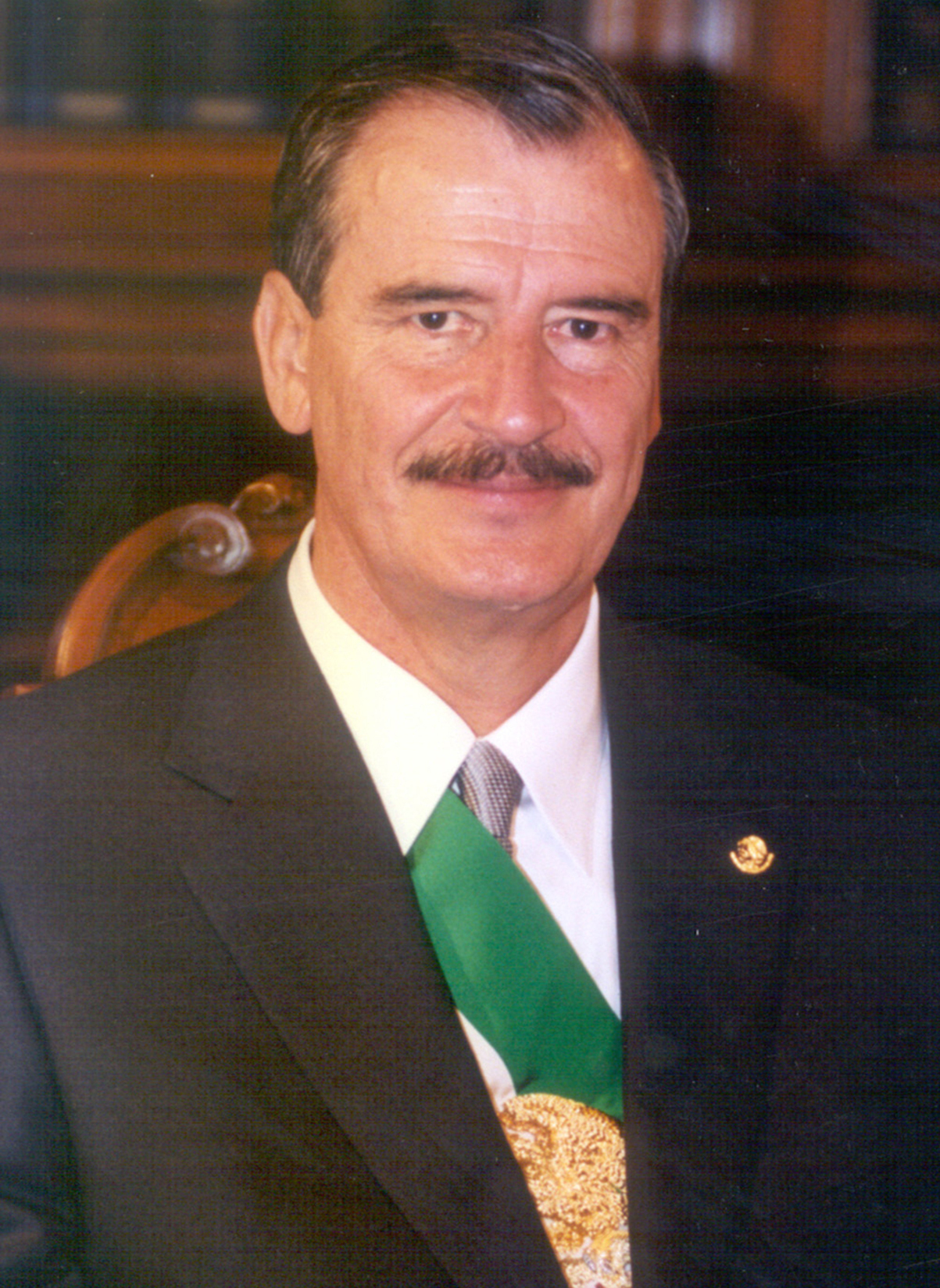
- Fox in 2000

62nd President of Mexico
- In office 1 December 2000 – 30 November 2006
- Preceded by: Ernesto Zedillo
- Succeeded by: Felipe Calderón

Governor of Guanajuato
- In office 26 June 1995 – 7 August 1999
- Preceded by: Carlos Medina Plascencia
- Succeeded by: Ramón Martín Huerta

Member of the Chamber of Deputies
- In office 1 September 1988 – 31 August 1991
- Preceded by: Héctor Hugo Varela Flores
- Succeeded by: Luis Arturo Torres del Valle
- Constituency: Guanajuato's 3rd district

Co-president of Centrist Democrat International
- Incumbent
- Assumed office 1 December 2006
- Preceded by: Pier Ferdinando Casini

Personal details
- Born: Vicente Fox Quesada; 2 July 1942 (age 84) Mexico City, Mexico
- Party: National Action Party (until 2012; since 2021)
- Other political affiliations: Independent (2012–2021)
- Spouses: Lilian de la Concha (m. 1969; div. 1990) Marta Sahagún (m. 2001)
- Children: Ana Cristina Fox; Rodrigo Fox; Paulina Fox; Vicente Fox Jr.
- Parent(s): José Luis Fox; Mercedes Quesada
- Education: Universidad Iberoamericana (BBA)
- Occupation: Businessman, politician

Vicente Fox Quesada (Latin American Spanish: [biˈsente ˈfoks keˈsaða]; born 2 July 1942) is a Mexican businessman and politician who served as the 62nd president of Mexico from 2000 to 2006. After campaigning as a right-wing populist, Fox was elected president on the National Action Party (PAN) ticket in the 2000 election. He became the first president not from the Institutional Revolutionary Party (PRI) since 1929, and the first elected from an opposition party since Francisco I. Madero in 1911. Fox won the election with 43 percent of the vote. Considered a social-welfare promoter, along with Julio Frenk Mora, he formulated, signed and implemented the Seguro Popular which helped circa 55 million independent workers.

As president, Fox continued the neoliberal economic policies his predecessors from the PRI had adopted since the 1980s. The first half of his administration saw a further shift of the federal government to the right, strong relations with the United States and George W. Bush, unsuccessful attempts to introduce a value-added tax to medicines and build an airport in Texcoco, and a diplomatic conflict with Cuban leader Fidel Castro. The murder of human rights lawyer Digna Ochoa in 2001 called into question the Fox administration's commitment to breaking with the authoritarian past of the PRI era.

The second half of his administration was marked by his conflict with Andrés Manuel López Obrador, the mayor of Mexico City. The PAN and Fox administration unsuccessfully attempted to remove López Obrador from office and prevent him from participating in the 2006 presidential elections. The Fox administration also became embroiled with diplomatic conflicts with Venezuela and Bolivia after supporting the creation of the Free Trade Area of the Americas, which was opposed by those two countries. His last year in office oversaw the controversial 2006 elections, where PAN candidate Felipe Calderón was declared winner by a narrow margin over López Obrador, who claimed the elections had been fraudulent and refused to recognize the results, calling for protests across the country. In the same year, there was civil unrest in Oaxaca, where a teacher's strike culminated into protests and violent clashes asking for the resignation of governor Ulises Ruiz Ortiz, and in the State of Mexico during the San Salvador Atenco riots, where the state and federal governments were later found guilty by the Inter-American Court of Human Rights of human rights violations during the violent repression. On the other hand, Fox was credited with maintaining economic growth and reducing the poverty rate from 43.7% in 2000 to 35.6% in 2006.

After his presidency, Fox returned to his home state of Guanajuato. He has been involved in public speaking and the development of the Vicente Fox Center of Studies, Library and Museum. He is currently the co-president of the Centrist Democrat International, an international organization of centre-right political parties. Fox was expelled from the PAN in 2013, after having endorsed the PRI presidential candidate, Enrique Peña Nieto, in the 2012 elections. In the 2018 election, Fox endorsed the PRI candidate, José Antonio Meade.

== Early years ==
Vicente Fox Quesada was born on 2 July 1942 in Mexico City, the second of nine children. His father, José Luis Fox Pont, was a native-born Mexican of German-American descent. His mother, Mercedes Quesada Etxaide, was a Spanish Basque immigrant from San Sebastián, Gipuzkoa. Fox's family name was originally Fuchs, but was anglicized to "Fox" at some point. His paternal grandfather, Joseph Louis Fuchs, was born in Cincinnati in 1865, attended Woodward High School and moved to Mexico at age 32.

Fox spent his childhood and adolescence at the family ranch in San Francisco del Rincón in Guanajuato. He spent a year at Campion High School in Prairie du Chien, Wisconsin where he learned English. Upon reaching college age, Fox moved to Mexico City to attend the Universidad Iberoamericana and received a bachelor's degree in business administration in 1964. Then in 1974, Fox received a certificate in management skills from Harvard Business School.

=== Business career ===
In 1964, Fox was hired by the Coca-Cola Company as a route supervisor and drove a delivery truck. After nine years, he had risen to the top, serving as the President and Chief Executive of Coca-Cola Mexico; after six years in this role, he was invited to lead all of Coca-Cola's operations in Latin America, but Fox declined and later resigned from Coca-Cola in 1979. It was during the Fox's leadership of Coca-Cola Mexico that Coke became Mexico's top-selling soft drink, increasing Coca-Cola's sales by almost 50%.

After retiring from Coca-Cola, Fox began to participate in various public activities in Guanajuato, where he created the "Patronato de la Casa Cuna Amigo Daniel", an orphanage. He was also the president of the Patronato Loyola, a sponsor of the León campus of the Universidad Iberoamericana and of the Lux Institute.

=== Family life ===
In 1969, Fox married Lilian de la Concha, a receptionist at Coca-Cola. They had four children, Ana Cristina, Vicente, Paulina and Rodrigo. In 1990, after 20 years of marriage, Lilian filed for and was granted a divorce.

Fox remarried on 2 July 2001, while serving as President of Mexico, to Marta María Sahagún Jiménez (until then his spokesperson). The wedding date was the first anniversary of his presidential election and his 59th birthday. For both Fox and Sahagún Jiménez, it was their second marriage.

== Early political career ==
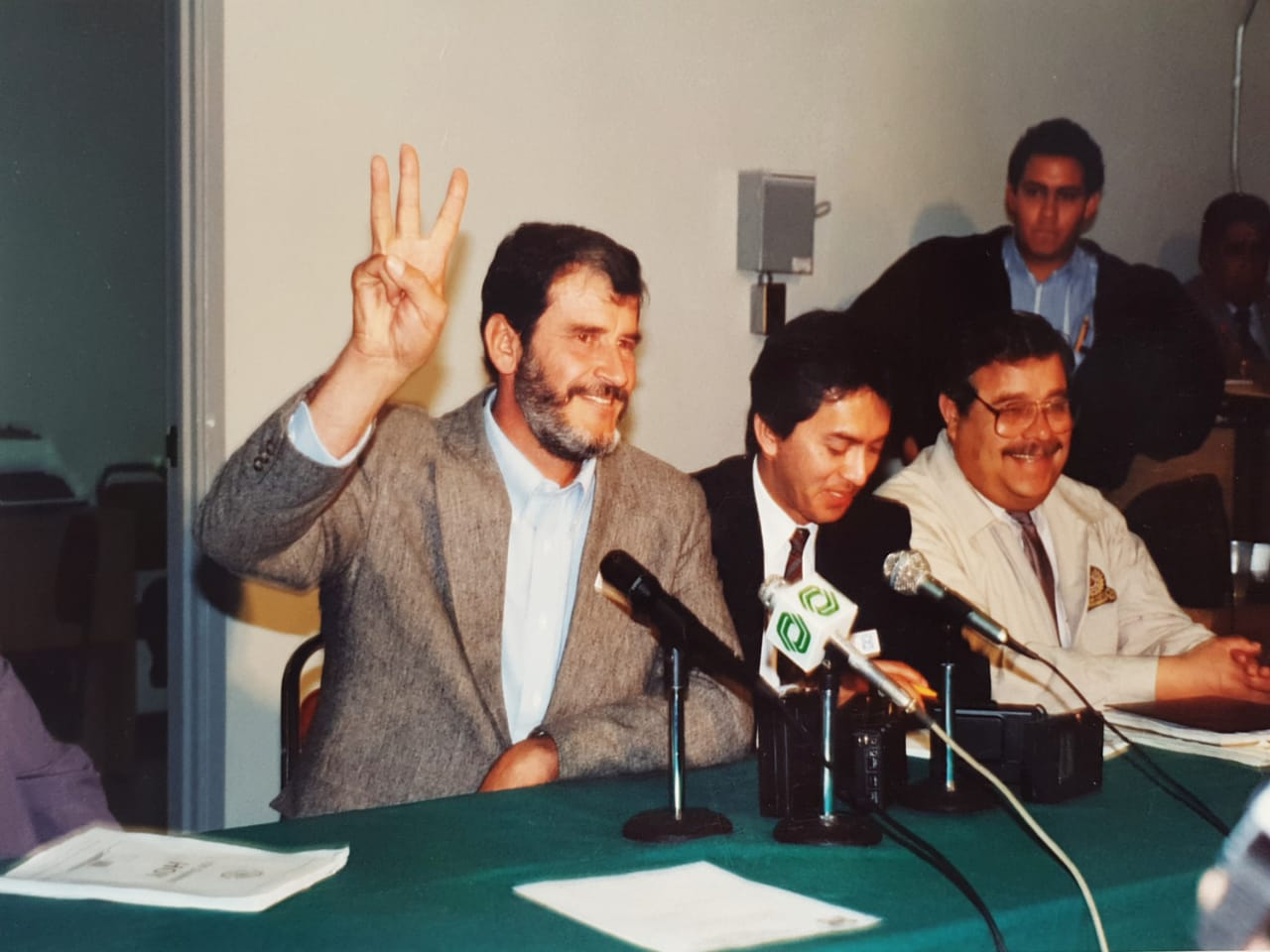
Fox during a press conference, June 1990

With the support of Manuel Clouthier, Vicente Fox joined the Partido Acción Nacional on 1 March 1988. That same year, he was elected to the federal Chamber of Deputies, representing the third congressional district in León, Guanajuato.

=== Governor of Guanajuato ===
In 1991, after serving in the Chamber of Deputies, Fox sought the governorship in Guanajuato, but lost the disputed election to Ramón Aguirre Velázquez of the PRI. Following the election, local discontent over allegations of fraud surrounding Aguirre Velázquez's victory led the PRI candidate to decline to take office. The state congress appointed Carlos Medina Plascencia of the PAN as interim governor.

In the 1995 Guanajuato state election, Fox ran again, and was elected governor with over 58% of the vote. As governor, Fox promoted government efficiency and transparency. He was one of the first state governors of Mexico to give a clear, public and timely account of the finances of his state.

Fox also pushed for the consolidation of small firms, promoted the overseas sales of goods manufactured in Guanajuato, and created an extensive system of small loans to allow the poor to open a changarro (a small shop) and buy a car and a television. Under Fox, Guanajuato became the fifth most important Mexican state economy.

=== Campaign for president ===
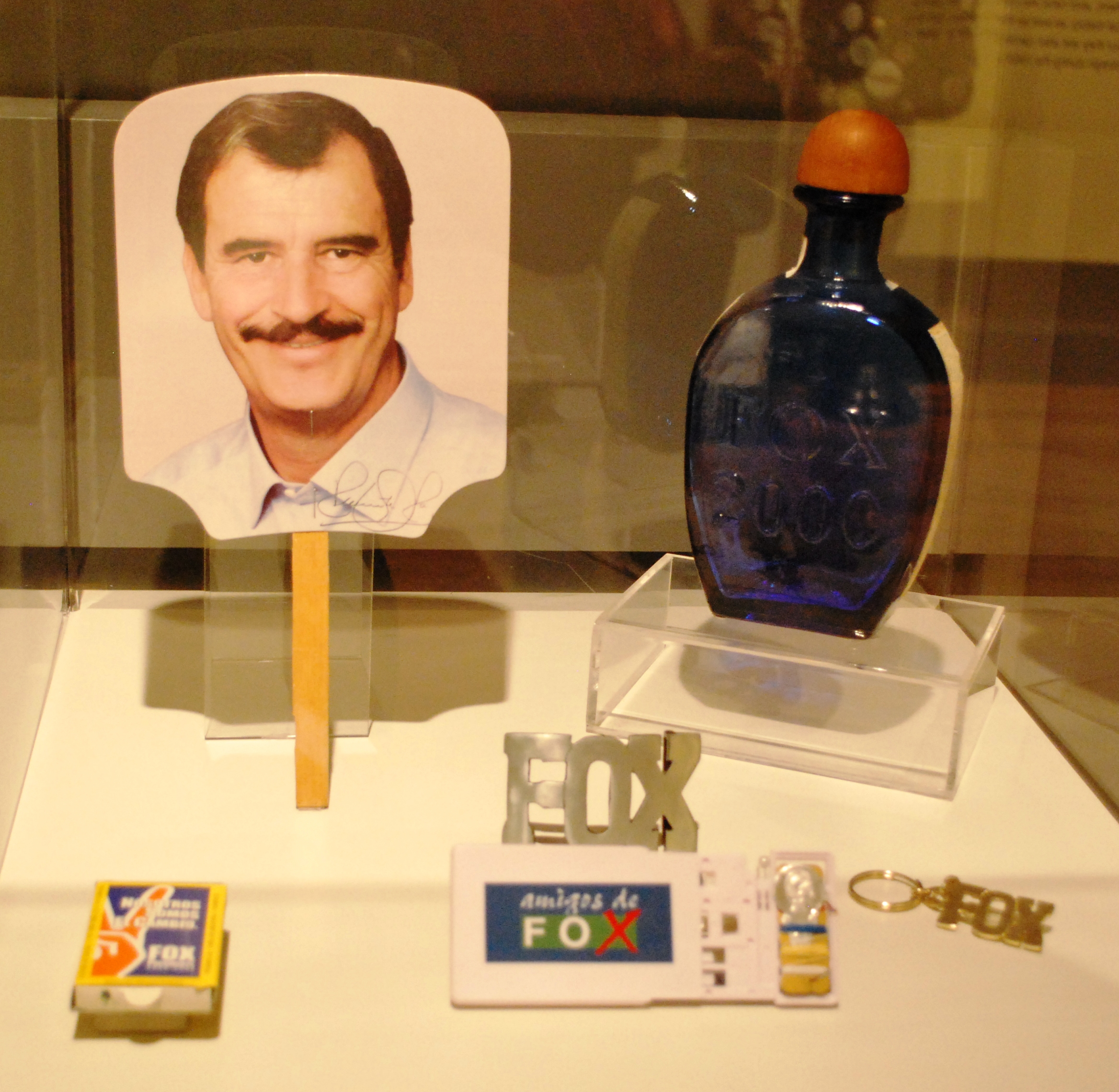
Items from Fox's presidential campaign on display at the Museo del Objeto del Objeto

On 7 July 1997, after the opposition parties first won a majority in the Chamber of Deputies, Vicente Fox decided to run for President of Mexico. In spite of opposition within his political party, Fox secured his candidacy representing the Alliance for Change, a political coalition formed by the National Action Party and the Green Ecological Party of Mexico on 14 November 1999.

During the course of his campaign, a presidential debate was organized, but the three main contenders (Fox, Francisco Labastida of the PRI, and Cuauhtémoc Cárdenas of the PRD) disagreed on the details. One notable disagreement, which was broadcast on national television, was whether the presidential debate should be held that same day or on the following Friday.

During the nationally televised presidential debate, Fox's main opponent, Francisco Labastida, claimed that Fox had repeatedly called him a "sissy" and a "cross-dresser" ("la vestida", a pun on his last name). Fox's campaign slogans were "¡Ya!" ("Right now!"), "Ya ganamos" ("We've already won"), and "Vota Alianza por el Cambio" ("Vote for Alliance for Change").

In addition to some debate controversies, Fox also faced some controversy due to Amigos de Fox (Friends of Fox), a nonprofit fundraising group established by Denise Montaño. The group was instrumental in getting Vicente Fox elected President of Mexico, and the phrase "Amigos de Fox" was used as a campaign slogan referring to the millions of people supporting Fox in the 2000 presidential election.

In 2003, money-laundering charges were lodged against Amigos de Fox, but were dropped shortly before the July 2003 midterm elections.

==== Election results ====
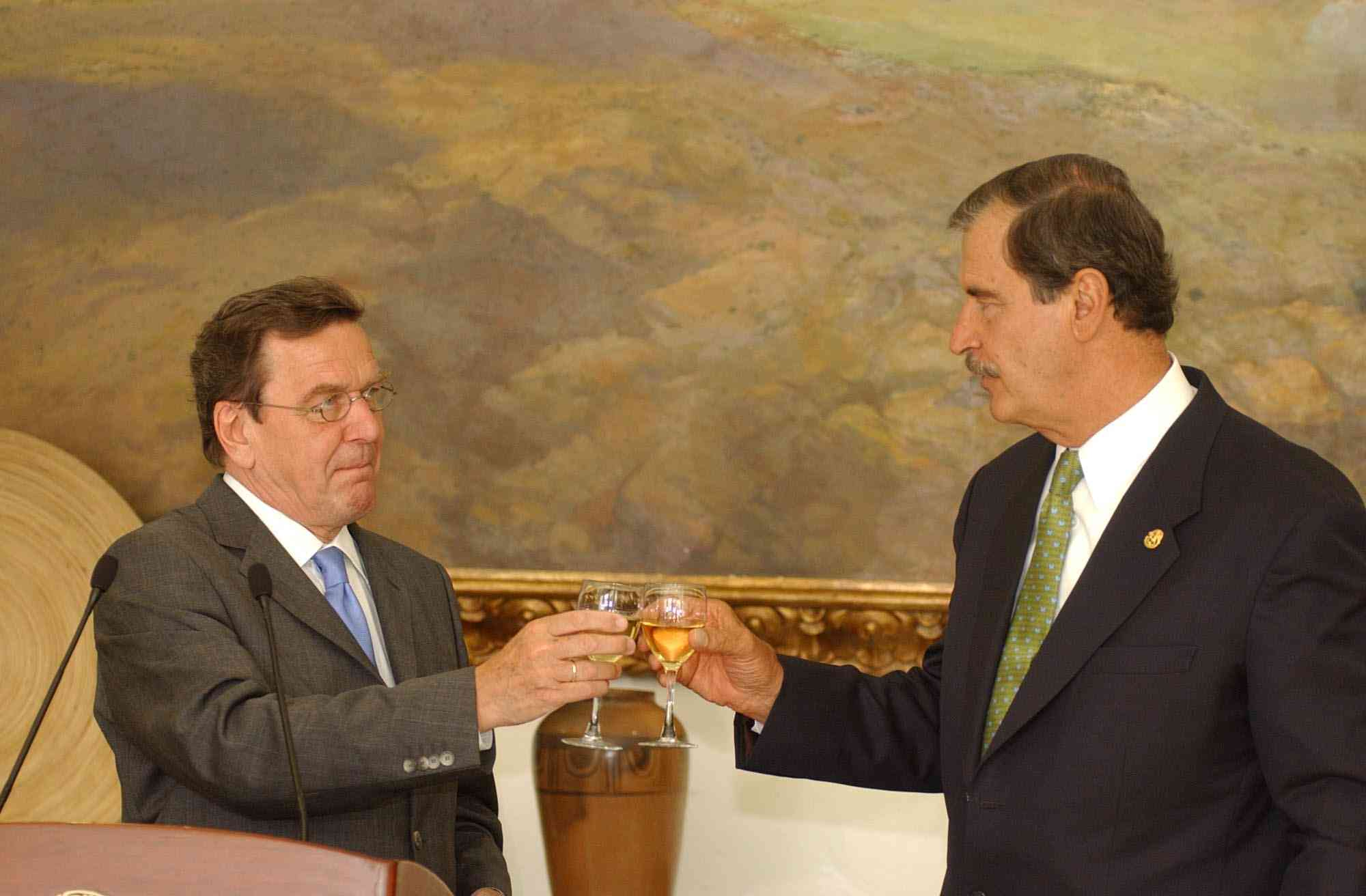
German Chancellor Gerhard Schröder with Fox in Los Pinos, May 2004

On 2 July 2000, his 58th birthday, Fox won the presidential election with 43% (15,989,636 votes) of the popular vote, followed by the Institutional Revolutionary Party (PRI) candidate Francisco Labastida with 36% (13,579,718 votes), and Cuauhtémoc Cárdenas of the Party of the Democratic Revolution (PRD) with 17% (6,256,780 votes). Fox declared victory that same night, a victory that was ratified by then-President Zedillo. After the final results were announced, President-elect Fox addressed thousands of supporters and celebrated his victory with them at the Angel of Independence monument in Mexico City. His opponents conceded the election later that night.

After securing the election, Fox received substantial media coverage, as well as numerous congratulatory messages and phone calls from world leaders, including then-President of the United States Bill Clinton. He took office on 1 December 2000, the first time since 1917 that an opposition candidate had taken power from the long-reigning Institutional Revolutionary Party (PRI).

== Presidency (2000–2006) ==
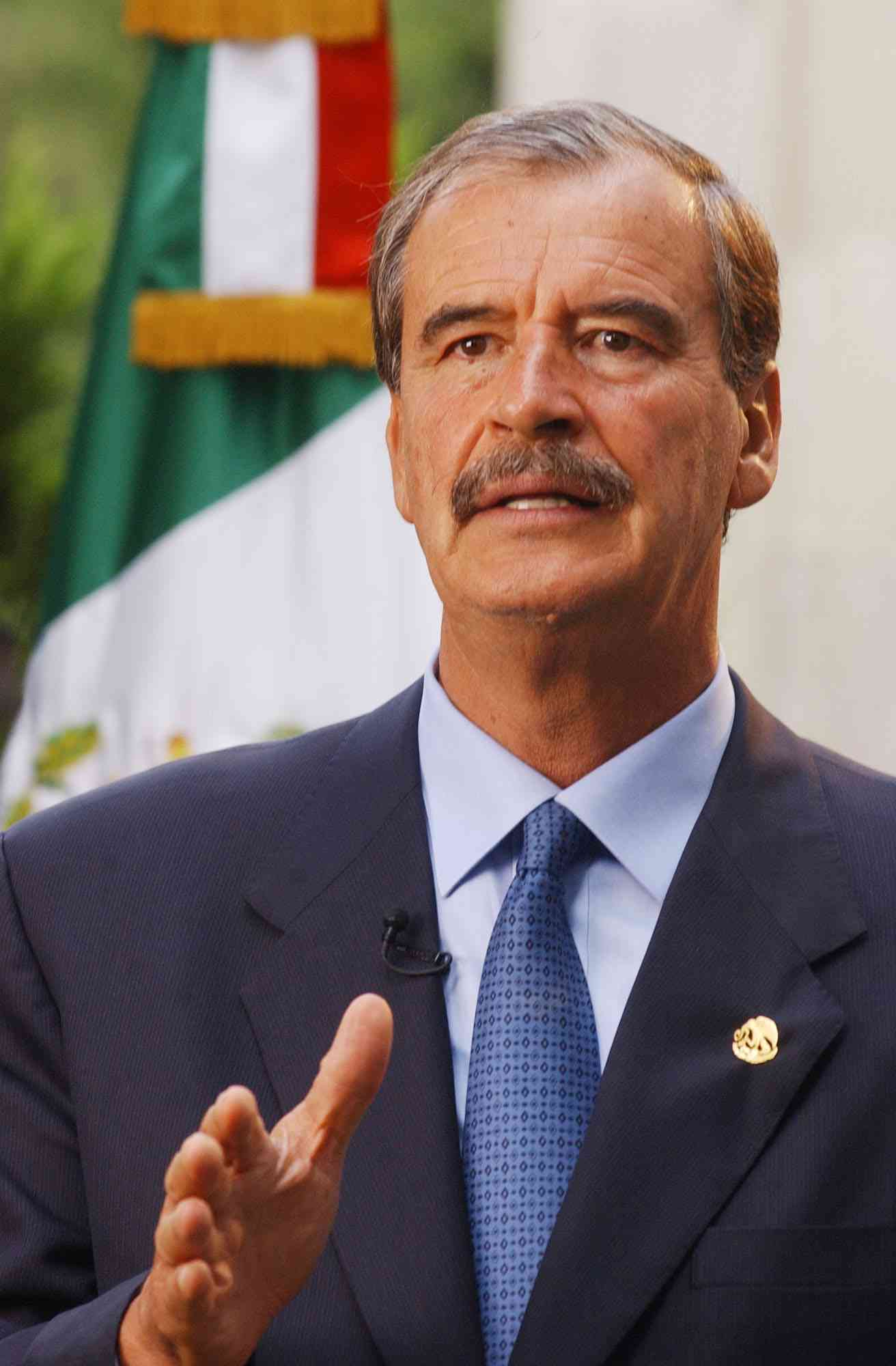
Fox on July 30, 2005

=== Public image ===
During his campaign for president, Vicente Fox became well known for his cowboy style and quirkiness. As a speaker, Fox usually attracted big crowds in the early years of his presidency. At 193 cm (6 ft 4 in), Fox easily stood out in most crowds, and is believed to be one of the tallest presidents in Mexico's history. After his inauguration, President Fox usually wore suits for formal occasions, but opted to wear his signature boots and jeans during his many visits around Mexico.

Fox spread his image as one of peace and welcomed many to his own ranch in the state of Guanajuato. When Fox welcomed U.S. President George W. Bush to the ranch, both presidents were wearing Fox's signature black cowboy boots, prompting The Wall Street Journal to call it "The Boot Summit".

==== Approval ratings ====
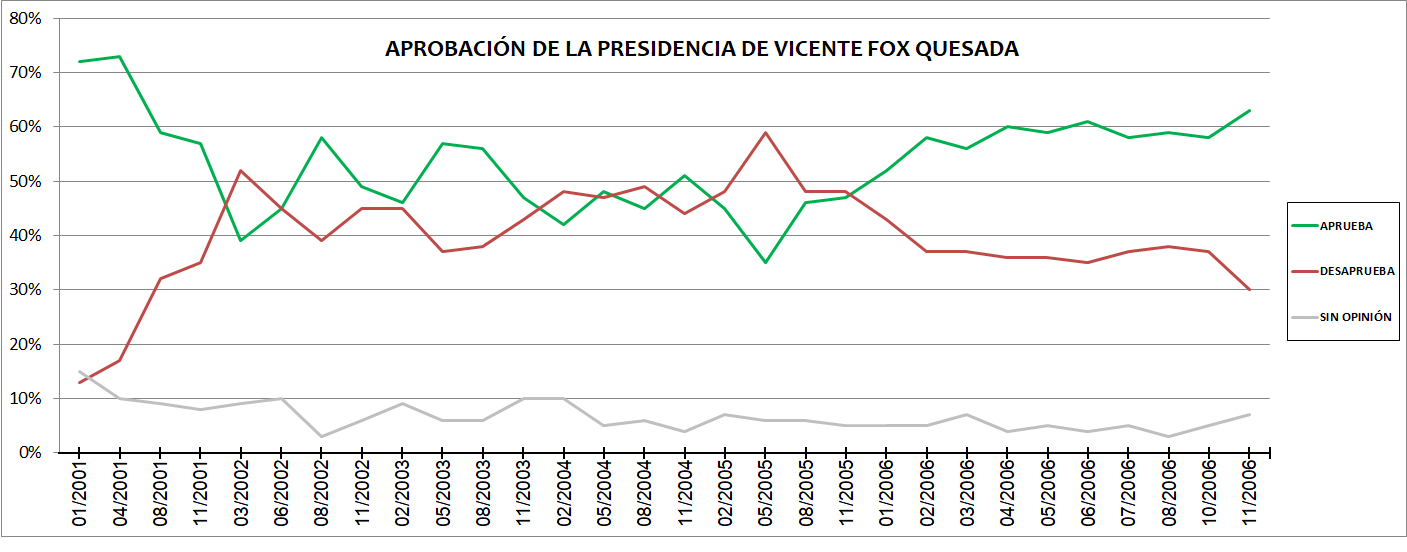
Approval ratings of the Fox administration. Data from GEA-ISA Structura Approve Disapprove Doesn't know/no answer

When Fox took office on 1 December 2000, his approval rating neared 80%. During the rest of his presidency, his average approval rating was of 53%, while his average disapproval rating was of 40%.

As seen in the graphic, after taking office the particularly high points of his approval ratings were:

- August 2002 (58% approval, 39% disapproval, 3% unsure), after Fox suspended the construction of a new airport in the State of Mexico following months of protests by local residents who had resisted their displacement.
- May 2003 (57% approval, 37% disapproval, 6% unsure), after Fox announced that Mexico would not support the US invasion of Iraq.
- Throughout 2006, his average approval rating was 58% and his average disapproval rating was 37%, as Fox was in his last year as president and the public focus was on the Presidential elections of that year. The popularity enjoyed by Fox during this period, however, didn't seem to largely benefit the Presidential candidate of his party (PAN) Felipe Calderón, who was controversially declared winner with only 35.9% of the votes, against Andrés Manuel López Obrador of the PRD who officially obtained 35.3% of the votes and claimed that the election had been fraudulent.

While the lowest points of his approval ratings were:

- March 2002 (39% approval, 52% disapproval, 9% unsure), in the wake of the "Comes y te vas" ("Eat and then leave") scandal: during the United Nations International Conference on Financing for Development, which took place between 18 and 22 March 2002 in the city of Monterrey and was hosted by Fox, a diplomatic incident occurred when on the night of the 19th Fox received a letter from Cuban leader Fidel Castro informing him that Castro intended to attend the event on the 21st, as he had been invited by the United Nations. Hours after receiving the letter, Fox made a telephone call to Castro in which he expressed his surprise at Castro's intention to attend the conference and scolded him for not telling him earlier. During the call, Fox suggested to Castro that he and the Cuban delegation arrive on the 21st as scheduled to make their presentation, and finally attend a lunch with the other leaders, after which they would return to Cuba. Fox was apparently worried that US President George W. Bush, who was also scheduled to arrive on the 21st, would be offended by Castro's presence at the conference, which is why Fox suggested Castro to leave after the lunch. Castro was outraged at the proposal, and told Fox that in response, he would make the contents of the call – which he was secretly taping – public, which he indeed did. The media quickly caught onto the incident, dubbing it "Comes y te vas" ("Eat and then leave") after Fox's suggestion towards Castro to leave the conference after the aforementioned lunch. The scandal badly hurt the Fox administration, as it made him seem subservient to the United States and it also broke with the Mexican diplomatic tradition of neutrality towards Cuba.
- February 2004 (42% approval, 48% disapproval, 10% unsure), in the midst of scandals surrounding the First Lady Marta Sahagún, who was accused by an article in the Financial Times of using public funds to run her "Vamos México" foundation. In the same month, Sahagún announced that she intended to become the PAN candidate for the 2006 Presidential elections, an announcement that was deeply unpopular within the party.
- Throughout the rest of 2004 and 2005, Fox's approval rating on average was 45% and his average disapproval rate was of 49%. His generalized descent in popularity during this period is attributed to the highly controversial process of Desafuero against Andrés Manuel López Obrador beginning in May 2004, when the Attorney General of the Republic, supported by the Federal Government, accused López Obrador, then Mayor of Mexico City, of disobeying a federal judge's order regarding an expropriation case, and requested both the removal (desafuero) of López Obrador's constitutional legal immunity and his dismissal as Mayor of Mexico City. Due to López Obrador's very high approval ratings in Mexico City and the fact that Fox himself had harshly criticized his administration on previous occasions, López Obrador's supporters protested the desafuero process and accused Fox of trying to prevent López Obrador from participating in the 2006 presidential elections (given that if he was officially charged, López Obrador would have lost all of his civil rights, including the right to run for the Presidency in 2006, unless he was either quickly acquitted of all charges or managed to serve his sentence before the electoral registration deadline). The process went on for 12 months, and was nearly unanimously criticized by national and foreign media, climaxing in April 2005. On 7 April, the Chamber of Deputies voted by 360 to 127 (with two abstentions) to lift López Obrador's constitutional immunity; nonetheless, after a massive rally in support of López Obrador took place in Mexico City on 24 April 2005, with an attendance exceeding one million people (at the time, the biggest political manifestation in recent Mexican history) Fox decided to stop the judicial process against López Obrador.
- May 2005 registered the lowest approval rating for Fox (35% approval, 59% disapproval, 6% unsure) in the aftermath of both the chaotic Desafuero process and the controversial comments made by Fox regarding African Americans that same month.

==== Controversial comments ====
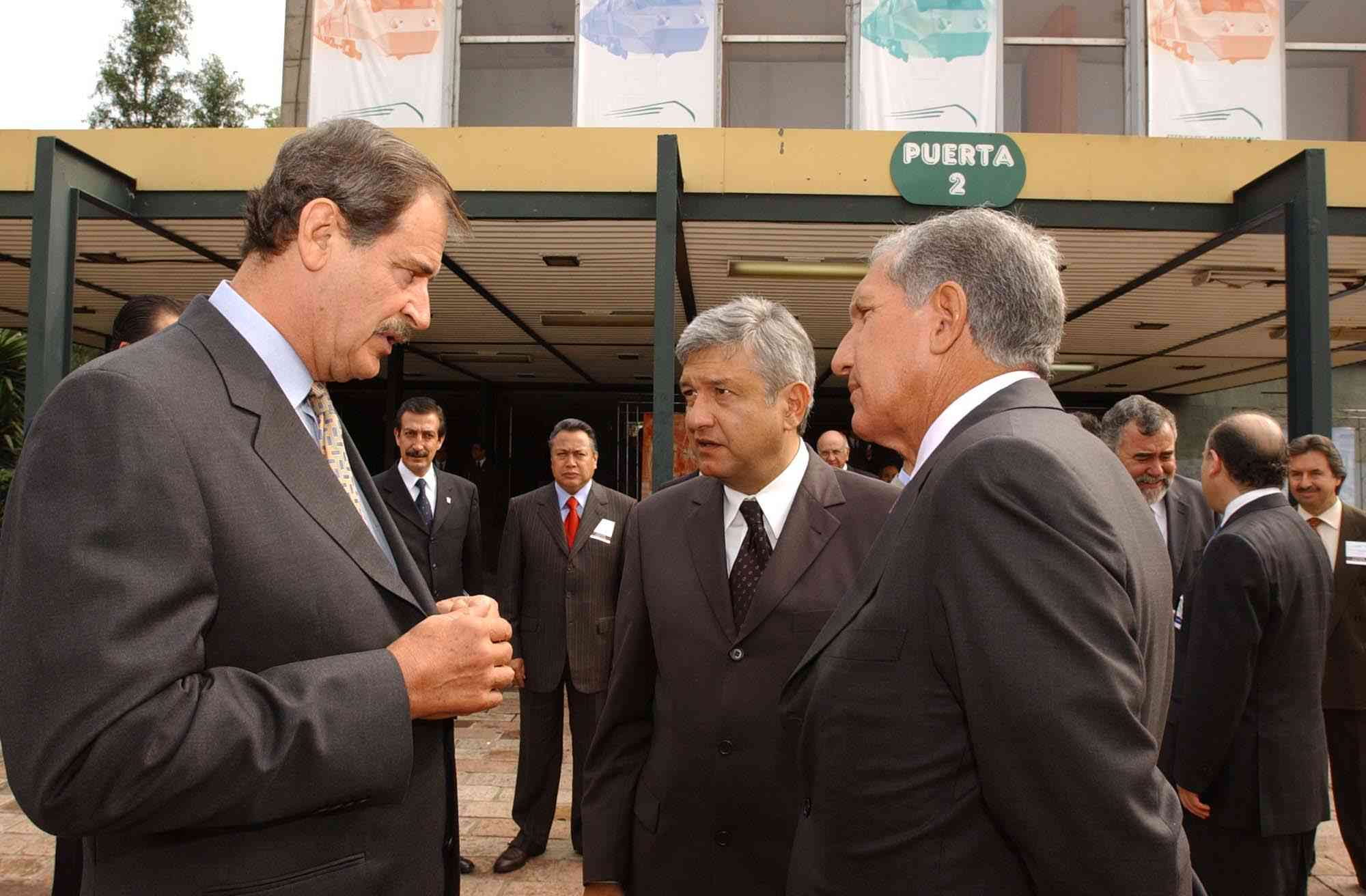
Fox (left) with López Obrador (center) and former México State governor Arturo Montiel (right) in June 2003

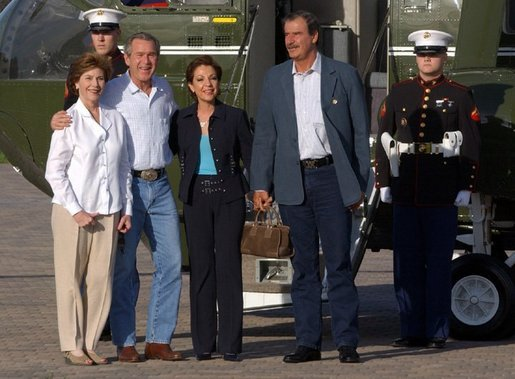
Fox and his wife Marta with US President George W. Bush and First Lady Laura Bush in Crawford, Texas, March 2004

- In March 2002, two days prior to the International Conference on Financing for Development held in Monterrey, Nuevo León, Fox called Cuban President Fidel Castro and instructed him to limit his comments about the United States and suggested that Castro leave Mexico after he delivered his speech and ate his meal. Castro later called this a "despicable betrayal."
- In May 2005, a controversy arose over comments Fox made during a meeting with Texas business people in which he said, "There is no doubt that Mexicans, filled with dignity, willingness and ability to work, are doing jobs that not even blacks want to do there in the United States." This angered African-Americans in the United States, prompting many black leaders to demand an apology from Fox. Reverend Al Sharpton requested a formal apology from Fox to the African-American community and called for an economic boycott of Mexican products until an apology was received. Sharpton, along with many African-Americans felt that Fox's comments were insensitive and racist. Reverend Jesse Jackson, during a news conference concerning Fox's statement about African-Americans, said that he felt that the comments were, "unwitting, unnecessary and inappropriate," and added that "[Fox's] statement had the impact of being inciting and divisive."
- Fox was also known to have mispronounced the name of Argentine writer Jorge Luis Borges (/ˈbɔːrhɛs/ BOR-hess;) as "José Luis Borgues" in the Royal Congress of the Spanish Language. This error sparked accusations of an "uncultured" President.
- On 30 May 2005, President Fox told reporters that the majority of the female homicides in Ciudad Juárez had been resolved and the perpetrators placed behind bars. He went on to criticize the media for "rehashing" the same 300 or 400 murders, and said matters needed to be seen in their "proper dimension."
- In 2006, after Bolivian President Evo Morales refused to sell natural gas, Fox said, "Well, they'll either have to consume it all themselves or they're going to have to eat it."
- On 8 March 2006, in the wake of the murder of Canadians Domenico and Nancy Ianiero at a resort in Cancún, Fox said there was evidence that pointed to Canadian suspects from Thunder Bay, in an apparent attempt to portray Cancún as a safe vacation resort. Fox's comments were criticized by the Ianieros' lawyer Edward Greenspan for compromising the investigation, which the Canadian press characterized as mishandled by Mexican authorities. Thereafter, attorney general Bello Melchor Rodríguez later stated that Canadians were never considered as suspects.
- In November 2006, the TV network Telemundo released a video of a previously recorded interview with President Fox in which he stated: "Ya hoy hablo libre, ya digo cualquier tontería, ya no importa, ya total, yo ya me voy" which means "Now, I speak freely. Now, I say whatever nonsense. It doesn't matter anymore. Anyway, I'm already leaving." Then, during the interview he talked about the violent situation in Oaxaca. The President's office complained about the release of this footage and said he was not aware of the camera and microphones being turned on. News agency EFE accused Telemundo of acting unethically, because the video was EFE's intellectual property.
- In 2006, Fox decided to cancel the parade commemorating the 96th anniversary of the Mexican Revolution which was scheduled to take place on 20 November, arguing it was an obsolete celebration that nobody wanted to participate in any more. Some commentators considered that this was a response to Andrés Manuel López Obrador's assumption of an alternative presidency to take place the same day. Others considered Fox's move a smart decision, while others viewed it as a sign of political weakness.
- In a lecture in the United States, in which he was a keynote speaker, he identified Peruvian writer Mario Vargas Llosa as a Colombian Nobel laureate (Spanish by naturalization). At the time, however, Vargas Llosa was not a Nobel Laureate. Later, in October 2010, Fox congratulated Vargas Llosa on Twitter for winning the Nobel Prize in Literature, but he incorrectly attributed the Nobel Prize to Jorge Luis Borges.

=== Legacy and assessment ===
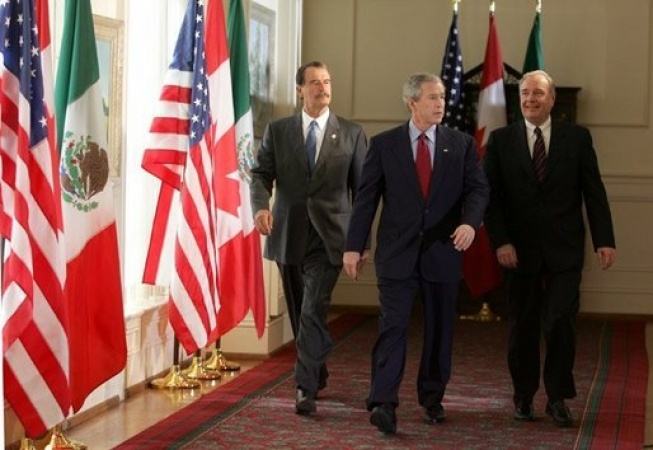
Fox with US President George W. Bush and Canadian Prime Minister Paul Martin

Although Fox's victory in the 2000 election and the end of seven decades of PRI rule raised great expectations of change among the Mexican people, his administration was criticized for failing to fulfill those expectations, as little progress was made in fighting corruption, crime, poverty, unemployment and inequality. Few key reforms were implemented during the Fox administration, which became characterised by a growing sense of power vacuum as Fox was increasingly perceived by Mexican society and political actors as a "lame duck" incapable of pushing the ambitious reform agenda that swept him into power in 2000. Alejandro Cacho points out that "Fox incarnated the hope of alternancy [...] and he managed to kick the PRI out of Los Pinos, but his government was a disappointment. Corruption persisted; in fact, his sons-in-law (the Bribiesca-Sahagún brothers) became rich quickly and without explanation. The economy wasn't much better than it had been under Ernesto Zedillo, the wages didn't increase significantly, neither did jobs. His "super cabinet" ["gabinetazo", as Fox himself referred to it] created more controversy than it did good results. His wife, Marta Sahagún, had a big influence in the presidential decisions".

Having assumed office with an approval rating of 80%, by the time he left office in 2006 his public image had become exhausted by the controversial presidential elections of that year and the few reforms implemented.

In terms of the significance of Fox's presidency, historian Philip Russell asserts that, "Marketed on television, Fox made a far better candidate than he did president. He failed to take charge and provide cabinet leadership, failed to set priorities, and turned a blind eye to alliance building." Fox himself asserted in 2001 (one year into his administration) that he much preferred his experience as candidate than actually being president.

Russell also pointed to 2006 comments by political scientist Soledad Loaeza, who noted, "The eager candidate became a reluctant president who avoided tough choices and appeared hesitant and unable to hide the weariness caused by the responsibilities and constraints of the office." Russell also asserted that Fox "had little success in fighting crime. Even though he maintained the macroeconomic stability inherited from his predecessor, economic growth barely exceeded the rate of population increase. Similarly, the lack of fiscal reform left tax collection at a rate similar to that of Haiti . . . ." Finally, Russell noted that "during Fox's administration, only 1.4 million formal-sector jobs were created, leading to massive immigration to the United States and an explosive increase in informal employment." Ultimately, however, Russell concluded that Fox will be viewed by history as a transitional figure who was able to defeat one of Mexico's long-entrenched political parties.

In a national survey conducted in 2012 by BGC-Excelsior regarding former presidents, 32% of the respondents considered that the Fox administration was "very good" or "good", 25% responded that it was an "average" administration, and 42% responded that it was a "very bad" or "bad" administration.

== Post-presidential life ==
=== Public speaking and advocacy ===
Since leaving office in December 2006, Fox has maintained himself in the public eye by speaking in countries such as Nigeria, Ireland, Canada, and the United States about topics such as the controversial 2006 election and the Iraq War. In Mexico, Fox has been criticized by some for his busy post-presidency since former Mexican presidents are traditionally expected to stay out of the political spotlight. In response, Fox has stated, "There is no reason to hold to the anti-democratic rules of those who still live in the authoritarian past . . . now that Mexico is a democracy, every citizen has the right to express himself, even a former president."

Fox joined four other Latin American presidents at the One Young World Summit in 2014 in Dublin, Ireland, to discuss the Telefónica Millennial Survey. He told those in the audience that eradicating corruption "has to start with education" and that his focus is now on promoting leadership.

Vicente Fox is a member of the Global Leadership Foundation, a not-for-profit organization that offers, discreetly and confidentially, a range of experienced advisors to political leaders facing difficult situations.

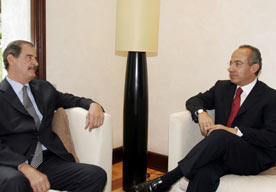
Fox with Felipe Calderón Hinojosa

In 2013, Fox discussed why the West has pursued a moral crusade against drugs at HowTheLightGetsIn festival in Hay-on-Wye. with Chris Bryant and John Ralston Saul. The three debated whether it is hypocritical to ban certain drugs while continuing to export others such as alcohol and tobacco, and whether to follow the lead of Washington and Colorado states in the U.S. and allow the free trading of drugs.

Vicente Fox gave a video interview in July 2013 to High Times, in which he discussed the failure of drug prohibition, and cited Portugal's decriminalization policies as "working splendid(ly)." He said he supports drug legalization despite not being a user himself, just as he said he also "fully respects" same-sex marriage although he does not personally agree with it.

In February 2014, Fox wrote an opinion piece that was published in Toronto's The Globe and Mail in which he stated that, "Legalization of not just marijuana, but all drugs, is the right thing to do." He also said that "we must be given the very freedom to decide our own behaviour and to act responsibly, as long as we do not detrimentally affect the rights of others".

In 2016, Fox co-signed a letter to Ban Ki-moon calling for a more humane drug policy.

In July 2017, Fox was an international observer to the unofficial Venezuelan referendum held by the opposition. During the trip, Fox gave a speech that compared the referendum to the 2000 Mexican elections. He said that "this battle has been won" and "step by step, vote by vote, the dictator will leave." He was subsequently declared a persona non grata by the Venezuelan government. Venezuelan Foreign Minister Samuel Moncada said that Fox had taken advantage of the country's hospitality and "was paid to come to Venezuela to promote violence and the intervention of foreign powers." Moncada said the ban came from Maduro and criticized Fox and the other former Latin American leaders invited as observers (Andrés Pastrana, Jorge Quiroga, Laura Chinchilla and Miguel Ángel Rodríguez) as "political sicarios," "clowns" and "mercenaries" that "sell themselves to the highest bidder to go to various destinations and repeat what they are told." Fox said he was not surprised by the ban and that the vote would weaken Maduro.

In 2018, Fox joined the High Times board of directors. He left the board in 2020 over concerns surrounding the company's stock offering. He supported Javier Milei in 2023 Argentine general election.

In November 2026, regarding the 2006 election results, Fox said in an interview with The Objective: "I made sure Calderón won, although it's not very democratic to say that, but I told myself that the country's leadership should remain in the hands of my party". Fox later said that his words had been taken out of context and that he referred that Calderón won because of "[Fox's] strong performance" as president.

=== Criticism of Donald Trump ===
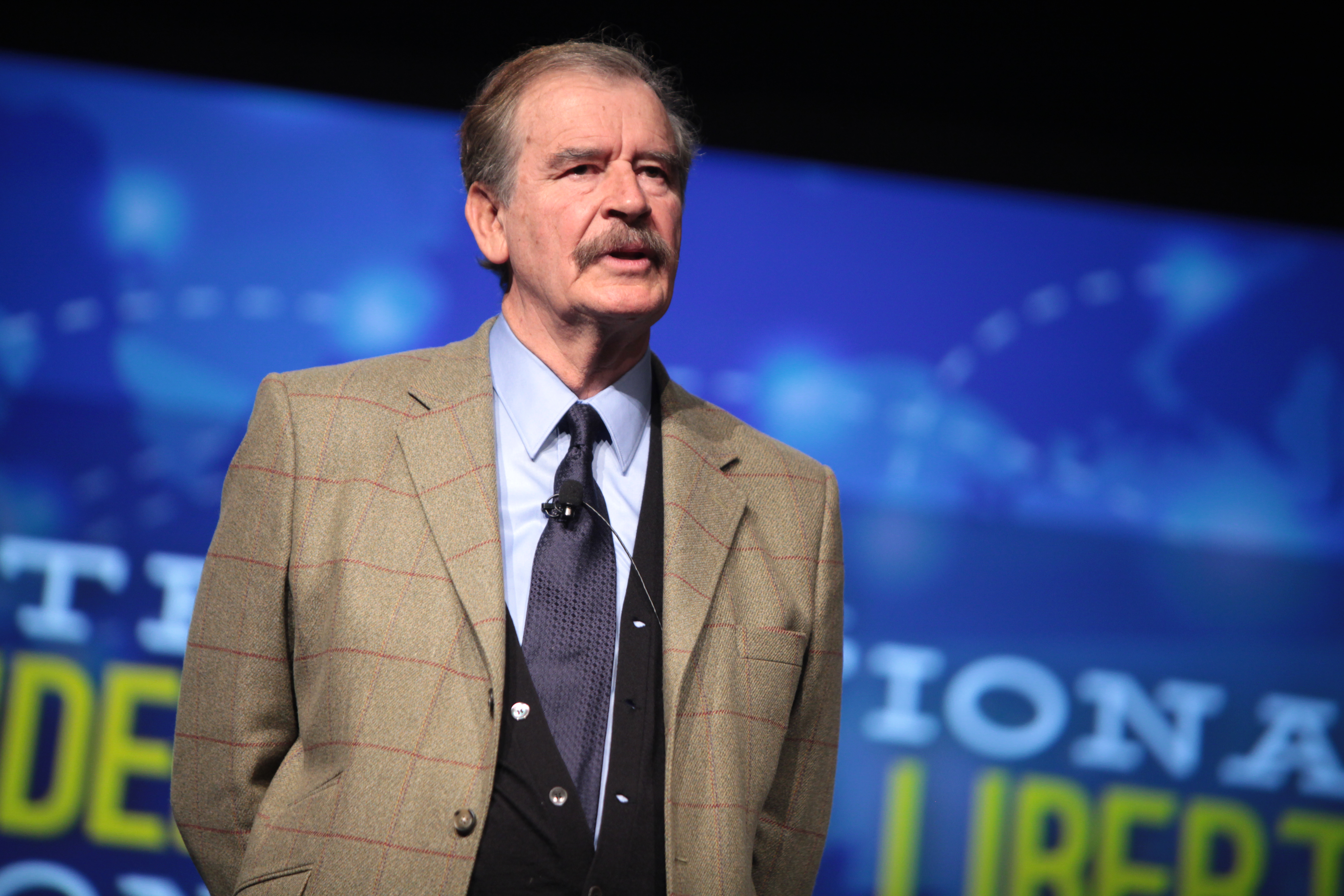
Fox speaking in Washington, D.C., February 2015

Fox has been an outspoken critic of U.S. President Donald Trump, beginning with Trump's bid for the Republican candidacy in the 2016 presidential election.

In an interview with Univision's Jorge Ramos in February 2016, Fox responded to then-candidate Trump's proposal to build a wall at the border between the United States and Mexico at Mexico's expense, declaring in English, "I am not going to pay for that fucking wall. He should pay for it. He's got the money." Fox went on to call Trump a "crazy guy" and a "false prophet," and questioned the claim that Trump received 44% of the Hispanic vote in the Republican caucus in Nevada. Trump took to Twitter in response, demanding that Fox apologize for using "the F word while discussing the wall." Fox eventually apologized for the remark, while also asking for Trump to apologize for his remarks about Mexicans and inviting Trump to visit Mexico.

Despite his apology, Fox continued to criticize Trump to the international media and troll Trump on Twitter, stating, "I'm committed to be Donald Trump's shadow until he is done with politics." Fox would later go on to congratulate President-elect Joe Biden and his victory in the 2020 United States presidential election, defeating Trump. When Trump visited Mexico on 31 August 2016 upon President Enrique Peña Nieto's invitation, Fox slammed the visit, calling it a "desperate move" on the part of Peña Nieto and stating, "He is not welcome in Mexico. We don't like him. We don't want him. We reject his visit." Trump responded by pointing out Fox's previous invitation, to which Fox clarified that he invited Trump to Mexico on the condition that he used the visit to apologize to the Mexican people. He directly addressed the American people the next day on CNN, where he described Trump as a "false prophet" who is "absolutely crazy" and warned that they need to "wake up" and realize the harm that Trump's immigration and economic policies would inflict on the United States.

Later in September 2016, The Washington Post reported that Fox had received multiple emails from Trump's campaign soliciting donations throughout the month. Fox received the first email on 9 September, which he posted on Twitter and responded, "Donald Trump, I won't pay for that fucking wall! Also, campaigning in Mexico? Running out of money and friends?" Fox received two additional emails on 24 and 27 September, both of which he also posted on Twitter and mocked as being "desperate" and "begging." The revelation of the emails has raised concern, as accepting campaign donations from foreign nationals is illegal in the United States.

During a September 2016 appearance on the radio show El Show de Piolín, Fox smashed a Trump piñata hanging on the streets of Los Angeles while loudly singing the traditional Piñata song. Upon breaking it open, Fox noted its lack of contents and remarked, "Empty. Totally Empty. He doesn't have any brains." Discussing the event during a subsequent interview with GQ, Fox expanded, "I had such a joy in my heart by doing that, because in Mexico, piñatas are very meaningful. Piñatas are a celebration. Piñatas let you send messages. And the message is: Trump is empty inside. He's empty in his head. That's why I put my hand into his head. There was no brain there. That's what he is, an empty person."

The day after Trump won the election, Fox wrote an editorial on the International Business Times website where he lamented Trump's victory and explored what Mexico could do in response. "Even though Trump is not the prettiest person in the room, we still have to dance with him. Now, we ought to look out for ourselves and find a way to work with the most powerful economy in the world, which is now led by an authoritarian racist[...]Donald Trump's promises have an expiration date. When the time comes to truly deliver to the American people, his "billion dollar show" will finally crumble beneath his feet," Fox wrote, concluding his editorial with, "I find quite sad that America, formerly the most open and cutting edge nation, has chosen to lock itself down inside concrete walls. It's tragic that fear, anger and wrath took over and pierced the hearts of their people. It will be hard to recover from this wound; but we better start working to heal as quickly as possible – and bring down the walls that blinded us in the beginning."

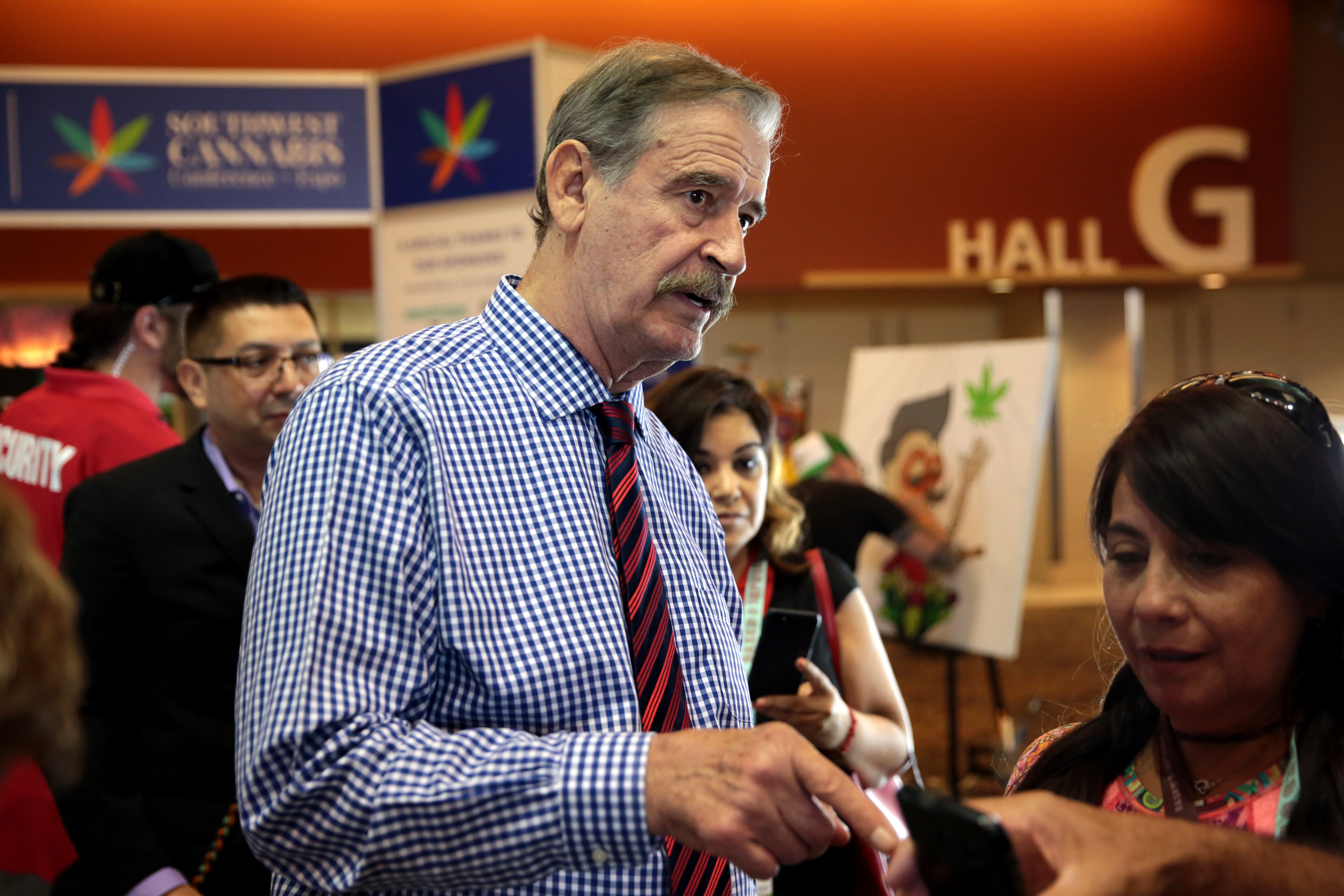
Fox at an event in Phoenix, Arizona in October 2017 to meet with Hispanic Americans

Fox has continued criticizing Trump on Twitter after the election. In a series of tweets in January 2017, Fox again criticized Trump's proposed Mexican border wall, calling it a "racist monument" and insisted that Mexico will never fund it, calling on Trump to "be honest with US taxpayers" about that fact. Following the release of a U.S. government intelligence report that accused Russia of interfering in the 2016 election to ensure Trump's victory, Fox tweeted, "Sr Trump, the intelligence report is devastating. Losing election by more than 3M votes and in addition this. Are you a legitimate president?" Fox further criticized Trump's response to the intelligence report, calling him a "bully" and a "bluff" and stating that Trump is "bringing in a new era of dictatorship." Though on 12 January, Fox broke with his criticism of Trump and simply tweeted, "America Will Survive."

In an interview with Anderson Cooper on 25 January 2017, and during an appearance on Conan O'Brien's late night talk show on 1 March 2017, Fox again asserted that Mexico should not have to pay for the wall.

In September 2017, Fox was once again in the news after President Trump announced he would end the Deferred Action for Childhood Arrivals (DACA) program in six months if the U.S. congress failed to pass legislation to address the issue. In response, Fox tweeted to President Trump's Twitter account, "Ending DACA is on the top of the vilest acts you've pulled off. You're destroying the legacy of greater men before you." In another tweet, Fox suggested that President Trump's DACA decision was a result of him compensating for earlier failures to pass healthcare legislation to replace the Affordable Care Act. Fox then went on to post a video in which he claimed that President Trump had "failed America" and stated that "[t]his measure is cruel and heartless, worse than any machine. You're cancelling the future of 800,000 children and young people."

Since May 2017, Fox has appeared in a series of humorous videos seriously denouncing Donald Trump, including "Vicente Fox is Running for President of the United States" (fake announcement for the candidacy) which was released in September.

=== Autobiography ===
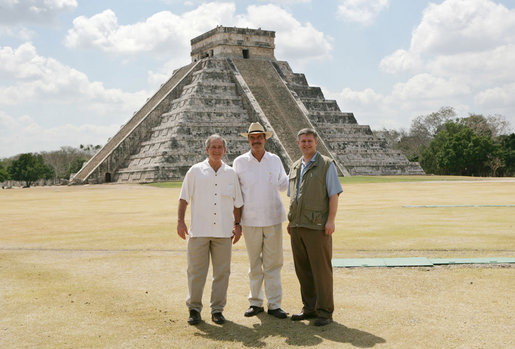
Fox with US President George W. Bush and Canadian Prime Minister Stephen Harper in front of "El Castillo" in Chichén Itzá, March 2006

Fox's autobiography, entitled Revolution of Hope: The Life, Faith and Dreams of a Mexican President, was released in September 2007. To promote its release, Fox toured many U.S. cities to do book-signings and interviews with U.S. media. During his tour, however, he faced protests from Mexican immigrants who accused him of actions that forced them to emigrate and find jobs in the United States. He faced the subject several times during interviews, such as one held with Fox News's Bill O'Reilly, who questioned him about the massive illegal immigration problem of Mexicans into the United States. Finally, during an interview with Telemundo's Rubén Luengas, the interviewer asked Fox about allegations concerning some properties of Vicente Fox's wife, Marta Sahagún. After Fox explained the situation, he asked the interviewer not to make false accusations and to prove what he was saying. Luengas said, "I'm telling you in your face, I'm not a liar." After this, Fox walked out of the studio, calling the interviewer a "liar," "vulgar," and "stupid."

Upon the book's release, some readers viewed several excerpts as being highly critical of U.S. President George W. Bush, considered by many to be a close friend. For example, Fox wrote that Bush was "the cockiest guy I have ever met in my life," and claimed that he was surprised that Bush had ever made it to the White House. Later, in an interview with Larry King, Fox explained that this was a misunderstanding and that what he meant by calling George W. Bush "cocky" was to say he was "confident." Fox also referred to Bush in his autobiography as a "windshield cowboy," due to Bush's apparent fear of a horse Fox offered him to ride.

=== Fox Center of Studies, Library and Museum ===
See: Vicente Fox Center of Studies, Library and Museum

On 12 January 2007, over a month after he left office, Fox announced the construction of a center of studies, library and museum that was labeled by the U.S. press as Mexico's first presidential library. The project will be a library, museum, a center for the advancement of democracy, a study center and a hotel, and it will be completely privately funded. It is expected to be a genuine U.S.-style presidential library. It will be built in Fox's home state of Guanajuato, in his home town of San Francisco del Rincón.

While museums are abundant throughout the country, there is nothing comparable to a presidential library where personal documents, records, and gifts amassed by the country's leader are open to the public. Fox's library will be modeled after the Bill Clinton Library in Little Rock, Arkansas, which, according to the former president, will allow Mexicans to enjoy, for the first time in Mexico's history, a library in which to review the documents, images and records that made up his six years as president.

According to the official website, the construction of the center is in progress and advancing. Final completion of the library was expected by late 2007.

In 2015, Fox was interviewed by Peter High for Forbes at the library, which is called "Centro Fox" (the Fox Center). During the interview, Fox remarked that the guiding principle behind the library is that "[w]e are a Latin American center that is geared around ideas, leadership, and strategies. We do it through, number one, young kids. The middle-upper class and the rest have access to the best universities. But the broader constituency does not receive any messages or aspirations of happiness in life at home."

In addition to the library's completion, there has been some indications that Centro Fox was joining hands with UST Global to transform Mexico into a world-class technological economy. Fox stated in a press release that "UST Global is partnering Centro Fox to help accomplish nothing less than the transformation of my country into a world-class technology economy . . . . Together, we will establish Mexico at the forefront of the information technology revolution in the region." These efforts appear to be ongoing.

=== Centrist Democratic International ===
On 20 September 2007, Fox was elected co-president of the Centrist Democratic International (along with the re-elected Pier Ferdinando Casini) at its leaders' meeting in Rome. The CDI is the international organization of political parties that counts Fox's party, the National Action Party, as a member.

=== Statue controversy ===
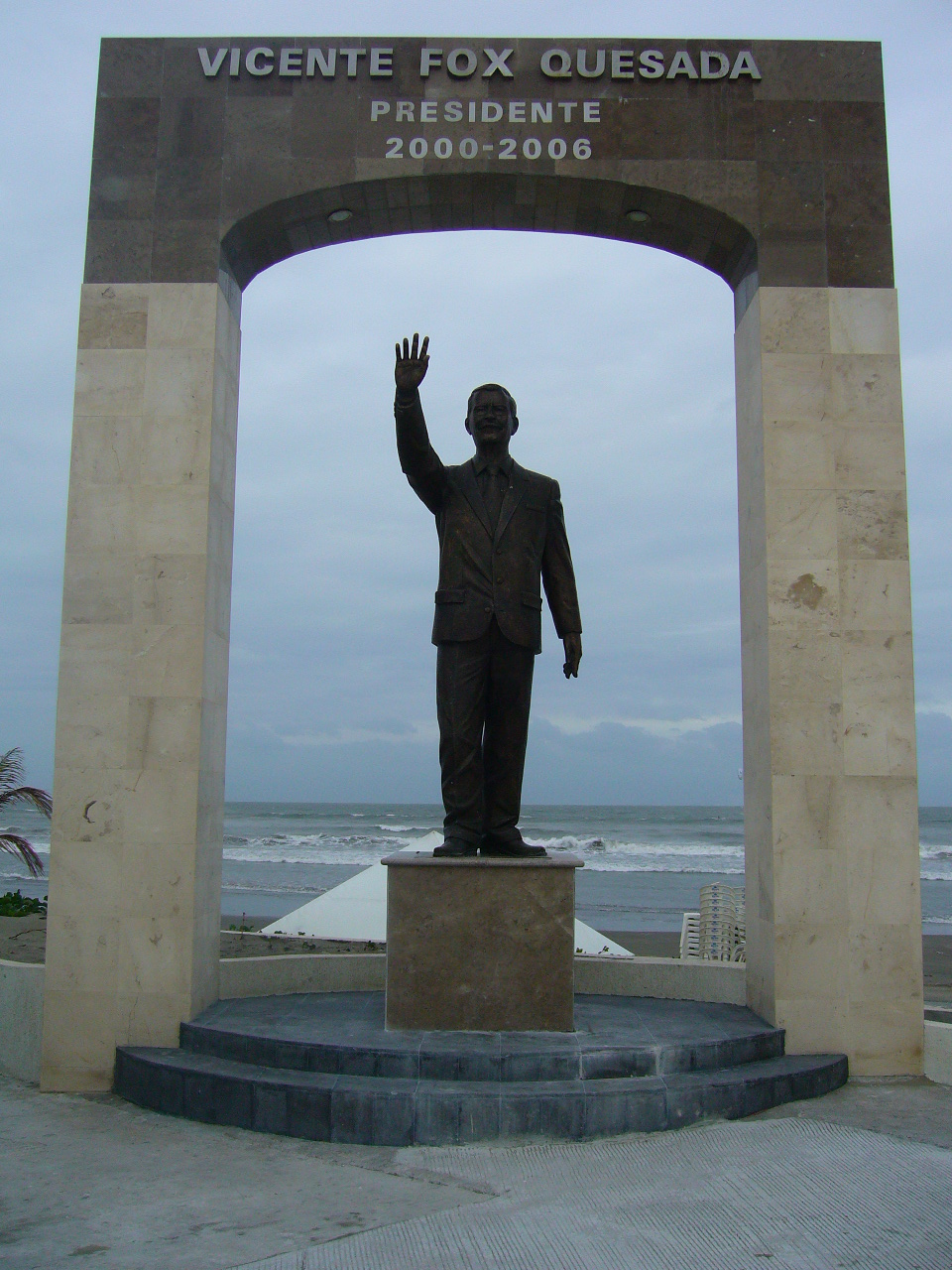
Statue of Vicente Fox in Boca del Río, Veracruz

In October 2007, an announcement was made in the municipality of Boca del Río, Veracruz, that a 3-meter (10 ft) statue of Vicente Fox was to be erected to honor the former president. This aroused criticism from the opposition Party of the Democratic Revolution towards Boca del Río's mayor, who was affiliated with the same political party (PAN) as Fox.

The statue was put in place amidst protests on the dawn of 13 October 2007. The inauguration was to have been held on 14 October. Some hours after the statue was erected, a crowd of about 100 people (many of whom were members of the PRI, the political party opposed to Fox and which Fox had defeated in the 2000 election) brought the statue down by putting a rope around the statue's neck and pulling it down, damaging it. The statue was put back in place for the inauguration, then taken away for repairs.

PAN members accused Veracruz's governor, Fidel Herrera Beltrán, of "ordering the attack on the statue," and Fox called the governor intolerant. Others in the media argued that the installation of the statue was inappropriate, since former President Fox was facing allegations relating to an illicit enrichment scandal at the time.

=== Health ===
On 7 August 2021, it was reported and confirmed that Vicente Fox and his wife Martha Sahagún were preventively admitted to a hospital in León, Guanajuato after being infected with COVID-19 during the pandemic in Mexico, but without serious symptoms.

=== 2023 antisemitic controversy ===
Fox stirred controversy in July 2023 when he shared an image on his Twitter account criticizing some of the Morena contenders for the 2024 presidential elections and supporting the PAN pre-candidate Xóchitl Gálvez. The image, which made reference to the contenders' ancestries, read: "Sheinbaum is a Bulgarian Jew, Marcelo is a French fifí, Noroña is an alien and Adán Augusto is from Transylvania. The only one who's Mexican is Xóchitl!". Fox was immediately criticized and accused of being antisemitic and xenophobic by social media users and politicians, even from those belonging to the PAN and the opposition to Morena, who noted that the former President himself was of German and Spanish ancestry. Eventually Xóchitl Gálvez herself condemned the tweet. Fox later deleted the image and on July 23 he apologized to the Jewish community, stating that he had not created the image and had merely retweeted it, and affirming that he had a "profound respect for the Jewish community".

=== Response to the 2025 Mexican protests ===
In response to the 2025 Mexican protests, Fox framed the protests as a "great homage" to Carlos Manzo.

== Honors ==
- Collar of the Order of the Liberator General San Martín (Argentina)
- Grand Cross of the Order of Merit of the Republic of Poland (2004)
- Grand Star of the Decoration of Honour for Services to the Republic of Austria (Austria, 2005)
- Grand Cross of the Order of Vytautas the Great (Lithuania, 14 January 2002)
- Honorary Knight Grand Cross of the Order of St Michael and St George (United Kingdom)
- Collar of the Order of Isabella the Catholic (Spain, 8 November 2002)
- Knight of the Royal Order of the Seraphim (Sweden, 22 October 2002)

== See also ==
- History of Mexico
- List of presidents of Mexico
- Politics of Mexico

Chamber of Deputies (Mexico)
| Preceded by Héctor Hugo Varela Flores | Member of the Chamber of Deputies for the 3rd district of Guanajuato; 1988–1991 | Succeeded by Luis Arturo Torres del Valle |
Party political offices
| Preceded by Diego Fernández de Cevallos | PAN nominee for President of Mexico; 2000 | Succeeded by Felipe Calderón |
Political offices
| Preceded by Ernesto Zedillo | President of Mexico; 2000–2006 | Succeeded by Felipe Calderón |
| Unknown | Co-President of Centrist Democrat International; 2006–present | Incumbent |
Diplomatic posts
| Preceded by Jiang Zemin | Chairperson of APEC; 2002 | Succeeded by Thaksin Shinawatra |
