= How the Light Gets In =

How the Light Gets In may refer to

- How the Light Gets In, a 2004 novel by M. J. Hyland
- How the Light Gets In, a 2019 play directed by Emilie Pascale Beck.
- HowTheLightGetsIn, an annual philosophy and music festival in Hay-on-Wye, Wales
