= Héctor Hugo Varela Flores =

Mexican politician

Deputy of the Congress of the Union for the 3rd district of Guanajuato
- In office 1 September 1985 – 31 August 1988
- Preceded by: Gregorio López García
- Succeeded by: Vicente Fox Quesada

Personal details
- Born: León, Guanajuato, Mexico
- Party: PRI
- Education: University of Guanajuato
- Occupation: Politician

Héctor Hugo Varela Flores is a Mexican politician affiliated with the Institutional Revolutionary Party (PRI). In the 1985 mid-terms, he was elected to the Chamber of Deputies to represent Guanajuato's 3rd district during the 53rd session of Congress.

Chamber of Deputies (Mexico)
Preceded by Gregorio López García	3rd district of Guanajuato; 1985–1988	Succeeded by Vicente Fox Quesada
