= Institute of Art and Ideas =

British philosophy organisation

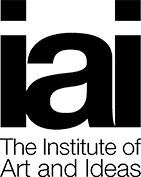
- Formation: 2008; 18 years ago
- Location: Hay-on-Wye, Wales, UK
- Website: www.iai.tv

The Institute of Art and Ideas (IAI) is a British philosophy organisation founded in 2008. It operates the HowTheLightGetsIn philosophy and music festival.

== Overview ==
The IAI is an organisation with the stated aim of "rescuing philosophy from technical debates about the meaning of words and returning it to big ideas and putting them at the centre of culture." As such, the Institute runs a website, IAI.tv, which provides articles, courses and podcasts by various scholars and intellectuals on the topics of philosophy, science, politics and the arts. The IAI is also responsible for organising the bi-annual festival HowTheLightGetsIn, the biggest philosophy and music festival in the world aimed at "tackling the death of philosophy in daily life", in addition to monthly IAI Live events.

The IAI was founded by philosopher Hilary Lawson with a mission to explore "the cracks in our thinking, in order to change how we think and how we change the world". The IAI's first festival, Crunch, focussed on the visual arts and was held in November 2008 in the wake of the financial crash. In May 2009, the IAI held its first philosophy festival HowTheLightGetsIn in the book town of Hay-on-Wye.

The IAI's festival HowTheLightGetsIn is held in Hay-on-Wye in May and in London at Kenwood House, Hampstead Heath, in September. Described by Yahoo UK as "a playground for the soul", philosophy and the exchange of ideas are at the heart of the event. The festival formulates its theme and programme around debates with headline speakers and live talks, in addition to live bands and soloists, comedy, cabaret and DJs. Speakers have included Noam Chomsky, Steven Pinker, Liz Truss, Roger Penrose, A.S. Byatt, Paul Krugman, Jess Phillips, Rory Stewart, Daniel Dennett, Peter Singer, Kimberlé Crenshaw, Bianca Jagger, and Slavoj Žižek, along with musicians Brian Eno, Clean Bandit, Laura Marling, and comedians James Acaster and Robin Ince.

== IAI TV ==
IAI.tv is an online platform publishing articles, videos and courses. It includes three sources of content: IAI Player, IAI News and IAI Academy.

=== IAI Player ===
IAI Player is an online channel where the debates and talks curated by the IAI and hosted at the HowTheLightGetsIn Festival are released and made available online. Speakers include Nobel Prize winners Paul Krugman, Gerard 't Hooft and Roger Penrose, public intellectuals Noam Chomsky, Kimberlé Crenshaw, Daniel Kahneman, Steven Pinker, Tariq Ali and Simon Armitage, and political figures and journalists Owen Jones, Matt Kennard, Helen Lewis, Diane Abbott and Liz Truss.

=== IAI News ===
IAI News is an online magazine of ideas. It publishes philosophical articles on science, politics, and the arts along with core philosophy themes such as metaphysics and language. The IAI website states that the aim of its content is to rescue "philosophy from technical debates about the meaning of words [by] returning them to big ideas and putting them at the centre of culture." Contributors have included Martha Nussbaum, Homi Bhabha, Massimo Pigliucci, Kimberlé Crenshaw, Catherine Hakim, Hew Strachan, Phillip Goff, Huw Davies, and many hundreds of others.

=== IAI Academy ===
IAI Academy is an educational platform of online courses in philosophy, politics, art and science.

== Philosophy for Our Times ==
Beginning in September 2016, the IAI has published its weekly podcast, Philosophy for our Times, featuring IAI debates and talks from the HowTheLightGetsIn festival. In 2021 the podcast was ranked as the Best UK Philosophy Podcast by FeedSpot, based on traffic, social media followers, domain authority and freshness.
