= Video painting =

Form of video art

Video painting is a form of video art presented via projectors, LCD or other flat panel display and wall-mounted in the same manner as traditional paintings. Video painting was coined by Brian Eno in the 1980s to refer to his experimentations with long-form video art. It was later developed upon by Hilary Lawson.

== History ==
Video painting began as a way for Eno to expand upon the ambient philosophy of his music in a visual form. He explained the coinage and practice of video painting to NME:

"I was delighted to find this other way of using video because at last here's video which draws from another source, which is painting... I call them 'video paintings' because if you say to people 'I make videos', they think of Sting's new rock video or some really boring, grimy 'Video Art'. It's just a way of saying, 'I make videos that don't move very fast."

The idea of video painting was later taken up in Hilary Lawson’s theory of Closure (published 2001), in which he proposed that the world is open and that we close that openness with thought and language. He reinterpreted art as the attempt to avoid closure and approach openness.

Lawson eventually set about creating a narrative-less frame which he hoped would avoid closure. Working with a close friend and artist, Sanchita Islam, a small initial group was formed which also included artists William Raban, Isabelle Inghillieri, Nina Danino, and Tina Keane. The group met regularly and discussed and shared their work.

== Technology ==
Flatscreen technologies such as plasma, LCD, DLP and OLED displays are on the cusp of exploding in terms of marketplace penetration. Currently, the market offers both existing hybrid (video projection boxes) and true flatscreen technologies, and video art projections using cutting-edge projection technology. Even as these devices are being steadily introduced to domestic and creative cultural spheres, more revolutionary technologies are being developed and implemented. Bill Buxton (University of Toronto, former chief scientist for Alias Wave Front and Silicon Graphics) maintains that gel, thin film, and painted surface video technologies are the inevitable next step in this development. Massively large scale moving images, beyond anything we have experienced, will be part of our everyday lives. As a result, our domestic (and public) visual spaces will be profoundly transformed.

There are several artists and designers who are producing video paintings and ambient art that is intended to repurpose the blank space of an idle flatscreen. In addition to this, there is an ever-increasing number of companies specialising in video paintings to varying degrees. Companies such as Plasma Window, Vat19, and Digital Hotcakes have all contributed to this growing phenomenon often providing the archetypal classical ambient video paintings. These companies and increasingly other artists and companies are expanding the availability of this genre. Ambient Digital Art have evolved the concept to more specialised markets including bespoke personalised service additionally with expansion into the realm of generative art.

TransLumen Technologies was founded in 2000 and applied for patents on imperceptibly different images or Subthreshold Extreme Gradual Change (STEGC) also called Fluid Stills Art Illusions. These patents were subsequently awarded and additional patents filed. TransLumen creates and provides ambient video DVD's, HD and custom installations. They specialize in ultra-slow-motion technology and video painting.

Jim Bizzocchi, an artist and assistant professor at Simon Fraser University's School of Interactive Arts and Technology, describes the new form: "Ambient video will emerge as a supremely pictorial form - relying on visual impact and the subtle manipulation of image, layer, flow, and transition. It sits in the visual background of our lives - always changing, but never too quickly. It does not conquer, it seduces. It rewards attention, but never commands it. Rather, its aim is to support whatever level of attention the viewer cares to bestow in the moment: a passing glance, a more intentional look, or a longer and deeper immersion within the dynamically changing experience of an ambient video world." Bizzochi must be credited with advancing the academic study of this phenomenon from his earliest papers on streaming video and other academic papers on video paintings.

NomIg were among the first to create video paintings with their 2001 piece ‘Ad Infinitum’. Working as audiovisual artists, the NomIg. duo questioned what would happen if the concepts of Eno's ambient works were applied to the visual domain. As a result, their works place paramount importance on fluidity of movement; an absence of direct cuts/edits; and the removal of a linear time experience for the viewer. Their video paintings are centered on near-imperceptible movement where the works cause the viewer to question whether there is any movement at all. Upon a passing glance the work appears to be still - it is only after a returning glance or concentrated awareness that the motion of the piece reveals itself. Their work takes a fleeting second and expands it into a timeless contemplation of the moment. To achieve their extreme slow motion NomIg. have heavily researched and developed editing techniques which layer and blend frames while not succumbing to the artifacts of the standard digital slow motion process (jerky movement, blurry content). The actual duration of their paintings often exceeds 3 hours and are regularly produced in 1080p HD format. They are seamless loops.

In 2003, while curating the audiovisual component of the New Forms Festival, the nomigs met Bizzocchi and quickly formed an alliance. Bizzocchi's "Rockface" was used as the intermission piece during the aforementioned audiovisual evening in place of traditional intermission background music thereby playing with the conventional structure of the ambient paradigm. 2004 saw NomIg. and Bizzocchi team up to curate a video painting exhibition at the 2004 New Forms Festival.

Believing that this infant art form needs to develop a strong community, NomIg. developed a dedicated video painting & ambient video resource in an effort to grow the video painting community as well as offer a resource for those looking for information about video painting in general.

2007 sees NomIg. continue to advance the video painting form with a newly developed slow-motion technique; artistic manipulation of the display device itself; as well as the integration of the display device into sculptural works.

Visual artist Jeffers Egan has been working with the video painting medium for some time, producing works described as references to Rothko and Pollock.

Malcolm Daniel (who was involved in the New Forms Festival exhibition mentioned below) has recently started producing a series of work as well. To the rich tapestry of ambient video, Malcolm Daniel adds commentary on culture and society with his Video Paintings. Filmed on location in India, Malcolm's works speak to the integration of society and spiritualism that is so prominent to the region. The cultural significance of this relationship is explored through layering and slow motion effects which serve to foster an ethereal and meditative presence for the viewer.

An early pioneer of the ambient video art movement and video painting is Douglas R. Siefken. His first public exhibit of the Fluid Stills artform was sponsored by Sony on 02/02/02 at the Julia Friedman Gallery in Chicago. Doug is a founder and Chief Technology Officer of TransLumen Technologies, LLC. Their Fluid Stills Art Illusions are a new genre of art merging with technology. The art imbues each digital frame with the integrity of an independent artistic still that cohesively changes over time without any visible or detectable change as that change occurs, creating a serene, temporally streaming subthreshold ultra-slow motion video composition. This tranquil and harmonious art form obviates the visual noise and environmental disruption presented by some other digital art alternatives. Doug has a version of the Chicago Skyline series that was installed at the Hotel Cass, Chicago in August 2007. The piece is running on an 80” DLP screen in the main lobby. In 2008 Chicago's Mayor Daley was flanked by two images from that series on large screens at a luncheon.

One of the early participants in the growing ambient video genre, Detourdvd have been designing ambient video since 2003. Slow moving videos, with no audio track play in infinite loops, the Detourdvd Collection references modern design themes, with some titles available in a choice of color palettes. With sales of flatscreens soaring (Keepmedia), and with the new, sleek screens on display instead of being hidden away in an armoire or closet, more people are searching for sources moving art to display in their homes. As Jim Bizzocchi says, "We believe artists will use the flat-panel displays as frames for "video paintings"—slow moving but highly pictorial works of televisual art that explore light, shape, texture and motion. The next decade will be a rich test-bed for new forms of domestic visual art."

== See also ==
- Video art
- Hilary Lawson
