= HowTheLightGetsIn Festival =

Biannual philosophy and music festival

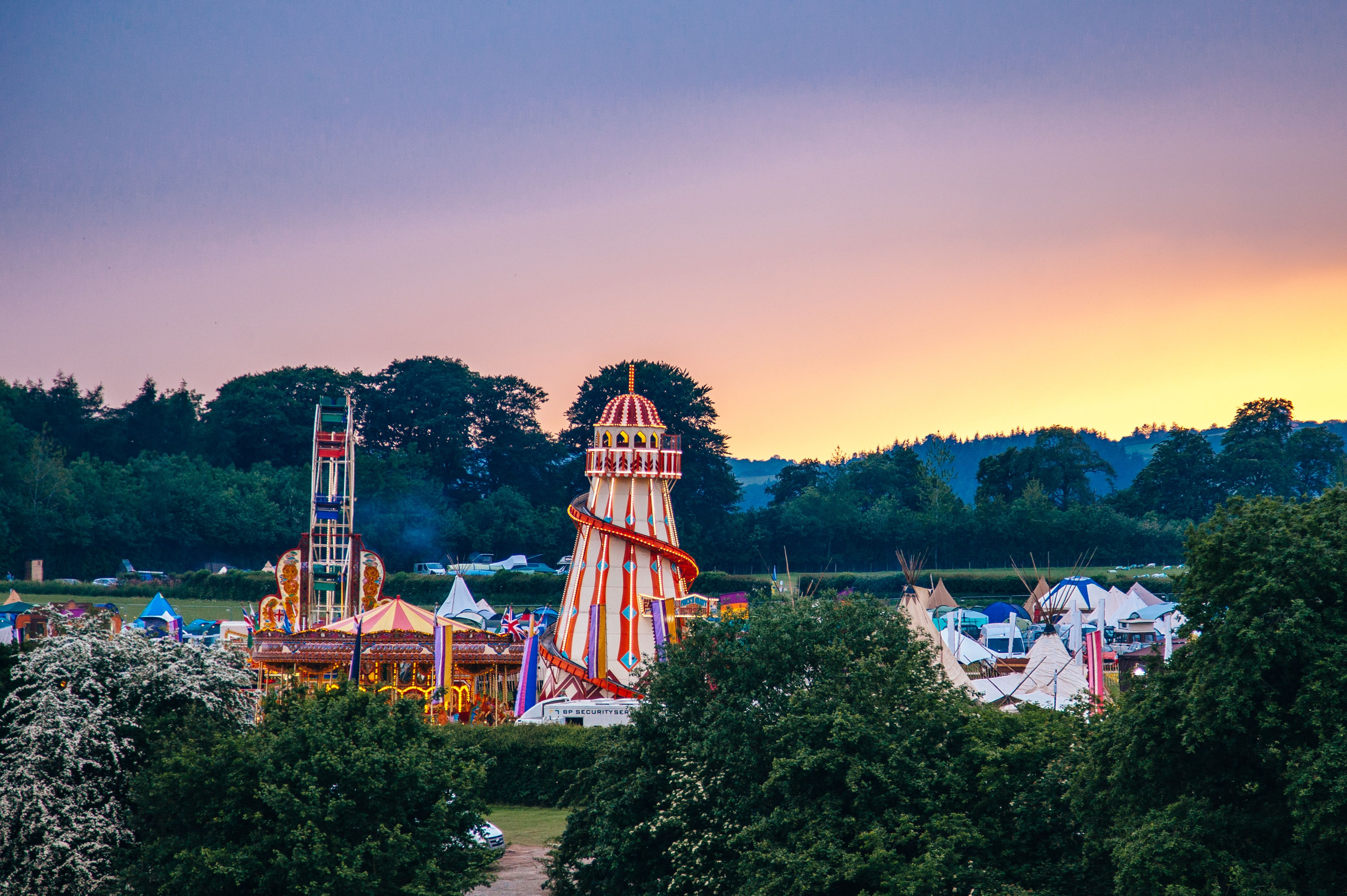
- HowTheLightGetsIn Festival
- Genre: Philosophy, music, comedy, debate
- Frequency: Biannually
- Locations: Hay-on-Wye, Wales / London, England
- Years active: 2008–present
- Previous event: 19–20 September 2020, Online
- Website: howthelightgetsin.org

HowTheLightGetsIn Festival is a philosophy and music festival, hosted by the Institute of Art and Ideas. It aims "to get philosophy out of the academy and into people's lives" by bringing together philosophers, writers, academics, comedians and musicians for a festival of debate, talks, music, workshops, and late night parties.

Speakers at the festival have included Noam Chomsky, Brian Eno, Ed Miliband, Kimberlé Crenshaw, Philip Pullman, Diane Abbott, Robert Skidelsky, Stanley Fish, Steven Pinker and Laurie Penny, among others. Music headliners have included Clean Bandit, Hot Chip, and Donovan. Comedians have included James Acaster, Sarah Pascoe, and Phil Wang.

HowTheLightGetsIn is now hosted twice a year. In May, the festival is normally held in Hay-on-Wye, Powys, Wales at the same time as the Hay Festival, HowTheLightGetsIn attracts a footfall of over 30,000 each year to its setting by the banks of the River Wye. The September festival has been held at Kenwood House in London, and has been running since 2018.

In May 2020, HowTheLightGetsIn launched its first fully online festival.

In September 2020, the festival held its next event: HowTheLightGetsIn Global 2020: Delhi, London, New York. This online festival included 200 events on eight stages, live streamed from Delhi, London and New York, with the aim of giving the festival global reach and making it accessible from all time zones.

Festival will be on 22 to 25 May 2026 in Hay on Wye.

== 2010 Hay, ‘Being Human’ ==
The 2010 festival had author of Politics of Fear Frank Furedi, filmmaker David Bond, author Philip Pullman and Labour politician Jon Cruddas, amongst others.

The Wellcome Trust Identity Project presented an exhibition and two days of events on the topic of Identity. The School of Life hosted a series of philosophy breakfasts with leading thinkers over the 10-day festival.

Radio 1's Huw Stephens and John Rostron, the duo behind the Sŵn Festival, curated a night of music, which was accompanied by live performances from Johnny Flynn, Cate le Bon and Radio 1's Bethan Elfyn.

== 2011 Hay, ‘New Gods: Icons and Ideas in a Changed World’ ==
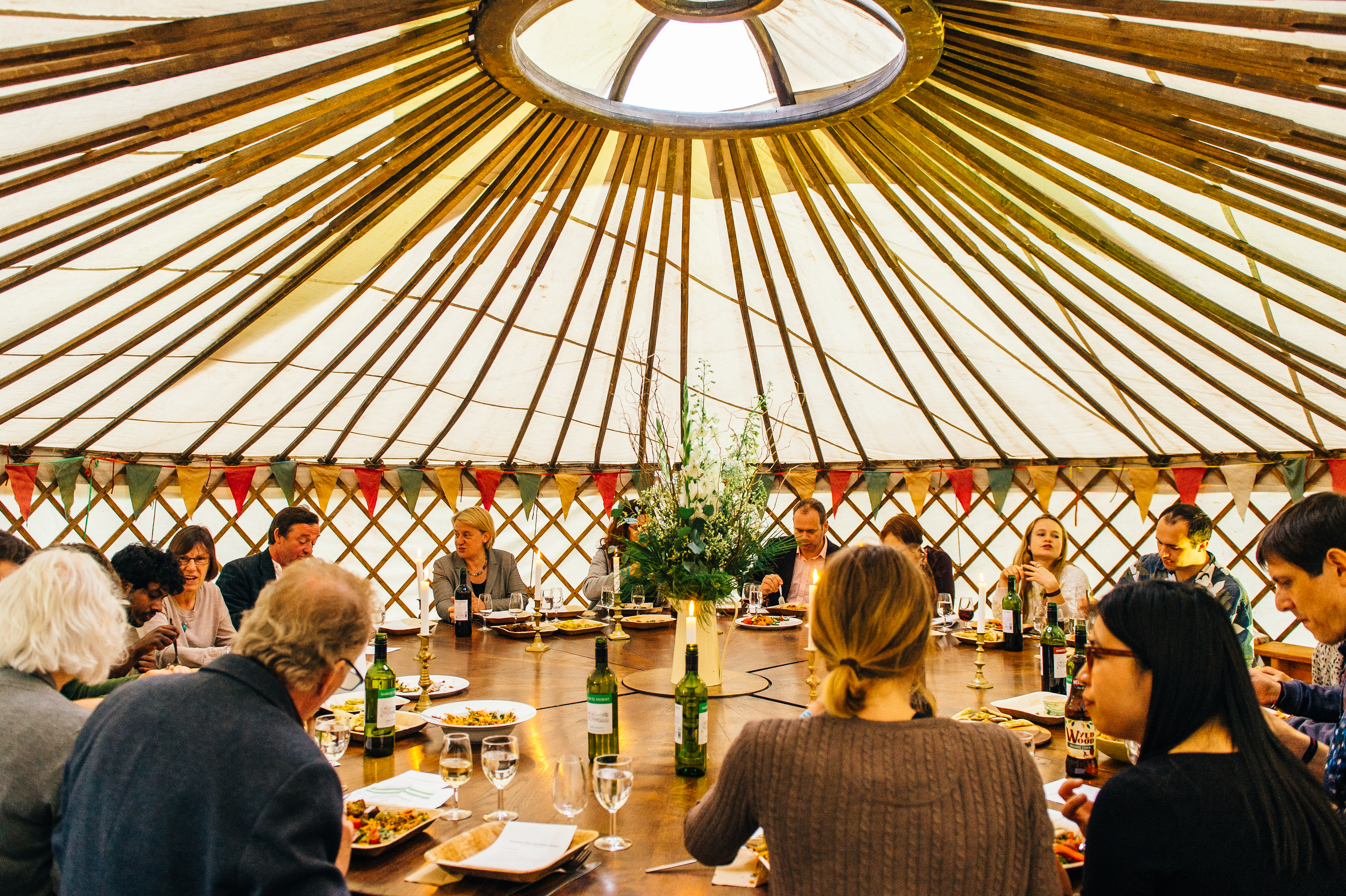
HowTheLightGetsIn Festival 2016

The 2011 festival included critical theorist Leela Gandhi, Times columnist David Aaronovitch, poet Simon Armitage, New Statesman culture editor Jonathan Derbyshire and screenwriter Jez Butterworth.

Festival events ranged from Ghostpoet, Mount Kimbie and The Correspondents, to comedy and the screening of documentaries from around the world with BBC Four.

== 2012 Hay, 'Uncharted Territory: Progress for a New Era' ==
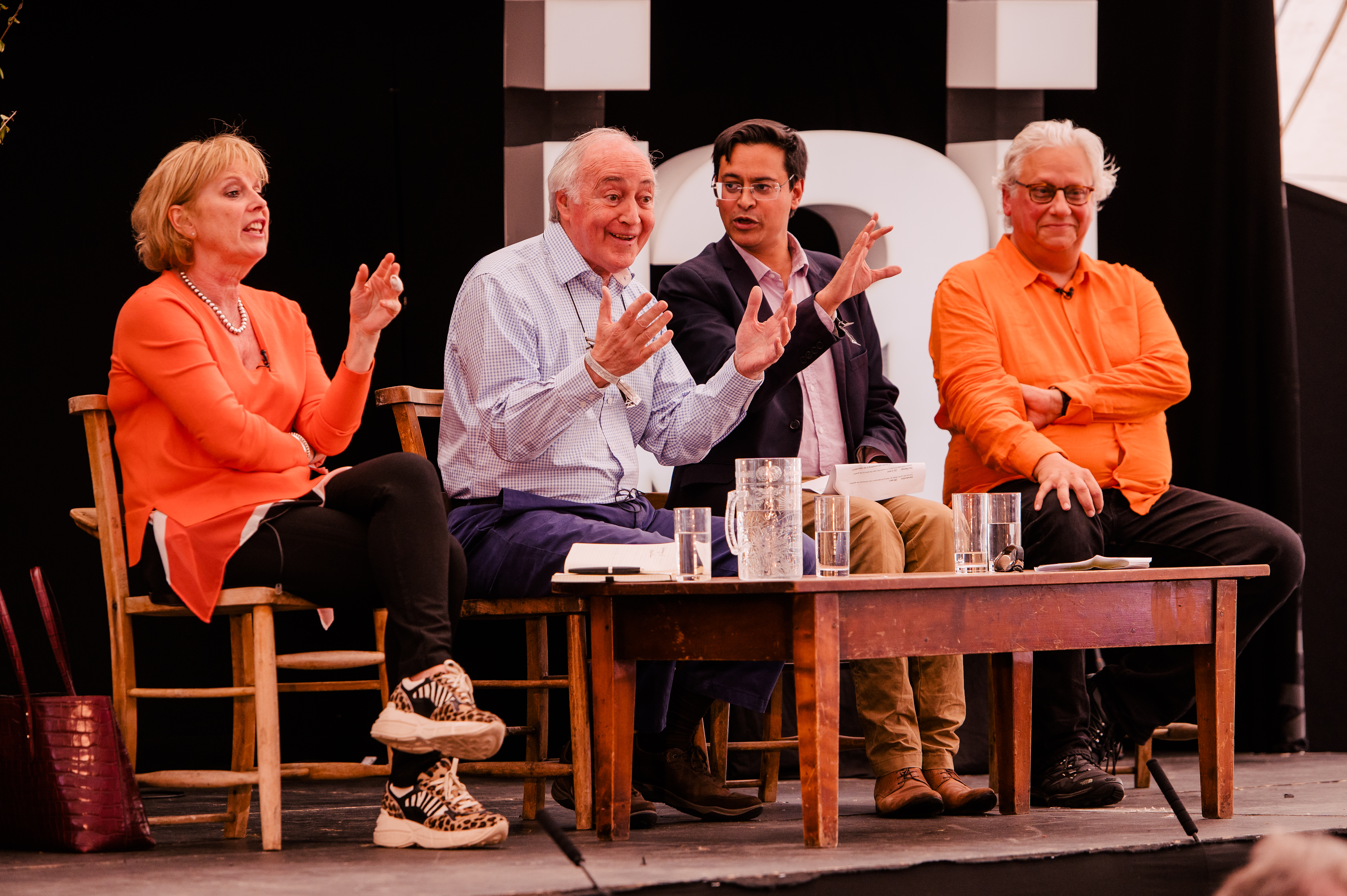
Anna Soubry, Michael Howard, Rana Mitter, and Jon Lansman at HowTheLightGetsIn Festival

The 2012 festival was held in Hay-on-Wye and ran between 31 May and 10 June 2012. The festival staged almost five hundred sessions across the site's five venues.

Amongst the speakers on the festival's programme were musician Brian Eno, founder of Glastonbury festival Michael Eavis, literary theorist and critic Terry Eagleton and independent scientist and inventor James Lovelock. Musical highlights included performances from Charlotte Church, Emmy the Great, and Jeffrey Lewis and the Junkyard, as well as a twelve-hour painting marathon from artist Stella Vine to accompany a performance by alternative rock band The Chapman Family.

London's Open Gallery, an institution dedicated to the medium of video painting, also staged a series works by filmmaker Roz Mortimer entitled, ‘Sites of Memory’.

== 2013 Hay, 'Error, Lies, & Adventure' ==
The 2013 festival took place from 23 May to 2 June 2013. It featured talks from Terry Pratchett, John Searle, Angie Hobbs, Nassim Nicholas Taleb, and Michael McIntyre among others. The music line-up included Sam Lee, King Charles, and Moulettes, while the comedy line-up featured acts from Tom Rosenthal and Phil Wang.

== 2014 Hay, 'Heresy, Truth and the Future' ==
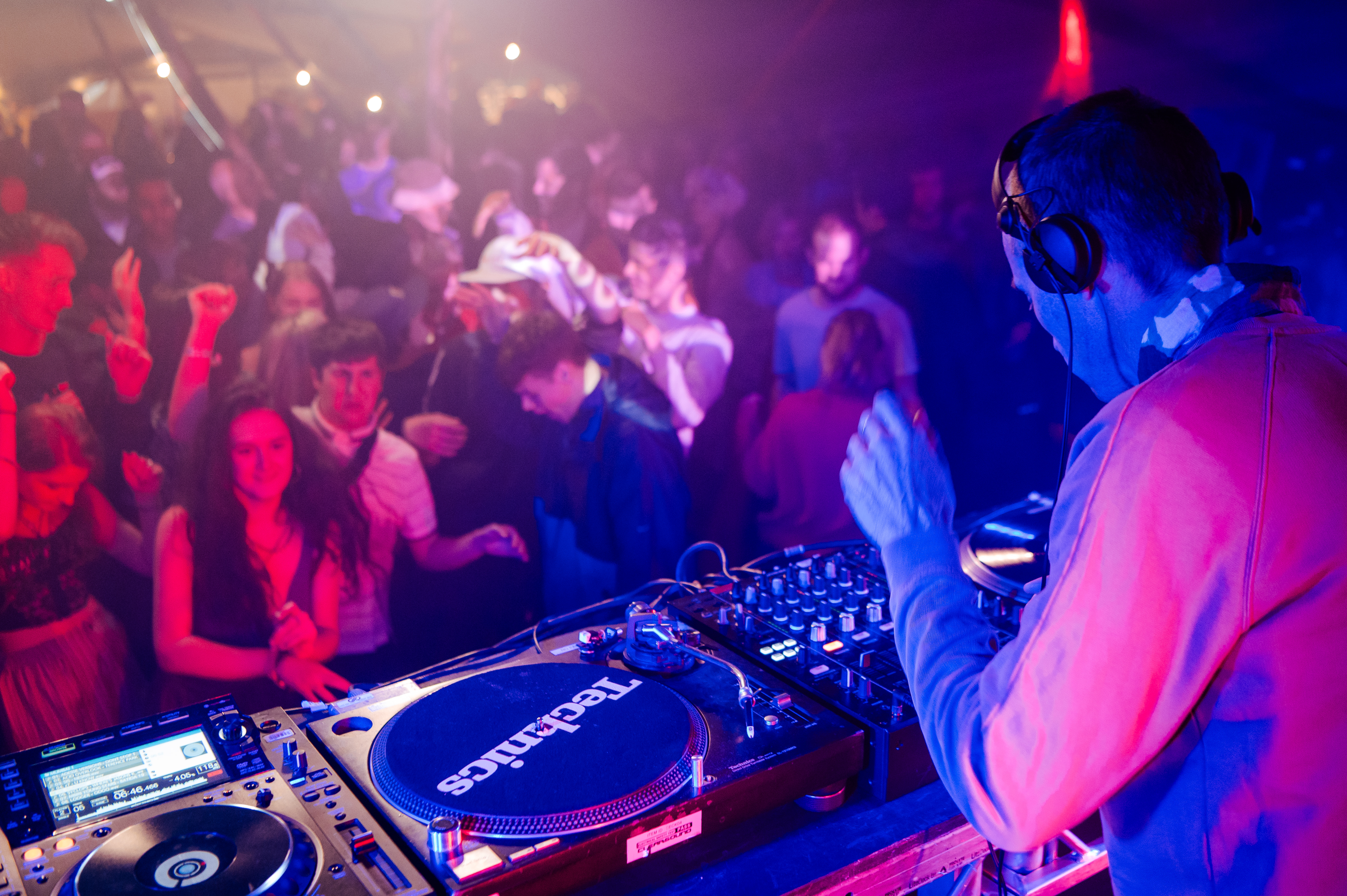
DJ and crowd at HowTheLIghtGetsIn Festival

HowTheLightGetsIn 2014 attracted a footfall of over 35,000 across 450 events. Speakers and performers included Roger Penrose, Brooke Magnanti, Bruce Parry, Doon Mackichan, Cory Doctorow, Owen Jones, David Nutt, Molotov Jukebox, Moulettes, Natalie Bennett and Mr Scruff.

== 2015 Hay, 'Fantasy and Reality' ==
The festival for 2015 took place from 21 to 31 May 2015 and included performances and talks from Simon Blackburn, Mike Skinner, George Galloway, Natalie Bennett, Lawrence Krauss, Michael Howard, Lianne La Havas, Yasmin Alibhai-Brown and Rae Morris among others. As part of the festival, the New College of the Humanities presented the IAI School. Aimed at 16- to 18-year-olds, the IAI School explored topics such as Free Will and Politics, Sex Ethics and Morality.

== 2016 Hay, 'The Known, the Strange, and the New' ==
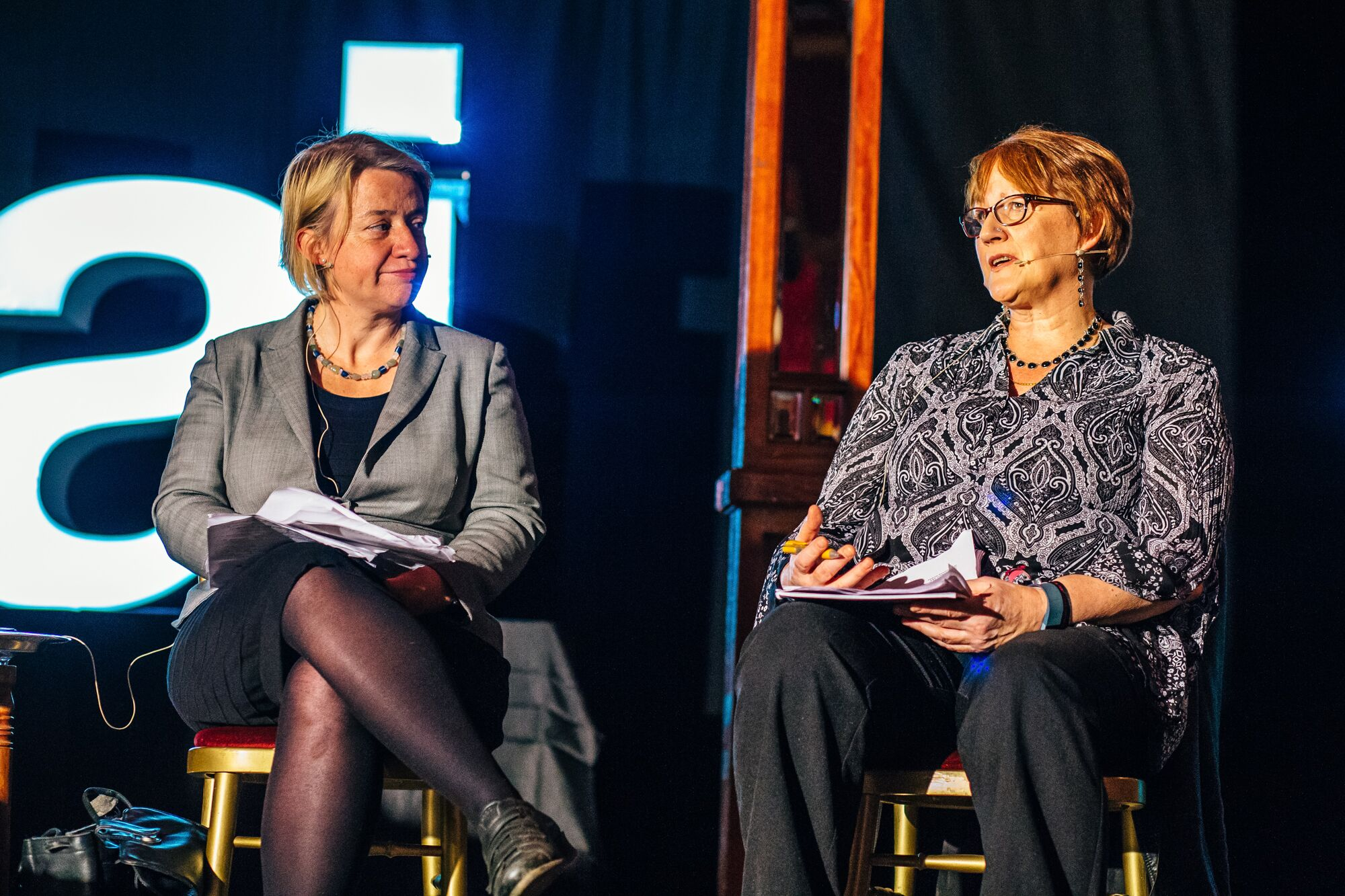
Natalie Bennett and Patricia Lewis at HowTheLightGetsIn 2016

The 2016 festival took place from 26 May to 5 June. Speakers were to include Natalie Bennett, Owen Jones, Ken Livingstone, Bernard Carr, Kwasi Kwarteng and Roger Scruton. The music lineup featured Ghostpoet, Fairport Convention, Gilles Peterson, C Duncan, Eska, and Tom Robinson.

== 2018 Hay, 'Darkness, Authority and Dreams' ==
After taking a fallow year in 2017, the 2018 May festival took place from 25 to 28 May 2018.

Speakers included political theorist Noam Chomsky, psychiatrist and former Government Drugs Adviser David Nutt, linguist John McWhorter, Shadow Home Secretary Diane Abbott, former Archbishop of Canterbury Rowan Williams, economist Deirdre McCloskey. The music line-up featured Scissor Sisters' Ana Matronic, Hot Chip, The Correspondents, Nerina Pallot and Laura Wright.

== 2018 London, 'Tribal Truths and New Wisdoms' ==
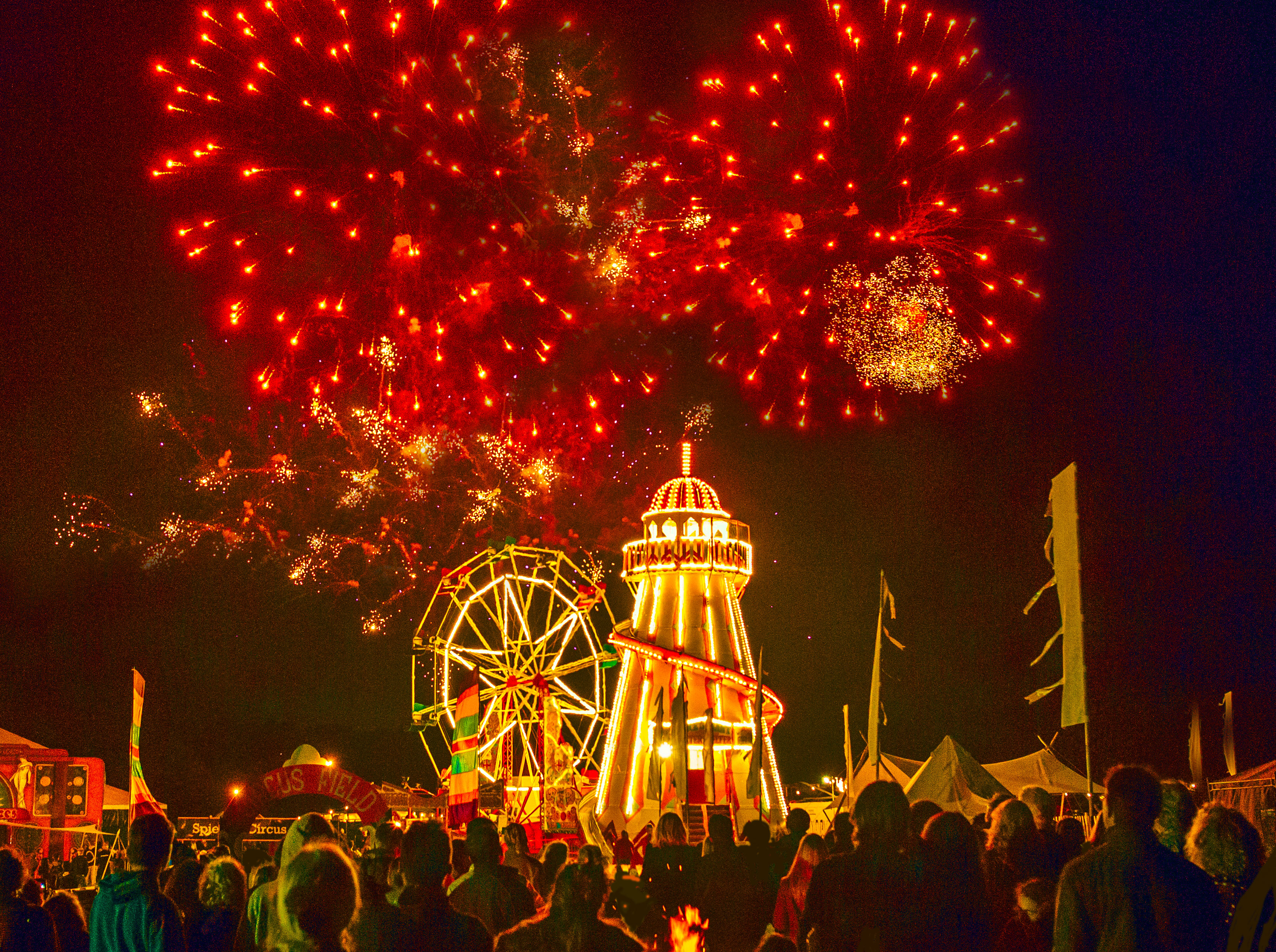
Fireworks at HowTheLIghtGetsIn Festival Hay 2018

From 22 to 23 September 2018, HowTheLightGetsIn hosted its first ever London festival on the grounds of Kenwood House in Hampstead Heath.

Speakers included neuroscientist Steven Pinker, philosopher and author Rebecca Goldstein, Banksy's former agent Steve Lazarides, novelist Deborah Levy, Turner Prize architect Paloma Strelitz, and long-time Hawking collaborator Roger Penrose. The music line-up included pop duo Bloom Twins and singer-songwriter Rae Morris, while Ahir Shah and Olga Koch headlined the comedy programme.

== 2019 Hay, 'Tribal Truths and New Wisdoms' ==
HowTheLightGetsIn returned to Hay for its tenth anniversary year from 24 to 27 May.

Speakers included philosopher of language Saul Kripke, Change UK MP Anna Soubry, cognitive psychologist Donald D. Hoffman, novelist Janne Teller, economist and writer Linda Yueh, and Momentum founder Jon Lansman. Donovan, Anna Calvi, and British Sea Power headlined the music programme, while the comedy line-up was led by Lou Sanders and Phil Wang.

== 2019 London, 'Uncharted Territory' ==
HowTheLightGetsIn returned to the grounds of Kenwood House on the weekend of 21–22 September 2019. Topics of discussion included fake news, the problematic sex appeal of the archetypal "bad boy", space exploration in the 21st century, gene editing, population control, and big data.

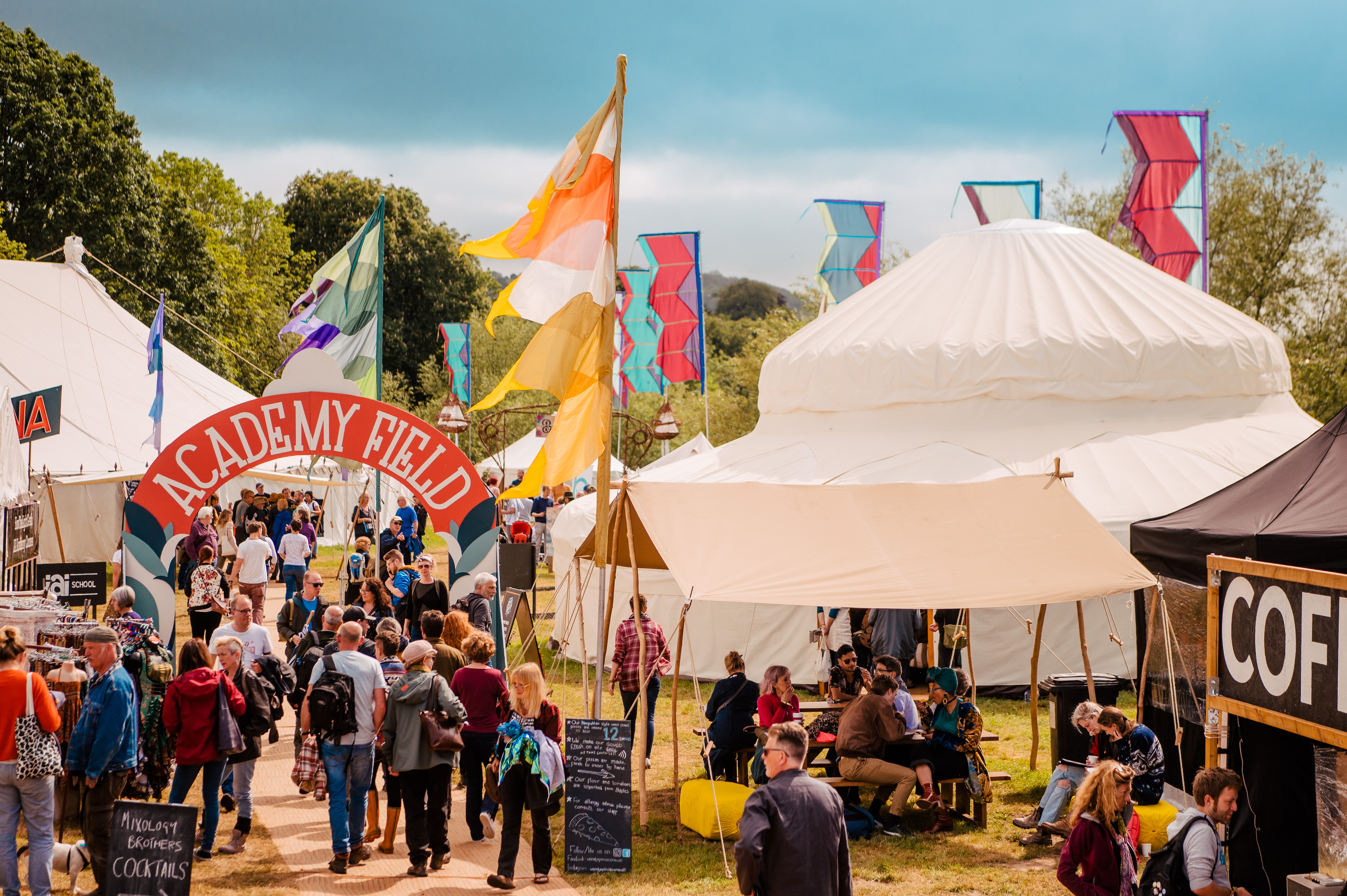
HowTheLightGetsIn Festival Hay-on-Wye 2019

Speakers included Slavoj Zizek, politicians Natalie Bennett and Rory Stewart, theorist of surveillance capitalism Shoshana Zuboff, clinical psychologist Simon Baron-Cohen, and economist and policy advisor Mariana Mazzucato. The music line-up included singer-songwriter Nerina Pallot, DJ Don Letts, and electroswing duo Sam and the Womp, while comedians included Tony Law, Olga Koch, and Sophie Duker.

== 2020 Online, 'Uncharted Territory' ==
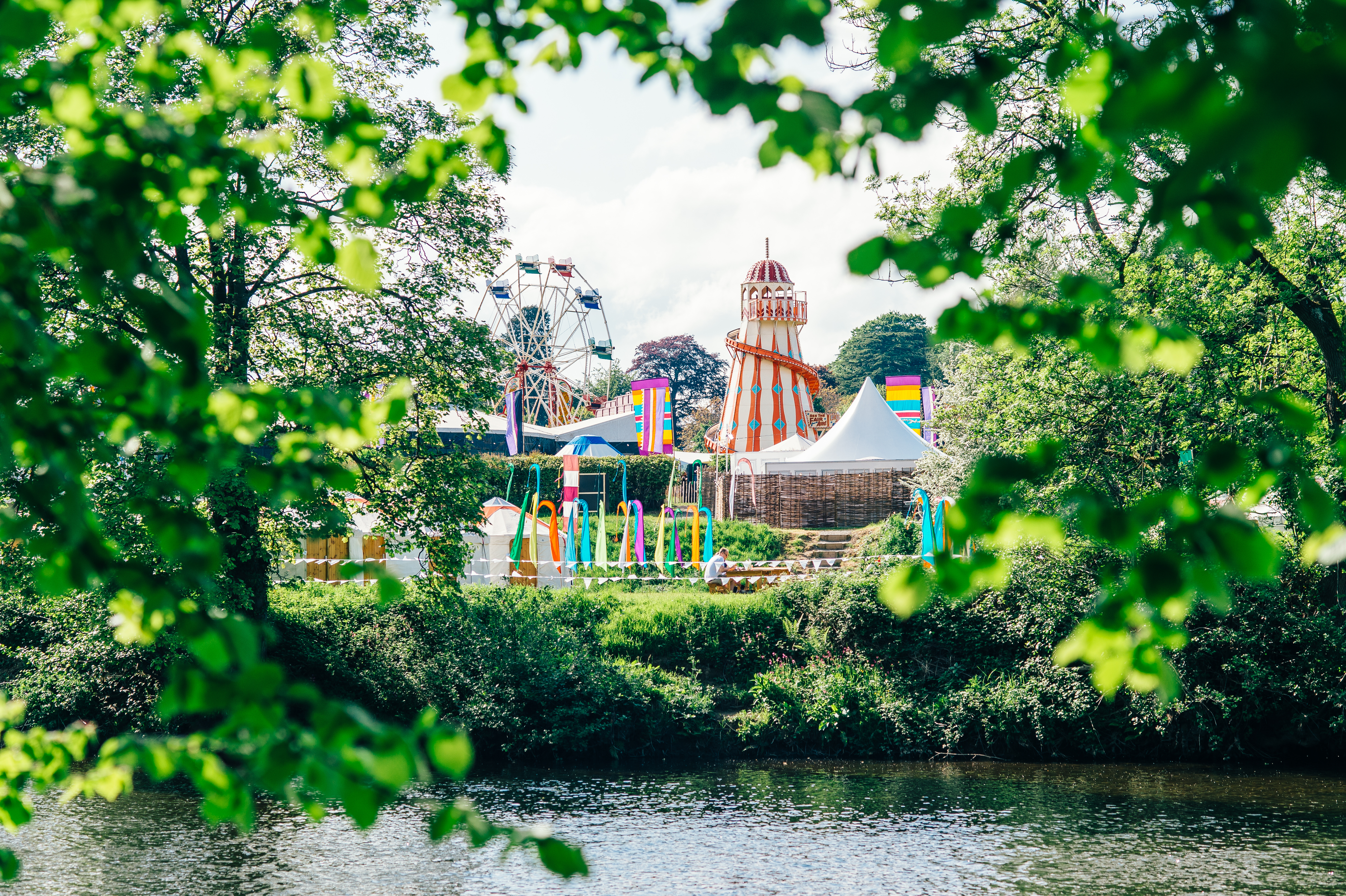
HowTheLightGetsIn Festival as seen from the banks of the River Wye

The 2020 May festival was HowTheLightGetsIn's first fully online festival. Speakers include Paul Krugman, Daniel Kahneman, Patricia Churchland, Steven Pinker, Jess Phillips, Will Self, Sally Phillips, Shami Chakrabarti, and many more. The Online Festival had over 200 events, on 7 stages, over 4 days. It contained multiple live events streamed at the same time, with audiences questions and real time comments. The festival also featured social spaces where festival-goers could meet each other as well as speakers and musicians.

== 2020 Global, 'Belief, Hypocrisy and Reason' ==
Over the weekend 19–20 September, the festival hosted its next event: HowTheLightGetsIn Global 2020: Delhi, London, New York. This online festival included 200 events live streamed from Delhi, London and New York, giving the festival global reach and making it accessible from all time zones.

The events streamed on seven stages, with a line up of speakers, bands and comedy acts. In addition there were social spaces to meet other festival goers, chat to speakers and artists and enjoy live-streamed music.

Speakers attending included Nobel Prize winning economist Joseph Stiglitz, director of the Tate Modern, Frances Morris, ecofeminist Vandana Shiva, cognitive scientist and philosopher Daniel Dennett, and theoretical physicist Claudia de Rham.

The theme for the festival was belief, hypocrisy and reason.

== Further conferences ==
- 2023
  - HowTheLightGetsIn Hay 2023 ran from 26 to 29 May 2023 in Hay on Wye.
