= Hilary Lawson =

British philosopher and filmmaker

Education
- Education: Balliol College, Oxford

Philosophical work
- Era: 21st-century philosophy
- Region: Western philosophy
- School: Continental philosophy
- Main interests: Metaphysics; Theory of truth; Philosophy of science; Postmodernity
- Notable works: Closure: A story of everything; Reflexivity: The post-modern predicament
- Website: www.hilarylawson.com

Hilary Lawson is an English philosopher and founder of the Institute of Art and Ideas.

Lawson's philosophical work explores problems of self-reference and non-realist metaphysics. In Reflexivity: The Post-Modern Predicament (1985), he argued that self-referential paradoxes are central to twentieth-century philosophy and postmodernism. His later book Closure: A Story of Everything (2001) develops a comprehensive non-realist metaphysics, proposing that humans "close" the openness of the world through thought and language, creating what we experience as reality. The book has been described by Don Cupitt as "perhaps the first largescale Anglo-Saxon non-realist 'metaphysics'". Lawson has also had a broadcasting and documentary film-making career and founded Television and Film Productions, now known as TVF Media.

== Biography ==
Lawson graduated from Balliol College, Oxford with a first in PPE, and as a post-graduate began a DPhil on the problems of self-reference. This later became his book Reflexivity: The Post-Modern Predicament (1985) as part of the series Problems of Modern European Thought in which he argued that self-referential paradoxes are central to twentieth century philosophy, and specifically post-modernism.

Later, Lawson pursued a broadcasting career. As a writer and director he made documentaries, created the series Where There's Life and co-authored a book based on the series. At 28, he was appointed editor of programmes at TV-am. In the late 1980s he founded the production company TVF Media which made documentary and current affairs programming, including Channel 4's international current affairs programme, The World This Week. Lawson was editor of the programme which ran weekly between 1987 and 1991.

His book Closure was published in 2001. The book has been described by Don Cupitt as "perhaps the first largescale Anglo-Saxon non-realist 'metaphysics'".

Lawson founded the Institute of Art and Ideas in 2008, an ideas and philosophy platform which hosts the world's largest philosophy festival, HowTheLightGetsIn.

== Philosophical work ==
Initially influenced by postmodernism at the outset of his career, Lawson contributed to and co-edited the collection of essays Dismantling Truth: Reality in the Post-Modern World, which explored the philosophical core of the theory. He also published the pamphlet After Truth - A Post Modern Manifesto, written in collaboration with Hugh Tomlinson, a translator of Deleuze. The influence of a postmodern approach continued in his collaborations with the American philosopher Richard Rorty, who contributed to Lawson's BBC film Science...Fiction? in which Lawson argued that "science is not powerful because it is true, but true because it is powerful" and in Lawson's subsequent film on Plato entitled The First World. Rorty also contributed to Lawson's collection Dismantling Truth.

These works demonstrate Lawson’s long-standing scepticism of realism, apparent in the last decade from his exchange of articles with Timothy Williamson and debates with analytic philosophers John Searle, Simon Blackburn, and others. Despite accepting the basic postmodernist claims about the unrealistic nature of an objective truth, Lawson emphasises the need for “post-realism”. He argues that postmodernism is made incoherent by self-reference and ‘associated project of describing the relationship between language and the world.’

Lawson’s theory of “closure” responds to his rejection of realism and postmodernism, by proposing that the world is open and complex, but that it is enclosed by defined limits such as language and meaning. As Patrick Dillon says, ‘Closure can be understood as the imposition of fixity on openness. The closing of that which is open. […] Through closure there are things’. The theory shifts the focus of metaphysics away from language and towards an exploration of the tension between openness and closure. Given Lawson’s earlier work on self-reference, an important element of the theory of “closure” is its own self-referential nature.

The framework of closure enables Lawson to claim that he provides an account of the relationship between language and the world that does not rely on reference and which he argues overcomes the problem of how language is hooked onto the world that beset twentieth century philosophy. One of the consequences of the theory is that philosophical oppositions, between language and the world, fact and value, are no longer regarded as oppositions. Lawson proposes that science is 'driven by the search for closure’, whilst art is described as 'the pursuit of openness and the avoidance of closure', arguing that the two are not in opposition to one another but rather in different relationships to openness and closure.

== Books ==
In Reflexivity, Lawson argued that self-reference was central to contemporary philosophy. Using Nietzsche, Heidegger and Derrida as the main examples, he sought to show that reflexivity was the primary motor of their work. It was implicit that similar arguments could be applied to Wittgenstein and the analytic tradition.

The introduction to Closure extends the arguments put forward in Reflexivity to the broader philosophical tradition. It argues that issues of self-reference undermine currently available philosophical positions. The main body of the book describes the process of closure and the means by which people can intervene in the world and seemingly understand it. In doing so it seeks to demonstrate that meaning and understanding are not dependent on notions of reference and truth, arguing that although there is nothing in common between closure and openness this does not limit the ability to intervene successfully in the world. Other books include Dismantling Truth: Science in Post-Modern Times. Articles include After Truth, On Integrity, and Philosophy As.

== Art ==
Lawson created his first video paintings in 2001, inspired by his philosophy of 'closure'. He went on to found the Open Gallery in 2005, which brought a collective of artists together to develop the medium.

His video painting work has been exhibited at: the Hayward Gallery (2006); sketch (restaurant) (2007), the ICA (2007), and The Globe at Hay gallery (2008). Now Revisited, performed at Shunt, London in 2009, was a video painting installation in five acts in which the audience found themselves the subject of the work.

== Documentary film and factual television ==
Lawson's documentary films include: Your Own Worst Enemy, writer and producer, (ITV); Science ... fiction?, written and directed (BBC); Broken Images, written and directed (BBC); The First World, written and directed (Channel 4); The Man, the Myth, and The Maker, produced and presented (Channel 4); Incredible Evidence (90mins), written and directed (Channel 4). His current affairs output includes: The World This Week (1hr, weekly 1988-93), Editor (Channel 4); Cooking the Books, written and directed (Channel 4); Patent on Life, written and directed (Channel 4); For Queen or Country, written and directed (Channel 4).

== Awards ==
- The Emily Award, American Film and Video Festival, ‘The First World’, 1991
- Educational Award, Royal Television Society, Nomination, ‘Write Away! Beginnings, Middles and Endings’, 2000
- Children’s | Schools Factual - Primary Award, British Academy Award, Nomination, ‘Just Write: Stand Up Poetry’, 2000-1
