= Concepción =

Concepción (Spanish for conception) refers to the Immaculate Conception of Mary, mother of Jesus, according to Roman Catholic Church doctrine. Concepción or Concepcion may also refer to:

== Geography ==
=== Argentina ===
- Concepción, Catamarca, a village
- Concepción, Corrientes, a town
- Concepción, Tucumán, a city
- Concepción de Buena Esperanza, dead city in Chaco province
- Concepción de la Sierra, Misiones Province, a village
- Concepción del Bermejo, Chaco, a village
- Concepción del Uruguay, Entre Ríos, a city
- Concepción Department, Argentina, Corrientes

=== Bolivia ===
- Concepción, Santa Cruz, a town
- Concepción Lake, Chiqui, a lake in Chiquitos Province
- Valle de la Concepción, an agricultural valley and wine region in Tarija Department

=== Chile ===
- Bay of Concepción
- Concepción, Chile
- Concepción Province, Chile
- Greater Concepción
- Roman Catholic Archdiocese of Concepción

=== Colombia ===
- Concepción, Antioquia
- Concepción, Santander

=== Costa Rica ===
- Concepción District, Alajuelita

=== Guatemala ===
- Concepción, Sololá
- Concepción Chiquirichapa
- Concepción Huista
- Concepción Las Minas
- Concepción Tutuapa

=== Honduras ===
- Concepción, Intibucá
- Concepción, Ocotepeque
- Concepción de María, Choluteca

=== Mexico ===
- Concepción Buenavista
- Concepción de Buenos Aires
- Concepción Pápalo

=== Nicaragua ===
- Concepción (volcano)

=== Paraguay ===
- Concepción, Paraguay
- Concepción Department, Paraguay
- Roman Catholic Diocese of Concepción en Paraguay

=== Peru ===
- Concepción, Junín
- Concepción District, Vilcas Huamán
- Concepción District, Concepción
- Concepción Province, Peru

=== Philippines ===
- Concepcion, Gandara, Samar
- Concepcion, Iloilo
- Concepcion, Misamis Occidental
- Concepcion, Romblon
- Concepcion, Tarlac

=== Spain ===
- Concepción (Madrid), a ward in Madrid

=== United States ===
- Concepcion, Texas
- Mission Concepcion, a Franciscan mission in Texas

== People ==
- Bernabe Concepcion (born 1988), Filipino boxer
- Camila María Concepción (1991–2020), American transgender rights activist and television writer
- César Concepción (1909–1974), Puerto Rican musician
- Concepción Aleixandre (1862–1952), Spanish physician
- Concepcion Anes (1929/1930–2004), Gibraltarian politician
- Concepción Arenal (1820–1893), Spanish feminist writer
- Concepción Argüello (1781–1857), fiancée of Nikolai Rezanov and later nun
- Concepción Badillo (born 1986), Spanish swimmer
- Concepción Bellorín (born 1980), Spanish judoka
- Concepción Blasco Oliver (1858–1938), Spanish philanthropist
- Concepción Bona (1824–1901), Dominican independence campaigner
- Concepción Cabrera de Armida (1862–1937), Mexican Catholic mystic and writer
- Concepción Cascajosa (born 1979), Spanish communication scholar
- Concepción Castañeda Ortiz (born 1952), Mexican politician
- Concepción Dueso Garcés (born 1967), Spanish goalball player
- Concepción Espejel (born 1959), Spanish magistrate
- Concepción Felix (1884–1967), Filipina feminist and human rights activist
- Concepción Gimeno de Flaquer (1850-1919), Spanish writer, editor, feminist, traveler
- Concepción González Molina (born 1953), Mexican politician
- Concepción Hernández Díaz (born 1972), Spanish goalball player
- Concepción Langa Nuño, Spanish historian
- Concepción Leyes de Chaves (1891–1985), Paraguayan writer
- Concepción Lombardo (1835–1931), wife of the Mexican president Miguel Miramon
- Concepción Mariño (1790–1854), participant in the Venezuelan War of Independence
- Concepción Mendizábal Mendoza (1893–1985), Mexican civil engineer
- Concepción Montaner (born 1981), Spanish long jumper
- Concepción Ojeda Hernández (born 1977), Mexican politician
- Concepción Palacios Herrera (1893–1981), Nicaraguan physician
- Concepción Paredes (1970–2019), Spanish triple jump athlete
- Concepción Picciotto (1936–2016), peace activist and nuclear-disarmament advocate
- Concepción Quiñones de Longo, Puerto Rican pediatrician and government official
- Concepción Ramírez (1942–2021), Guatemalan peace activist
- Concepcion Rodriguez (born 1986), Panamanian baseball player
- Concepción Robles Altamirano (born 1965), Mexican politician
- Concepción Saiz Otero (1851–1934), Spanish educator and feminist
- Concepción Silva Belinzon (1903–1987), Uruguayan writer
- Concepción Úsuga (born 2001), Colombian weightlifter
- Danilo Concepcion (born 1958), Filipino lawyer and academic administrator
- Dave Concepción (born 1948), former Major League baseball player during the 1970s and 1980s
- Emerito Concepción (born 1962), Filipino sport shooter
- Félix Alberto Beltrán Concepción (1938–2022), Cuban artist
- Francisca Josefa de la Concepción (1671–1742), Colombian nun and mystic
- Gaby Concepcion, Filipina actress and lawyer
- Gabby Concepcion (born 1964), Filipino actor
- Gabriela Concepción (born 1989), Venezuelan beauty pageant contestant
- Gerardo Concepción (born 1992), Cuban baseball player
- Gerónimo de la Concepción (1642–1698), Spanish Carmelite and writer
- Iluminada Concepción (born 1956), Cuban tennis player
- Imelda Concepcion (born 1936), Filipina actress
- Hermogenes Concepcion Jr. (1920–2018), Associate Justice of the Supreme Court of the Philippines
- Janier Concepción (born 1985), Cuban rower
- Juan Gabriel Concepción (born 1972), Spanish pole vaulter
- Julio Concepcion, American politician
- KC Concepcion (American football) (born 2004), American football player
- KC Concepcion (actress) (born 1985), Filipina entertainer
- Kevin Concepcion (born 2004), American football player
- Lee Concepcion (born 1967), Filipino swimmer
- Luis Concepción (born 1985), Panamanian boxer
- Mercedes Concepcion (born 1928), Filipina social scientist
- Monchile Concepción (1905–1967), Puerto Rican baseball player
- Nicholas de Concepcion (fl. 1720), pirate
- Onix Concepción (born 1957), Puerto Rican baseball player
- Pedro Concepcion, Filipino lawyer and election official
- Rafael Concepción (born 1982), Panamanian boxer
- René Concepcion (born 1969), Filipino swimmer
- Roberto Concepcion (1903–1987), Chief Justice of the Supreme Court of the Philippines
- Rudy Concepción (1912–1940), Filipino film actor
- Sabino Bautista Concepción (born 1963), Mexican politician
- Sam Concepcion (born 1992), Filipino entertainer
- Tomas Fernandez Concepcion (1933–2012), Filipino politician and sculptor
- Valerie Concepcion (born 1987), Filipina entertainer
- Venancio Concepción, Filipino general
- Vincent and Liza Concepcion, respondents in the United States Supreme Court case AT&T Mobility v. Concepcion
- Yam Concepcion (born 1988), Filipina actress
- Conchita, a popular diminutive form of this name

== Ships ==
- Concepción (carrack), a 16th-century Spanish ship that participated in Magellan's circumnavigation
- CSS Robert E. Lee, an American Civil War-era ship, later the Chilean Navy ship Concepción
- La Concepcion, a ship that sunk near the Dominican Republic in 1641
- Spanish ship Concepción, various Spanish Navy ships

== Historical events ==
- Battle of Concepción, in the Texas War of Independence
- Battle of La Concepción, between Chile and Peru
- Battle of Concepción, Chile (disambiguation)

== See also ==
- Basilica of the Immaculate Conception (disambiguation)
- Bishop of Concepción (disambiguation)
- Cathedral of the Immaculate Conception (disambiguation)
- Cathedral of Saint Mary of the Immaculate Conception (disambiguation)
- Church of the Immaculate Conception (disambiguation)
- Concepción Department (disambiguation)
- Concepción District (disambiguation)
- Concepción Province (disambiguation)
- Conception (disambiguation)
- Inmaculada Concepción (disambiguation)
- La Concepción (disambiguation)
- La Purísima Concepción (disambiguation)
