= Ignacio Carrera Pinto =

Chilean military hero (1848–1882)

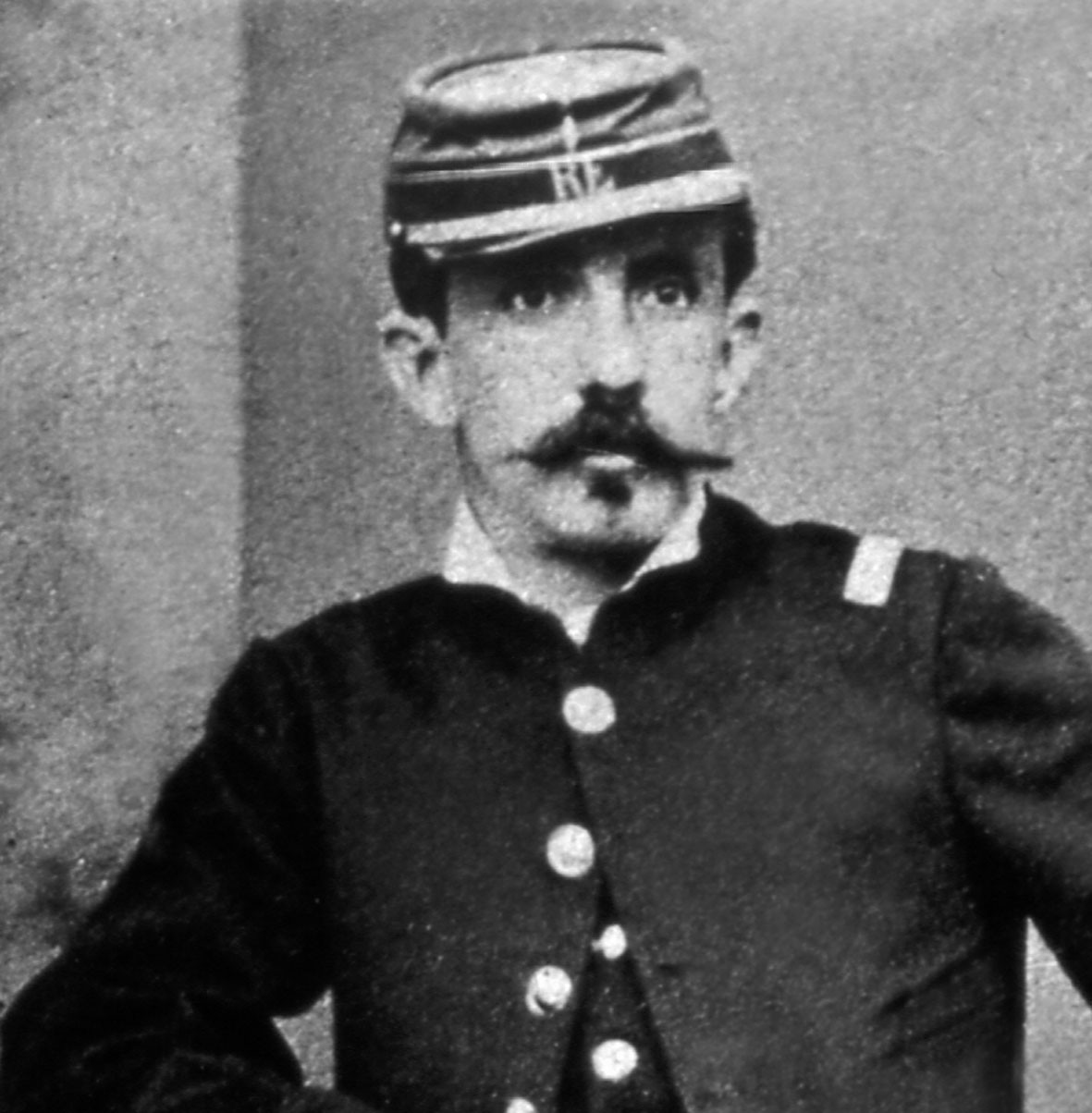
- Born: Ignacio José Carrera Pinto; 5 February 1848; Santiago, Chile
- Died: 10 July 1882 (aged 34); Concepción, Peru
- Parents: José Miguel Carrera Fontecilla (father); Emilia Pinto Benavente (mother)
- Relatives: Ignacio de la Carrera y Cuevas (paternal great-grandfather); Francisco Antonio Pinto (maternal great-grandfather); José Miguel Carrera Verdugo (paternal grandfather); Aníbal Pinto Garmendia (maternal great-uncle); Javiera Carrera (aunt); Juan José Pedro Carrera (uncle); Luis Carrera (uncle)
- Family: Carrera family Pinto family
- Military career
- Conflict: War of the Pacific; Tacna and Arica campaign; Battle of Tarapacá; Breña campaign; Battle of La Concepción †

Ignacio Carrera Pinto (1848–1882) was a Chilean soldier and Captain of the 4th Company of the "Chacabuco" 6th Line Battalion who was killed in action at the Battle of La Concepción. A hero of the War of the Pacific, Carrera is commemorated on the thousand peso banknote.

== Biography ==
Carrera was born in Santiago, Chile; the son of José Miguel Carrera Fontecilla, of Basque descent, and of Emilia Pinto Benavente. He was the grandson of Jose Miguel Carrera Verdugo, one of Chile's independence heroes. He was also the great-grandson and great-nephew of Chile's Presidents Francisco Antonio Pinto and Aníbal Pinto. When the War of the Pacific, between Chile, on one side, and Peru and Bolivia on the other, started in 1879, Carrera Pinto enlisted in the Chilean Army's 7th Mobilized Infantry Regiment – the "Esmeralda" regiment. Over the next few years, Carrera's accomplishments and personal merits resulted in a series of rapid promotions, becoming a lieutenant in 1881 and a captain in 1882. He participated in the Lima Campaign and in the Sierra Campaign.

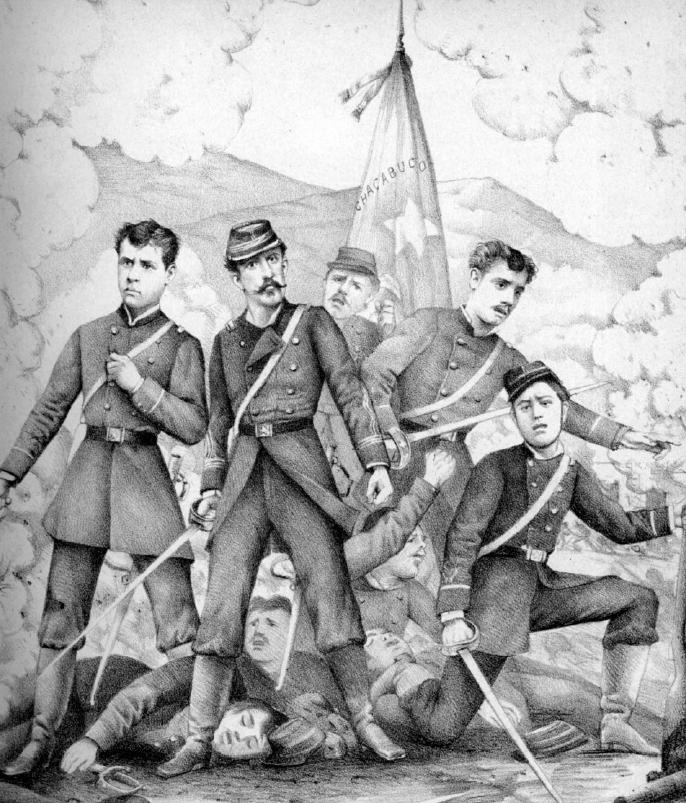
Ignacio Carrera Pinto and the Héroes de la Concepción

In July 1882, during the Sierra Campaign, Captain Carrera was in command of the Esmeralda's Fourth Company of Chacabuco, which was guarding the Peruvian town of La Concepción. Including officers, Fourth Company totaled 77 soldiers, divided into three platoons under lieutenants Julio Montt Salamanca, Luis Cruz Martínez and Arturo Perez Canto. On July 10, 1882, in the Battle of La Concepción, the town was attacked by 400 regular Peruvian soldiers and large groups of natives, which were part of the forces of Andrés Cáceres, a Peruvian officer who was conducting a guerrilla war. Despite being greatly outnumbered and out of ammunition, the Chilean soldiers did not surrender. The last Chilean soldiers died charging the well-armed Peruvian army with only their bayonets.

The Carrera family was one of Chile's most influential families and grew considerably in number. The bulk of the family remains in Santiago and the southern Bio Bio Province, although a portion emigrated to Sweden.

The Chilean one thousand peso banknote bears Ignacio Carrera's face.
