= Luis Cruz Martínez =

Chilean military hero (1866–1882)

Luis Cruz Martinez
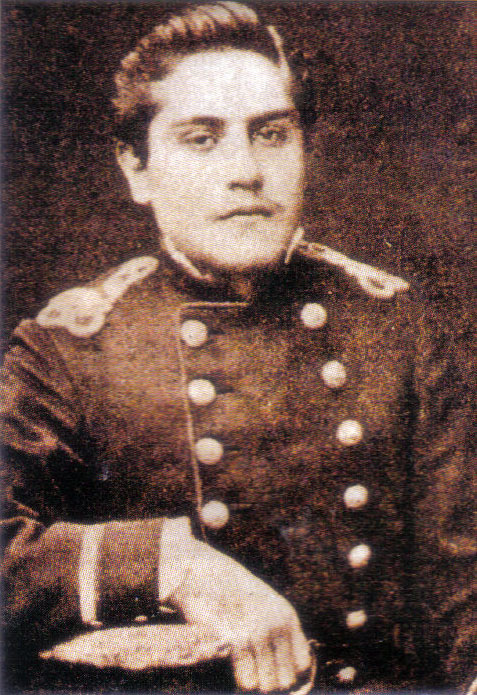
- Born: August 5, 1866; Molina, Chile
- Died: July 10, 1882 (aged 15)
- Occupation: Army Lieutenant
- Known for: hero of the Battle of La Concepción

Luis Cruz Martinez (Villa de Molina, Chile, 5 August 1866 – Concepción, Perú, 10 July 1882) was a lieutenant of the 6th. second company of Regiment "Chacabuco" and hero of the Battle of La Concepción, during the War of the Pacific in 1882, in Chilean occupied territory.

== Biography ==
Luis Cruz Martinez was the natural son of the widow Martina Martinez Franco and Severo de la Cruz Vergara, a rich landowner. He was baptized in the Parish Church of Curicó on 7 August 1866 by Father Celedonio Galvez, with the sister of his father being the godmother.

As a classmate of his recounts: When war broke out, during the fourth year of studying humanities at the secondary school at Curicó, Luis Cruz Martinez was the top student in his class. Vast memory, clear intelligence, yet too tender, and exemplary conduct, were the facilities that predicted the student a solid future.

He joined the Curicó regiment, ascending in 1880 to the rank Sergeant 2°, and participated in the Battle of San Juan and Chorrillos and the Battle of Miraflores.

At the beginning of the war Cruz was so young he could barely raise his rifle to shoulder height, and was so short and weak, his comrades jokingly gave the nickname of "el cabo Tachuela."

In January 1882 he was posted to 4th company under the command of Ignacio Carrera Pinto. The unit was in charge of the garrison of the town of Concepción.

During the campaign of the Breña, Juan Gastó (the Colonel of the Army of Peru) made an attack on the village of Concepción. On defense Carrera-Pinto had just 77 men of the 4th company Chacabuco regiment, with little ammunition, one hundred rounds per man, and also three women who followed their husbands, one of whom was pregnant.

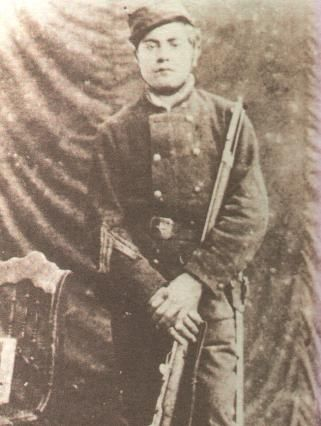
Luis Cruz Martínez

On Sunday July 9 Gasto's frontline, which had about 300 regular soldiers and an unknown number of Indians, descended on the town of Concepción. Carrera-Pinto closed the entrances to the plaza and fought in it, but after nightfall had to retreat to the barracks.

The battle continued throughout the night, and lasted twenty hours until the next day.

Although they were losing battle Carrera-Pinto would not surrender, following the example of Arturo Prat Chacón. According to General Andrés Avelino Cáceres in his memoirs : ... (the Chilean enemy) continued defending with unprecedented ferocity ...

Captain Ignacio Carrera-Pinto died fighting at dawn on Monday, 10 July. Lieutenant Luis Cruz Martinez then ascended to occupy Carrera's post as commander.

The Peruvians were able to set fire to the thatched roof of the barracks and managed to open their walls, through which they entered. Estanislao del Canto Arteaga, according to the testimony of two witnesses, describes the end of the battle:

At about nine o'clock of 10 July, there only remained Lieutenant Cruz and four soldiers defending the entrance to the grounds of the burned barracks. It was noted at that time that they had already exhausted all their ammunition because there were no shots, and then some Peruvian voices shouted: "Lieutenant Cruz, surrender my child, not to die!" To which Cruz replied, "Chileans never surrender!" and turning to his men asked: "Is not that right guys?" The soldiers responded affirmatively and then the Cruz ordered to fix bayonets and they charged furiously at the Indian masses. Fatigued, they had to surrender their lives, leaving some lances stuck in the Indians. Lieutenant Cruz suffered a shot in the back. When they could not convince Lieutenant Cruz surrender, they sent a young girl to the headquarters, whom the Cruz always greeted with affection, to go and beg him to surrender but the officer indignantly refused. The last two soldiers who escaped after the death of Cruz took refuge in the courtyard of a church and there he noticed that they spoke. Then they clasped their uniforms, shook hands, saluted the flag, secured their chinstraps and they rushed the oncoming enemy to die rifle in hand.
- Description by Colonel Estanislao del Canto Arteaga|#GGC11C

Lieutenant Cruz was found in the Plaza de Concepción naked, his hands shredded, due to sustained knife combat.

The school in which Cruz studied in Curicó is named Liceo Luis Cruz Martinez in honor of him. The school dates from 1838 and is the most important and prestigious high school in that city.

== See also ==
- War of the Pacific
- 6° Regiment of "Chacabuco"
