= La Concepción =

La Concepción may refer to:

- La Concepción, Veracruz, Mexico
- La Concepción, Masaya, Nicaragua
- La Concepción, Chiriquí, Panama
- La Concepción, Zulia, Venezuela

== See also ==
- Concepción (disambiguation)
- La Purísima Concepción (disambiguation)
