= Concepción Department =

Concepción Department may refer to:

- Concepción Department (Paraguay)
- Concepción Department, Corrientes

== See also ==
- Concepción (disambiguation)
