= La Purísima =

Places in Mexico called La Purísima:

- La Purísima, Durango (Tepehuanes Municipality)
- La Purísima, Guanajuato (Tarandacuao Municipality)
- La Purísima, Jalisco

== See also ==
- La Purísima Concepción (disambiguation)
- Purísima
