= Gasto =

Gasto may refer to:

- "Gasto", a song by Bad Gyal from Warm Up
- Juan Gastó, Peruvian colonel

== See also ==
- Gastro
- Gastos
