= Romeo Intengan =

Filipino doctor & priest (1942–2017)

Very Reverend Romeo J. Intengan S.J.
- Born: October 18, 1942; Cauayan, Negros Occidental, Philippines
- Died: October 10, 2017 (74 years old)
- Resting place: Sacred Heart Novitiate, Quezon City, Philippines
- Education: University of the Philippines, College of Medicine and Licentiate in Sacred Theology (S.T.L.), summa cum laude, Universidad Pontificia Comillas, Madrid, Spain
- Known for: Human Rights, Social Activism and Patriotism
- Title: Provincial Superior, Society of Jesus, Philippines
- Term: 1998 to 2004
- Political party: Partido Demokratiko Sosyalista ng Pilipinas
- Awards: Chino Roces Freedom Award

Romeo Jocson Intengan, S.J. (18 October 1942 – 10 October 2017) was a Filipino doctor, social activist, and Jesuit priest. He was called "Archie" or "Nonoy".

Intengan was outspoken in his advocacy for human rights and expressed his discontent with the Marcos regime's martial laws (September 1972) in the Philippines. Intengan was incarcerated and made his way to Europe to live in exile during the Marcos regime. While exiled, Intengan continued to work to restore democracy to the Philippines by collaborating with like-minded persons and organizations and calling for transparency and the end of abuse by state forces in the Philippines.

With the downfall of the Marcos regime in 1986 after the first People Power revolution, he led the efforts to help restore democracy through the Philippine Democratic Socialist Party (Tagalog: Partido Demokratiko Sosyalista ng Pilipinas) (PDSP).

In 2000, Intengan took a stand against former President Joseph E. Estrada. He signed the impeachment complaint against the former president, and after a series of peaceful demonstrations culminating with the second People Power revolution, the former president was removed from office.

== Early life and education ==
Romeo Joscon Intengan was born on 18 October 1942 in Cauayan, Negros Occidental. and was christened Romeo Antonio Jocson Intengan Jr. He was the eldest child of Colonel Romeo Artiaga Intengan Sr., a former commissioned officer of the Armed Forces of the Philippines and Augustina Torres Jocson de Intengan, a native of Iloilo, Philippines. Romeo has five siblings: Roberto, Alicia Agnes, Glicerio, Trinidad and Alexa.

Intengan received his education at Colegio de San Agustin in Iloilo City, St. John's Academy in San Juan, Metro Manila and Lincoln College in Iloilo City. He graduated as a valedictorian in 1953 and continued high school education at Lincoln College, eventually finishing as salutatorian in 1957. After high school, Intengan enrolled and completed the Pre-Medicine and Association of Arts courses at the University of the Philippines-Visayas, in Miagao, Iloilo.

In 1960, Intengan moved to Manila and enrolled in the Medicine program at the University of the Philippines-Manila, Padre Faura St., Manila, and finished his studies in 1965. He was an instructor in the College of Medicine of his alma mater and took his residency at the Department of Surgery at U.P.-Philippine General Hospital, Manila in 1970.

== At the University of the Philippines ==
As a medical student at the University of the Philippines (UP), Mr. Intengan joined the "UP Student Catholic Action" group (UPSCA). He was active in the Public Health Committee of the organization, which operated free clinics for preventative and therapeutic health care for urban poor areas of Metro Manila, Tramo (Pasay City), and Cristóbal (Paco, Manila).

=== Social awareness ===
In 1969, near the end of his training as a surgical resident, Dr. Intengan became aware of the emerging social crisis caused by the failure of the Marcos administration in addressing issues related to national economic development, unemployment, poverty, and corruption. He saw these problems first-hand due to his active involvement in providing healthcare to the urban poor settlements around Metro Manila. He began to participate in discussions to address the situation and eventually joined became an activist.

The bulk of the movement was Marxist–Leninist-led, which went against his Catholic Christian convictions. He helped found an alternative activist alliance that eventually took up social democracy as its societal model.

Fr. Intengan headed the Kilusan ng mga Anak ng Kalayaan which in 1970 merged with Hasik Kalayaan which was headed by Norberto Gonzales. On July 7, 1972, the Katipunan ng mga Demokratiko-Sosyalistang Pilipino (KDSP) was founded. The KDSP became the Partido Demokratiko-Sosyalista ng Pilipinas (Philippine Democratic Socialist Party, PDSP) on May 1, 1973.

== Socio-political involvement ==
Intengan headed the Education Commission in the Philippine Democratic Socialist Party (PDSP). His role in the PDSP was to ensure that its worldview and ideology was compatible with the Christian faith and the other monotheistic religions.

=== Joining the Society of Jesus ===
Intengan decided to join the Society of Jesus and entered the Sacred Heart Novitiate on 25 July 1970 alongside his novice-brother Roberto Villamero. He made his first vows as a Jesuit on 31 July 1972.

As a Jesuit novice and later as a scholastic, he remained active in the struggle for human rights, democracy, social justice, and good governance. He assisted in the campaign for a nonpartisan and reformist Constitutional Convention. After the Constitutional Convention was drafted in 1971, he joined citizens’ efforts to prevent it from being co-opted by the Marcos regime.

== Martial law and exile ==
After the declaration of martial law in September 1972, Intengan saw that President Marcos was not fulfilling the reformist agenda which he claimed as the justification of martial law. Intengan stood with the other leaders of the PDSP and led the party to oppose the Marcos dictatorship in May 1973. The PDSP worked underground to expand and consolidate its ranks. Its cadres organized workers, farmers, the urban poor and youth and students. Party branches in Metro Manila, Southern Tagalog, Iloilo, Cagayan de Oro and Davao was established. They eventually formed a network of allies among the various groups and persons opposing the Marcos regime.

=== Gathering of the opposition ===
In 1976, the late Jesuit priests Horacio de la Costa and Antonio Olaguer, introduced the PDSP to some of the leaders of the democratic opposition to the Marcos regime, such as Sen. Benigno S. Aquino Jr., Sen. Jovito R. Salonga, Sen. Francisco A. Rodrigo, and Mr. Luis José, and through the latter, to Sen. Raul S. Manglapus.

Meanwhile, Intengan was teaching theology as an instructor at the Theology Department of the College of Arts and Sciences of the Ateneo de Manila University. In December 1976 he was ordained to the diaconate, and three months after, on 27 March 1977, to the priesthood.

In 1977, the PDSP with its allies in the democratic opposition founded the Katipunan ng Bayan para sa Kalayaan or KABAKA where the social democratic program of government, Alternatibo ng Sambayanan, was adopted.

In 1978 the Marcos dictatorship decided to try to appear legitimate by holding elections for an interim Batasang Pambansa on 7 April 1978. The Marcos regime imposed conditions that hampered any real campaign of the opposition. The various elements of the opposition, including the PDSP and some well-known opposition figures, gathered and organized the Lakas ng Bayan (Laban) as the political party that would be their collective vehicle to attain the goals they had set in participating in those elections.

By 1978, the PDSP was entrusted with a major part of the planning and execution of Laban's campaign and poll watching efforts of. Among the activities planned and executed was the Metro Manila-wide noise barrage on the eve of the elections on 6 April.

On 7 April, the election was discovered to be rigged; the Marcos regime expelled opposition poll watchers from the precincts, arrested them, and arranged vote tabulation to be in favor of the regime.

On 9 April, the PDSP consisted of the majority of the participants in a march protesting the electoral fraud and violence committed by the regime. When the marchers refused to disperse on orders of police officers who blocked them on España Street inside Manila, they arrested the over 600-person group. Among those arrested were nine leaders of the opposition, including Intengan.

=== Incarceration ===
As an immediate consequence of the protest march, the Marcos dictatorship detained Intengan for two months—early April to early June 1978—at Camp Bagong Diwa, Bicutan, Taguig. Among his fellow detainees for various lengths of time were former Vice-president Teofisto T. Guingona, Senators Lorenzo M. Tañada, Francisco A. Rodrigo, Aquilino Q. Pimentel, and Joker P. Arroyo, and Attorney Ernesto Rondon.

In June 1978, Intengan was released to the custody of José A. Cruz, S.J., then President of the Ateneo de Manila University, on the promise that he refrained from political activity, and be confined to Metro Manila. Within two months of his release, he was constrained in resuming work with the PDSP and other forces in the democratic opposition. He disregarded the promise he made under duress as the PDSP was in disarray from the Marcos regime's manhunt and detention of its members. Some of its members either went missing or perished under various circumstances.

The Marxist–Leninist activist group took advantage of these events and took the lead in organizing and expanded exponentially. This alarmed Intengan as the basic ideology of the extreme left is incompatible with his faith and Catholic Christian foundation.

Meanwhile, the Marcos dictatorship kept Intengan under surveillance and discovered that he had resumed work with the democratic opposition. Signs of intensified surveillance, such as the monitoring of his theology class notes and the enrollment of a government agent in one of his theology classes, began to accumulate, with explicit threats of renewed detention.

In September 1980, Mrs. Imelda R. Marcos summoned Cruz and Intengan to the Presidential Guest House on Arlegui Street, and demanded that the Ateneo de Manila University turn over effective control of its "Office for Social Concern and Involvement" (OSCI) and similar social outreach agencies to the "Ministry of Human Settlements", of which Mrs. Marcos was the Minister. She stated that her aim was to give the students a correct understanding of Philippine reality. She illustrated her point by using Iran as an example, in which the militantly powerful regime of the Shah of Iran was overthrown by a popular revolution led by Islamic teachers, with Ayatullah Ruhullah Khomeini at the forefront.

Cruz refused her demands and stated that "The independence of the social outreach programs of the Ateneo de Manila University is needed for their credibility and efficacy". Intengan pointed out that the social ills to which some Jesuits and their friends were responding were real and not imagined.

=== Alliance with the Sultan of Sulu and the Moro National Liberation Front (MNLF) ===
By this time, Intengan and the PDSP leadership allied with the Moro National Liberation Front (MNLF). This alliance between the MNLF and the PDSP had the following goals:

- address the abuse by the Marcos dictatorship
- restoration of democracy
- redress of the grievances of the Bangsa Moro
- the fulfillment of their common legitimate aspirations

On 10 October 1978, Intengan left Manila for Zamboanga and then for Jolo. He was accompanied by members of the Kiram family, one of whom held the title of Sultan of Sulu, and by MNLF sympathizers.

In December 1978, accompanied by two PDSP cadres including the Chairman Norberto B. Gonzales, and escorted by two MNLF intelligence operatives, Intengan crossed over to the island of Sabah.

=== In Sabah ===
Intengan stayed in Sabah for more than a year. From December 1980 to early February 1982 he served as physician-in-residence at the MNLF camp, chaplain and political officer to the PDSP cadres who crossed over to Sabah.

In November 1981, military operatives of the Marcos regime captured the PDSP's Secretary General, Marianito "Mar" Canonigo just as he had crossed over from Sabah into Tawi-Tawi. He was carrying PDSP's Batayang Kurso (Party Basic Course) which Intengan developed for the PDSP. This forced the Malaysian government to no longer ignore the protests that they were harboring Filipino rebels from the Marcos regime. In February 1982 the Malaysian Home Ministry and Special Branch took Intengan and the other PDSP members into custody and interrogated them at the Special Branch headquarters at Kampong Kepayan, Kota Kinabalu.

=== Preparations for exile ===
In June 1982, the Malaysian government was convinced that the PDSP were neither Marxist nor advocating extremist, violent action and released them. Chairman Gonzales and Intengan were provided with Philippine passports (nom de guerre) by their underground connections and made their way to Hong Kong.

=== Across Asia to Europe ===
Intengan travelled to the General Curia in Rome, then to Madrid, Spain in August 1982. Gonzales proceeded to Frankfurt in West Germany and joined Intengan in Madrid by September 1982. Their other PDSP companions Teddy Lopez, Marcial Cacdac and Gregorio "Ka Tiks" Nazarrea also made their own way to Madrid.

Madrid became the center of PDSP's overseas planning and operations, which was facilitated by the Partido Socialista Obrero Español (PSOE), a fraternal party in the Socialist International, that rose to state power in Spain late in 1982.

During his time in Madrid from August 1982 to March 1987, he finished the Licentiate in Sacred Theology (S.T.L.) (summa cum laude) at the Universidad Pontificia Comillas in March 1987, with a specialization in Moral Theology (also known as Christian Ethics), while helping to organize the overseas democratic opposition to the Marcos regime. Norberto B. Gonzales of the PDSP; Tomas F. Concepción and Fathers Robert Reyes and Edwin Mercado (based in Italy); Alberto and Carmen N. Pedrosa (based in the United Kingdom); and Raul S. Manglapus, Heherson and Cecile Alvarez, and Raúl A. Daza (in the United States), and many others in the democratic opposition actively collaborated with Intengan.

== Restoration of democracy (1986) ==
After the first People Power revolution, when he had reacquired legal status with the newly installed democratic government, Intengan came home for two months—July and August 1987—in order to conduct political officers' training for the now legal PDSP. He returned to Madrid to finish his S.T.L. and returned to the Philippines in March 1987.

Upon his return to the Philippines, the Jesuit Provincial assigned him to formation work with the Jesuit juniors and philosophers at the Loyola House of Studies and to teach moral theology at the Loyola School of Theology.

Meanwhile, he continued his social ministry, and persevered in his role to preserve and develop the ideology of the PDSP, especially in terms of its societal goals.

Intengan worked to help consolidate the political democracy won through the first People Power revolution and stood against several coup d'état attempts made by extremists, military adventurists and corrupt elements to overthrow the President Corazon C. Aquino's administration.

During this time, Intengan participated in the September 8 Movement and the Konsyensyang Pilipino, and served as spiritual advisor and confessor.

=== Working for peace in Mindanao ===
His interaction and friendship with many Muslims, particularly in the Philippines and largely brought about by the ties between the PDSP and the MNLF, made him aware to their problems, aspirations, and historic grievances. He worked in creating a forum to discuss justice, understanding, reconciliation, and peace between Christians and Muslims.

In relation to the latter, one important intervention were the peace negotiations between the Government of the Republic of the Philippines (GRP) and the Moro National Liberation Front (MNLF) in 1995 and 1996. These provisions included the right to propagate Muslim culture in the Autonomous Region in Muslim Mindanao, and the setting up of a dar-ul-iftah or council of advisers, with official powers to pronounce on the compatibility of ARMM policies and programs with Islamic tenets.

=== Formation of the Bishops – Ulama Conference (BUC) ===
To further Christian-Muslim cooperation, PDSP Chairman Norberto Gonzales and Intengan brought Catholic Christian bishops and the leadership of the Ulama League of the Philippines into a dialogue where they could clarify their perceptions and work together for peace, reconciliation, and authentic development. The first dialogue was held on 16 July 1996 at the Ateneo de Manila University.

This was the beginning of the Bishops – Ulama Forum and has become a significant force for moderation, reason, peace, reconciliation, cooperation and social development through Muslim-Christian dialogue and cooperation, especially in Mindanao.

== Provincial Superior, Society of Jesus ==
=== Appointment by the Superior General ===
On 28 April 1998, by appointment from Very Rev. Peter-Hans Kolvenbach, S.J., Superior General of the Society of Jesus, Intengan took office as Provincial Superior of the Philippine Province of the Society of Jesus.

During the armed hostilities between the Armed Forces of the Philippines (AFP) and the Moro Islamic Liberation Front (MILF) in the year 2000, when the Estrada administration launched its all-out war policy against the MILF, while the Abu Sayyaf was similarly committing atrocities in Basilan, Intengan started and supervised the Philippine Jesuit Solidarity Campaign for Mindanao. This action was aimed to address the humanitarian needs of the civilians, both Muslim and Christian, who suffered as a result of the war and the atrocities committed by the Abu Sayyaf.

==== The impeachment of President Joseph E. Estrada ====
When the faults of the Estrada administration became evident, Intengan and Gonzales joined the movement to convince Estrada to resign. Intengan was one of the signatories of the complaint filed by then Senator Teofisto T. Guingona Jr. for the Estrada's impeachment.

Up until he left Philippine Jesuit Provincial on 12 June 2004, Intengan worked to promote the internal renewal and the apostolic mission of the Philippine Province. He worked to renew the formation program of the Philippine Jesuits; new guidelines which were approved by the General in 2004. He drafted a primer on New Age for the Catholic Bishops´ Conference of the Philippines (CBCP), which the latter approved and circulated in 2003.

==== Chino Roces Freedom Award ====
In September 2002, Intengan was awarded the Chino Roces Freedom award for dedicating his life in fighting for freedom, human rights, social justice, living a mission of life, faith and social reform.

=== After his term as Provincial Superior ===
After his term as Provincial Superior, Intengan represented the CBCP at the International Consultation on New Age, held at the Vatican City from 14 to 16 June 2004 under the joint auspices of the Pontifical Councils on inter-religious dialogue, culture, and promoting Christian unity and the Congregation for the Evangelization of Peoples. During the Consultation Intengan presented one of his major papers, specifically an evaluation of the techniques used by New Age practitioners from a theological and pastoral outlook.

After a sabbatical in the USA and Spain during the school year 2004–2005, Intengan returned to the Loyola House of Studies. He taught moral theology at Loyola School of Theology and served as Vice-Superior of the Theologians’ Subcommunity of the Loyola House of Studies.

Intengan continued to champion human rights, and conduct forums and talks around the country through his non-governmental organizations (NGO) – Center for Strategic Studies (CSS) and Center for People's Rights and Participation (CPRP).

During 2009's typhoon season, Intengan witnessed the devastation and plight of his countrymen in Luzon. He directly intervened and led a relief effort amongst government officials, civil society groups, and his fellow U.P. and Ateneo alumni. The relief goods gathered were distributed from Region II to Region IV and served 18,000 families.

== Final years ==
After 2010, Intengan was active in the foreign relations and national security of the Philippines. In 2017, Intengan was a member of the Philippine Council on Foreign Relations (PCFR) and the National Security Cluster, as part of a joint effort to promote a comprehensive national security framework for the country. They produced a joint document endorsed by the National Security Adviser Hermogenes C. Esperon, which has made a significant contribution to the Government's National Security Strategy.

On October 10, 2017, Intengan suffered a fatal cardiac arrest as he was being transported from the Jesuit Residence to the Quirino Medical Center in Quezon City. His remains lies at the Sacred Heart Novitiate, Quezon City, with his fellow Jesuit confrères.

== Publications ==
1. “Christian Faith, Ideologies and Social Change.” Landas 2, no. 1 (January 1988): 65–80.
2. “Human dignity and human rights: moral aspects.” Landas 7, no. 2 (July 1993): 117–140.
3. “Faith and Politics, Church and State: Church Teaching and the Asian Context, ” in Religion and Politics in the Asian Context. Romeo J. Intengan and George Lobo. FABC Papers, no. 68. Hongkong: Federation of Asian Bishops’ Conferences; Caritas Printing Training Center, 1994: 1–47.
4. “The recent Philippine Church and government dispute: birth regulation, population policy and sex education,” Landas 10, no. 1 (January 1996): 95–123.
5. “Armed Forces of the Philippines: Defender of the Nation, Guardian of Democracy, and Servant of the People: Groundwork for an Essay.” Quezon City: Center for Strategic Studies, 2005.
6. “Philippine Domestic Political Spectrum.” Quezon City: Center for Strategic Studies, 2005.
7. "Christian Faith, Societal Transformation and Ideologies – Philippine Experiences," in Transformative Theological Ethics: East Asian Contexts, ed. Agnes Brazal, Aloysius Cartagenas, Eric Marcelo Genilo, SJ and James Keenan, SJ. Quezon City: Ateneo de Manila University Press (forthcoming).
