= Battle of Concepción, Chile =

The Battle of Concepción, Chile, refers to all the engagements that occurred in the city of Concepción, both in its previous location and in its current location: (Note: Concepción was founded in 1550 where the city of Penco is located today. Due to the earthquakes and tsunamis that devastated the city in 1570, 1657, 1687, 1730 and 1751, it was moved in 1765 to the Mocha Valley, where it is located today.)

- Battle of Penco (1550), an engagement of the Arauco War
- Destruction of Concepción (1554), an event of the Arauco War
- Destruction of Concepción (1555), an engagement of the Arauco War
- Siege of Concepción (1564), an engagement of the Arauco War
- Capture of Concepción (1814), an engagement of the Chilean War of Independence
- Battle of Alameda de Concepción (1820), an engagement of the Chilean War of Independence

== See also ==
- Concepción
