= Urbano González Serrano =

Spanish intellectual (1848–1904)

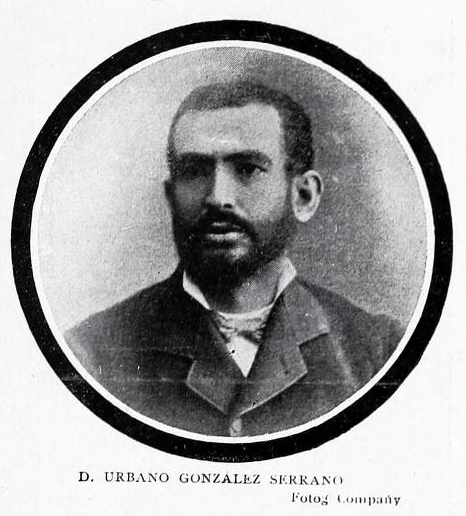
González in Blanco y Negro

Urbano González Serrano (Navalmoral de la Mata, 25 May 1848 — Madrid, 13 January 1904) was a Spanish philosopher, sociologist, psychologist, pedagogue, literary critic, and politician. Juan Antonio Garcia posited González was the principal developer of krausoposivitismo, a mixture of positivism and Krausism. These beliefs were determined by Yvan Lissorgues as an amalgamation of "abstract idealism of the Hegelian type and extrapolations of some philosophers and scientists".

== Biography ==
=== Life ===
On 25 May 1848, González was born in Navalmoral de la Mata to a notary. Since adolescence, he was influenced by Catholicism. He finished primary education in his hometown and in 1861, moved to Madrid and registered for boarding in a collegiate church, where he met Nicolás Salmerón, whom he established a lifelong friendship. In 1864, he enrolled in the Complutense University of Madrid for a degree in philosophy and letters. There he met Manuel de la Revilla, introducing him to positivism. In 1869, he graduated with his doctoral thesis Estudios Sobre los Principios de Los Moral con Relación a la Doctrina Positivista. He was assistant to the vacant chair of logic at the novitiate institute of Madrid from 1868 to 1869. In the 1870s, he became interested in sociology. He then worked at the Complutense University of Madrid as professor of metaphysics; in 1873, he gained the chairmanship of psychology, logic, and ethics at IES San Isidro, never exchanging for another. The same year he substituted Salmerón's directorship at the Colegio Internacional de Salmerón for long periods. He frequented the Ateneo de Madrid and participated in intellectual debates, such as that against Émile Zola over naturalism. He began to follow Spanish thought of Krausism, being named a "krausopositivista". He was friends with Adolfo González Posada, Manuel Sales y Ferré, José Moreno Nieto, Gumersindo de Azcárate, Miguel de Unamuno, and José Martínez Ruiz. At this time he taught Leopoldo Alas, who he also befriended.

He became director of Salmerón's, then president of the Institución Libre de Enseñanza, international school. He became involved in politics and was elected member in the third Cortes de la Restauración in 1881. The same year he was appointed president of the Circulo nacional de la Juventad. La sociología cientifica (1884) was a pioneering work for the introduction of sociology into Spain; in it, he however denied sociologists' equation of social and natural entities. He also saw no definitive solution to debates between naturalism and spiritualism. In 1891, he joined Salmerón's Centralist Republican Party.

He translated works from German, and co-edited an edition of the poetry of Ramón de Campoamor.

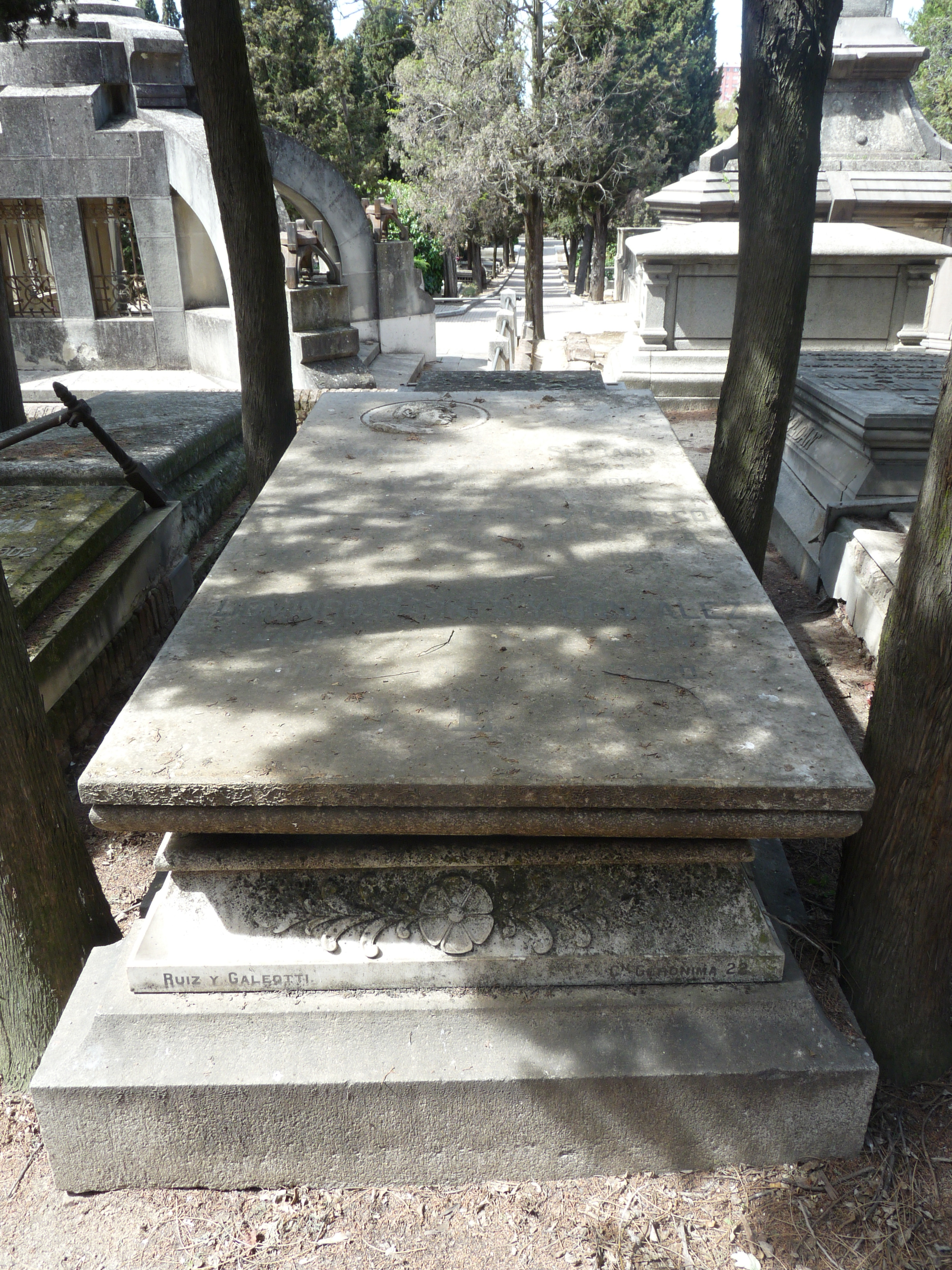
González's tomb in the Cementerio civil de Madrid

=== Beliefs ===
Like other Krausists, Catholic influence on his ideas lessened and he criticized Catholic dogma. González argued for positivist elements in Krausism as he saw the adherents of the base ideology as idealistic, inactive isolationists, among them Francisco Giner de los Ríos. Neo-Kantian positivist Manuel de la Revilla agreed and they worked to establish their separate positivist spaces. González's work on physiological psychology was the first in Spain and questioned absolute empiricism. He rejected Wundtian experimentalism's reduction to sensation, positing experimentation and speculation as knowledge acquisition's basis. González believed the soul was more than cognition, but rather encompassed all physiological experience, in line with modernists William James and Franz Brentano. He also believed New Psychology, as an alternative to Cartesianism and French spiritualism, failed at body-soul dualism. In 1883, González determined Herbert Spencer falsely equated physiological and social organisms as well as intelligence and reason with imagination. A year later he crudités Darwinism and evolutionists as failing to recognize salvation and redemption. However, in an article from Seville-based Revista Mensual de Literatura, Filosofía y Ciencias, he agreed with Antonio Machado Núñez and Fernando de Castro Pajares that naturalism could coexist with Krausist "harmonic rationing". By 1883, Juan Valera y Alcalá-Galiano, among others, believed González was more positivist than Krausist; from his 1888 positive turn towards positivism, he was criticized in Revista Contemporánea. In 1891, José Martínez Ruiz criticized González for his positivism and overlooking of social circumstance and environment in his literary criticism.

== Works ==
- Estudio sobre los principios de la moral con relación a la doctrina positivista Madrid: Imprenta Española, 1871.
- Elementos de Lógica Madrid, 1874.
- Estudios de moral y de filosofía Madrid: Librerías de Francisco Iravedra: Antonio Novo, 1875.
- Translation of Berthold Auerbach's Benito Espinosa, Madrid: Medina y Navarro. 1878.
- En pro y en contra (críticas) Madrid: Librería de Victoriano Suárez, sin año.
- Preocupaciones sociales: ensayos de psicología popular Plasencia, 1882.
- Manual de psicología, lógica y ética para el estudio elemental de esta asignatura Madrid, 1883
- Fundamentos de la Sociología: memoria leída en el Ateneo de Madrid, en la sesión inaugural de la Sección de Ciencias morales y políticas, el 10 de Noviembre de 1882 Plasencia, 1883.
- Cuestiones contemporáneas: la crítica religiosa, el pesimismo, el naturalismo artístico Madrid, 1883.
- La sociología cientifica Madrid: Librería de Fernando Fe; Sevilla : Librería de los Hijos de Fe, 1884.
- La sabiduría popular Madrid: Librería de Escribano y Echevarría, 1886.
- Crítica y filosofía Madrid: Biblioteca Económica Filosófica, 1888.
- La asociación como ley general de la educación Barcelona : Librería de Juan y Antonio Bastinos, 1888.
- Goethe: ensayos críticos Madrid, 1892. Lleva prólogo de Leopoldo Alas.
- Estudios críticos, Madrid, 1892.
- With Concepción Saiz Otero, Cartas ... ¿pedagógicas? (ensayos de psicología pedagógica). Madrid: Librería de Victoriano Suárez, 1895. Prólogo de Adolfo Posada.
- Psicología del amor Madrid: Librería de Fernando Fe, 1897.
- Siluetas. Madrid: B. Rodriguez Serra, 1899.
- La literatura del día (1900–1903). Barcelona: Heinrich y Cía. 1903.
- Nicolás Sameróny Alonso (Estudio Crítico Biográfico). Madrid: Edit. Fernando Fé. 1903.

== See also ==
- Anti-clericalism
- Generation of '98
- Luis Simarro Lacabra
- Liberalism and radicalism in Spain
- Philosophy of mind
- Restoration (Spain)
- Théodule-Armand Ribot

== Sources ==
Bibliography

- García Fraile, Juan Antonio (1994). "Un intento de posítivación del krausismo. Algunos aspectos de la psicopedagogía de Urbano González Serrano". Revista complutense de educación. 5 (1): 215–232. ISSN 1130-2496.
- Johnson, Roberta (2014). Crossfire: Philosophy and the Novel in Spain, 1900-1934. Lexington: The University Press of Kentucky. ISBN 978-0-8131-4967-7.
