= Bishop of Concepción =

Bishop of Concepción may refer to:

- Bishop of Concepción, a diocese in the Anglican Church of Chile
- Archbishop of Concepción, of the Roman Catholic Archdiocese of Concepción in Chile

== See also ==
- Concepción (disambiguation)
