= Partido Demokratiko Sosyalista ng Pilipinas =

Partido Demokratiko Sosyalista ng Pilipinas Philippine Democratic Socialist Party
- President: Norberto Gonzales
- Chairman: Norberto Gonzales
- Founder: Norberto Gonzales; Romeo Intengan
- Founded: May 1, 1973; 50 years ago
- Headquarters: 180 Katipunan St. corner Narra St., Marikina City, Metro Manila
- Youth wing: Kabataang Nagkakaisa sa Diwa at Layunin ng Sambayanan - KANDILA
- Ideology: Social democracy Democratic socialism Grassroots politics
- Political position: Center-left
- National affiliation: TEAM Unity (2007); K4 (2004); UNIDO (1980-1986)
- International affiliation: Socialist International
- Colors: Red White and Green
- Seats in the Senate: 0 / 24
- Seats in the House of Representatives: 0 / 316

The Partido Demokratiko Sosyalista ng Pilipinas (PDSP), also known as Philippine Democratic Socialist Party, is a political party in the Philippines. It is one of the member parties that composed the United Nationalist Democratic Organization (UNIDO) that supported the candidacy of Corazon Aquino and Salvador Laurel in the 1986 Snap Elections against President Ferdinand Marcos.

In the year 2000, the PDSP mobilized with civil society organizations and groups in support of the impeachment, which led to eventual removal of former President Joseph Estrada from office.

== History ==
Established on May 1, 1973, the PDSP played a leading role in the difficult task of establishing and expanding a progressive and democratic alternative to the Marcos dictatorship and to Marxism-Leninism. It made an important contribution to the mass campaigns which eventually led to the People Power revolution in 1986.

The PDSP then helped much to consolidate the newly restored democracy, especially through education and mobilization among the small farmers and fisherfolk, workers, urban poor, women, youth, Bangsamoro, and the indigenous peoples of Luzon, Visayas and Mindanao.

The PDSP, mainly through its members in people's organizations and non-government organizations, has helped much to draft laws and government regulations, especially in relation to issues and concerns of farmers, fishermen, workers, urban poor, women, and other sectors of Philippine society.

The Party was accredited by the Commission on Elections (COMELEC) as a legitimate political party in 1990.

In 1992, the party became a consultative member of the Socialist International (SI). In 2019, the PDSP was granted full member status in the SI.

Starting in 1996, the PDSP actively participated in the interfaith dialogues held between Christian and Muslim groups in the Philippines. These series of events led to the formation of the Bishops Ulama Conference (BUC) with Romeo Intengan, S.J. and Dr. Mahid M. Mutilan.

=== Beginnings ===
- 1970: merger of Hasik Kalayaan (headed by Mr. Norberto B. Gonzales) and Kilusan ng mga Anak ng Kalayaan (headed by Dr. Romeo J. Intengan)
- April 1971: ideological seminar: participants who remained in the group: Norberto Gonzales, Fernando Gonzales, Antonio Asper, Gregorio Nazarrea, Romeo J. Intengan
- 7 July 1972: Katipunan ng mga Demokratiko-Sosyalistang Pilipino (KDSP): Democratic Socialist orientation; Norberto Gonzales as Secretary General

=== Martial Law Years ===
- 1977: foundation of Katipunan ng Bayan para sa Kalayaan ( KABAKA ), bringing together moderate opposition to the Marcos regime;the PDSP was a leading part of this
- early 1980: transfer of headquarters to Mindanao
- December 1980: party leadership holds dialogues with the Moro National Liberation Front (MNLF)
- May and June 1982: Malaysian government allows PDSP members to go home or into exile, under benign conditions; Chair Norberto Gonzales and Education Department Head Fr. Romeo J. Intengan make their way to Europe
- August 1982: party leadership in exile establishes headquarters in Madrid, Spain, under the protection of fraternal party Partido Socialista Obrero Español ( PSOE); contacts with the Socialist International began; ties forged with the Movement for a Free Philippines (MFP) and other democratic groups opposed to the Marcos regime
- February 1986: PDSP plays a prominent part in the mobilization for People Power I.

=== Gloria Macapagal Arroyo administration ===
- August 2000 to January 2001: the PDSP plays a major role in mobilizing groups supporting the impeachment of former President Joseph Ejercito Estrada, the impeachment and walkout by members of the Philippine Senate results to the Second EDSA Revolution.
- PDSP enters the administration coalition, with party Chair Norberto Gonzales becoming Presidential Adviser for Special Concerns in 2001, and becoming National Security Adviser in 2005.
- 27–29 December 2003: Special Congress of the PDSP, at Bay View Hotel, Manila; Norberto Gonzales re-elected Chair, Elizabeth Angsioco elected Vice-Chair, Timoteo Aranjuez elected General Secretary
- January 2007: Atty. Ramel Muria becomes Acting General Secretary
- 27 July 2007: Norberto Gonzales is appointed Secretary of National Defense.

PDSP Secretary-General, Danilo R. Yang, a human rights defender and Provincial Board Member in Laguna, was assassinated by alleged members of the Communist Party of the Philippines–New People's Army (CPP-NPA) in June 2009. In 2013 and 2014 the gunmen responsible for the assassination of Mr. Yang were arrested by the Philippine National Police.

The Party has strongly opposed the electoral participation of party list groups Bayan Muna, Anakpawis, and Gabriela. The PDSP has issued statements that the armed struggle distorts the democratic process by extorting permit-to-campaign fees from candidates and bans campaigns of certain candidates in their areas of control.

On September 30, 2021, PDSP Chairperson Norberto Gonzales expressed his willingness to run for President in the incoming 2022 presidential and local elections, reaffirming their views of elections as vehicles for change.

== Party platform ==
As a social democratic party, the PDSP participates in the political processes of the state, insisting on elections as a legitimate and viable means of achieving socialism. It opposes taking the extralegal route preferred and deemed necessary by Marxist–Leninist–Maoist national democrats.

According to their party platform, they affirm the vision for a first world Philippines and had released a document titled Building a New Philippines. Good politics and governance can provide the foundation for an upright, disciplined and prosperous country. The document is summarised into three major points:

- the social initiative of like-minded groups and organizations to actively contribute in discussions and fora;
- a new breed of leaders that cultivate others and lead by example: patriots imbued and guided by a deep sense of nationalism; and
- a program of developing the country economically, politically and culturally.

As such, the party holds thirteen principles:

- the human being as an embodied spirit or a psychocorporeal being;
- the human being's normal capacity for personhood, entailing ethical responsibility, rights and duties;
- the essential equality of human beings;
- the social nature of human beings and the state as a natural institution;
- the principle of subsidiarity;
- preferential option for the poor and marginalized;
- work as a right and duty of human beings;
- the obligation to patriotism;
- the rights of nations;
- the universal purpose of property or custodianship for the common good;
- the transcendent moral responsibility of human beings and the primacy of moral law;
- the moral ambivalence of human persons; and
- the abuse of power in all fields of human activity as the real structural origin of alienation.

Party officials:

- President: Norberto Gonzales

== Electoral performance ==
=== For president ===
| Election | Candidate | Number of votes | Share of votes | Outcome of election |
|---|---|---|---|---|
| 1986 | Supported Corazon Aquino who won | | | |
| 1992 | N/A | | | Fidel V. Ramos (Lakas) |
| 1998 | N/A | | | Joseph Ejercito Estrada (LAMMP) |
| 2004 | Supported Gloria Macapagal Arroyo who won | | | |
| 2010 | N/A | | | Benigno Aquino III (LP) |
| 2016 | N/A | | | Rodrigo Duterte (PDPLBN) |
| 2022 | Norberto Gonzales | 90,656 | 0.17 | Lost |

=== For vice president ===
| Election | Candidate | Number of votes | Share of votes | Outcome of election |
|---|---|---|---|---|
| 1986 | Supported Salvador Laurel who won | | | |
| 1992 | N/A | | | Joseph Ejercito Estrada (NPC) |
| 1998 | N/A | | | Gloria Macapagal Arroyo (Lakas) |
| 2004 | N/A | | | Noli de Castro (Ind.) |
| 2010 | N/A | | | Jejomar Binay (PDPLBN) |
| 2016 | N/A | | | Leni Robredo (LP) |
| 2022 | N/A | | | Sara Duterte (Lakas) |

=== Senate ===
| Election | Number of votes | Share of votes | Seats won | Seats after | Outcome of election |
|---|---|---|---|---|---|
| 1995 | 482,328 | 0.26% | 0 / 12 | 0 / 24 | Lost |
| 1998 | Did not participate | | | | |
| 2001 | 503,437 | 0.21% | 0 / 13 | 0 / 24 | Lost |
| 2004 | Did not participate | | | | |
| 2007 | 2,488,994 | 0.93% | 0 / 12 | 0 / 24 | Lost |
| 2010 | Did not participate | | | | |
| 2013 | Did not participate | | | | |
| 2016 | Did not participate | | | | |
| 2019 | 347,013 | 0.10% | 0 / 12 | 0 / 24 | Lost |
| 2022 | Did not participate | | | | |
| 2025 | 990,091 | 0.23% | 0 / 12 | 0 / 24 | Lost |

=== House of Representatives ===
| Election | Number of votes for PDSP | Share of votes | Seats | Outcome of election |
|---|---|---|---|---|
| 1992 | Did not participate | | 0 / 214 | Did not participate |
| 1995 | 7,563 | 0.04% | 0 / 220 | Lost |
| 1998 | 8,850 | 0.04% | 0 / 257 | Lost |
| 2001 | | | 1 / 256 | Joined the majority bloc |
| 2004 | | | 1 / 261 | Joined the majority bloc |
| 2007 | | | 3 / 271 | Joined the majority bloc |
| 2010 | 171,345 | 0.50 | 1 / 286 | Joined the majority bloc |
| 2013 | Did not participate | | | |
| 2016 | Did not participate | | | |
| 2019 | 56,223 | 0.14 | 0 / 304 | Lost |
| 2022 | 78,029 | 0.16 | 0 / 316 | Lost |
| 2025 | 14,343 | 0.03 | 0 / 317 | Lost |

== Notable members ==
| Norberto B. Gonzales | former Secretary of National Defense |
| Romeo J. Intengan | former Provincial, Society of Jesus |
| Sultan Jamalul D. Kiram III | Sultan of Sulu |
| Danilo R. Yang | former Secretary General, Board Member, Laguna |
| Attorney Sonny Matula | former President of Federation of Free Workers |
| Attorney Ramel C. Muria | Faculty member, Far Eastern University |
| Jovit G. Reyes | former Mayor, Pangil, Laguna |
| Wilmer L. Borbon | former Mayor, Danglas, Abra |
| Bernard F. Austria | Labor Leader and Community Organizer |
