= Concepción Province =

Concepción Province may refer to:

- Concepción Province, Chile
- Concepción Province, Peru

== See also ==
- Concepción (disambiguation)
