= Conchita =

Conchita is originally a diminutive for the Spanish feminine given name Concepción. Conxita is the Catalan equivalent. Conchita is also the diminutive of concha (seashell).

Conchita may refer to:

== People ==
- Conchita Anes (1929/30–2004), Gibraltarian politician
- Conchita Badía, Spanish soprano and pianist
- Conchita Cabrera de Armida (1862–1937), Mexican author and mystic
- Conchita Campbell (born 1995), Canadian actress
- Conchita Carpio Morales (born 1941), Philippine Ombudsman
- Conchita Cintrón (1922–2009), Peruvian bullfighter
- Conchita Leeflang, Surinamese singer
- Conxita Marsol Riart (born 1960), Andorran lawyer and politician
- Conchita Martínez (born 1972), Spanish professional tennis player
- Conxita Mora Jordana, Andorran politician
- Conchita (musician) (born 1981), Spanish singer
- Concepcion Picciotto (1936–2016), American protester
- Conchita Wurst (born 1988), Austrian singer
- Conxita Julià (1920–2019), Catalan nationalist and poet

== Other ==
- Conchita (beetle), a genus of hister beetle
- Conchita (opera), an opera by composer Riccardo Zandonai
- "Conchita" (song) by Lou Bega
- Conchita (album), debut studio album by Conchita Wurst
