= Concepción District =

Concepción District may refer to:

== Paraguay ==
- Concepción, Paraguay

== Peru ==
- Concepción District, Concepción, in Concepción province, Junín region
- Concepción District, Vilcas Huamán, in Vilcas Huamán province, Ayacucho region

== Costa Rica ==
- Concepción District, Alajuelita, in Alajuelita, San José province
- Concepción District, Atenas, in Atenas, Alajuela province
- Concepción District, La Unión, in La Unión, Cartago province
- Concepción District, San Isidro, in San Isidro, Heredia province
- Concepción District, San Rafael, in San Rafael, Heredia province
- Concepción District, San Ramón, in San Ramón, Alajuela province
