= La Purísima Concepción =

La Purísima Concepción may refer to one of several Spanish missions, including the following:

== Places ==
- Mission La Purísima Concepción in Lompoc, California
- Rancho La Purísima Concepción in Los Altos Hills, California
- Mission Puerto de Purísima Concepción near Yuma, Arizona
- Misión de la Purísima Concepción de Aquico in Hawikuh Ruins, New Mexico
- Mission Concepcion in San Antonio, Texas
- Purísima Concepción, Las Marías, Puerto Rico, a barrio
- Misión La Purísima Concepción de Cadegomó in Baja California Sur

== Other uses ==
- Spanish ship Purísima Concepción (1779), A Spanish ship of the line

== See also ==
- Concepción (disambiguation)
- Immaculate Conception (disambiguation), the English term
- La Purísima (disambiguation)
- Purísima
