= Battle of La Concepción =

1882 battle during the War of the Pacific

- Part of the Breña campaign
- Concepción is a little town at the Mantaro River. Roads and railroads at that time are drawn.
Date	9–10 July 1882
Location	Concepción, Peru
Result	Peruvian victory

Belligerents
Peru	Chile

Commanders and leaders
(Peru) Juan Gastó	(Chile) Ignacio Carrera †

Strength
1,000 soldiers	77 soldiers

Casualties and losses
40 killed, more than 100 wounded.	77 killed

The Battle of La Concepción (Spanish: Batalla de Concepción) was fought between Chilean and Peruvian forces on July 9 and 10, 1882, during the Breña campaign of the War of the Pacific. Heavily outnumbered, the Chilean detachment of 77 men under the command of Captain Ignacio Carrera Pinto was annihilated by a 1,300-strong Peruvian force, many of them armed with spears, commanded by Col. Juan Gasto and Ambrosio Salazar after a 27-hour fight in the small town of Concepción in the Peruvian Andes.

== Background ==
After the defeat at Miraflores and the invasion of the Peruvian capital city Lima, many Peruvian officers escaped to the mountains and organized resistance. Among these men was Col. Andrés Avelino Cáceres, who successfully gained the sympathies of the farmers who had lived totally disconnected from the preceding campaigns.

The Chilean occupation was directed by the recently appointed Admiral Patricio Lynch, who sent a division divided into several columns with the intention of sweeping the Andes and gaining control of the towns in the region. The first major force to be sent was a division under the command of Col Ambrosio Letelier, who was successful in his task, but committed abuses against the population. He was recalled to Lima and sent to Santiago to be court-martialed. The abuses perpetrated by Letelier's division generated discontent and hate for the invading troops, allowing Cáceres to increase his troops easily.

In Lima, the Battle of Sangra took place on June 26, 1881, at the Hacienda de Sangrar, where a Chilean company commanded by José Luis Araneda fought with Peruvian forces commanded by Manuel Encarnación Vento.

In 1882, Col. Estanislao del Canto was sent to the Junin Department with orders to maintain control on the region and to find and eliminate Cáceres forces. Del Canto's division had about 2,300 men and was formed from the "Tacna" 2nd Line, Lautaro and "Chacabuco" 6th Line Infantry battalions, one "Yungay Carabiners" Cav. Squadron, and one artillery brigade from the 1st Artillery Regt.

At Pucara on February 5, Cáceres' and del Canto's forces clashed. On the 22nd, Cáceres defeated his fellow Peruvian Col. Arnaldo Panizo at Acuchimay, taking control of Panizo's army and increasing his own.

== Peruvian situation ==
=== Ambrosio Salazar guerrillas ===
Ambrosio Salazar Márquez was sent by Cáceres to organize a guerrilla unit in Comas, but his attempt to organize was rejected by the rural farmers.

Chileans sacked rural ranches in Huancayo, and the mayor of Comas asked Salazar to resume organizing. Salazar armed two columns of residents, one with 30 guns and 50 men. They achieved a victory in Sierra Lumi, where they acquired more weapons and support from the population. Salazar sent a request to Cáceres for military support.

The guerrillas from Comas lacked weapons, the peasants being armed only with spears. The peasants arrested Salazar in early July 1882 on the arrival of two columns sent by Cáceres to reorganize the guerrillas with orders to attack Concepción.

Ambrosio Salazar commanded the columns Cazadores de Comas and Guerrilla Andamarca who accompanied them with reinforcements.

=== Cáceres forces ===
The news of the Chilean situation reached Cáceres, who saw an opportunity to destroy the entire division fighting them in their garrisons. He decided to launch a simultaneous attack on several Chilean garrisons in the Andes. Gasto, with Pucara Nº4 and America battalions, plus the Libres de Ayacucho columns, was to join the Salazar guerrillas (montoneras) at Comas and to march toward Concepcion. Meanwhile, Col. Maximo Tafur was sent to La Oroya, with the objective of destroying the bridge there and closing any escape route for del Canto. Cáceres himself, with the rest of his troops would attack the 4th company of the "Santiago" 5th Line Battalion at Marcavalle.

== Situation of the Chilean garrison ==
Del Canto's division was scattered through the southern region of the Peruvian Andes, divided into small groups stationed in several towns and enduring a severe lack of supplies including food, clothes, shoes, and ammunition, and heavy casualties from disease and the cold of these heights. In fact, the most common causes of death in the Chilean division were typhus and frostbite. The Chilean high command was reasonably very concerned about the situation of the soldiers, and requested of the Chilean authorities permission to leave the mountains, but these requests fell on deaf ears. When the situation turned desperate, Col. del Canto himself traveled to Lima to request authorization to retreat. After the report of Dr. Jovino Novoa about the troops' situation, permission to retreat was granted.

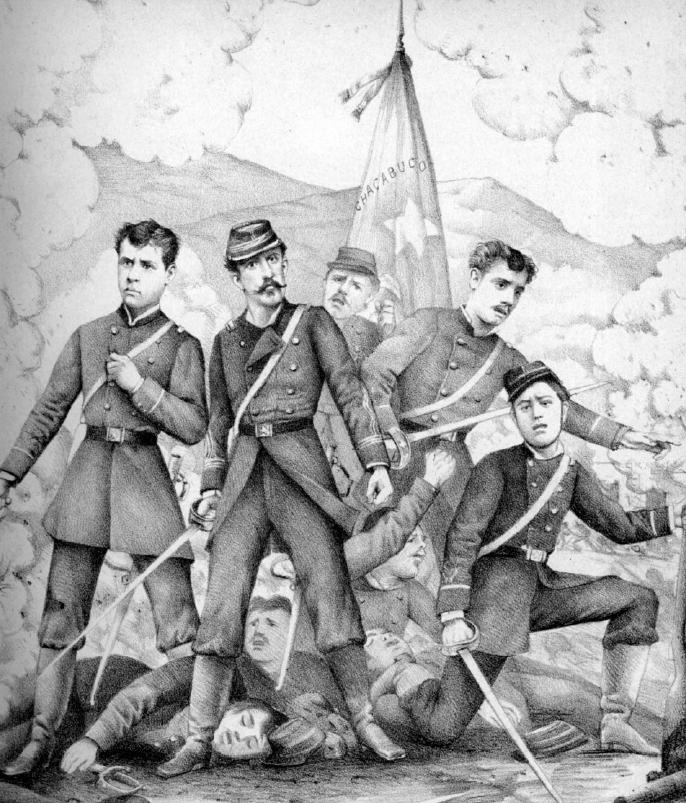
Captain Ignacio Carrera Pinto, Lieutenant Julio Montt Salamanca and Second Lieutenants Arturo Perez Canto and Luis Cruz Martinez in La Concepción (Drawing by Luis Fernando Rojas)

After an initial success, the lack of supplies and medicines, combined with high mortality among Chilean lines owing to unknown illnesses and cold temperatures, forced Estanislao del Canto to retreat from the Andes to Lima. The plan was to evacuate the division while marshaling the scattered garrisons as the column left the mountains.

The garrison posted at Concepcion was the 4th company of the "Chacabuco" 6th Line Battalion, consisting of 77 soldiers under the command of Lieutenant Ignacio Carrera Pinto. Unknown to him, he had been promoted to captain, but he would never receive the promotion. Along with the soldiers traveled two women, one of them pregnant and about to deliver. Eleven men were sick at the time of the battle. The garrison also lacked ammunition, having only one hundred rounds per soldier.

Carrera Pinto was waiting for the retiring division in order to join it and continuing refolding from the Andes. Although no attack was expected, he maintained the garrison on alert status. He did not know that when Col. del Canto finally could leave his position at Huancayo, its south wing was defeated by Cáceres' followers at Marcavalle, delaying again the advance of the Chilean troops towards Concepcion. Meanwhile, the montoneras of Ambrosio Salazar and the Peruvian regular forces of Juan Gasto were already gathered at Leon hill and waiting for the attack signal.

By 14:00 of July 9, the Chilean sentries sounded the alarm announcing the presence of enemy troops. The Chileans could see on the surrounding hills the Peruvian troops and several hundred shouting farmers ready to invade the town. The Peruvian troops outnumbered the Chilean forces by 17 to 1.

=== Chilean battle plan ===
Since he was outnumbered, Carrera Pinto's plan was to fortify the garrison at the town central square, blocking its four corners, and to resist there until del Canto's arrival. He accordingly divided the troops into three groups to defend each of the entrances to the square, occupying the following positions: on the northern corner, Arturo Perez Canto with the first group; on the northwestern, Luis Cruz Martinez with another twenty soldiers; on the southeastern, Julio Montt Salamanca with twenty more. Carrera Pinto, with the remaining sixteen, occupied the southwestern corner. When the enemy overpowered these positions, the troops would retreat to the town's church.

== The battle ==
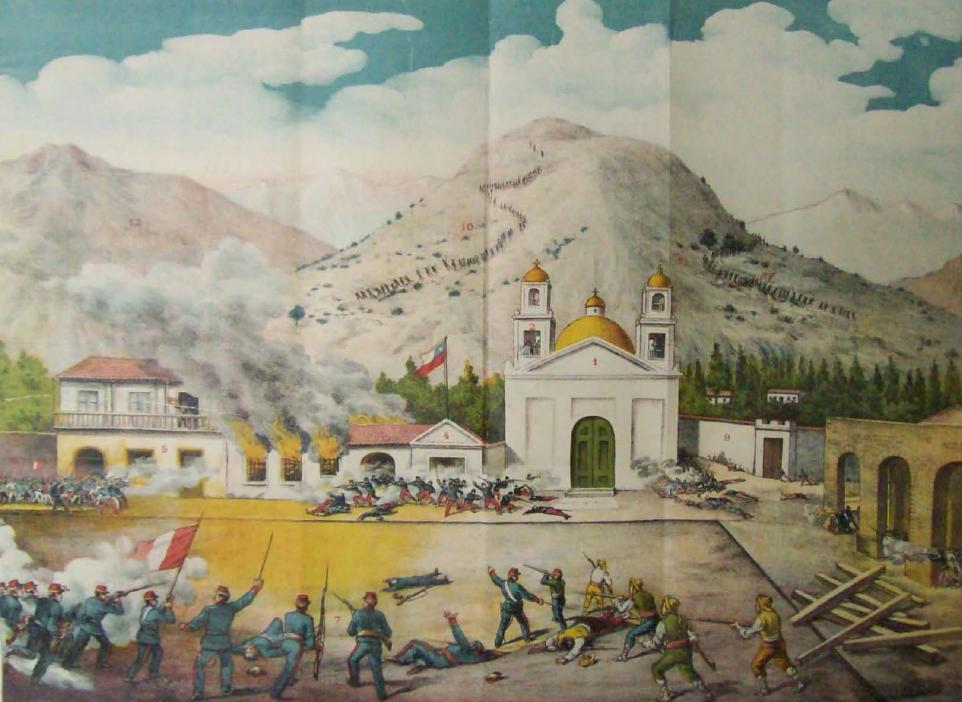
Battle of La Concepción

On July 8 Salazar's forces left Comas, arriving that night in San Antonio de Ocopa, where they made camp. There Bishop Manuel Teodoro del Valle reported the movement of forces in Concepcion. On July 9 they marched from Santa Rosa Ocopa through Alayo, Quichuay, and Lastay. In Concepcion, Salazar decided to attack with only the forces under his command, the columns Cazadores de Comas and Guerrilla de Andamarca. On the same day the guerrillas from Quichuay and Vilca, commanded by the Salazar brothers, and guerrillas from San Jeronimo under the command of Melchor Gonzales, all arrived to serve as reinforcements.

The Chilean division of Del Canto, after leaving Huancayo, was attacked by Cáceres' Peruvian forces, delaying his return to Concepción. At 13:30 that Sunday, Del Canto received a note from Capt. Carrera Pinto reported no problems in Concepción.

At 14:30 Peruvian forces appeared on the tops of the hills of Piedra Parada and El Leon in Concepción.

Peruvian forces began to descend toward the square: Ambrosio Salazar with the guerrillas in the south from El Leon and the soldiers of Juan Gasto from Piedra Parada, encircling the town. The Chilean forces mixed bayonet attacks with rifle fire.

From one of the flanks, the peasants of Comas advanced towards their enemy. The Chilean soldiers, aligned in a double row formation, opened fire on the approaching forces. In a second attack, the Chileans received sniper fire from the roofs and windows of the surrounding buildings, causing seven casualties. Carrera Pinto tried a bayonet charge in order to break the siege and escape, but was wounded in his left arm, leaving him no choice but to fall back to the church and garrison his troops inside.

Juan Gastó installed a command post to direct his forces and as a relief center for the wounded. The Peruvian attack continued, including sniper fire from roofs and windows, until all of the Chileans retreated to the center of the square, a very exposed position. All soldiers took defensive positions, including the wounded.

At 19:00 the guerrillas of Orcotuna, commanded by Teodosio Lopez, and Mito, commanded by Aurelio Gutierres, arrived to reinforce the Peruvian troops.

The Chilean lieutenant, aware of the desperate situation, sent three soldiers to connect with del Canto's division stationed at Huancayo and to inform them of the attack they were sustaining. All failed to escape Concepcion and were killed. In the dark of night, the Chilean forces attempted to leave Huancayo but failed and returned to their position.

Gasto sent a parliamentarian trying to convince Carrera Pinto to surrender, but his plea was refused when the latter sent him a reply letter.

To the Chilean garrison Commander. Present. Considering that our forces, which surround Concepcion, are numerically superior to the ones under your command, and wishing to avoid an obviously impossible fight, I suggest you unconditionally surrender your forces, guaranteeing respect for your officers and soldiers' lives. In the case of a negative reply, the forces under my command shall proceed with the utmost energy in the discharging of their duties. May God keep you

— Juan Gasto

In the capital of Chile, in one of its main streets, stands immortalized in bronze the statue of the father of our Independence, General Don Jose Miguel Carrera, whose own blood runs through my veins; that's why you will understand that neither as a Chilean nor as a descendant of him will I be intimidated by the number of your troops nor by the obligatory threats. May God keep you.

— Ignacio Carrera Pinto

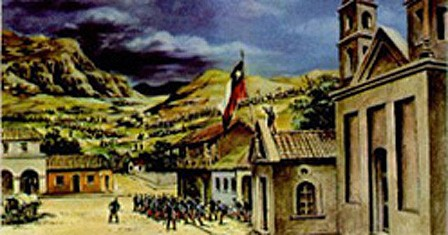
Drawing of the Battle of La Concepcion

== Second attack and ending ==
Col. Juan Gastó reported to Ambrosio Salazar that he was withdrawing from Concepción, leaving to Salazar the task of taking the barracks. Adding to the attacking troops with eleven people with their own rifles was Dr. Tello Santiago Manrique, who joined the Peruvian troops that night.

Ambrosio Salazar ordered Cipriano Camacachi and Pablo Bellido to spray with fuel the roofs of the convent to force out the Chileans, who returned fire from the windows of the building. The pregnant woman, a barmaid who was in labor, delivered a child.

The Chileans largely exhausted their ammunition trying to repel this new attack. The Peruvians managed to set the church roof on fire.

Carrera Pinto and the survivors tried to take refuge in a house adjacent to the church and to resist the Peruvians there. Although a soldier informed him of the Peruvian forces, he decided to stage yet another bayonet charge, saying: "Chileans do not surrender! Long live Chile!" He then led another bayonet charge with some soldiers, killing some guerrillas, and was killed by Peruvian riflemen.

Salazar's guerrillas occupied the roofs and walls, attacking the Chileans in their last positions inside the church.

The Chilean soldiers took their commanding officer's body and retreated to the burning church. Another attack from a horde of montoneros managed to penetrate the wall of the church but was repelled by another bayonet attack of some twelve Chilean soldiers led by 2nd Lieutenant Arturo Perez Canto.

At 07:00 on July 10, guerrillas from Apata commanded by Andrés Avelino Ponce and spear-armed guerrillas from Paccha commanded by Andrés Bedoya Seijas arrived. The guerrillas opened fire on 2nd. Lt. Cruz Martinez and his troops. At 10:00 the Chileans were out of ammunition, and fire and smoke from their torches forced them to leave the church.

At around 1100 on the morning of July 10, the Chilean garrison was reduced to only nine soldiers under the command of 2nd Lt. Luis Cruz Martinez (15 years old). Another attack caused another 4 dead on the Chilean side. Salazar asked the survivors to accept an honorable surrender.

Cruz Martínez refused this latest offer of surrender, saying "For the fatherland, Chileans will never surrender!", after these words he ordered a final rifle barrage, and then led a bayonet charge with his remaining soldiers, all of whom were killed by Peruvian gunfire. Sadly, Gasto could not prevent the women and the newborn from being killed and dismembered by montoneros and several soldiers. He left the town later in the day.

== Aftermath ==
After a 27-hour battle, the Peruvian army had suffered more than 40 casualties (injured or killed) based on Ambrosio Salazar's official report. All of the Chilean soldiers were killed.

At noon, the Chilean reinforcement column from Huancayo appeared. After it emerged that all 77 Chilean soldiers had died and that two women and a newborn had been killed, decapitated and dismembered, a cavalry troop was sent with orders to kill every man between sixteen and fifty years old and to burn down the town of Concepcion.

In the city there were only 20 people left; 18 were executed immediately, including an elder Mr. Salazar, and two managed to escape to the hills. All of the houses were looted and burned by the Chileans.

— Manuel F. Horta, reporter for the newspaper El Eco de Junín. August 26, 1882

Col. Del Canto ordered that the hearts of the four officers: Captain Ignacio Carrera Pinto, Lieutenant Julio Montt, and Second Lieutenants Arturo Perez Canto and Luis Cruz Martinez, be extracted and sent in formalin to Santiago. The remains of the 77 Chileans were buried beside the church. Only in 1911, in one of Santiago, Chile's churches, were the hearts of the 4 officers killed permanently interred with a marker dedicated to the memory of all 77 killed in these two memorable days in Chilean history.

This battle has a strong meaning for both countries. In Chile, every July 9 the Day of the National Flag (Spanish: Día de la Bandera) is celebrated, in remembrance of those who chose to die defending their flag rather than surrender. For the Peruvians, it is a milestone for their resistance in the face of invaders and a triumph, considering how immensely poorly equipped they were. Concepcion is one of Peru's Heroic Cities and on the day of the Peruvian victory, in its honor a national youth Marching band competition is held here.

Every July 9, all across Chile in ceremonies marking the final Chilean military defeat, the battle is commemorated by the famous Juramento de la Bandera (Pledge to the Flag) recited throughout Chile in memory of the battle, by the officers, warrant officers, non-commissioned officers, enlisted personnel, officer cadets and NCO cadets of the Chilean Army to the Flag of Chile, a solemn yearly tradition ever since it was first recited on July 9, 1939.

== Bibliography ==
- Cáceres, Andrés (1972). La Guerra del Pacífico, sus campañas.
- del Canto, Estanislao (1927). Memorias Militares. Imprenta La Tracción.
- Ejército de Chile. "Combate de la Concepción". Archived from the original on 2009-01-03.
- Mellafe, Rafael & Mauricio Pelayo (2004). La Guerra del Pacífico en imágenes, relatos, testimonios. Centro de Estudios Bicentenario.
- Ojeda, Jorge. "Second campaign to the Junin Department".
- Reyno, Manuel & Edmundo González (1985). La Historia del Ejército de Chile. Estado Mayor del Ejército de Chile.
