= Concepción Castañeda Ortiz =

Mexican politician

- Born: 8 December 1952 (age 73); Veracruz, Veracruz, Mexico
- Education: Universidad Veracruzana
- Occupation: Politician
- Political party: PRI

Concepción Oliva Castañeda Ortiz (born 8 December 1952) is a Mexican politician affiliated with the Institutional Revolutionary Party. In 2014 she served as Deputy of the LIX Legislature of the Mexican Congress as a plurinominal representative.
