= Concepción, Corrientes =

Concepción del Yaguareté Corá Kónsepsiõ (Guarani)
- Town
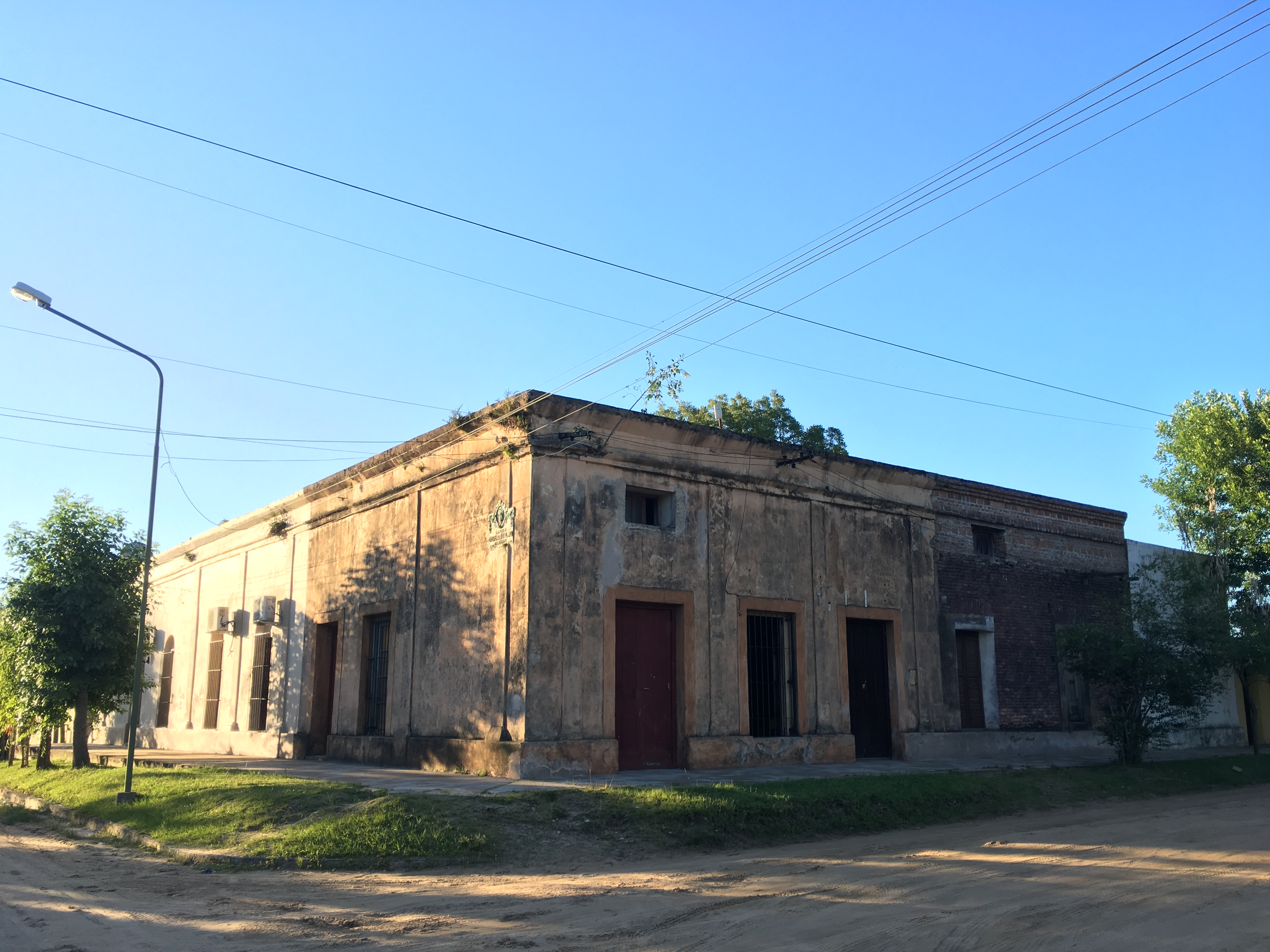
- Downtown

- Location of Concepción in Argentina
- Coordinates: 28°22′S 57°52′W
- Country: Argentina
- Province: Corrientes
- Department: Concepción
- Elevation: 51 m (167 ft)

Population
  - Total: 4,800
- Demonym: concepcionense
- Time zone: UTC−3 (ART)
- CPA base: W3423
- Dialing code: +54 3782

Concepción (Guarani: Kónsepsiõ; also known as Yaguareté Corá) is a town in Corrientes Province, Argentina.

It is the capital of Concepción Department.
