= Félix Alberto Beltrán Concepción =

Cuban artist (1937–2022)

Félix Juan Alberto Beltrán Concepción
- Born: 23 June 1938; Havana, Cuba
- Died: 28 December 2022 (aged 84); Mexico City

Félix Juan Alberto Beltrán Concepción (23 June 1938 – 28 December 2022) was a Cuban artist and one of the most important Latin American designers. He had a career as a graphic designer, painter, draftsman, and engraver.

== Biography ==
Beltrán studied in the United States between 1956 and 1962, studying Graphic Design at the School of Visual Arts, painting in the American Art School and lithography at the Pratt Graphic Art Center in New York City. He also studied at the New School for Social Research, where he met Adorno, Erich Fromm and Herbert Marcuse, amongst others.

Beltrán had a long professional experience because he worked on different publications and institutions. Between 1953 and 1956 he was a designer for Publicidad McCann Erickson Co. After 1959, his work was closely linked to the Cuban revolutionary process as part of the creative departments of various government institutions. In those early post-revolutionary years, he created some of his most important political posters and graphic images. Félix’s work is methodical and systematic, but it also stands out because he is capable of combining without complexes a colorful optimism coming from his Hispanic culture and the rationality and Modernist intellectuality discovered in New York and in his travels around Europe.

He was a juror in 1974 of VI Biennale des Arts Graphiques in Czechoslovakia and in 1976 of 6th International Poster Biennale in Zaçheta Gallerand, Warsaw, Poland. He also was a professor of Graphic Design in the Instituto Superior de Diseño Industrial (ISDI) (1980–1982), Instituto Superior de Arte (ISA) (1976–1982), in Havana, Cuba; at the Instituto de Estudios Superiores de Tamaulipas and the Universidad Iberoamericana in Mexico. From the middle of the 1980s he went into a self-exile and resided in Mexico City. In Mexico City, Beltrán developed an important academic and professional career in the field of corporate design. In 1988 he founded the Artis Gallery and then the first Latin American International Graphic Design Archive at the Universidad Autónoma Metropolitana where he was also a professor. A year later he founded the Codex Gallery of the National Institute of Fine Arts also in Mexico.

== Death ==
Beltrán died in Mexico City on 28 December 2022, at the age of 84.

== Individual exhibitions ==
Beltrán's personal exhibitions include: in 1971 "Símbolos de Félix Beltrán" in Museo Nacional de Bellas Artes de La Habana, Havana, Cuba; "Exhibition Hall Ruski Avenue", in Sofia, Bulgaria and after 1990 he did "Pinturas Deconstructivas de Félix Beltrán" in different galleries of Mexico City, like Gallery Frida Kahlo, Gallery Santos Balmori, Gallery Artis and Gallery Trazo.

Beltrán also took part in many collective exhibitions like one in 1960 at New Gallery, New York CityA.; in 1966 at the Gutenberg Museum, Frankfurt, Germany; International Trade Marks Exhibition, New York CityA. and in "Affiches Cubains" at the Musée d’Art et Industrie, Paris, France. Another exhibitions were in The Latin American Graphics Arts Biennial and Museum of Contemporary and Hispanic Art (MOCHA), New York City, in 1986. His work is also featured in the collection of the Center for the Study of Political Graphics.

In 2022, a career-inclusive exhibition, Félix Beltrán Visual Intelligence, was launched at the Complutense Art Centre in Madrid.

== Awards ==
During his life Beltrán obtained awards and recognitions like the Prize American Institute and Graphic Art in National Exhibition of Communication Arts, California, U.S.A. in 1962; Prize International cartels contest Moscow 88 Habana, Cuba; in 1981 was Honorary Member of Academia Mexicana de Diseño and Colegio de Diseñadores Industriales y Gráficos and International University Foundation, of Delaware.

== Collections ==
Beltrán's work can be found in permanent collections of:

- Art Center, Louisiana.
- Bibliothèque des Arts Decoratifs, Paris, France.
- Danish Museum of Decorative Art, Copenhagen, Denmark.
- Musée d’Art Moderne de la Ville de Paris, Paris, France.
- Musée des Arts Décoratifs, Lausanne, Switzerland.
- Museo de Arte Latinoamericano, Santiago de Chile, Chile.
- Museo Nacional de Bellas Artes de La Habana.
- Pushkin Museum, Moscow, Russia.
