= Concepción Blasco Oliver =

Spanish philanthropist, women rights activist

- Born: 1858; Castellón de la Plana
- Died: 1938|02|01; Castellón de la Plana
- Occupation: Philanthropist
- Board member of: Asociación Castellonense de Caridad
- Spouse: Leandro Alloza
- Children: 1

Concepción Blasco Oliver (Castellón de la Plana, 1858 - Ibidem, 1 February 1938) was a Spanish philanthropist, linked to the Asociación Castellonense de Caridad, the Junta de Tráfico de Blancas, and the Obra de Protección de Intereses Católicos (Castellón de la Plana).

== Biography ==
She was born in Castellón de la Plana and married in 1868 to Leandro Alloza, an engineer who designed and carried out the project for the port of Castellón. She had a daughter, Concepción Alloza, who followed in her footsteps in philanthropic work.

Concepción Blasco embodied the typical model of the angel of the home of the middle and upper classes, who devoted herself to the house and was also closely linked to the Church and charity work, precisely one of the spaces that allowed women to escape from the monotony of the home. In Castellón, at the end of the 19th century, there were different associations dedicated to charitable works in which women played a decisive role. Thus, they were active in the association of Conferencias de San Vicente de Paúl, as well as in the Ropero de la Caridad de la iglesia de San Agustín, founded in 1884, which that year brought together around 60 women who made clothes for the poor. In 1894, women were admitted for the first time to the Círculo Católico de Castellón as protective members, and a Patronato de niñas was created, run by women, which established a free school for poor girls; later, parish schools were also established.

In this beneficent environment, Concepción Blasco and many young women of Castellón not only devoted themselves to attending pious events or to assisting the needy, but also went out to listen to lectures and lyrical-musical evenings, to watch theatre, to read the newspaper. Gradually, as they frequented different places of sociability, they became familiar with public affairs and the events taking place around them, and this made their interest in social problems grow.

The philanthropy practised by different Catholic women was an experience that changed their perception of the world and their own identity. They usually started out in mixed charity and benefactors' associations, where they worked under male direction, but little by little they began to organise women's groups that they controlled and managed themselves. This is the case of Concepción Blasco, who held executive management positions in different associations, where she carried out very commendable work.

Her work as president of the Asociación Castellonense de Caridad stands out, where she carried out a very dynamic and continuous fund-raising activity for the needy classes. For example, in June 1921, 4,240 pesetas had been collected, which were not only destined for this association, but also for the Catholic women's trade unions and other secular and religious associations. The donations made by the upper classes of Castellón were published in the press with names and surnames in order to sacralise public charity.

Another management position she held was that of president of the Junta de Tráfico de Blancas in the 1920s. This institution sought to take in unmarried mothers, repentant prostitutes and even women accused of misconduct by their parents. They were usually admitted to the convent of the Oblate nuns in Benicasim. Although many of the members of this board were men who held public office, such as the mayor of Castellón, the director of the secondary school, health inspectors or a member of parliament, the women were directly in charge of its management. Concepción Blasco, as president, was supported very directly by Magdalena Grao and María Alegre, members like her of the association Obra de Protección de Intereses Católicos de Castellón.

== Bibliography ==
- Monlleó Peris, Rosa (2004). «Señoritas y obreras bajo la tutela de la Iglesia. Un estudio de la Asociación de mujeres Obra Protección de Intereses Católicos de Castellón (1921-1927)». Millars: Espai i història (Seminari d'Investigació Feminista i Universitat Jaume I) (27): 122-164. ISSN 1132-9823
- Monlleó Peris, Rosa (2007). «Cultura urbana femenina y espacios de ocio en Castellón a finales del siglo XIX». Dossiers Feministes (Seminari d'Investigació Feminista i Universitat Jaume I) (10): 121-155. ISSN 1139-1219
- Monlleó Peris, Rosa (2003). «Educación y moral de clases. Los espacios de la sociabilidad de la mujer en Castellón durante el período restauracionista». Asparkía. Investigación feminista (Universitat Jaume I) (14): 115-137. ISSN 1132-8231
- Tolmos Hernández, Alba Gema (2018). La reeducación femenina durante el franquismo. El Patronato de Protección a la Mujer en la Provincia de Sevilla (1902-1952). Trabajo Fin de Grado. Sevilla: Universidad de Sevilla.
