= Concepción Robles Altamirano =

Mexican politician

- Born: 15 May 1965 (age 61); Tlacolula de Matamoros, Oaxaca, Mexico
- Occupation: Politician
- Political party: PRI

Concepción Sofía Robles Altamirano (born 15 May 1965) is a Mexican politician affiliated with the Institutional Revolutionary Party. As of 2014 she served as Deputy of the LIX Legislature of the Mexican Congress representing Oaxaca as replacement of Jacobo Sánchez López.
