= Concepción Silva Belinzon =

Uruguayan writer

Concepción Silva Belinzon was an Uruguayan writer, she was born in Montevideo in 1903 and died on November 2, 1987. She was characterized primarily by writing volumes of poetry. In her sonnets she wrote both, as in Sapphic ode and lira, making an abusive use of rhyme. She began publishing in the early 1940s, and her first book was "The return of the Samaritan woman." She was religious in nature.
