= Concepción Saiz Otero =

Spanish teacher, pedagogue, feminist, and writer

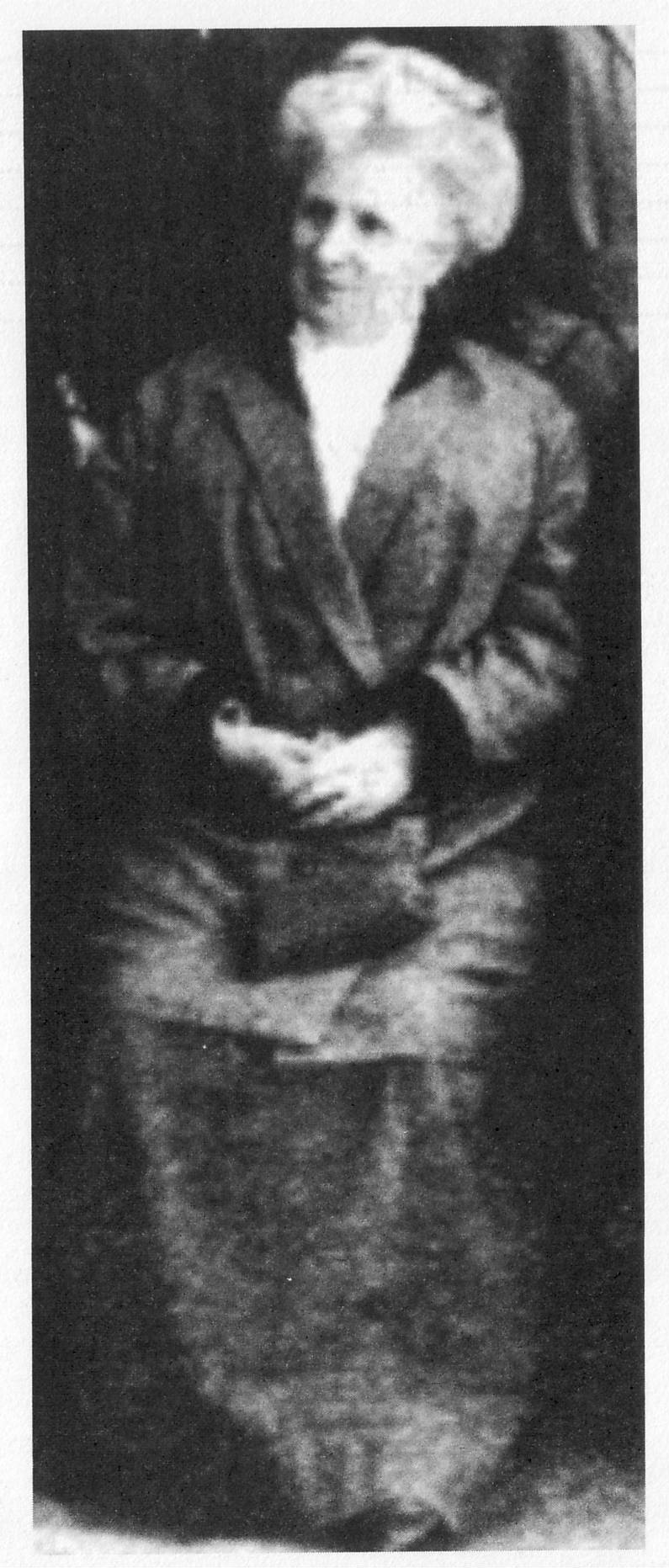
Concepción Saiz Otero - 1917

Concepción Saiz Otero (May 22, 1851 – March 1934) was a Spanish teacher, pedagogue, feminist, and writer who advocated for women in education.

After being awarded the title of Superior Teacher in 1878, she directed the first graduate school for women within the Association for the Teaching of Women from 1881 to 1884. Otero was a teacher at the Central Normal School for Teachers in Madrid from 1884 until her retirement in 1921.

She spoke at the 1882 and 1892 Pedagogical Congresses in Madrid. In 1909, she was appointed Chair of Languages at the newly created School of Higher Education Teaching.

In addition to teaching, Otero was a prolific writer who published several books and numerous articles, often discussing teaching and the role of women's education.

She collaborated with Urbano González Serrano in 1895 on Letters...Pedagogical? Essay of Pedagogical Psychology, which critiqued the traditional model of education based on rote exercises. Though her pedagogically focused books were well-respected, Otero's most known work is A National Episode Pérez Galdos Did Not Write: The 1868 Revolution and Feminine Culture, which describes the changing educational landscape for women in Spain from a woman's perspective and provides a detailed account of her own career in education and the challenges she faced as a woman in the field.

In 1921, she was awarded the Cross of Alfonso XII, and there is a street named in her honor in Zaragoza.
