= Concepción Leyes de Chaves =

Paraguayan writer, playwright and journalist

- Born: María Concepción Leyes; April 26, 1891; Caazapá, Paraguay
- Died: 1985 (aged 93–94); Asunción, Paraguay
- Occupations: writer, journalist, lecturer
- Spouse: Manuel W. Chaves
- Children: Ana Iris Chaves de Ferreiro
- Writing career
- Notable awards: Officer of the National Order of Merit of France (1965), National Order of Merit of the Republic of Haiti

María Concepción Leyes de Chaves (26 April 1891, Caazapá, Paraguay – 1985, Asunción, Paraguay) was a Paraguayan writer, playwright, journalist and lecturer.

== Life ==
María Conceptión Leyes de Chaves was born on 26 April 1891 in Caazapá, Paraguay. She was a daughter of Francisco Leyes and Benita Espínola. Leyes worked as a teacher in Ayolas and from young age collaborated with Paraguayan newspapers and magazines.

Leyes was married to teacher, journalist and member of a parliament Manuel W. Chaves, with whom she had six children. She is a mother of a writer and journalist Ana Iris Chaves de Ferreiro.

== Career ==
She was a recognized lecturer having given 30 conferences on various topics from 1936 to 1975. Leyes became well-known in Paraguay when her books Amanecer, Caminito, Nave, Alegria, Patria mía and Cumbre were approved to be used in primary schools of the republic. In 1941, Leyes won the First Prize in the Contest of novel of the Paraguayan Athenaeum for a novel Tava-í. In 1944, she received the first prize in the novel contest in Brazil. In 1951, Leyes published a book Río lunado – Myths and legends of Paraguay, and in 1957 – Madame Lynch – a fictionalized biography of a companion of a Paraguayan hero Marshal Francisco Solano López.

From 1953 to 1957 Leyes was a President of the Inter-American Commission of Women based in Washington, DC. In 1955, during the Tenth Inter-American Conference in Caracas, she obtained recognition of the legal rights of women in America, and the same year she was named one of four most outstanding women of the year by the Organization of American States (OAS) in Washington.

In 1955, Leyes also was awarded the National Order of Merit of the Republic of Haiti and received golden keys from Port-au-Prince (Haiti), Santo Domingo (Dominican Republic) and San Juan (Puerto Rico). Her further awards included the Medal of Honor of the Female Institute of Caracas (1958), the rank of Officer of the National Order of Merit of France (1965) and the Rondon National Medal of Merit of the Brazil (1969).

In Asunción Leyes occupied positions of President of the UNESCO Seminar on Museology and President of the Commission of Museums and National Monuments of Paraguay in 1958, President of the French Alliance in 1965, Director of the Yearbook of the Paraguayan Academy of History in 1976, and Emeritus Advisor to the Inter-American Commission of Women in 1980.

Leyes’ works were published in magazines in the United States such as Ride With The Sun and United Nation Women's Guide, and they also appeared in the Spanish-American anthology América habla (Buenos Aires, 1976) and in the Historia de la literature iberoamericana, published in Madrid in 1982.

Conceptión Leyes de Chaves died in Asunción in 1985.

A street in Asunción is named in her honor.

== Works ==
- “Tava’i” (1942)
- “Río Lunado - Mitos y leyendas del Paraguay” (1951)
- “Madame Lynch” (1957)
- “Hechizos de Guarania”
- “Romance de la Niña Francia”.
