= Concepción Langa Nuño =

Concepción Langa Nuño was born in Seville, Spain. She is a historian specializing in art history, media history and the Spanish Civil War and is a member of the faculty of Geography and History at the University of Seville.
