= Concepción Ojeda Hernández =

Mexican politician

- Born: 14 May 1977 (age 49); Michoacán, Mexico
- Occupation: Politician
- Political party: PRD

Concepción Ojeda Hernández (born 14 May 1977) is a Mexican politician from the Party of the Democratic Revolution. From 2006 to 2009 she served as Deputy of the LX Legislature of the Mexican Congress representing Michoacán.
