= Juan Gastó =

Peruvian Army colonel (1824–1883)

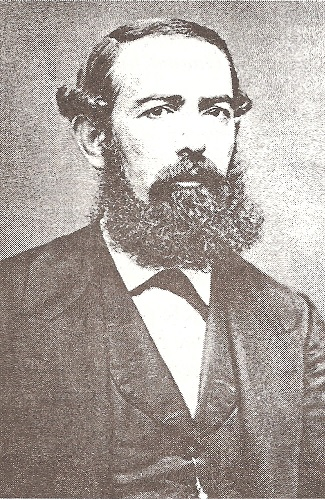
- Born: May 6, 1824; Moquegua, Peru
- Died: July 10, 1883 (aged 59); Huamachuco, Peru
- Military career
- Allegiance: Peru
- Branch: Peruvian Army
- Service years: 1843 – 1883
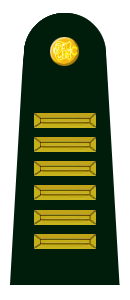
- Rank: Colonel
- Conflicts: War of the Pacific: Lima campaign; Battle of San Juan and Chorrillos; Battle of Miraflores; Sierra Campaign; Battle of La Concepción; Battle of Huamachuco †

Juan Gastó Valderrama (May 6, 1824 - July 10, 1883) was a Peruvian colonel who participated prominently in the Sierra Campaign of the War of the Pacific and was in the Peruvian army for forty years. During his military service, he was the main commander of the Peruvian victories at the Battle of La Concepción and the Battle of Tarmatambo. He participated at the Battle of Huamachuco as head of the 2nd division of the Army of the Center where he was killed in action at the age of 59.

== Early years ==
He was born in Moquegua in the home formed by Miguel Gasteau of French descent, and Tomasa Valderrama. He studied at the "La Libertad" national school, graduating in 1843 and became a cadet in the army organized by Marshal Domingo Nieto of Moquegua. He then sided with Ramón Castilla to oppose the dictatorial government of Manuel Ignacio de Vivanco. After the Battle of San Antonio in December 1843, he was promoted to second lieutenant and after successive acts of arms, he was promoted to lieutenant.

When, in 1854, Marshal Castilla's revolution against President José Rufino Echenique began, he held the rank of captain, participating in the battle of La Palma and rising to sergeant major during the campaign.

In 1860 he served as consul of Peru in the Brazilian state of Pará, later moving to the Moyobamba Province where he was entrusted with the compilation of colonial documents that accredited the rights of Peru over Amazonian territories claimed by Ecuador, a task that he carried out efficiently, leading the original documents to Lima to be delivered to President Ramón Castilla.

In 1864 he supported the constitutional government of President Juan Antonio Pezet and he marched to fight the Arequipa revolution led by General Mariano Ignacio Prado, occupying Arica but Lima was captured by the revolutionaries and overthrowing the Pezet administration and Gastó accepted the new authorities, participating in 1867 of the frustrated siege and attack on the city of Misti.

He returned to active service during the government of Manuel Pardo, taking part in the repressive campaign against the revolutionaries of Nicolás de Piérola, who were defeated and dispersed in the Cuesta de los Ángeles (near Moquegua), after this campaign he was appointed prefect of Puno, also holding the same position in Cusco and Ayacucho in 1878.

== War of the Pacific ==
During the War of the Pacific, he participated in the Lima campaign, attending the Battle of San Juan and Chorrillos and the Battle of Miraflores, in the latter he fought in the artillery that defended redoubt No. 5. After the defeat, he marched to the mountains trying to find Nicolás de Piérola. After returning to Lima in disguise to settle personal matters, he went back to the Andes Mountains to join the Sierra campaign led by General Andrés Cáceres, whom he represented as a special envoy to the Arequipa government, which was then chaired by Colonel La Torre, reintegrated into the resistance army and then took part in the 1882 counteroffensive against the forces of Chilean Colonel Estanislao del Canto. He then participated in the First Battle of Pucará, the Second Battle of Pucará and Battle of La Concepción, where he commanded the regular forces that, together with the guerrillas of Ambrosio Salazar, attacked the plaza in which the fourth company of the Chacabuco battalion was exterminated. He continued the campaign until the withdrawal of the occupying Chilean forces and the following year he made the march north that would culminate in the disastrous defeat at the Battle of Huamachuco in which he met his death.

On July 9, 1883, he had written a letter to his relatives where he stated that:

I am sure that I will fall in some combat with the enemy, because I am resolved to die in defense of my country.
