= Concepción District, Concepción =

Concepción
- District
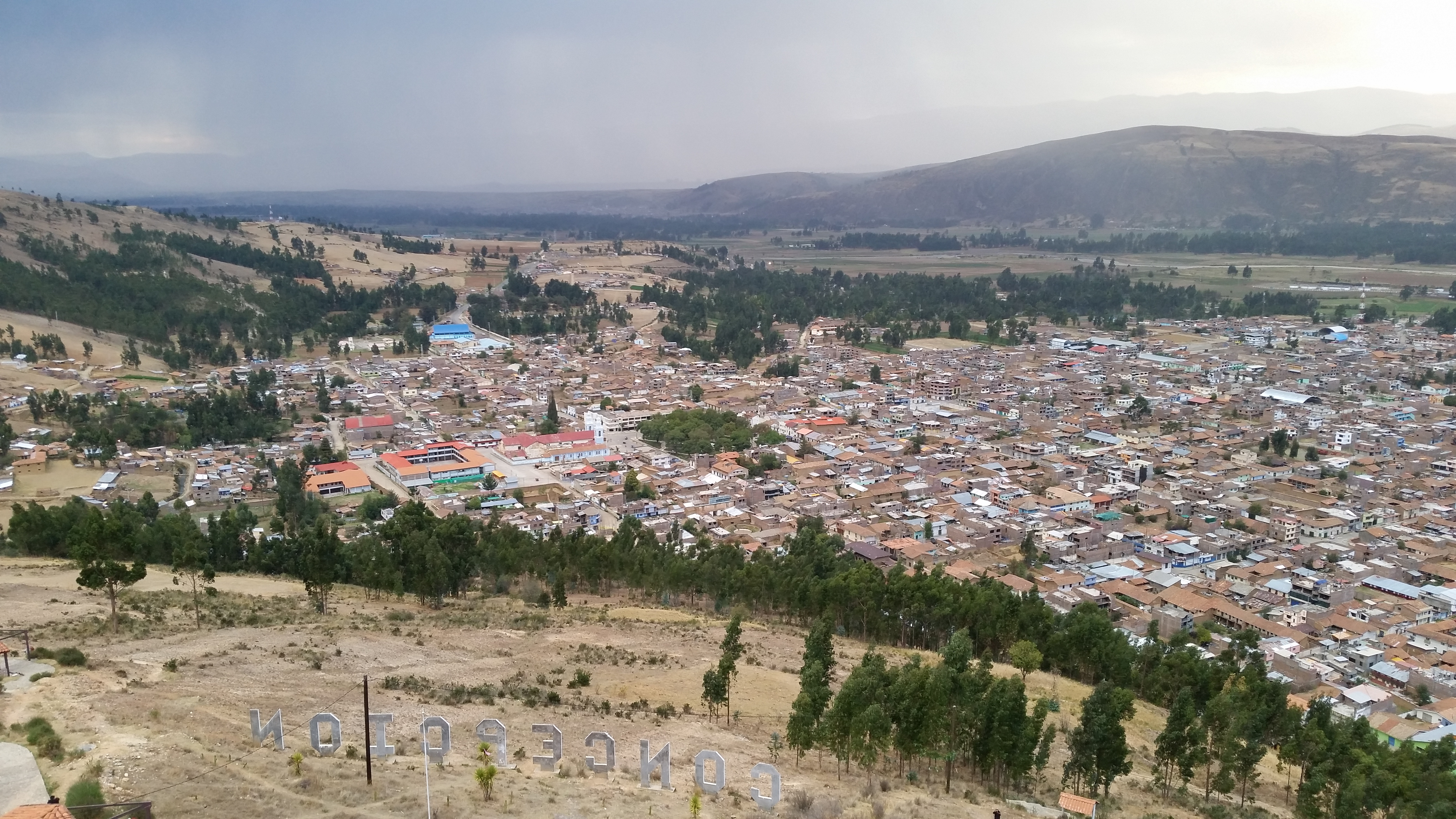
- Interactive map of Concepción
- Country: Peru
- Region: Junín
- Province: Concepción
- Founded: January 2, 1857
- Capital: Concepción

Government
  - Mayor: Benjamín Próspero De la Cruz Palomino (2019-2022)

Area
  - Total: 18.29 km^{2} (7.06 sq mi)
- Elevation: 3,283 m (10,771 ft)

Population (2017)
  - Total: 15,428
  - Density: 843.5/km^{2} (2,185/sq mi)
- Time zone: UTC-5 (PET)
- UBIGEO: 120201

Concepción District is one of fifteen districts of the province Concepción in Peru.
