= Tomas Fernandez Concepcion =

Filipino politician (1935–2012)

Tomas Fernandez Concepcion (November 4, 1935 - May 30, 2012) was a Congressman in the Philippines House of Representatives and an artist best known for his sculptures of Filipino Senator Benigno Aquino, revolutionary Jose Rizal, and Pope John Paul II.

During the People Power Revolution of the 1980s, Concepcion joined “Movement for a Free Philippines,” serving as point person for the organization's branch in Italy, where he lived to work on his art. His most famous works have been sculptures of celebrated men, including one of Aquino, in People's Park in Manila; Rizal, in Rome; John Paul II, in Guam; and Pope Paul VI, in the Vatican. According to House Resolution no. 2495, introduced in his memory on June 7, 2012, Concepcion "was a highly regarded artist ... with a socially conscious heart." In 1992, Concepcion was appointed to the House of Representatives, where he served for four years as Representative of the Labor Sector for the 9th Congress of the Philippines. From that position, he defended the rights of overseas Filipino laborers. He later moved back to Italy, where he spent the rest of his life working on his artwork, including a bronze bust of U.S. President Barack Obama, which Concepcion had hoped to present to the White House.
