= Purísima =

Coordinates: 9°14′N 75°44′W

- Municipality and town
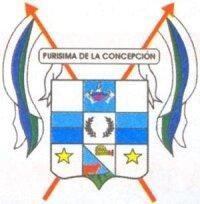
- Flag Coat of arms

- Location of the municipality and town of Purísima in the Córdoba Department of Colombia.
- Country: Colombia
- Department: Córdoba Department

Area
  - Total: 122 km^{2} (47 sq mi)

Population (Census 2018)
  - Total: 14,705
  - Density: 121/km^{2} (312/sq mi)
- Time zone: UTC-5 (Colombia Standard Time)

Purísima is a town and municipality located in the Córdoba Department, northern Colombia.

According to 2018 estimates, the population of Purísima was 14,705, with a population density of 120 persons per square kilometer.
