= Concepción Department, Argentina =

Concepción Department Departamento Concepción (Spanish) Tetãvore Kónsepsiõ (Guarani)
- Department
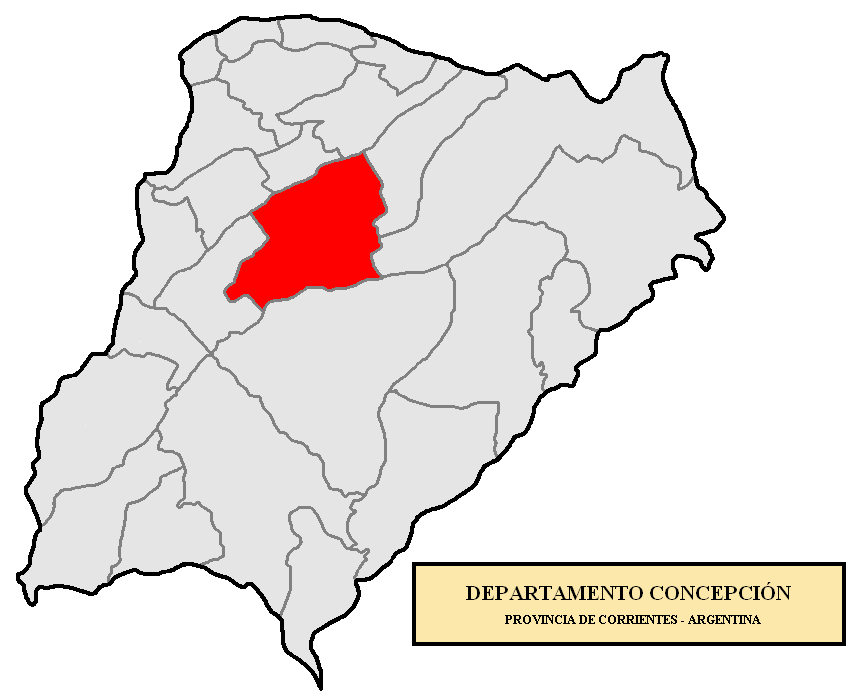
- location of Concepción Department in Corrientes Province
- Coordinates: 28°22′S 57°52′W
- Country: Argentina
- Seat: Concepción

Area
  - Total: 5,124 km^{2} (1,978 sq mi)

Population (2010 census [INDEC])
  - Total: 21,113
  - Density: 4.120/km^{2} (10.67/sq mi)
- Demonym: concepcionsense
- Postal Code: W3423
- Area Code: 03782

Concepción Department is a department of Corrientes Province in Argentina.

The provincial subdivision has a population of about 21,113 inhabitants in an area of 5,124 km^{2} (1,978 sq mi), and its capital city is Concepción.

== Settlements ==
- Colonia Santa Rosa
- Concepción
- Tabay
- Tatacuá

== See also ==
- Concepción Department (Paraguay)
