= Concepción, Junín =

Concepción
- Town
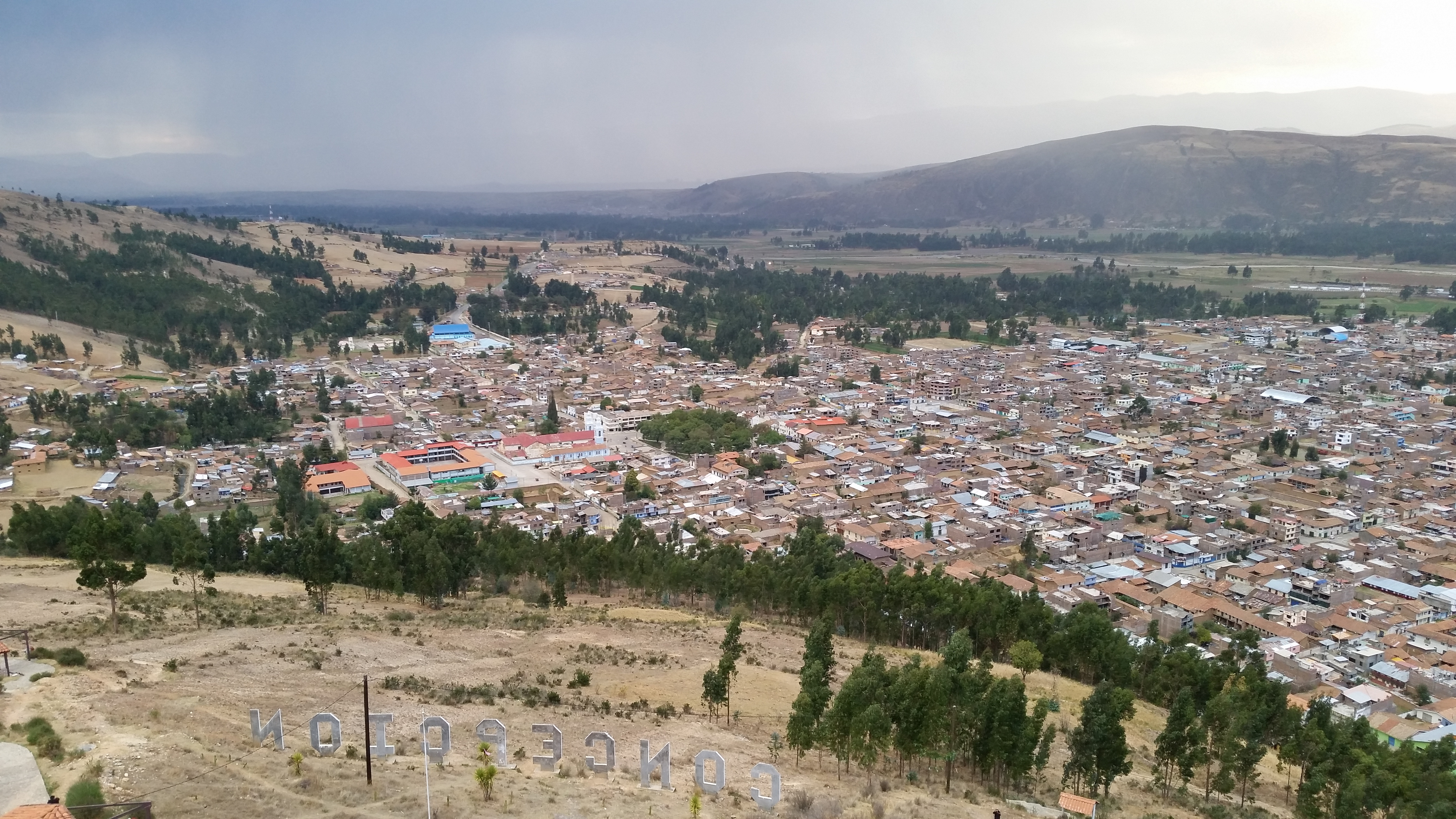
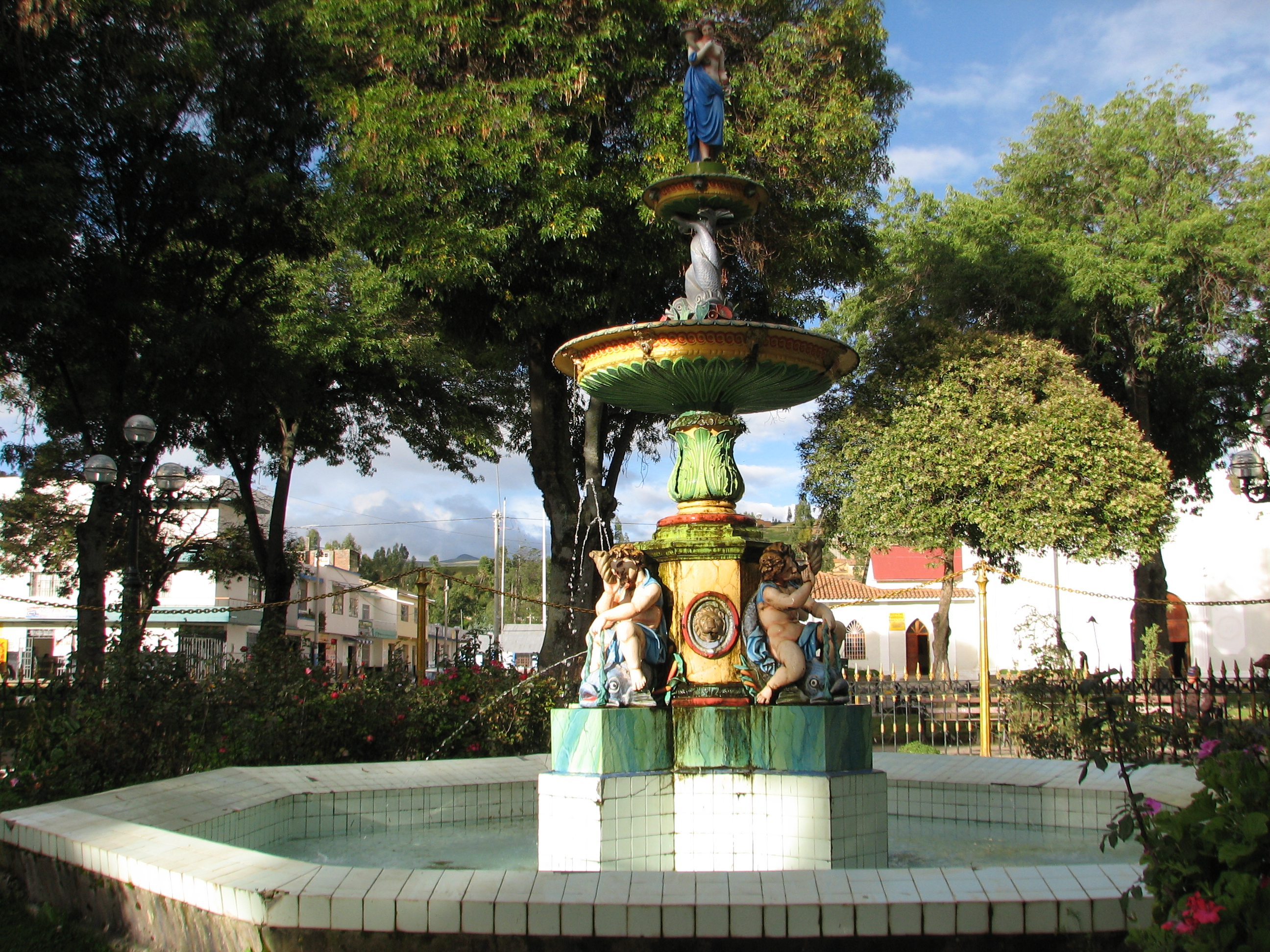
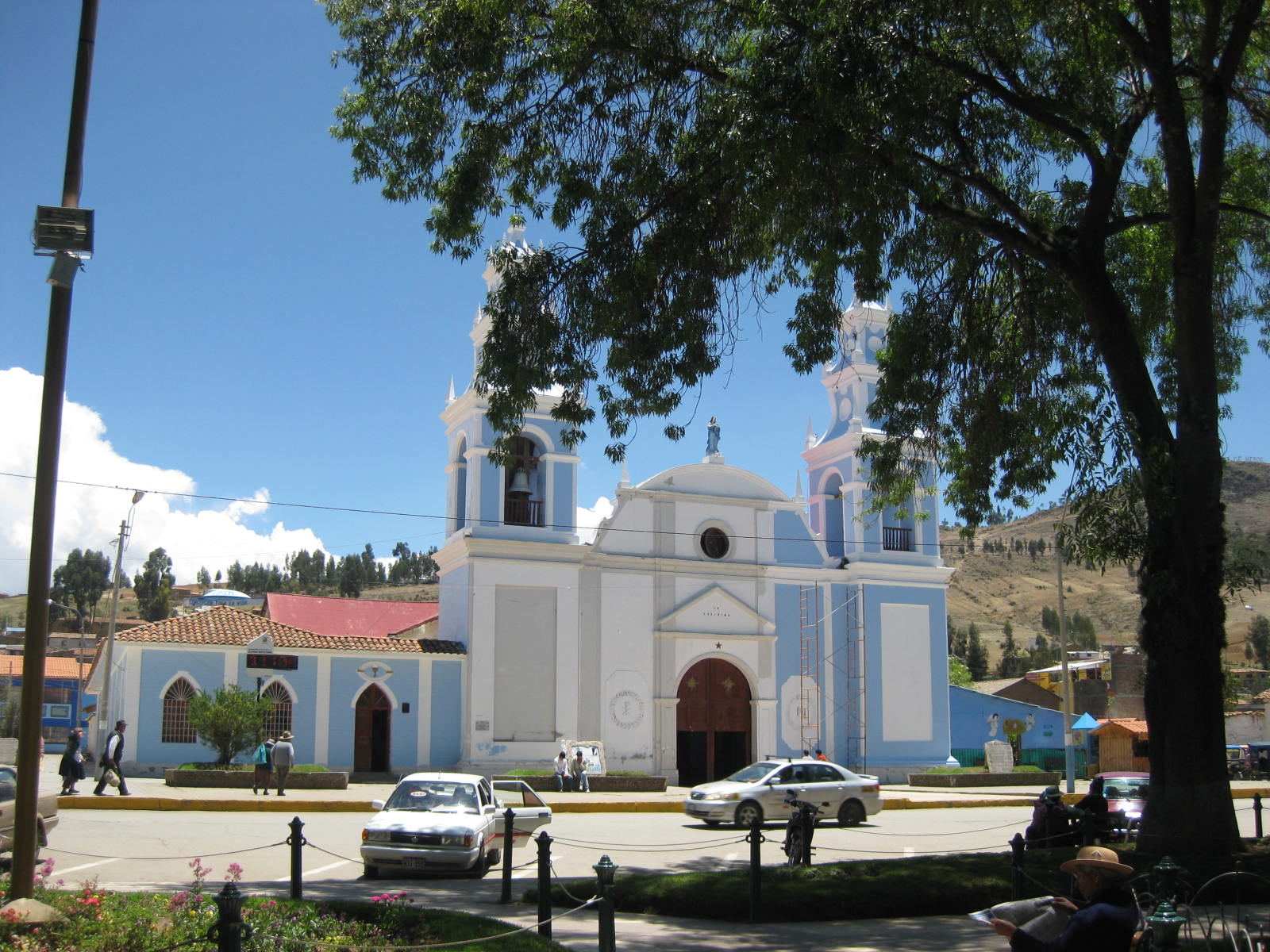
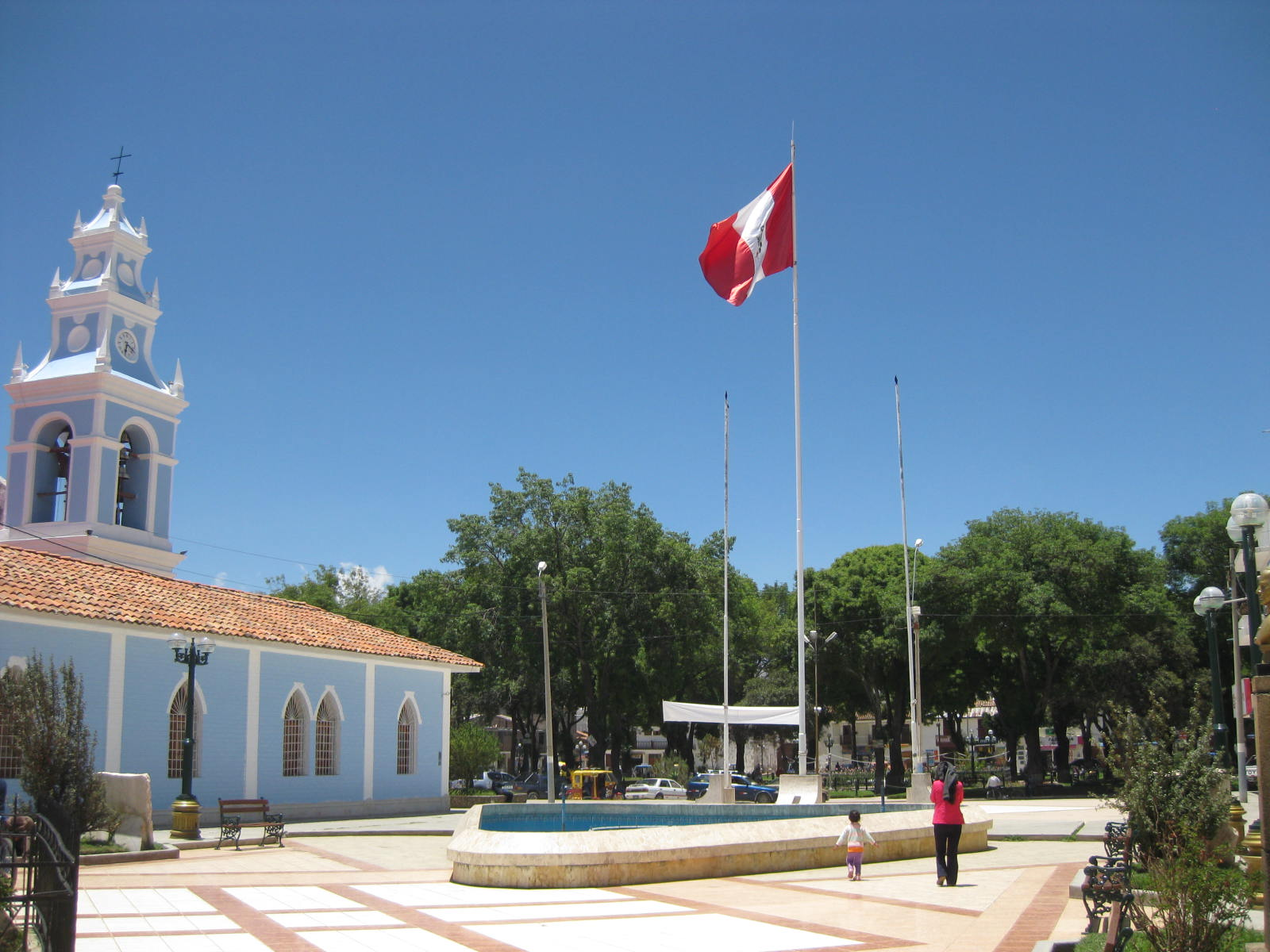
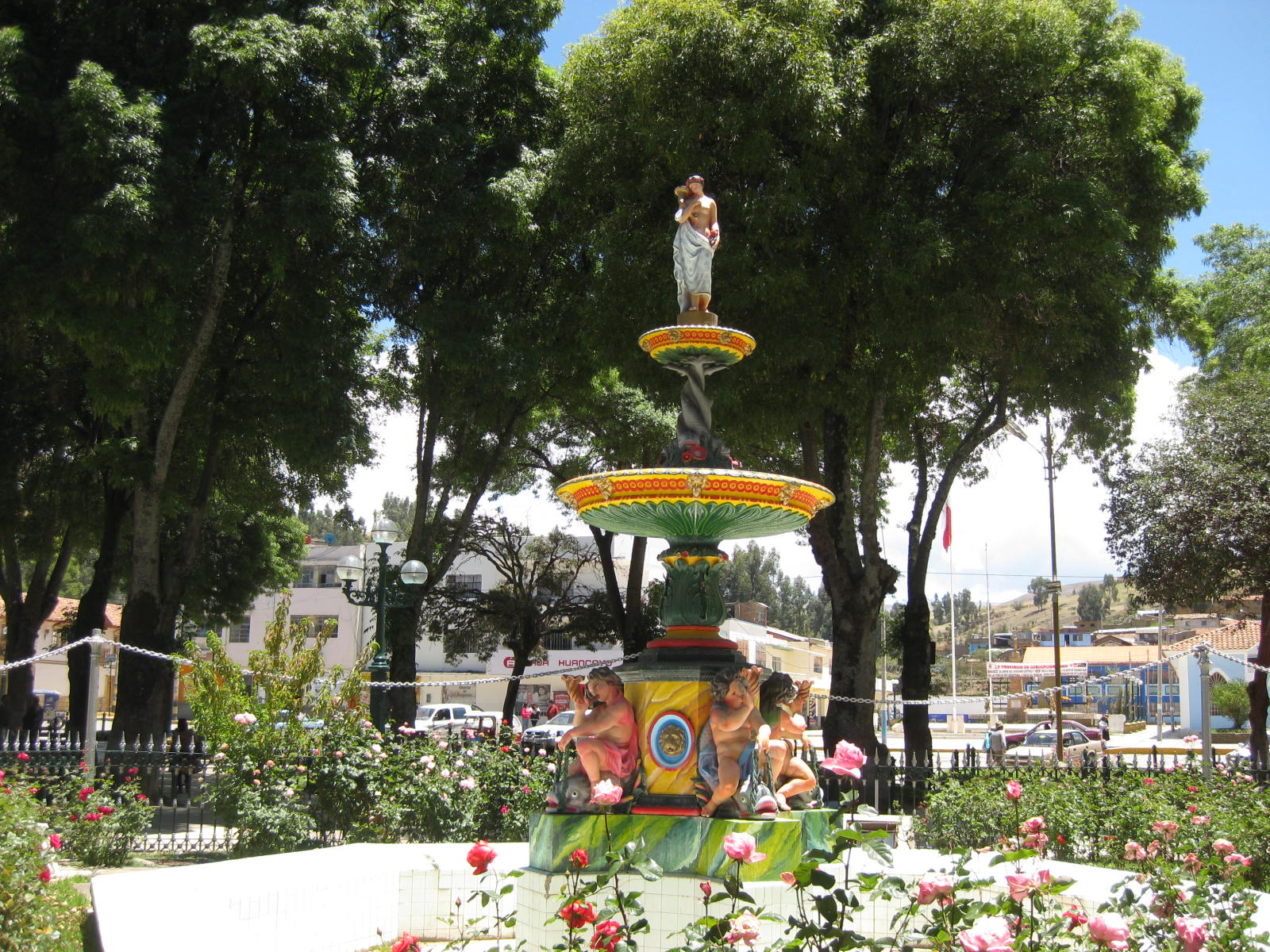
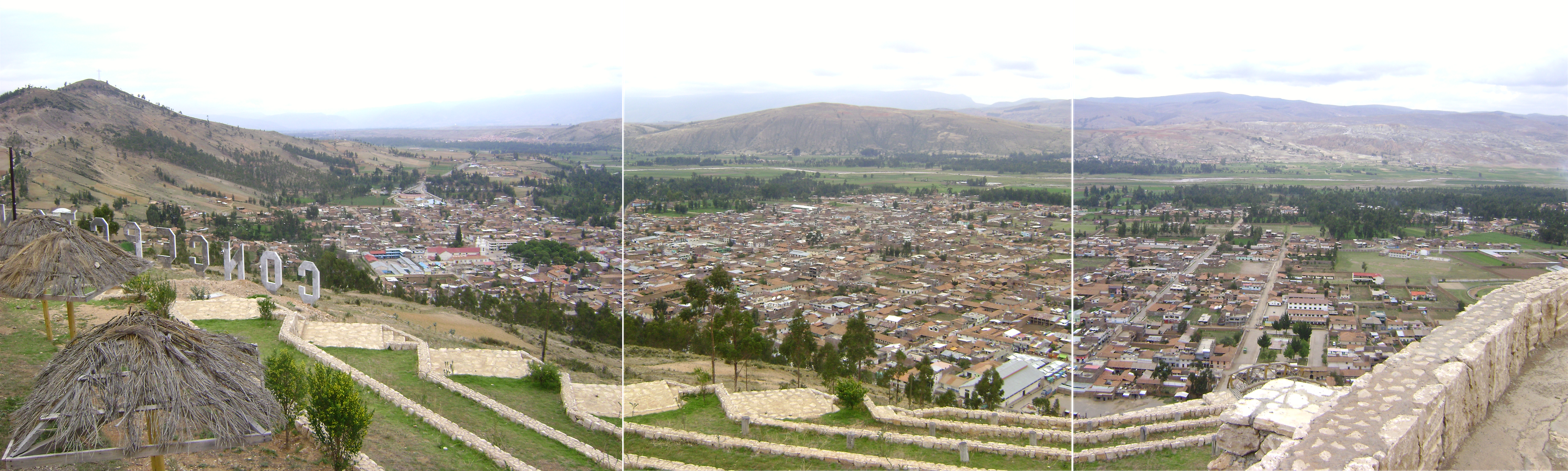
- Photo montage of Concepción

- Location within Peru
- Coordinates: 11°55′06.52″S 75°18′46.40″W
- Country: Peru
- Region: Junín
- Province: Concepción
- District: Concepción
- Founded: 8 December 1537

Government
  - Mayor: Benjamín Próspero De la Cruz Palomino (2019-2022)
- Elevation: 3,283 m (10,771 ft)

Population (2017)
  - Total: 15,428
- Demonym: concepcionino/a
- Time zone: UTC-5 (PET)
- Website: www.municoncepcion.gob.pe

Concepción is a town in central Peru, capital of the province Concepción in the region Junín. During the War of the Pacific in July 1882, Concepción was the location of the Battle of La Concepción, in which a force of 77 Chilean soldiers fought to the last man against 1,300 Peruvian soldiers and guerillas.
