= Breña campaign =

Final military campaign of the War of the Pacific

- Part of War of the Pacific
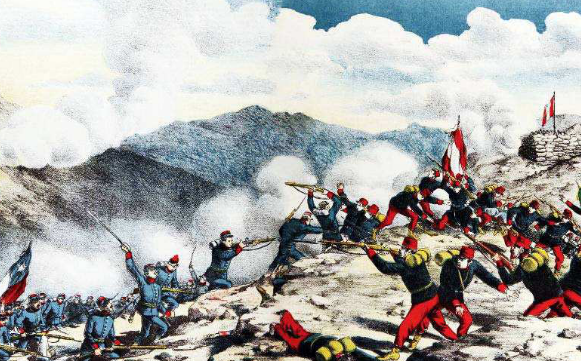
- Painting of a battle by Luis Fernando Rojas
Date	February 1881 – November 1883
Location	Sierra (Andean region), Peru
Result	Chilean victory: Peace conditions favorable to the Chilean government are created.; Establishment of the government of Miguel Iglesias.; Isolation of Cáceres resistance and decline of other guerrilla leaders.

Belligerents
Chile (Peru) Government of La Magdalena (until 1881) (Peru) Government of Iglesias (since 1883)	(Peru) Peruvian resistance: Cáceres Army; Army of the Center; Arequipa Army

Commanders and leaders
(Chile) Patricio Lynch (Peru) Francisco García Calderón (until 1881) (Peru) Miguel Iglesias (since 1883)	(Peru) Andrés Avelino Cáceres (Peru) Nicolás de Piérola (Peru) Francisco García Calderón (POW) (Peru) Miguel Iglesias (until 1882) Other minor leaders

Strength
est. 3,000-17,000	5,000 regular from Arequipa; 3,000 regular and irregular troops 3,000 montoneras

Casualties and losses
6,090 casualties (until July 1, 1883)	5,000 casualties

The Breña campaign, or Sierra campaign, was the last phase of the land campaigns of the War of the Pacific. This stage begins after the occupation of Lima, in February 1881, and extends until the consolidation of the Treaty of Ancón, between October and November 1883, which ends the war, with favorable conditions for Chile.

== See also ==
- Asymmetric warfare

== Bibliography ==
- Basadre, Jorge (1964). Historia de la Republica del Peru, La guerra con Chile (in Spanish). Lima, Peru: Peruamerica S.A. Archived from the original on December 11, 2007.
- Villalobos, Sergio (2004). Chile y Perú, la historia que nos une y nos separa, 1535–1883 (in Spanish) (2 ed.). Chile: Editorial Universitaria. ISBN 9789561116016.
- Sater, William F. (2007). Andean Tragedy: Fighting the War of the Pacific, 1879–1884. Lincoln and London: University of Nebraska Press. ISBN 978-0-8032-4334-7.
- Bulnes, Gonzalo (1919). Guerra del Pacífico. Ocupación del Perú - La Paz (PDF). Vol. III. Valparaíso, Chile: Sociedad Imprenta y Litografía Universo.
