= Church of the Immaculate Conception =

Church of the Immaculate Conception, Immaculate Conception Church, Church of Our Lady of Immaculate Conception or Our Lady of Immaculate Conception Church may refer to:

== Azerbaijan ==
- Church of the Immaculate Conception, Baku

== Bosnia and Herzegovina ==
- Immaculate Conception Church (Vidoši), Livno

== Brunei ==
- Church of Our Lady of Immaculate Conception, Seria

== Canada ==
- Immaculate Conception Church (Palmer Road), Prince Edward Island
- Immaculate Conception Church (Peterborough, Ontario)
- Church of the Immaculate Conception (Cooks Creek, Manitoba)

== China ==
- Cathedral of the Immaculate Conception, Beijing
- Cathedral of the Immaculate Conception (Changsha)
- Cathedral of the Immaculate Conception (Hangzhou)
- Church of the Immaculate Conception, Huzhuang, Pingyin County, Jinan, Shandong province
- Church of the Immaculate Conception, Jinan
- Cathedral of the Immaculate Conception (Nanjing)

== Croatia ==
- Immaculate Conception Church (Vidoši)

== Estonia ==
- Immaculate Conception Church, Tartu

== Germany ==
- Maria, Königin des Friedens, Neviges

== Hong Kong ==
- Cathedral of the Immaculate Conception (Hong Kong)

== India ==
- Church of Immaculate Conception, Gurgaon, Haryana
- Our Lady of the Immaculate Conception Church, Goa, Panaji, Goa
- Our Lady of Immaculate Conception Church, Manjummel, Kochi, Kerala
- Our Lady of Immaculate Conception Church, Mt. Poinsur, Borivali, Maharashtra
- Immaculate Conception Church, Urwa, Mangalore
- Our Lady of Immaculate Conception Church, Chrishthupalayam, Krishnagiri. Tamil Nadu

== Ireland ==
- Church of the Immaculate Conception, Dublin
- Church of the Immaculate Conception, Tallow

== Italy ==
- Church of the Immaculate Conception, Riccia

== Malaysia ==
- Church of the Immaculate Conception (Johor)
- Church of the Immaculate Conception, Penang

== Malta ==
- Collegiate Church of the Immaculate Conception, Bormla
- Church of the Immaculate Conception, or Sarria Church, Floriana
- Parish Church of the Immaculate Conception, Ħamrun
- Chapel of the Immaculate Conception, Bengħisa
- Chapel of the Immaculate Conception, St. Julian's
- Chapel of the Immaculate Conception, Wied Gerżuma
- Church of the Immaculate Conception, Żurrieq

== Morocco ==
- Church of the Immaculate Conception (Tangier)

== Philippines ==
- The Immaculate Conception of the Virgin Mary Parish Church, or Baclayon Church, Baclayon, Bohol
- Minor Basilica of the Immaculate Conception (Batangas City), Batangas
- Immaculate Conception Parish Church (Balayan), Batangas
- Immaculate Conception Parish Church (Concepcion), Tarlac
- Immaculate Conception Parish Church (Dasmariñas), Cavite
- Immaculate Conception Church (Guagua), Pampanga
- Immaculate Conception Parish Church (Jasaan), Misamis Oriental
- Immaculate Conception Parish Church (Los Baños), Laguna
- Immaculate Conception Parish Church (Santa Cruz), Laguna
- Immaculate Conception Parish Church (Santa Maria), Bulacan
- Immaculate Conception Parish Church (Guiuan), Eastern Samar

== Portugal ==
- Our Lady of Conception Parish Church, or Matriz Church of Póvoa de Varzim, Póvoa de Varzim
- Church of Our Lady of the Conception, or Church of Nossa Senhora da Conceição Velha, Lisbon
- Church of Our Lady of Conception, or Our Lady of the Assumption Cathedral, Santarém

== Russia ==
- Immaculate Conception Church, Perm
- Immaculate Conception Church, Smolensk

== Spain ==
- Church of the Immaculate Conception, La Línea de la Concepción

== Syria ==
- Church of the Immaculate Conception, Al-Yaqoubiah

== Thailand ==
- Immaculate Conception Church, Bangkok

== United Kingdom ==
- Church of the Immaculate Conception, Spinkhill, Derbyshire
- Church of the Immaculate Conception, Hartlepool, County Durham
- Church of the Immaculate Conception, Farm Street, London, England
- Church of the Immaculate Conception, Scarthingwell, North Yorkshire
- Church of Our Lady of the Immaculate Conception, Birkenhead, Merseyside
- Our Lady Immaculate Church, Chelmsford, Essex
- Immaculate Conception Church, Clevedon, Somerset
- Immaculate Conception Parish Church, Stratherrick, Inverness-Shire, Scotland
- Chapel of the Immaculate Conception, Franciscan Convent, Bocking, Essex

== United States ==
=== Alaska ===
- Immaculate Conception Church (Fairbanks, Alaska)

=== Connecticut ===
- Immaculate Conception Parish (Connecticut)
- Immaculate Conception Parish, Southington

=== District of Columbia ===
- Immaculate Conception Church (Washington, D.C.)

=== Florida ===
- Immaculate Conception Church (Jacksonville, Florida)

=== Georgia ===
- Shrine of the Immaculate Conception, Atlanta

=== Hawaii ===
- Immaculate Conception Catholic Church (Lihue, Hawaii)

=== Illinois ===
- Church of the Immaculate Conception (Chicago)

=== Indiana ===
- Church of the Immaculate Conception (Saint Mary-of-the-Woods, Indiana)

=== Kentucky ===
- Immaculate Conception Catholic Church (Peach Grove, Kentucky)
- Immaculate Conception Church (Hawesville, Kentucky)

=== Louisiana ===
- Immaculate Conception Church (New Orleans)

=== Massachusetts ===
- Immaculate Conception Parish, Indian Orchard
- Immaculate Conception Parish, Springfield

=== Michigan ===
- Immaculate Conception Church (Iron Mountain, Michigan)

=== Minnesota ===
- Church of the Immaculate Conception (St. Anna, Minnesota)

=== Missouri ===
- Immaculate Conception Church and Rectory (St. Louis)

=== Nebraska ===
- Immaculate Conception Church and School (Omaha, Nebraska)

=== Nevada ===
- Immaculate Conception Church (Sparks, Nevada)

=== New Jersey ===
- Church of the Immaculate Conception (Camden, New Jersey)

=== North Carolina ===
- Immaculate Conception Catholic Church (Durham, North Carolina)
- Church of the Immaculate Conception (Halifax, North Carolina)

=== New York ===
- Immaculate Conception Church (Amenia, New York)
- Immaculate Conception Church (Bangall, New York)
- Immaculate Conception Church (Bronx)
- Immaculate Conception Church (Manhattan)
- Church of the Immaculate Conception and Clergy Houses, Manhattan
- Immaculate Conception Church (Rochester, New York)
- Church of the Immaculate Conception (Tuckahoe, New York)
- Church of the Immaculate Conception (Yonkers)

=== Ohio ===
- Immaculate Conception Catholic Church (Botkins, Ohio)
- Immaculate Conception Catholic Church (Celina, Ohio)
- Immaculate Conception Church, School, and Rectory, Cincinnati
- Immaculate Conception Catholic Church (Fulda, Ohio)
- Immaculate Conception Church (Grafton, Ohio)

=== Oklahoma ===
- Immaculate Conception Church (Pawhuska, Oklahoma)

=== Rhode Island ===
- Former Immaculate Conception Church, Westerly

=== South Dakota ===
- Church of the Immaculate Conception (Rapid City, South Dakota)

=== Tennessee ===
- Church of the Immaculate Conception (Knoxville, Tennessee)

=== Texas ===
- Immaculate Conception Church (Brownsville, Texas)

=== Washington ===
- Steilacoom Catholic Church, a.k.a. Church of the Immaculate Conception, Steilacoom

== Uruguay ==
- Church of the Immaculate Conception, or Iglesia de la Inmaculada Concepción, Rivera

== See also ==
- Basilica of the Immaculate Conception (disambiguation)
- Cathedral of the Immaculate Conception (disambiguation)
- Church of the Immaculate Conception of the Blessed Virgin Mary (disambiguation)
- Church of Our Lady Immaculate (disambiguation)
- St. Mary of the Immaculate Conception Church (disambiguation)
- Immaculate Conception (disambiguation)
