= Church of the Immaculate Conception of the Blessed Virgin Mary =

The Church of the Immaculate Conception of the Blessed Virgin Mary may refer to:

- Church of the Immaculate Conception of Blessed Virgin Mary, Texas, United States
- Church of the Immaculate Conception of the Blessed Virgin Mary, Venta, Lithuania
- Church of the Immaculate Conception of the Blessed Virgin Mary, Warsaw, Poland
- Immaculate Conception of the Blessed Virgin Mary Church (Bronx), United States

== See also ==
- Church of the Immaculate Conception (disambiguation)
