= Basilica of the Immaculate Conception =

Basilica of the Immaculate Conception may refer to:

== Benin ==
- Basilique de l'Immaculée Conception, Ouidah

== Colombia ==
- Metropolitan Cathedral-Basilica of the Immaculate Conception, or Primatial Cathedral of Bogotá, Bogotá
- Basilica of the Immaculate Conception (Jardín)
- Metropolitan Cathedral Basilica of the Immaculate Conception, or Metropolitan Cathedral of Medellín, Medellín

== Equatorial Guinea ==
- Basilica of the Immaculate Conception, Mongomo

== France ==
- Basilica of Our Lady of the Immaculate Conception, Lourdes

== Mexico ==
- Minor Basilica and Metropolitan Cathedral of the Immaculate Conception, or Mazatlán Cathedral, Mazatlán, see list of Roman Catholic basilicas

== Philippines ==
- Minor Basilica and Metropolitan Cathedral of the Immaculate Conception, or Manila Cathedral, Manila
- Minor Basilica of Our Lady of Immaculate Conception, or Malolos Cathedral, Malolos, Bulacan
- Minor Basilica of the Immaculate Conception (Batangas City)

== Taiwan ==
- Basilica of the Immaculate Conception, or Wanchin Church, Wanchin

== Saint Lucia ==
- Cathedral Basilica of the Immaculate Conception in Castries

== Spain ==
- Basilica of the Immaculate Conception (Barcelona)

== United States ==
- Basilica of the Immaculate Conception (Waterbury, Connecticut)
- Basilica of the Immaculate Conception (Jacksonville), Florida
- Basilica of the Immaculate Conception (Natchitoches, Louisiana)
- Basilica of Saint Mary of the Immaculate Conception (Norfolk, Virginia)
- Basilica of the National Shrine of the Immaculate Conception, Washington, D.C.
- Cathedral Basilica of the Immaculate Conception (Mobile, Alabama)
- Cathedral Basilica of the Immaculate Conception (Denver), Colorado
- Basilica of the Immaculate Conception, or Conception Abbey, Conception, Missouri

== Vietnam ==
- Cathedral Basilica of Our Lady of The Immaculate Conception, or Notre-Dame Cathedral Basilica of Saigon, Ho Chi Minh City

== See also ==
- Cathedral of the Immaculate Conception (disambiguation)
- Church of the Immaculate Conception (disambiguation)
