= St. Mary of the Immaculate Conception Church =

St. Mary of the Immaculate Conception Church may refer to:

- St Mary Immaculate Church, Falmouth, Cornwall, United Kingdom
- St. Mary of the Immaculate Conception Church (Wilmington, Delaware), United States
- St. Mary of the Immaculate Conception Church (Morges, Ohio), United States
- St. Mary of the Immaculate Conception Roman Catholic Church (Fredericksburg, Virginia), United States

== See also ==
- St. Mary's Church (disambiguation)
- Church of the Immaculate Conception (disambiguation)
