= Church of Our Lady Immaculate =

Church of Our Lady Immaculate may refer to:

- Basilica of Our Lady Immaculate, Guelph, Canada
- Our Lady Immaculate Church, Chelmsford, Essex, England
- Our Lady Immaculate and St Joseph Church, Prescot, Merseyside, England

== See also ==
- Church of the Immaculate Conception (disambiguation)
