= Immaculate Conception Church, Smolensk =

Coordinates: 54.7733°N 32.0535°E

Immaculate Conception Church
- Храм Непорочного Зачатия Пресвятой Девы Марии
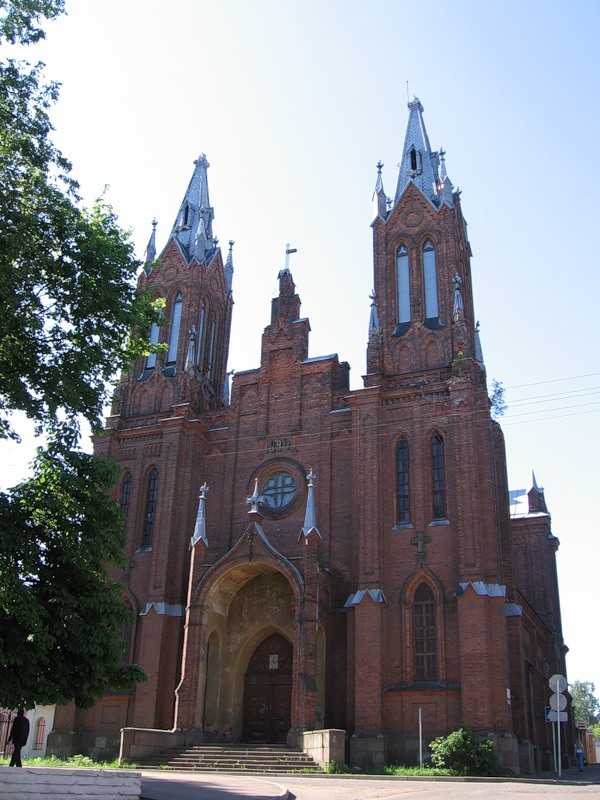
- Immaculate Conception Church
- Location: Smolensk
- Country: Russia
- Denomination: Roman Catholic Church
- Website: http://catholic-smolensk.com

History
- Founded: 1896

Architecture
- Architect: Dubeykovsky Leon Ivanovich
- Architectural type: Neo-Gothic
- Years built: 1636-1638

The Immaculate Conception Church (Russian: Храм Непорочного Зачатия Пресвятой Девы Марии; Polish: Kościół wezwaniem Niepokalanego Najświętszej Maryi) is an old Catholic church in the city of Smolensk in Russia. This neo-Gothic building was built from 1884 to 1896 and hosted the Regional Archive of Smolensk. It is in a state of disrepair and is scheduled for complete restoration. It has a large body and remarkable stained glass windows. Religious services are now partial. The number of parishioners is around 9,000.

== History ==
The church was consecrated on October 23, 1896, then the parish church was part of the Archdiocese of Mohilev.

The construction committee included the abbot Stefan Denisevich, the author of the project — governoral architect Mikhail F. Meisher and engineer Leon Dubeykovsky. Later, the governoral architect Yevgeny Ferdinandovich Lyshinsky was invited.

On June 29, 1897, the new church was consecrated.

The interior was decorated from 1897 to 1899 by Warsaw craftsmen. They painted the walls and vaults, they made colorful stained glass windows, painted canvases on the walls with biblical subjects.

In 1940 the church was closed, and the NKVD archive was located in the building. Since the 1950s the civil archive of the Smolensk region has been located here. In the mid-1980s the building was declared an emergency.

Records and parish archives were confiscated in 1918 during the Russian revolution. The parish meanwhile, which meets in one place, was closed during the Great Terror of 1937 and its curate executed along with a group of parishioners. The old church became a repository in 1940, just before the arrival of the Wehrmacht in 1941.

In 1995 the church received the status of a cultural monument of regional importance.

The Catholic community obtained permission from the 2000s to use the former rectory of ceremonies as a chapel, which was restored. Governor Sergei Antoufiev said in October 2010 that a new repository for files would be built and the church would be restored from 2011 through funds provided by Poland.

By early 2015 the building was empty and was classified as a specialized building.

== See also ==
- Roman Catholicism in Russia
- Immaculate Conception Church

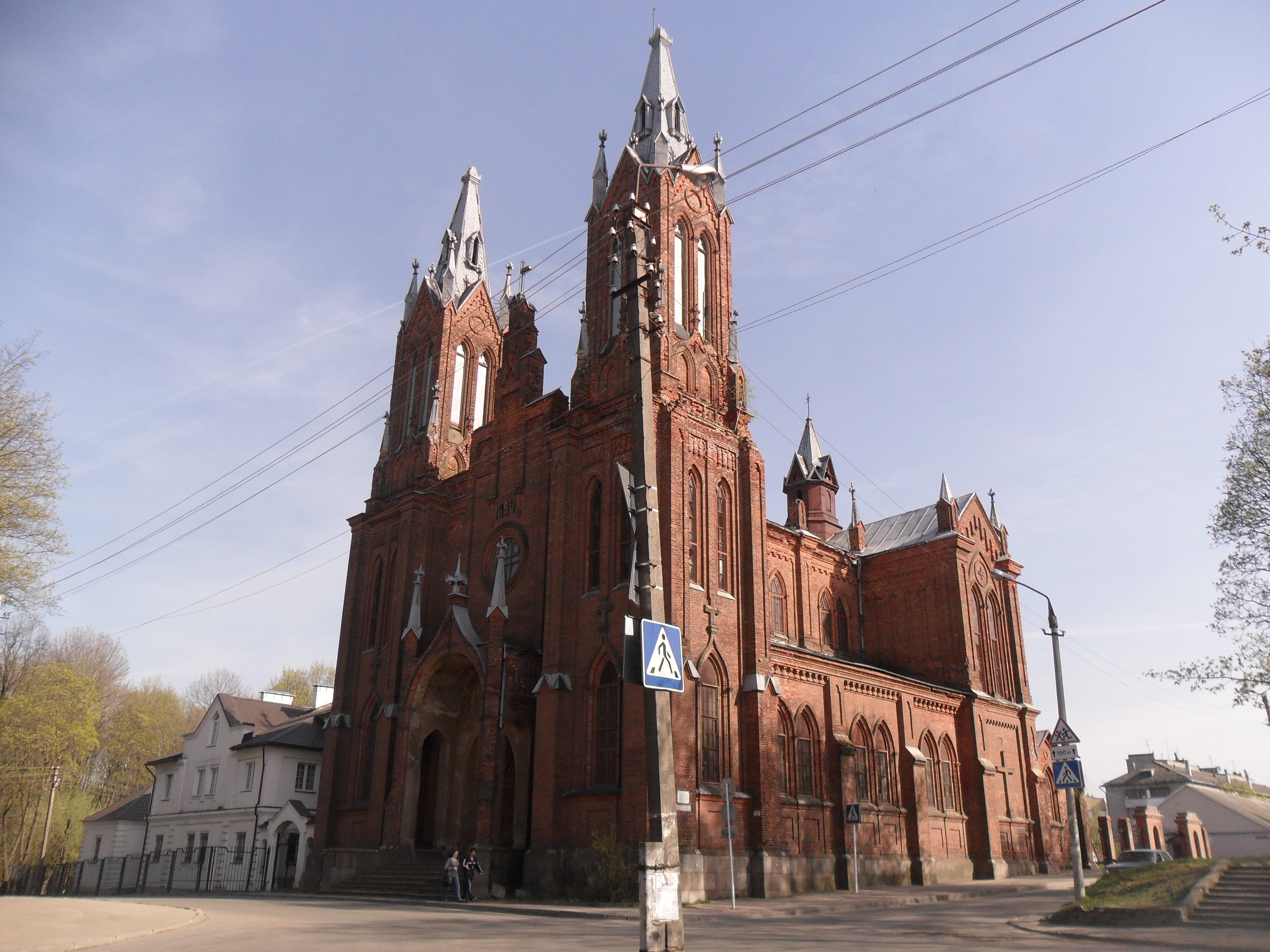
Immaculate Conception Church, Smolensk
