= Chapel of the Immaculate Conception, Franciscan Convent =

Chapel of the Immaculate Conception
- Chapel of the Immaculate Conception, Franciscan Convent
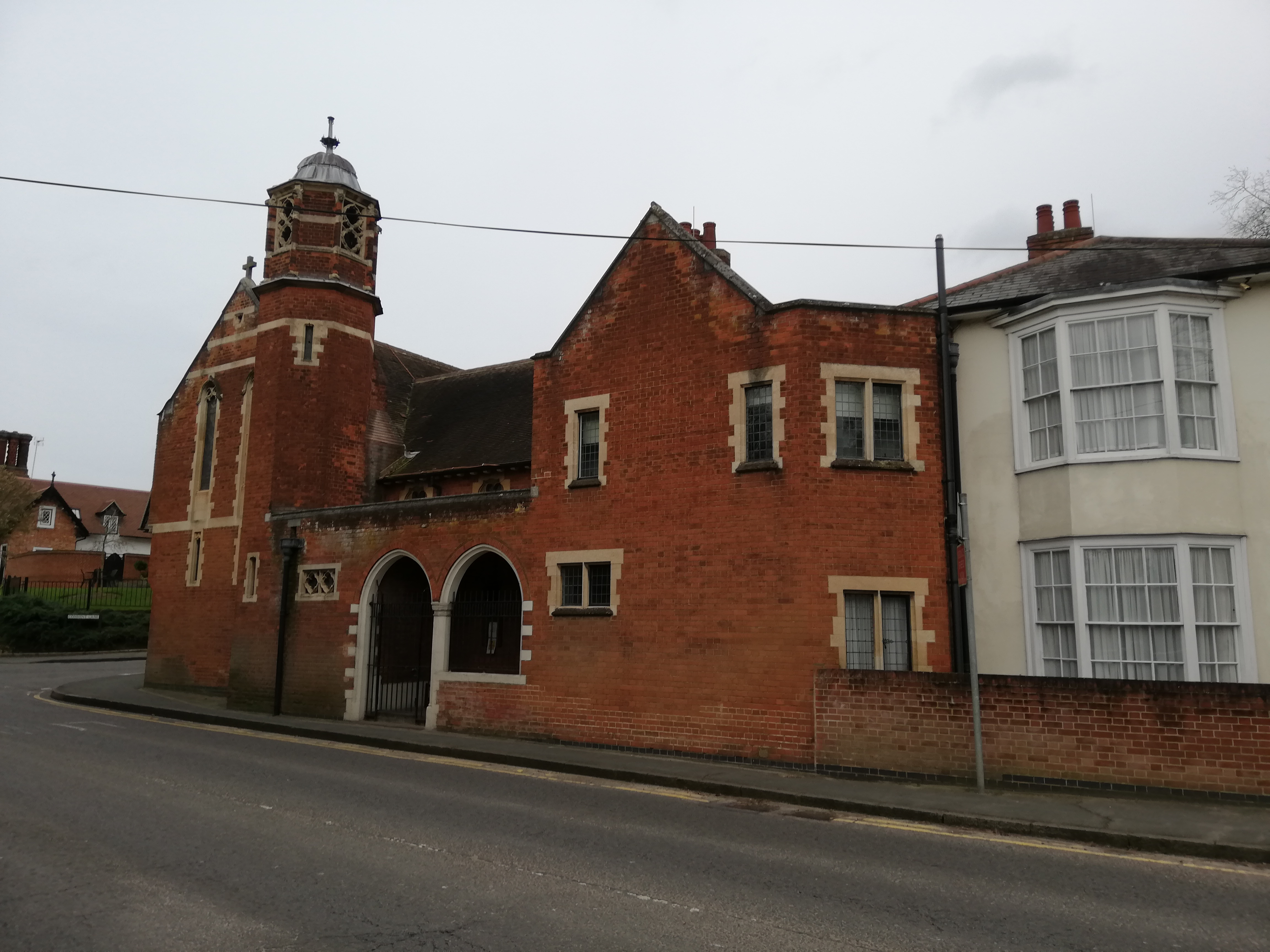
- Chapel of the Immaculate Conception
- 51.8899°N 0.5606°E
- Location: Broad Road, Bocking
- Country: England
- Denomination: Roman Catholic
- Tradition: Latin Church
- Religious order: Franciscans

Architecture
- Heritage designation: Grade II
- Designated: 1898
- Architect: John Francis Bentley
- Architectural type: Georgian Revival

Administration
- Diocese: Roman Catholic Diocese of Brentwood

Clergy
- Bishop: Alan Williams
- Priest: David Manson

The Chapel of the Immaculate Conception, Franciscan Convent is a Roman Catholic chapel run by the Missionary Franciscan Sisters in Bocking, Essex, England.

== History ==
John Francis Bentley, the architect of Westminster Cathedral, completed his plans for the chapel in 1898 and it was completed in May 1899.

== Description ==
According to Historic England, the building is

[a]n irregular group of red brick buildings with stone dressings...The chapel is gabled at the west end, with stone bands,2 lancet windows and a large octagonal tower at the south-west corner. The upper stage of the tower has a belfry with ornamental stone traceried openings, crowned by a stone dome and finial. A wing at the south end is gabled, with a splayed corner adjoining the early C19 convent building to the south. The centre part, with the entranceway, is set back behind a screen wall connecting the tower and the south wing. It is pierced by 2 pointed arches with a central column. The windows are metal casements with leaded lights, in stone dressed reveals. Roofs tiled.

The chapel has been listed Grade II on the National Heritage List for England since 1973.
