= Immaculate Conception Catholic Church (Lihue, Hawaii) =

Coordinates: 21°59′25″N 159°21′50″W

- Immaculate Conception Catholic Church
- Address: 4453 Kapaia Rd, Lihue, Hawaii 96766
- Country: USA
- Denomination: Roman Catholic
- Website: www.icchurchlihue.com

Administration
- Diocese: Diocese of Honolulu

Immaculate Conception Catholic Church in Lihue is a parish of the Roman Catholic Church of Hawaii in the United States. Located in Lihue on the island of Kauai, the church falls under the jurisdiction of the Diocese of Honolulu and its bishop. It is named after the Blessed Virgin Mary. The church was built in 1924.
