= Immaculate Conception Church (Iron Mountain, Michigan) =

Historic church in Michigan, United States

- U.S. National Register of Historic Places
- Michigan State Historic Site
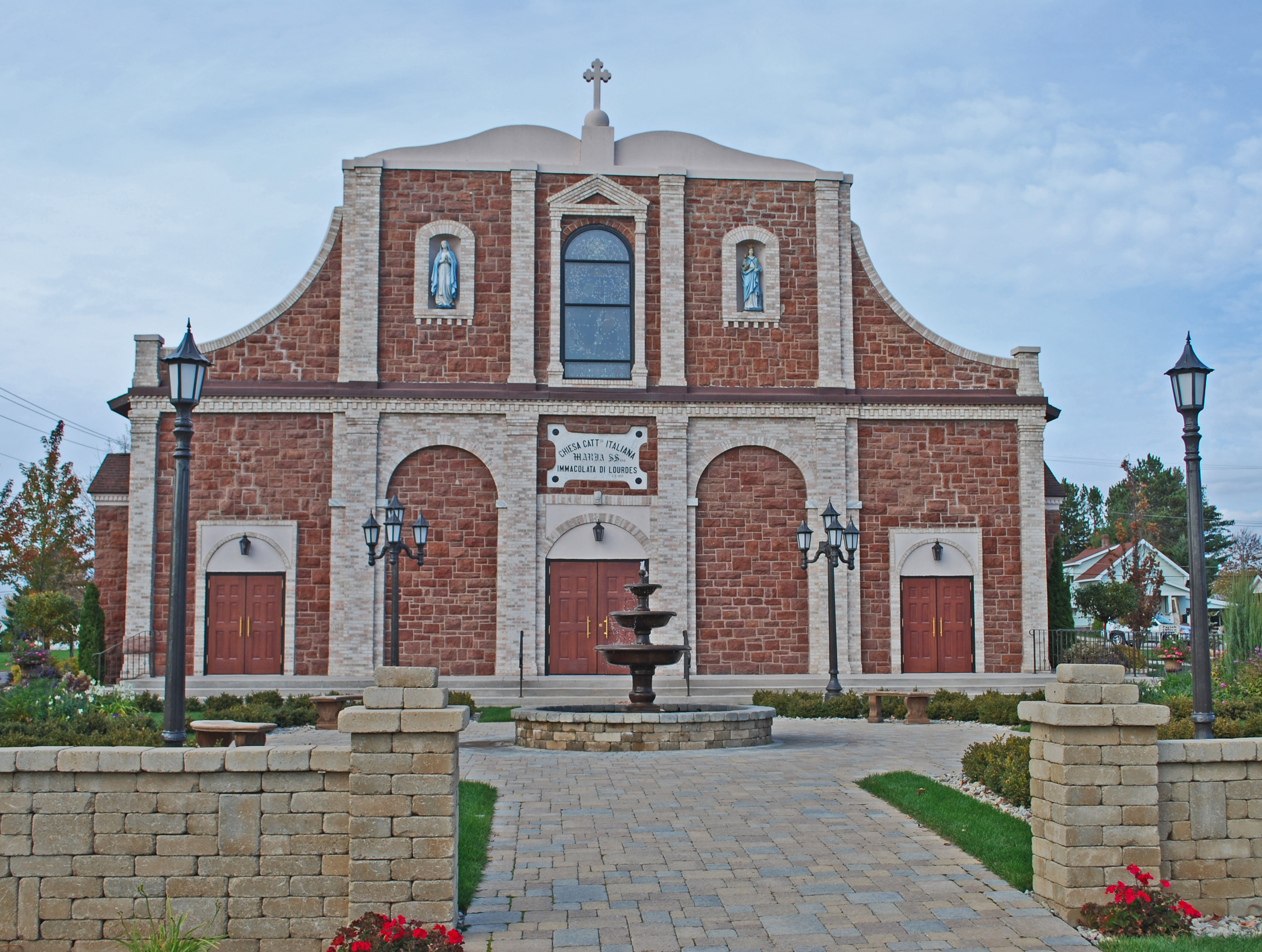

- Location within Michigan
- Interactive map
- Location: 500 E. Blaine St., Iron Mountain, Michigan
- Coordinates: 45°49′59″N 88°3′20″W
- Area: 1 acre (0.40 ha)
- Built: 1902
- Architect: Fr. Giovanni Sinopoli di Giunta
- Architectural style: Renaissance Revival architecture
- NRHP reference No.: 90000562

Significant dates
- Added to NRHP: April 05, 1990
- Designated MSHS: June 15, 1979

The Immaculate Conception Church is a Catholic church in Italian Renaissance Revival style located at 500 E. Blaine Street in Iron Mountain, Michigan, US. It was designated a Michigan State Historic Site in 1979 and listed on the National Register of Historic Places in 1990. It is also known as Mary Immaculate of Lourdes Church.

== History ==
In the late 19th century a flood of Italian immigrants arrived in Iron Mountain to work in the nearby iron mines. These Italian Catholics first worshipped at St. Joseph's in downtown Iron Mountain. However, in 1890, those living on the north side of the city organized an "Italian Church," and received permission to start their own parish. That year, they constructed a frame structure near the site of the present church and a priest was assigned to the parish. The original frame church burned down in 1893, but work quickly began on a replacement.

In April 1902 Father Giovanni Sinopoli di Giunta arrived in Iron Mountain to serve as the parish priest. Father Sinopoli was a former count from Sicily who had renounced his title in order to serve Italian immigrants in the United States. The new priest quickly organized a building committee to fund the construction of a new church and drew up plans for the building himself. A donation drive quickly raised nearly US$4,000, and in June 1902 Father Sinopoli began digging the foundation himself. In July the cornerstone was laid, and construction on the church continued quickly. Father Sinopoli acted as engineer, architect, and building foreman, and numerous men from the parish volunteered their labor. The superintendent of the local Pewabic Mine, E.F. Brown, donated timber and sent workers to assist in construction, paying their salaries out of his own pocket. The church was completed in December, 1902, and on January 1, 1903, was dedicated to Mary Immaculate of Lourdes.

Father Sinopoli stayed with the parish for only one year, but left an organized church with a new building. Further improvements and additions were made through the years. In 1923 a rectory was built for the church. In 1942 catechism classes were organized; these classes evolved into year-round education, and in 1955 the parish opened a school which eventually served children in the first through eighth grades. Both Tom Izzo and Steve Mariucci attended the Immaculate Conception school in the first grade. In 1971 the school consolidated with other nearby Catholic schools, and the Immaculate Conception school housed first through third grades. In 1990 the schools were consolidated further, and all classes were taught downtown. The former Immaculate Conception school was leased to the Iron Mountain school district.

Significant upgrades were made to the church in the 1960s, and the exterior was repaired in the 1980s. The church was designated a Michigan State Historic Site in 1979 and listed on the National Register of Historic Places in 1990.

== Description ==
This church, similar to Renaissance parish churches in Italy, echoes the architectural traditions of the Italian immigrants who built it. It is a rectangular plan church with a central nave, constructed of random coursed sandstone. The main church has a gable-end pitched roof, with a two-story hipped-roof section at the rear. A striking octagonal bell tower, fashioned after a campanile and topped with a pierced belfry, is also located at the rear of the structure. Unusual timber trusses support a wooden barrel-vaulted ceiling. Stained glass windows, at least three of which were made by the Menominee Stained Glass Works, are set in bricked arched window wells and light the nave.

The front facade has two blind arches, flanked by pilasters, framing the central entrance. Shorter side bays on each side are joined to the main facade with curved walls which obscure the gable end of the roof. Two niches hold statues of saints.

== Gallery ==
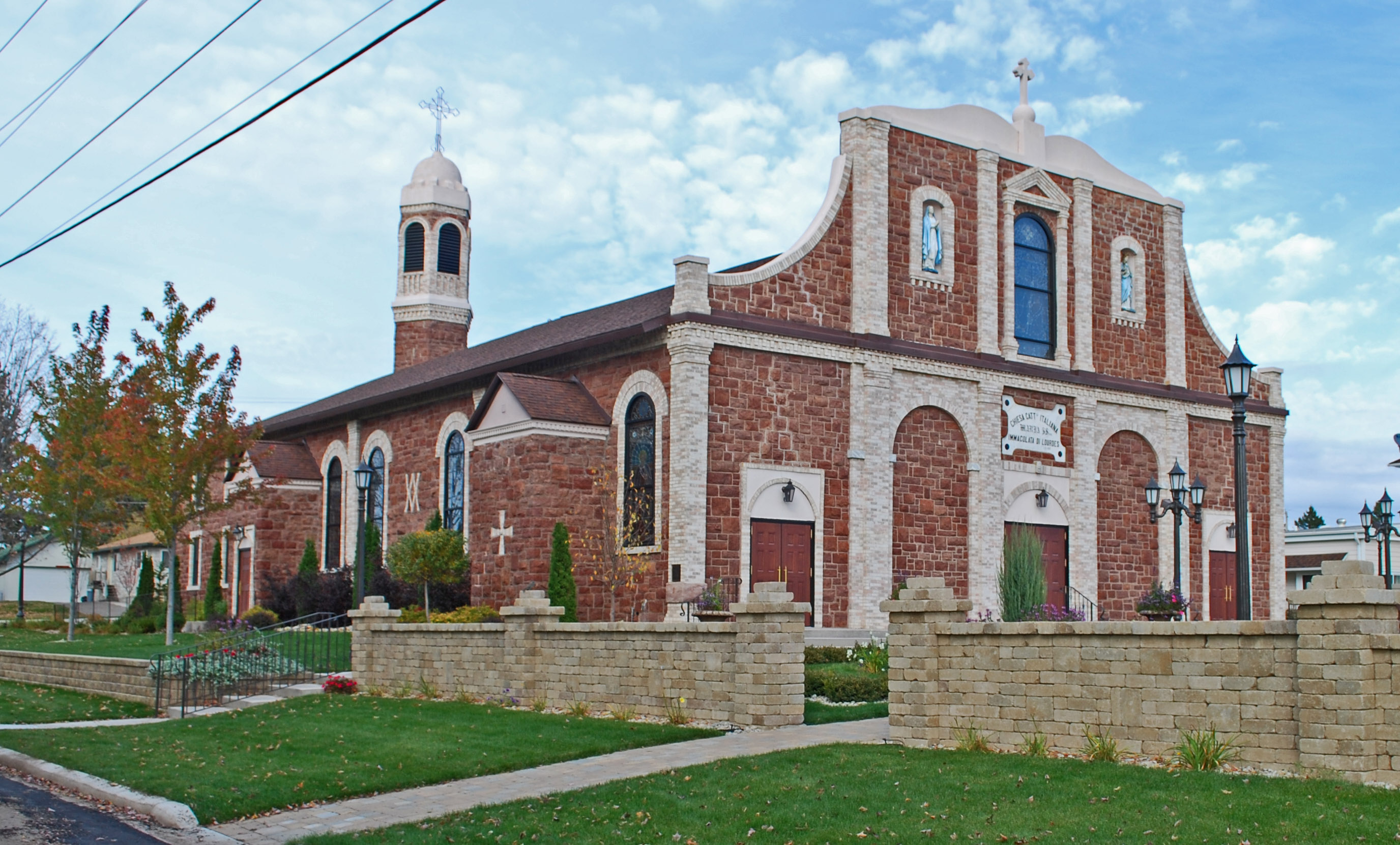

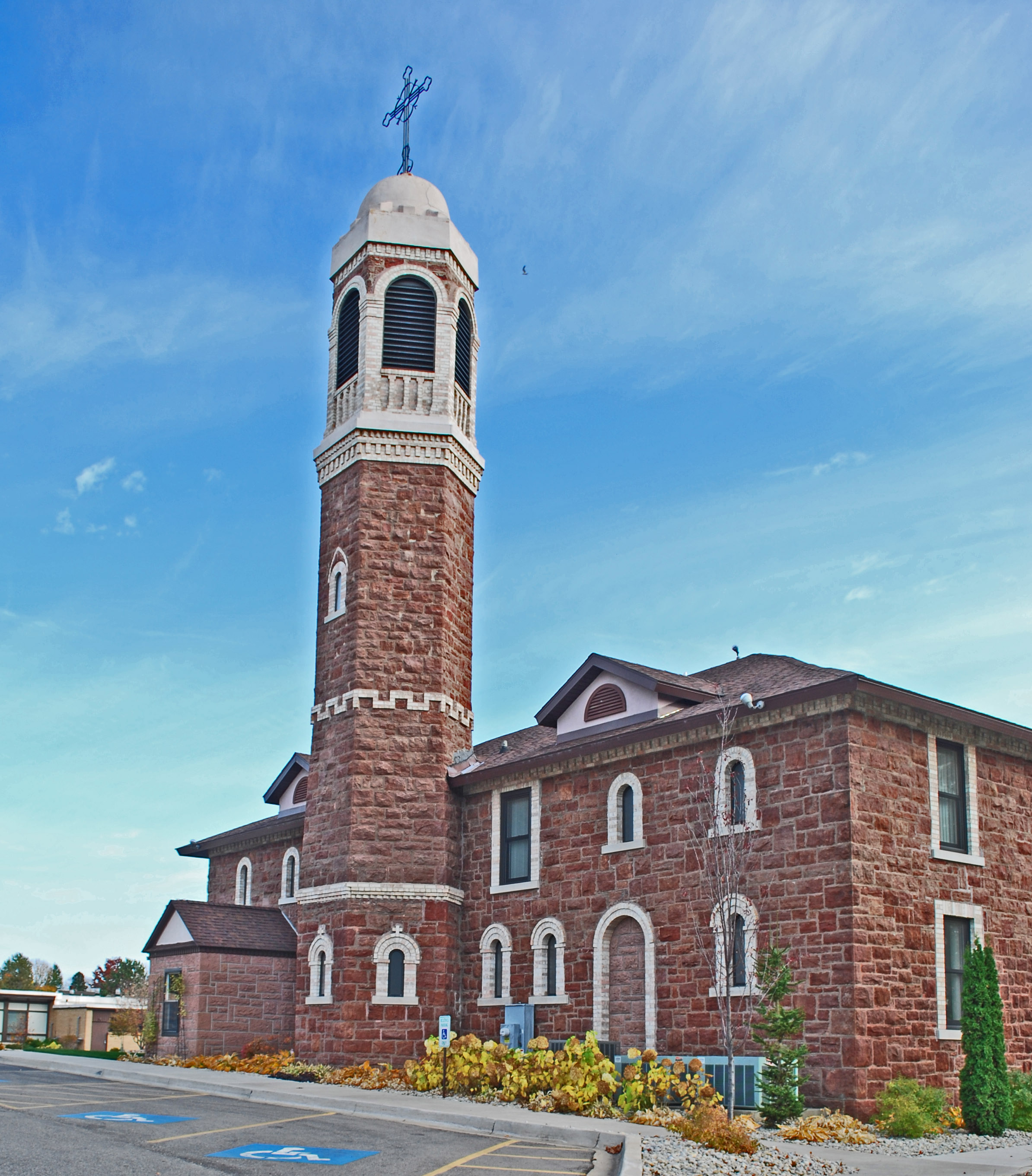
