= Church of the Immaculate Conception, Jinan =

- 济南圣母无染原罪堂
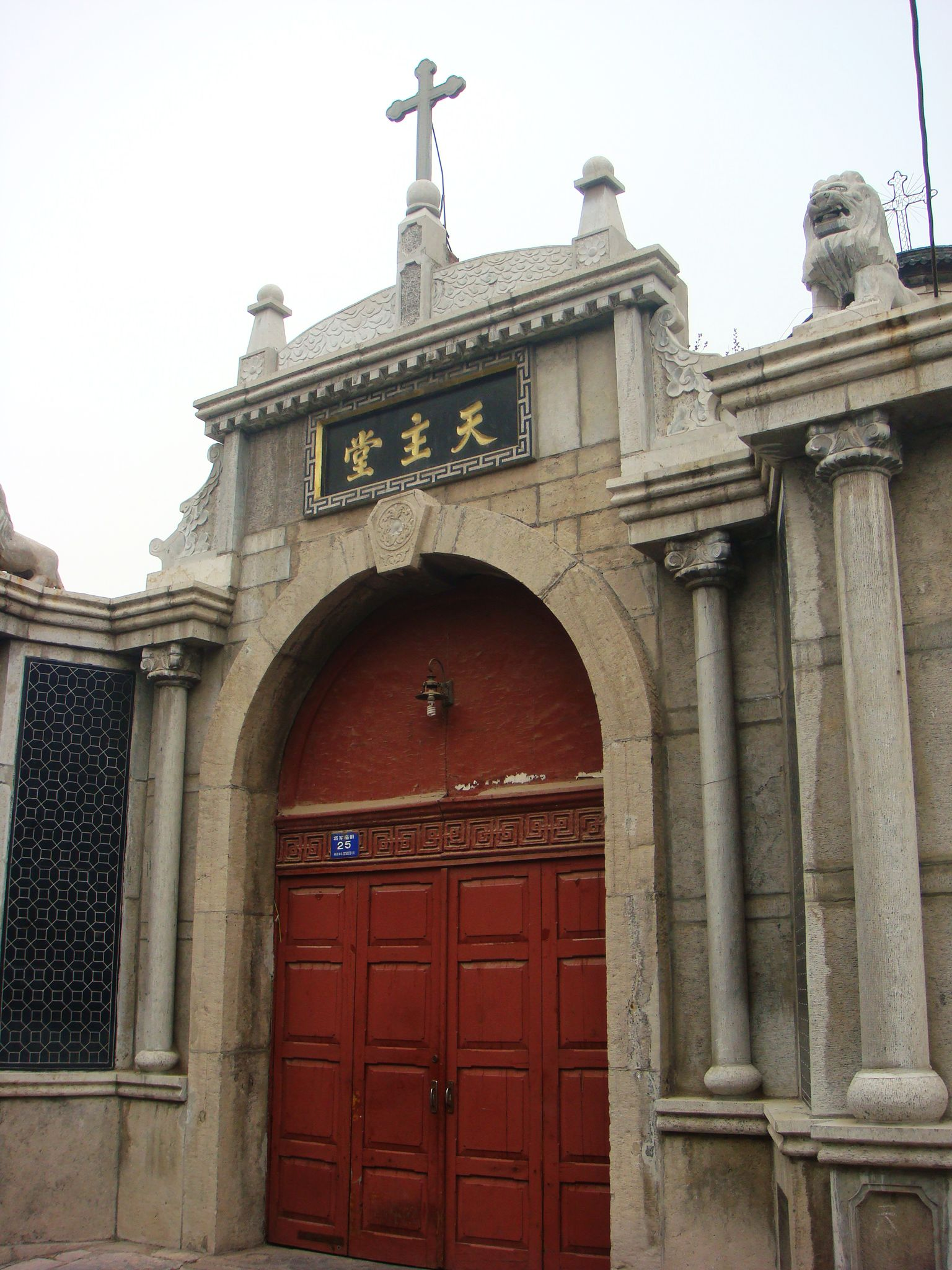
- Entrance of the Church

- Location in Guangdong
- 36°40′21″N 117°01′27″E
- Location: Jinan, Shandong, China
- Denomination: Roman Catholic

History
- Status: Parish church
- Founded: 1651
- Founder: Jaboulet

Architecture
- Functional status: Active
- Architectural type: Church building
- Style: Romanesque architectural style
- Groundbreaking: 1864 (reconstruction)
- Completed: 1866 (reconstruction)
- Demolished: 1724

Specifications
- Materials: Granite

Administration
- Archdiocese: Roman Catholic Archdiocese of Jinan

Chinese name
- Simplified Chinese: 济南圣母无染原罪堂
- Traditional Chinese: 濟南聖母無染原罪堂
Transcriptions
Standard Mandarin
- Hanyu Pinyin: Jĭnán Shèngmǔ Wúrăn Yuánzuì Táng

Jiangjunmiao Catholic Church
- Simplified Chinese: 将军庙天主堂
- Traditional Chinese: 將軍廟天主堂
- Literal meaning: Catholic Church of General Temple
Transcriptions
Standard Mandarin
- Hanyu Pinyin: Jiāngjūn Miào Tiānzhǔ Táng

The Church of the Immaculate Conception, Jinan (Chinese: 济南圣母无染原罪堂), locally known as Jiangjunmiao Catholic Church (将军庙天主堂), is the oldest Catholic church in Jinan, Shandong, China.

== History ==
The original church dates back to 1651, founded by Jaboulet (嘉伯乐), a Spanish missionary of the Franciscans. After the Chinese Rites controversy broke out, Yongzheng Emperor of the Qing dynasty (1644–1911) ordered to demolish churches, confiscate church lands and force Catholics to return to secular life. In 1861, French bishop Luigi Moccagatta (江类思) came to Shandong and proposed to the Qing government to rebuild the Catholic church in Jiangjunmiao Street (将军庙街; 'General Temple Street'), which was approved. The reconstruction project started in 1864 with Romanesque architectural style by Italian bishop Eligio Pietro Cosi (顾立爵) and was completed two years later. The church was named "Church of the Immaculate Conception" and used as the Cathedral of the Roman Catholic Archdiocese of Jinan. The abbey and episcopal office were added to the church in 1863 and the Haixing School (海星学堂) was added to the church in 1898, respectively. In 1905, the Sacred Heart Cathedral replaced it as the cathedral of the Roman Catholic Archdiocese of Jinan. The church was closed in 1966 due to the Cultural Revolution. It was officially reopened to the public on 23 June 1979. In October 2013, it was designated as a provincial cultural relic preservation organ by the Shandong government.
