= Chapel of the Immaculate Conception, Wied Gerżuma =

Chapel of the Immaculate Conception
- The Church of the Immaculate Conception
- Kappella tal-Immakulata Kunċizzjoni
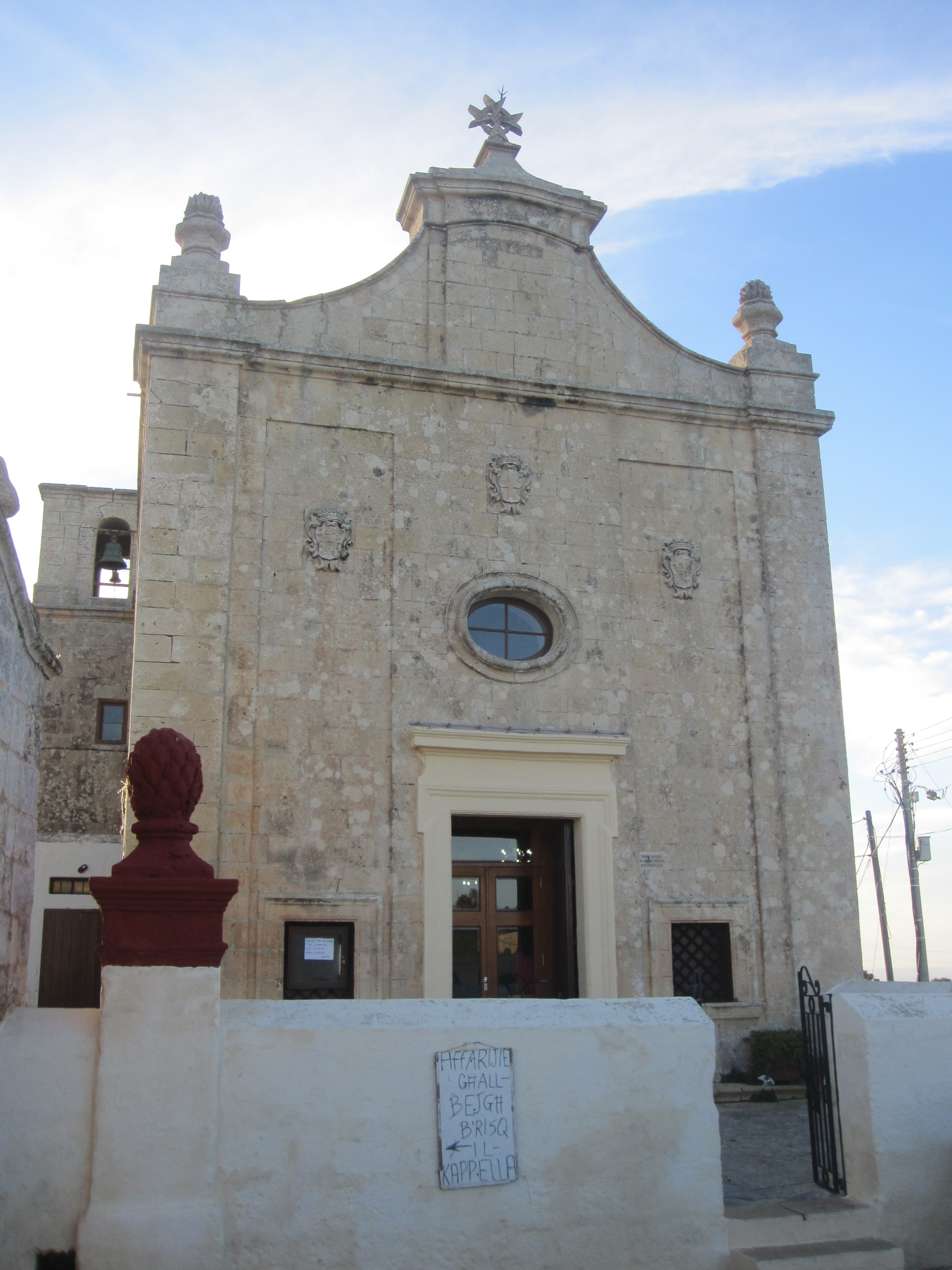
- Chapel of the Immaculate Conception
- 35°53′59″N 14°20′57″E
- Location: Rabat
- Country: Malta
- Denomination: Roman Catholic

History
- Status: Active
- Founded: 1736
- Founder: António Manoel de Vilhena
- Dedication: Immaculate Conception

Architecture
- Functional status: Church

Administration
- Archdiocese: Malta

Clergy
- Archbishop: Charles Scicluna

The Church of the Immaculate Conception is a wayside Roman Catholic church located in what is known as Wied Gerżuma or Gerżuma valley, limits of Rabat, Malta.

== History ==
The chapel originated in 1736 on lands owned by the Fondazione Paola which was a foundation that supported the building of sailing boats for the knights. The chapel was founded by Grand master António Manoel de Vilhena. Near the chapel is an arch on which is the coat of arms of Antoine de Paule, the Grand master who founded the Fondazione Paola and an inscription. The chapel was blessed by Fra Giuseppe Ruggier, the chaplain of the order, representing the grand prior of St John's Conventional church in Valletta. Since the church was the property of the Sovereign Military Order of Malta, the property was inherited by the subsequent governments that governed Malta after the expulsion of the order from Malta in 1798. In fact, the chapel is still the property of the state.

== Interior ==
The chapel has one altar. Above it stands the painting depicting the Immaculate Conception, St Joseph, St Paul, St John the Baptist and St Anthony of Padoua.

== See also ==
- Catholic Church in Malta
