= Immaculate Conception Parish, Southington =

Coordinates: 41°35′45.6″N 72°53′16″W

Immaculate Conception Parish
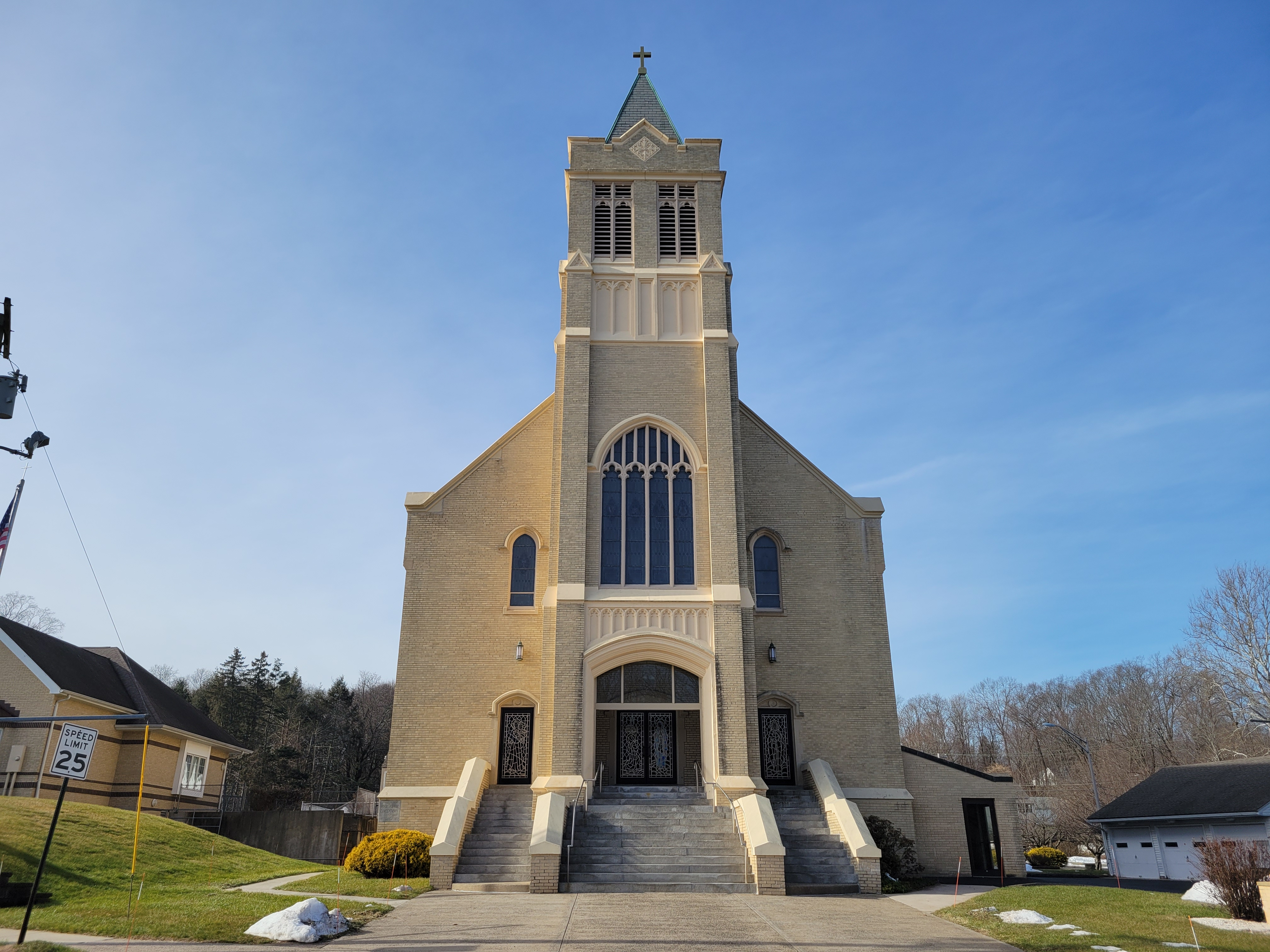
- Immaculate Conception Church
- Immaculate Conception Parish
- Location: 130 Summer Street; Southington, Connecticut
- Country: United States
- Denomination: Roman Catholic
- Website: Parish website

History
- Founded: September 19, 1915
- Founder: Polish immigrants
- Dedication: Immaculate Conception
- Dedicated: October 28, 1923

Architecture
- Closed: April 26, 2022

Administration
- Division: Vicariate: New Haven
- Province: Hartford
- Archdiocese: Hartford

Clergy
- Archbishop: Most Rev. Christopher J. Coyne

Immaculate Conception Parish - designated for Polish immigrants in Southington, Connecticut, United States. Founded on September 19, 1915. It is one of the Polish-American Roman Catholic parishes in New England in the Archdiocese of Hartford.

== History ==
In 1904 the Polish immigrants organized the Guardian Angel Society in an effort to found a Polish parish. In 1906, a committee of the society asked Bishop Michael Tierney for a Polish priest. None was then available. By 1910 Bishop John Joseph Nilan sent Fr. John Sullivan to serve the immigrants within St. Thomas Parish. A new Polish Catholic parish was officially approved in September 1915 by Bishop John Joseph Nilan. Property was secured as a future church site, along with a house to serve as a rectory. On September 19, 1915, Fr. Woroniecki celebrated the first parish Mass at a hall belonging to the Polish Falcons. On July 9, 1916, Bishop John Joseph Nilan dedicated the basement church of Immaculate Conception Parish. The completed church was finally dedicated on October 28, 1923.

By a decree of April 26, 2022 from the archbishop of Hartford, Immaculate Conception Parish was amalgamated into a newly formed parish. Along with Immaculate Conception, the other parishes of Southington and Plantsville: St. Dominic, Mary Our Queen, and St. Aloysius were subsumed into St. Thomas Parish, which was then renamed St. Luke Parish.

Mary Our Queen Church was relegated to profane but not sordid use by a decree of June 5, 2025. On April 8, 2025 the moderator of St. Luke Parish, along with the trustees and parish and finance councils informed the archbishop that the buildings of Immaculate Conception Church are no longer needed for divine worship and they were in disrepair and unusable, thus a financial burden to the parish. In a decree published on October 9, 2025, the archbishop wrote that as of November 11, 2025, the building of Immaculate Conception Church would no longer be a sacred place for divine worship and would lose its blessing, dedication, and consecration and be relegated to sordid but not profane use.

== Bibliography ==
- The 150th Anniversary of Polish-American Pastoral Ministry. Webster, Massachusetts: St. Joseph Basilica. September 11, 2005.
- The Official Catholic Directory in USA
