= Chapel of the Immaculate Conception, St. Julian's =

Chapel of the Immaculate Conception
- The Church of the Immaculate Conception
- Kappella tal-Immakulata Kunċizzjoni
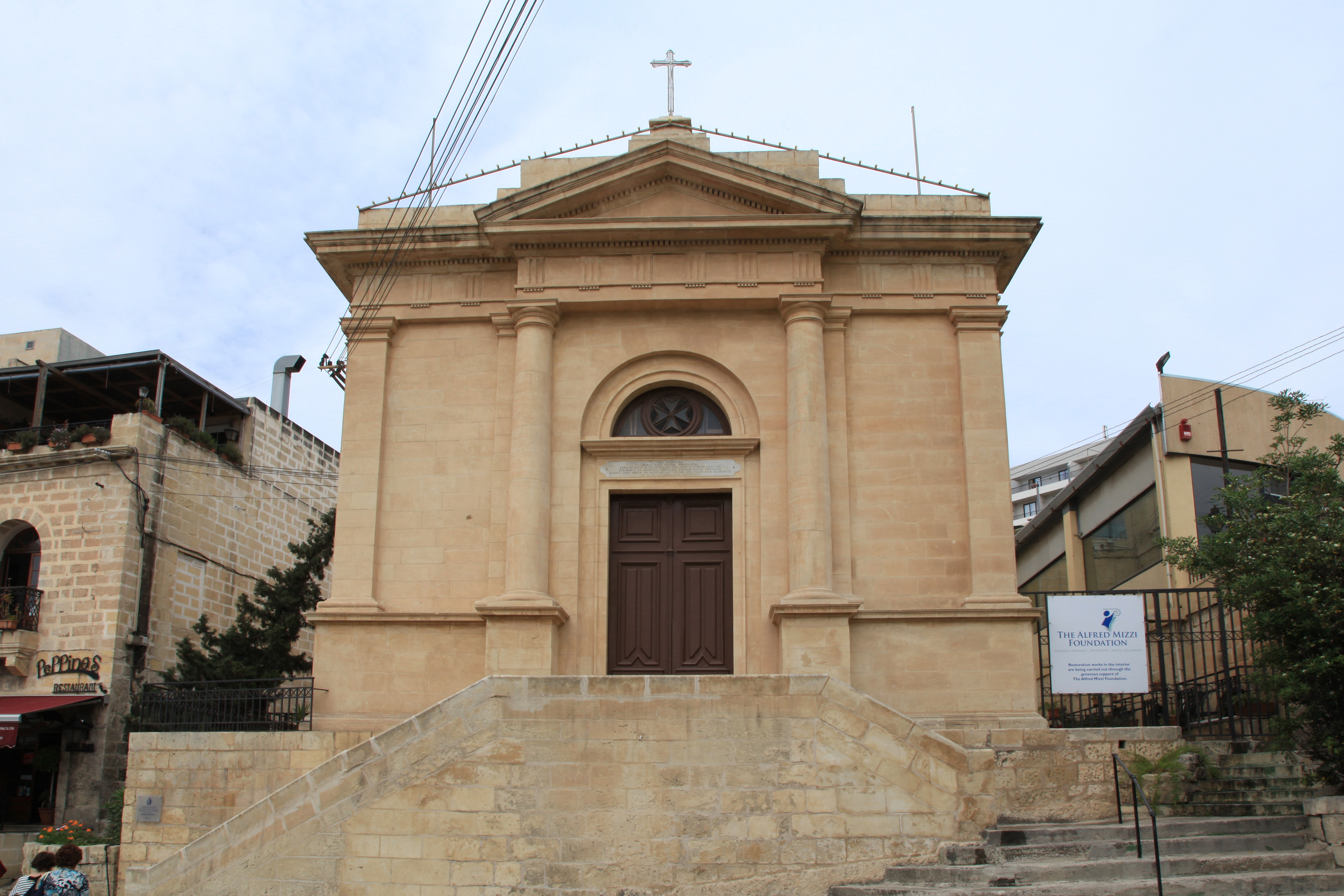
- The chapel in 2014
- Chapel of the Immaculate Conception
- 35°55′12″N 14°29′24″E
- Location: St. Julian's
- Country: Malta
- Denomination: Roman Catholic

History
- Status: Active
- Founded: 1687
- Founder: Fra Paolo Rafelg Spinola
- Dedication: Immaculate Conception
- Consecrated: 1688

Architecture
- Functional status: Church
- Heritage designation: Grade I
- Designated: 1995
- Completed: 1688

Administration
- Archdiocese: Malta

Clergy
- Archbishop: Charles Scicluna

The Chapel of the Immaculate Conception is a Roman Catholic chapel on Bajja 'ta Spinola in St Julian's, Malta. It was built as the church for the Spinola Palace nearby and dedicated to the Immaculate Conception.

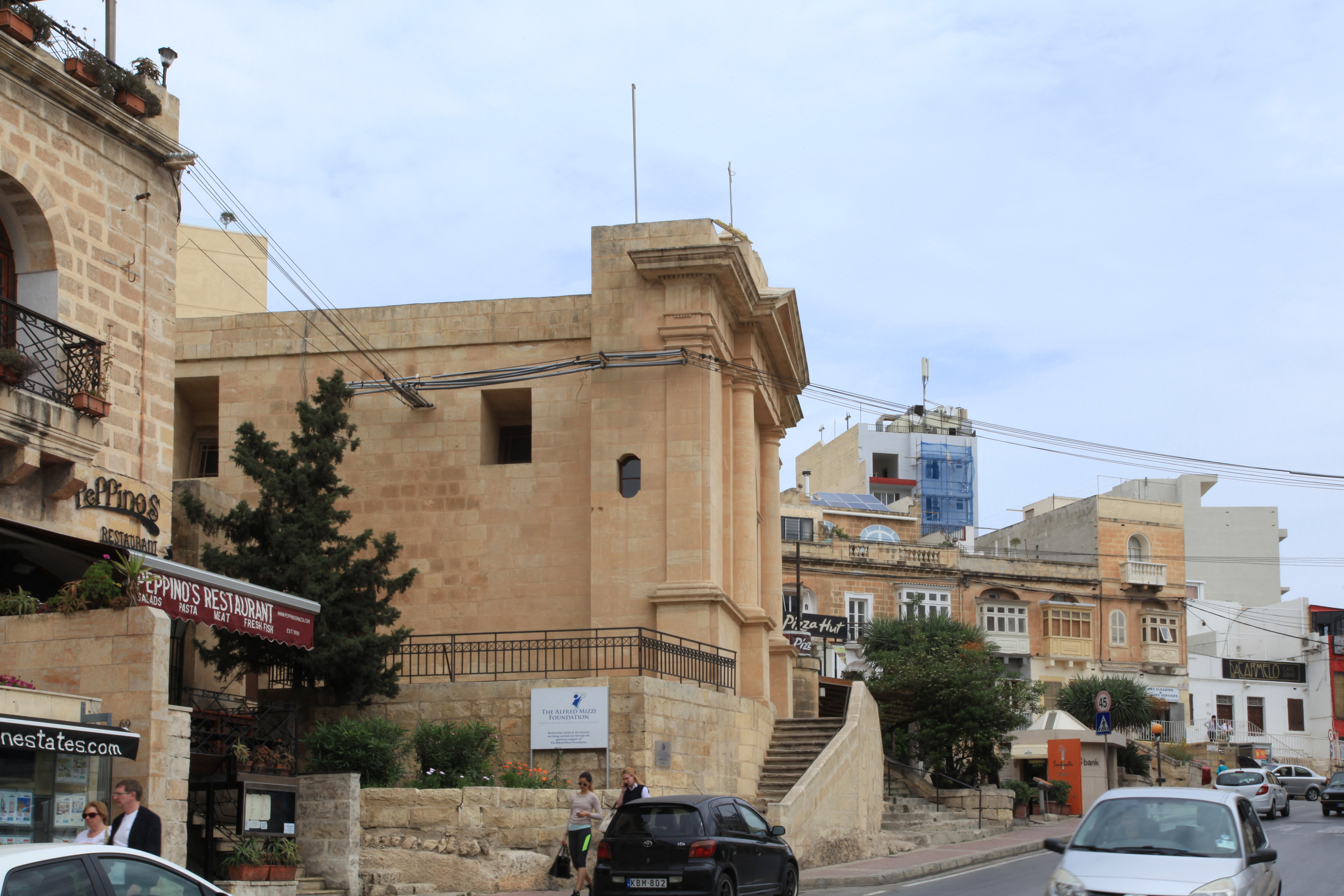
A side profile of the chapel

The chapel was built by Fra Paolo Rafel Spinola in close proximity to his palace. The chapel was completed in 1687 and enlarged at the beginning of the 20th century. A new façade was added to the chapel in 1914. It is listed on the National Inventory of the Cultural Property of the Maltese Islands. The first stone of the church was laid on 16 June 1687, and it was consecrated on 10 September 1688.
