= Immaculate Conception St. Mary's Church =

- Church of the Immaculate Conception
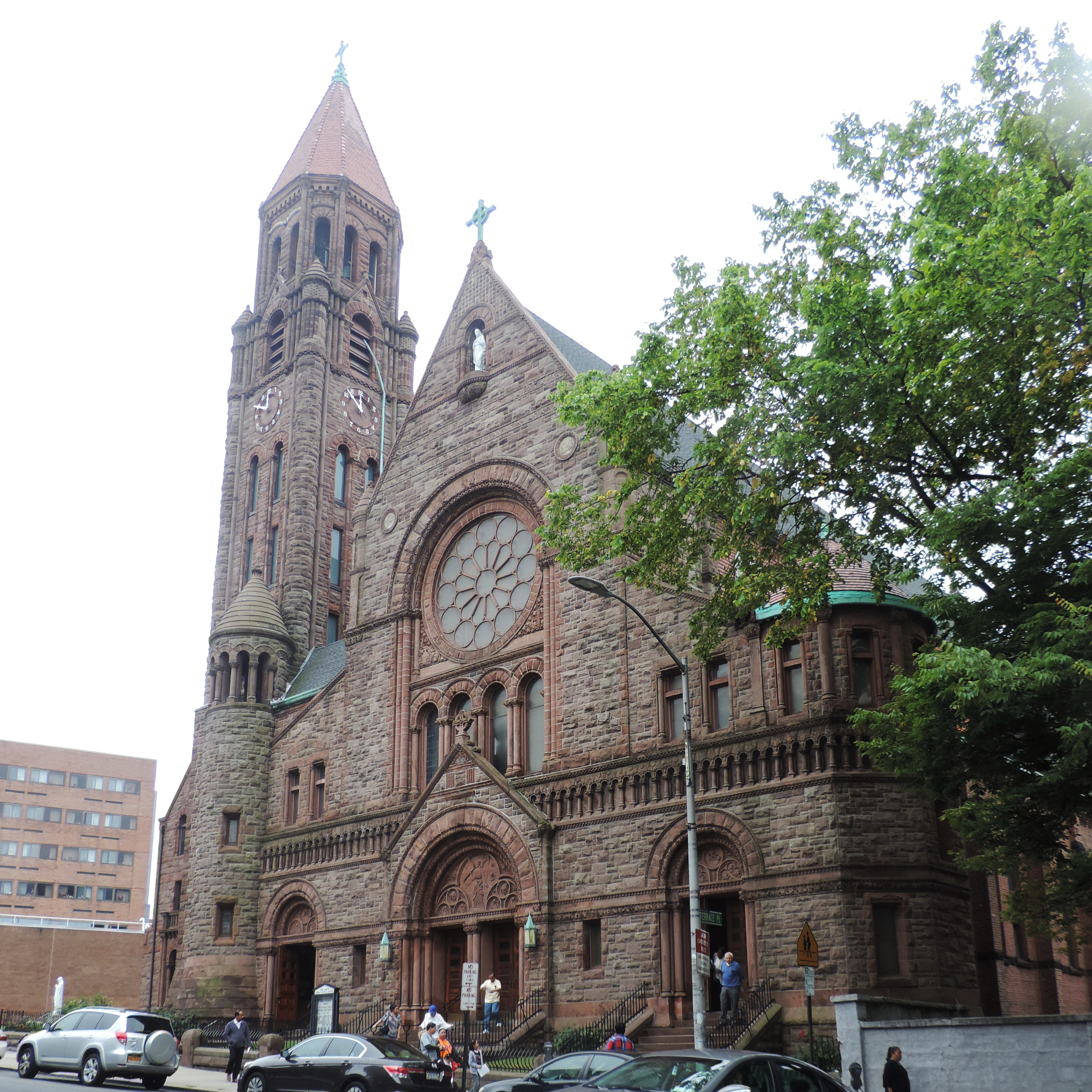
- Front façade of the church
- Immaculate Conception St. Mary's Church
- 40°55′49.8″N 73°53′54.4″W
- Location: 103 S Broadway, Yonkers, New York
- Country: United States
- Denomination: Catholic
- Website: icmary.com

History
- Status: Parish church
- Founded: 1848
- Dedication: Immaculate Conception
- Dedicated: November 16, 1851

Architecture
- Architect: Lawrence J. O'Connor
- Architectural type: Church
- Style: Richardsonian Romanesque

Administration
- Archdiocese: Archdiocese of New York

The Church of the Immaculate Conception, commonly known as Immaculate Conception St. Mary's Church, or simply St. Mary's Church, is a Catholic parish and church located in Yonkers, New York. It is the oldest Catholic parish in Yonkers.

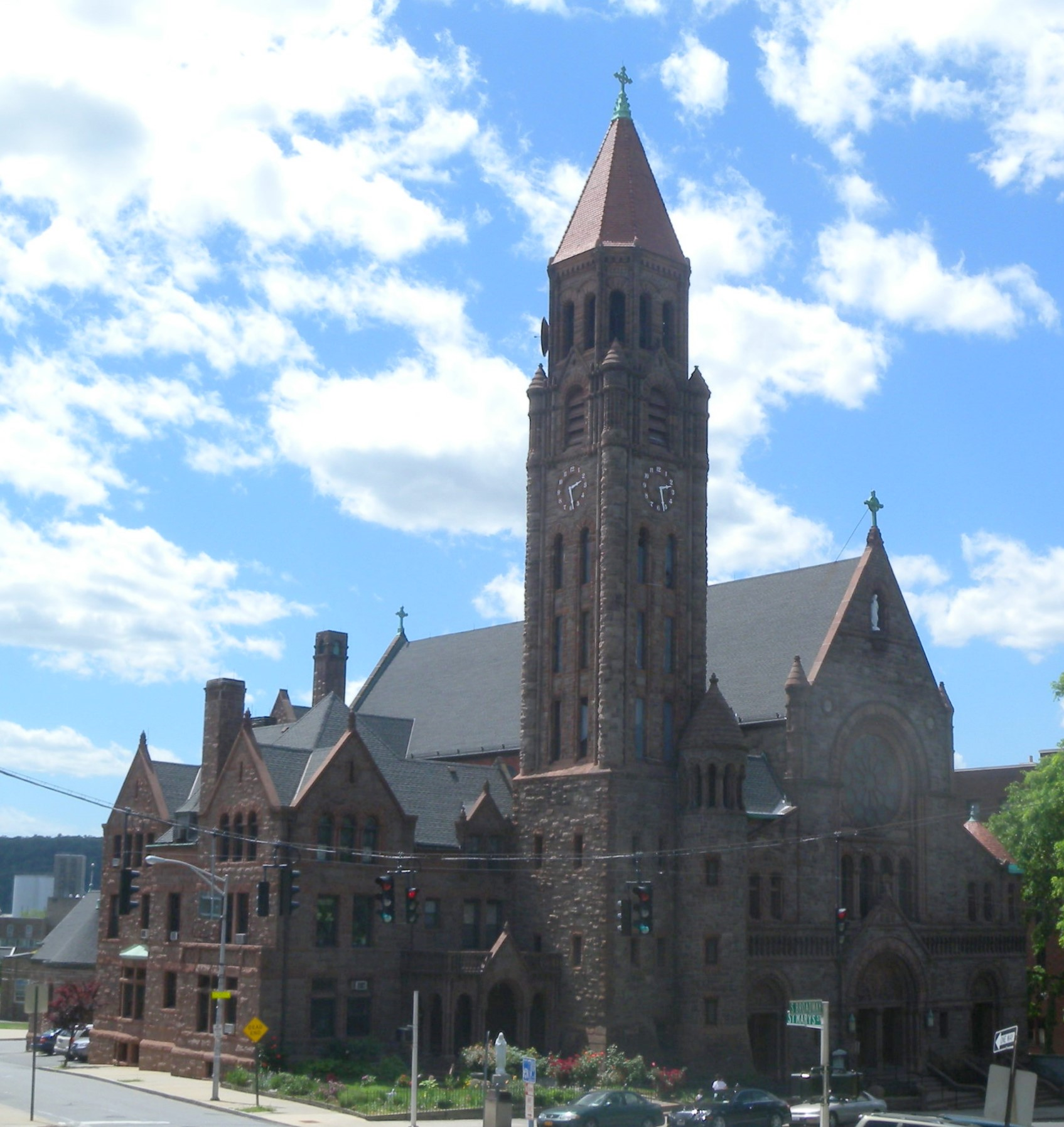
Three-quarter view of the church

== History ==
St. Mary's Church, as it was then named, was founded in 1848 as a parish consisting mostly of Irish immigrants to the United States. The first recorded baptisms in the parish occurred in October 1847. Land for the construction of a church building was donated by William W. Woodworth, Josiah Rich, and James Scrymser in the summer of that year, and Thomas Cornell, who was instrumental in the founding of the parish, had the street on which the land bordered to be renamed St. Mary's Street from South Street.

At its founding, the Jesuits played an active role in the administration of the parish. The first pastor was Fr. John Ryan, a Jesuit of St. John's College (the antecedent of Fordham University), who canonically established the parish and requested that it be named the Church of the Immaculate Conception, which it took as its official name by 1848, although it continued to be frequently referred to as St. Mary's. The original church was designed by Patrick Keely; it is now the parish hall.

The first mass was celebrated in the church on December 25, 1848, and the church was dedicated to the Immaculate Conception on November 16, 1851, making it the first church in the United States to be dedicated to the Immaculate Conception. (Note: The Cathedral of the Immaculate Conception in Albany, New York was the first church in the United States whose name at the time of the laying of its cornerstone referenced the Immaculate Conception, which occurred in July 1848. However, the cathedral was not dedicated until 1852. Likewise, the Church of the Immaculate Conception in Manhattan was dedicated in 1858 to the Immaculate Conception. At its dedication ceremony, Archbishop John Hughes stated that it was the first church to be dedicated to the Immaculate Conception since the papal pronouncement of the dogma, which occurred in 1854.)

In 1852, a school was established, and in 1855, the St. Mary's Cemetery was opened. Beginning in 1857, this school was staffed by nuns of the Sisters of Charity, who were later replaced by the Lasallian Christian Brothers in 1861.

== Architecture ==
Immaculate Conception was designed by Lawrence J. O'Connor in the Richardsonian Romanesque style. The main entrance is topped by a rounded arch supported by columns. It is built of rough-hewn brownstone and trimmed with red stone.

== See also ==
- Catholic Marian church buildings
- History of the Catholic Church in the United States
- List of churches in the Roman Catholic Archdiocese of New York
