= Immaculate Conception Church (Sparks, Nevada) =

Historic church in Nevada, United States

- U.S. National Register of Historic Places
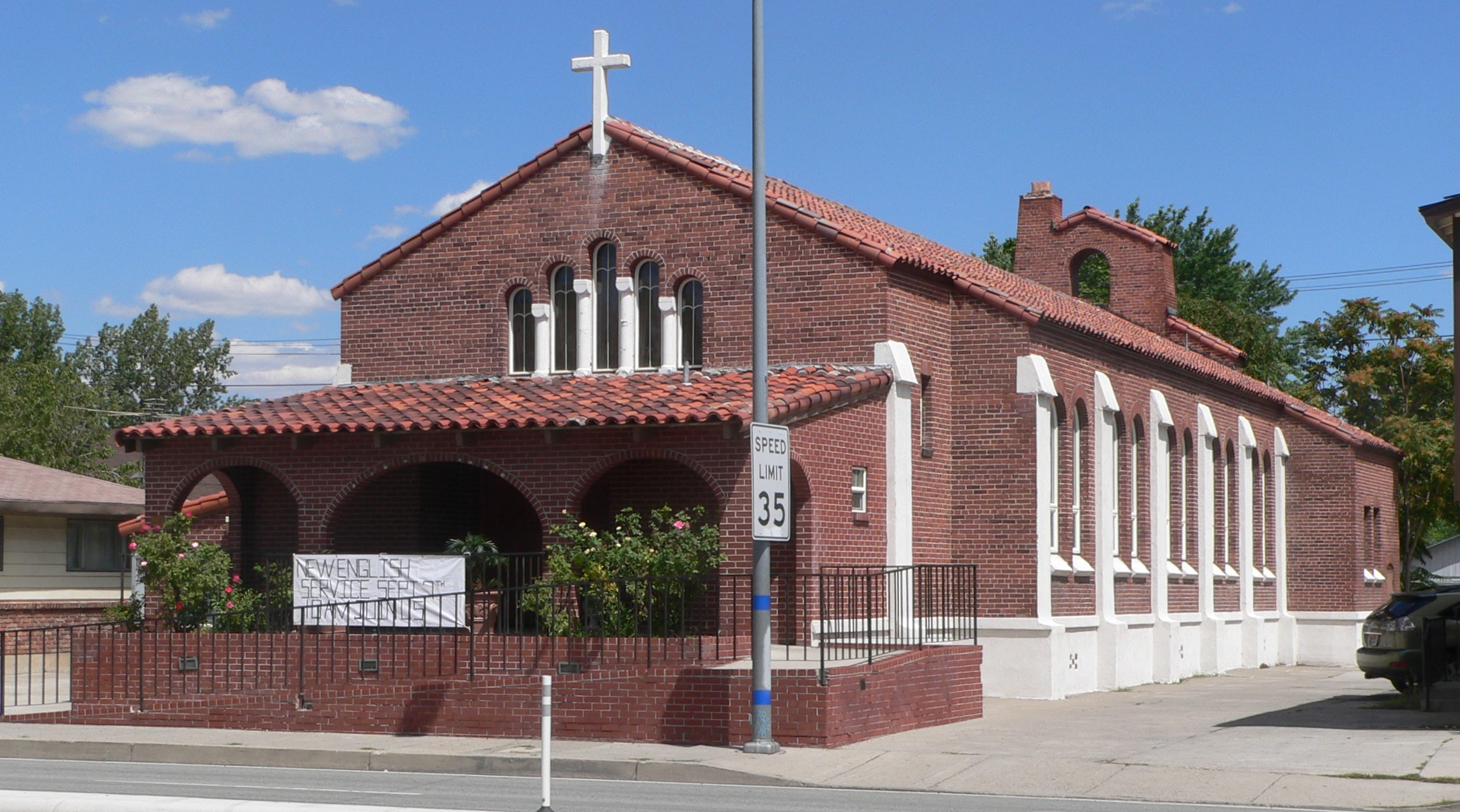
- View from southwest, across Pyramid Way

- Location within Nevada Location within the United States
- Location: 2900 McCarran Way, Sparks, Nevada
- Coordinates: 39°32′18.35″N 119°45′9.3″W
- Area: less than one acre
- Built: 1932
- Architect: DeLongchamps, Frederick J.
- Architectural style: Mediterranean Revival
- MPS: Architecture of Frederick J. DeLongchamps TR
- NRHP reference No.: 92001700
- Added to NRHP: December 23, 1992

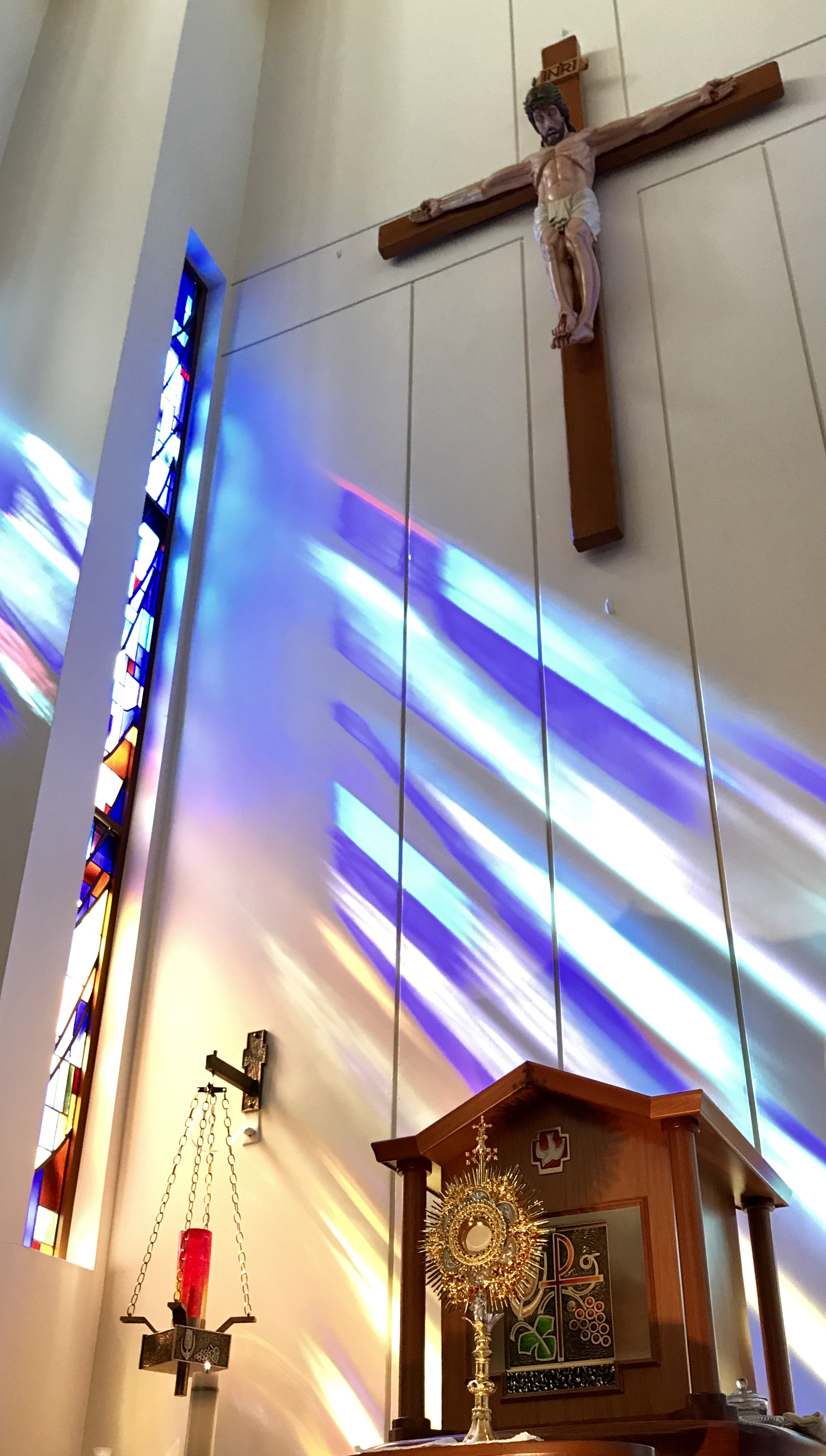
Immaculate Conception Catholic Church 2017

Immaculate Conception Catholic Church, is currently located at 2900 McCarran Way in Sparks, Nevada, United States. It is part of the Roman Catholic Diocese of Reno.

== History ==
The former location on Prater Way in Sparks, Nevada was a brick Roman Catholic church that was built in 1932 to replace an earlier church that was built in 1905 but destroyed by a fire in 1930. It was designed by prolific Nevada architect Frederic J. DeLongchamps (1882-1969) in Mediterranean Revival architecture.

It was used as a Catholic church as late as 2004 when construction on a larger building was completed and the parish moved to current location. When the older building on Prater Way, Sparks, Nevada was photographed in 2014, it was operating under the name "Iglesia Cristiana Monte Sinai".

The older church building on Prater Way was listed on the National Register of Historic Places in 1992. The building was deemed significant as the oldest surviving Catholic church in Sparks, as one of the first built in Nevada after the state became a diocese under 1931 decree of Pope Pius XI, and architecturally as a relatively rare use of Mediterranean Revival style in Nevada and "one of the many outstanding works" of DeLongchamps.

Its original form is "somewhat obscured" by a 1970 addition of a vestibule and porch on the front, added to provide handicapped access, but the addition was designed to be compatible architecturally.

The newer location had further construction in 2006 to build a Faith Foundation building in the east end of the parking lot. That construction was completed in 2007.

== Gallery ==
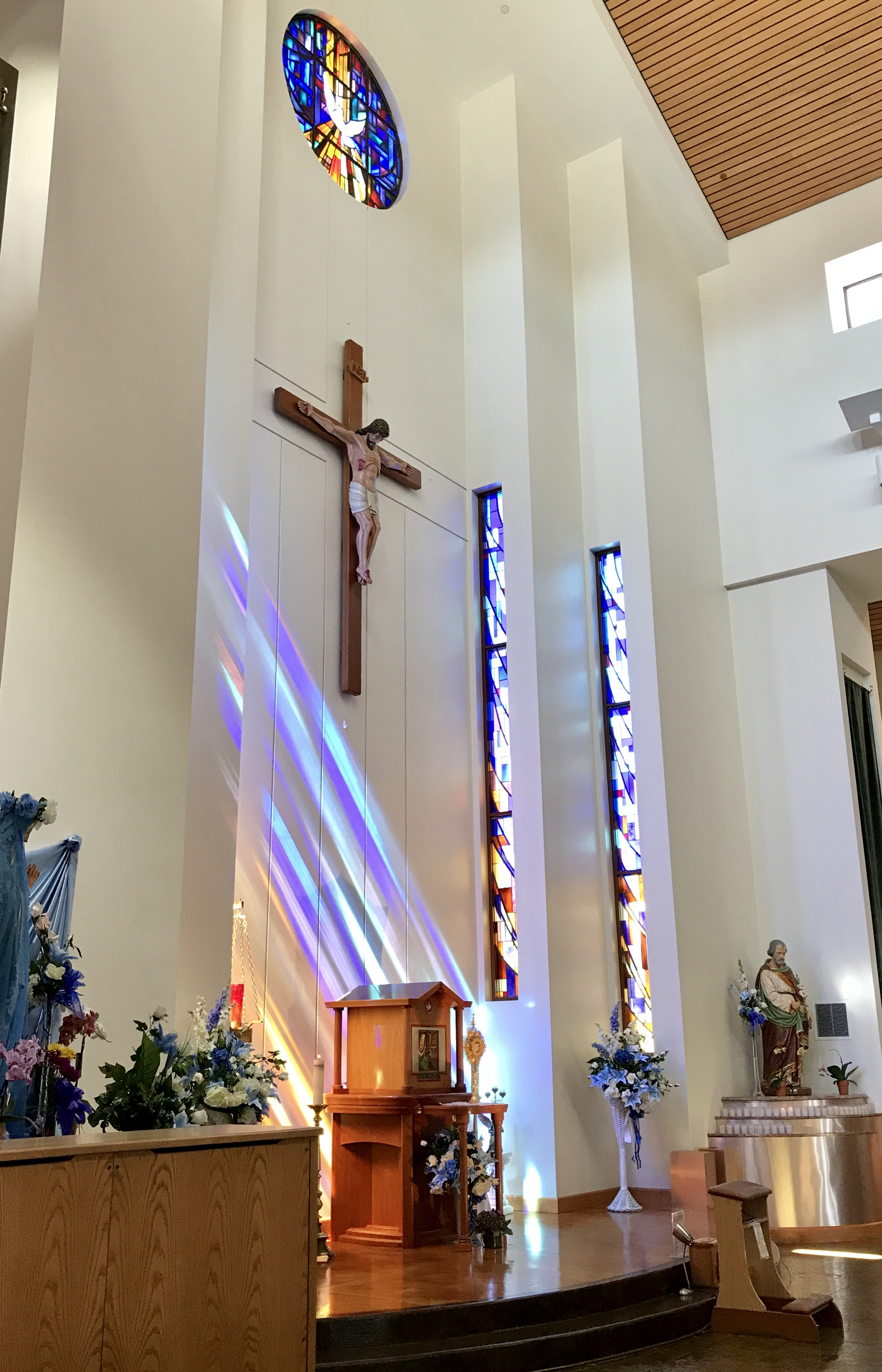
Interior of Immaculate Conception Catholic Church during eucharistic adoration

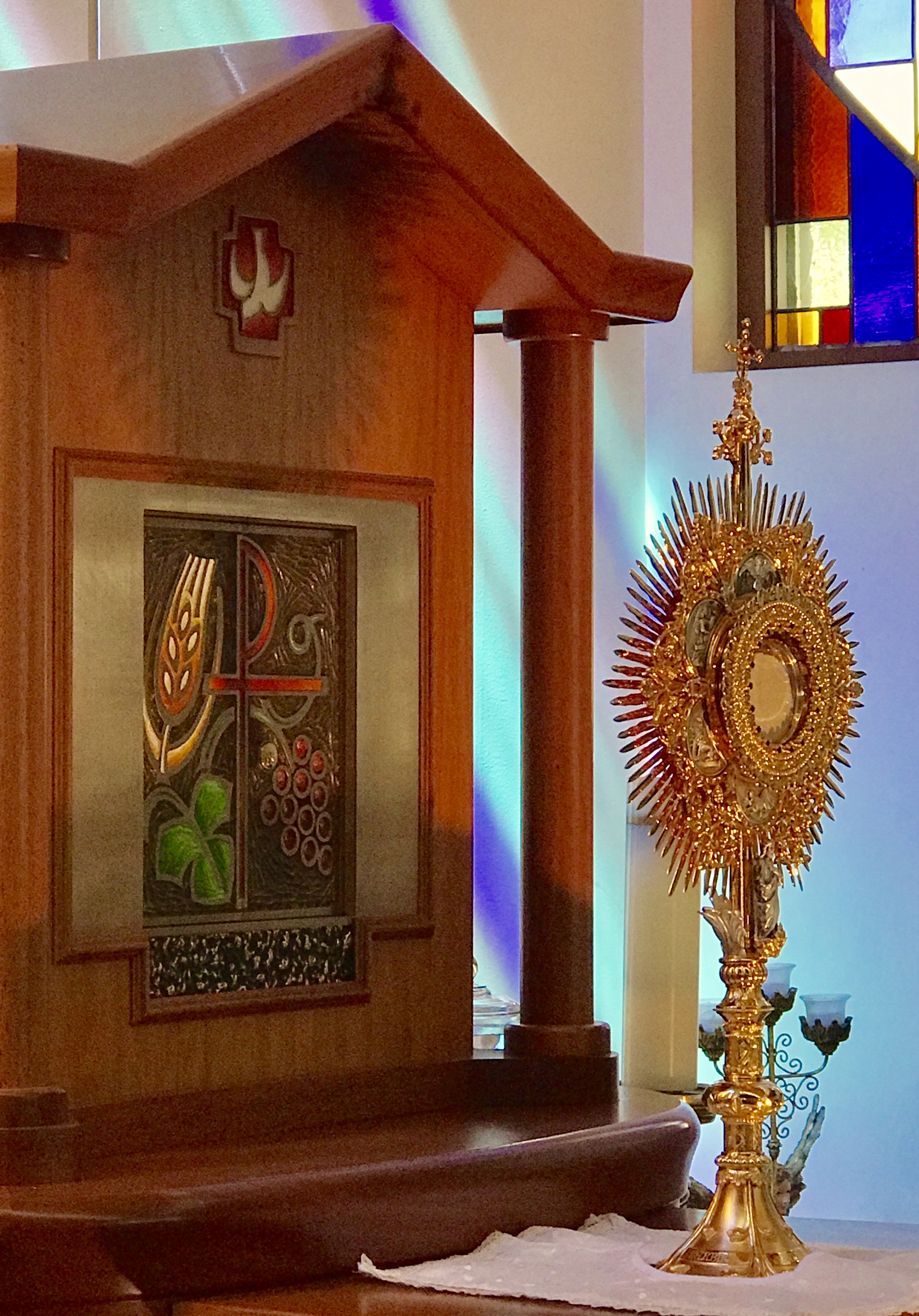
Detail of Immaculate Conception Catholic Church Sparks, Nevada tabernacle and eucharist adoration in a monstrance.

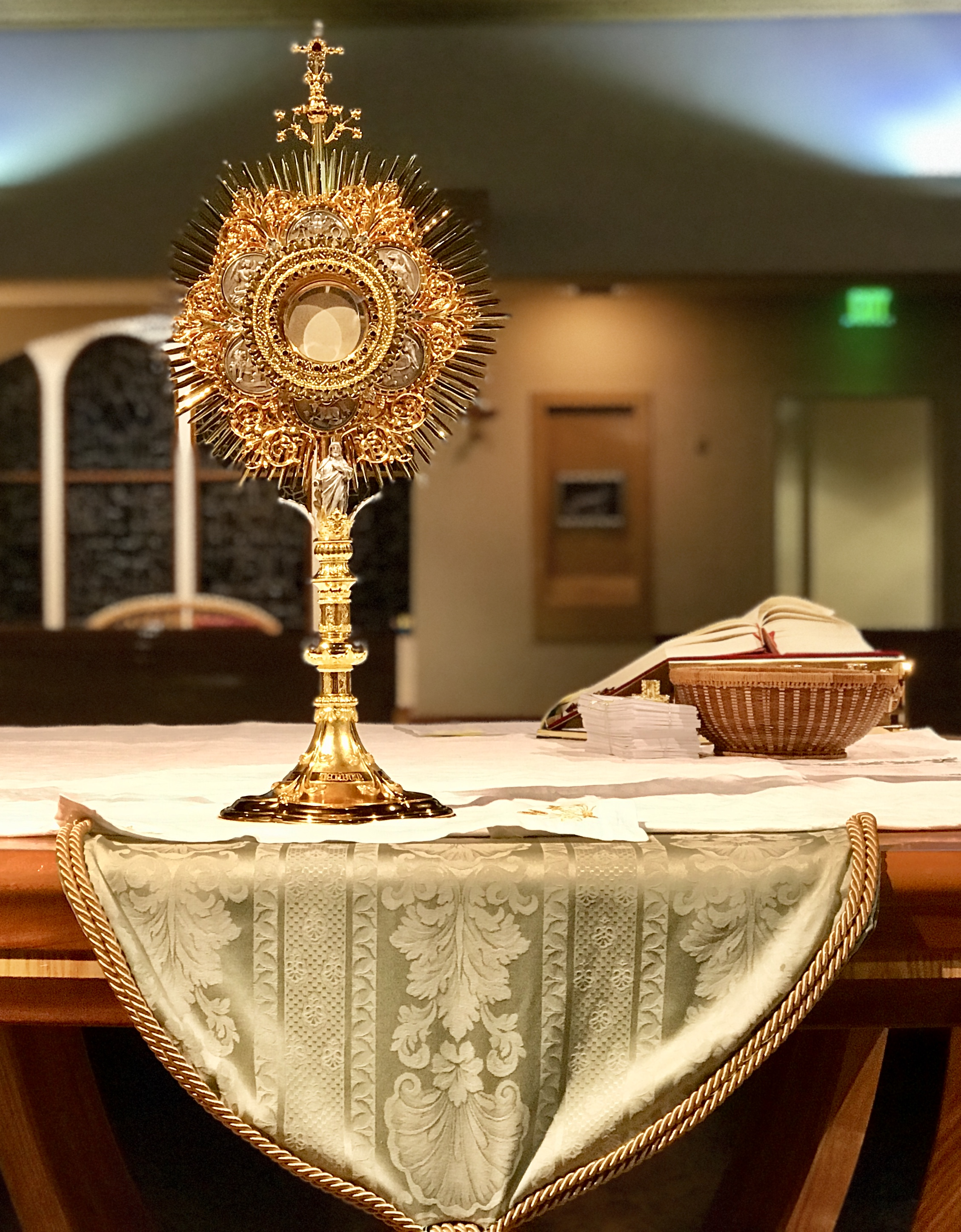
Eucharistic Adoration during Day of the Dead 2017

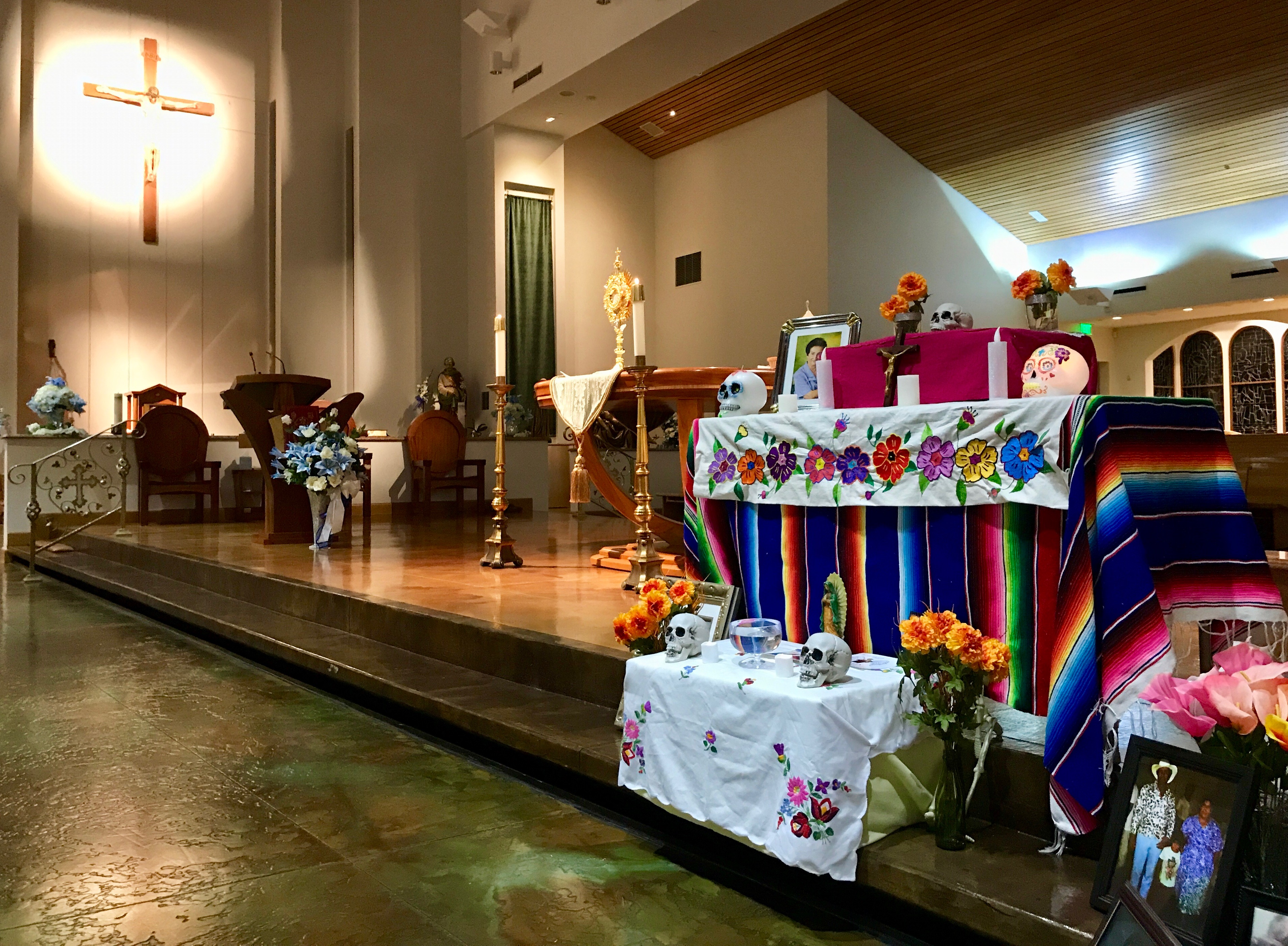
Day of the Dead 2017 - interior of Immaculate Conception Catholic Church Sparks Nevada

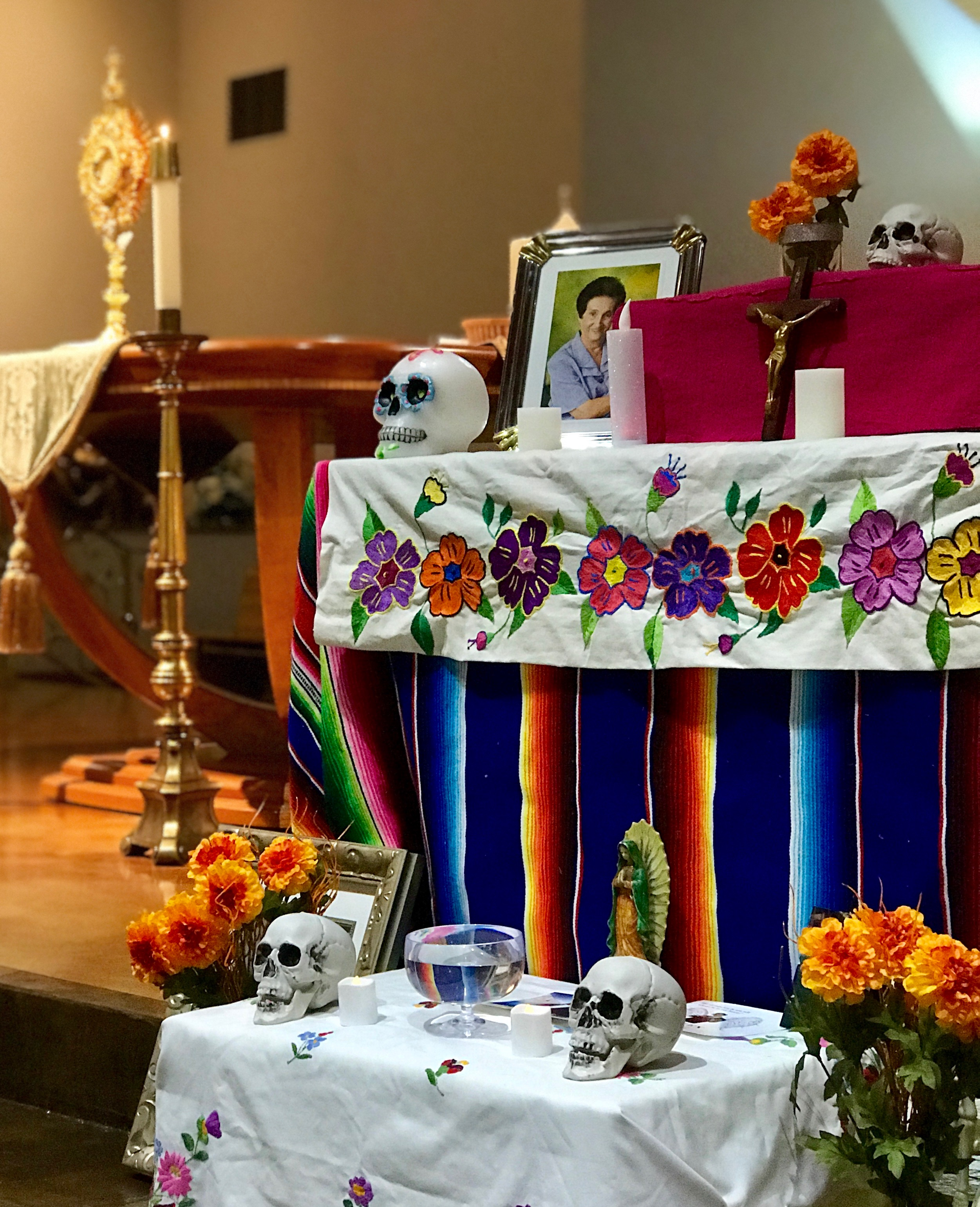
Detail of Day of the Dead 2017 at Immaculate Conception Catholic Church Sparks Nevada

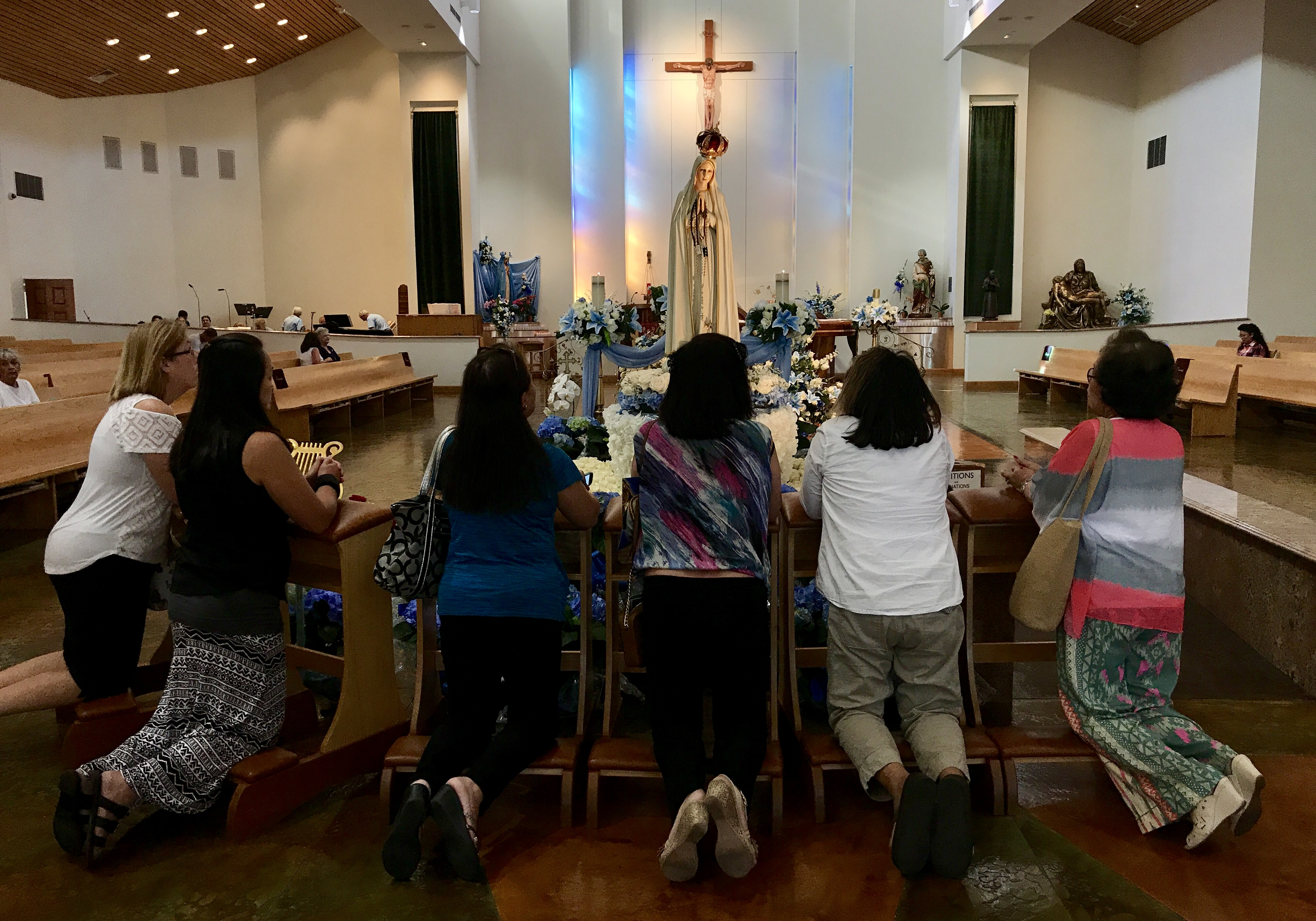
Praying during visit of Our Lady of Fatima

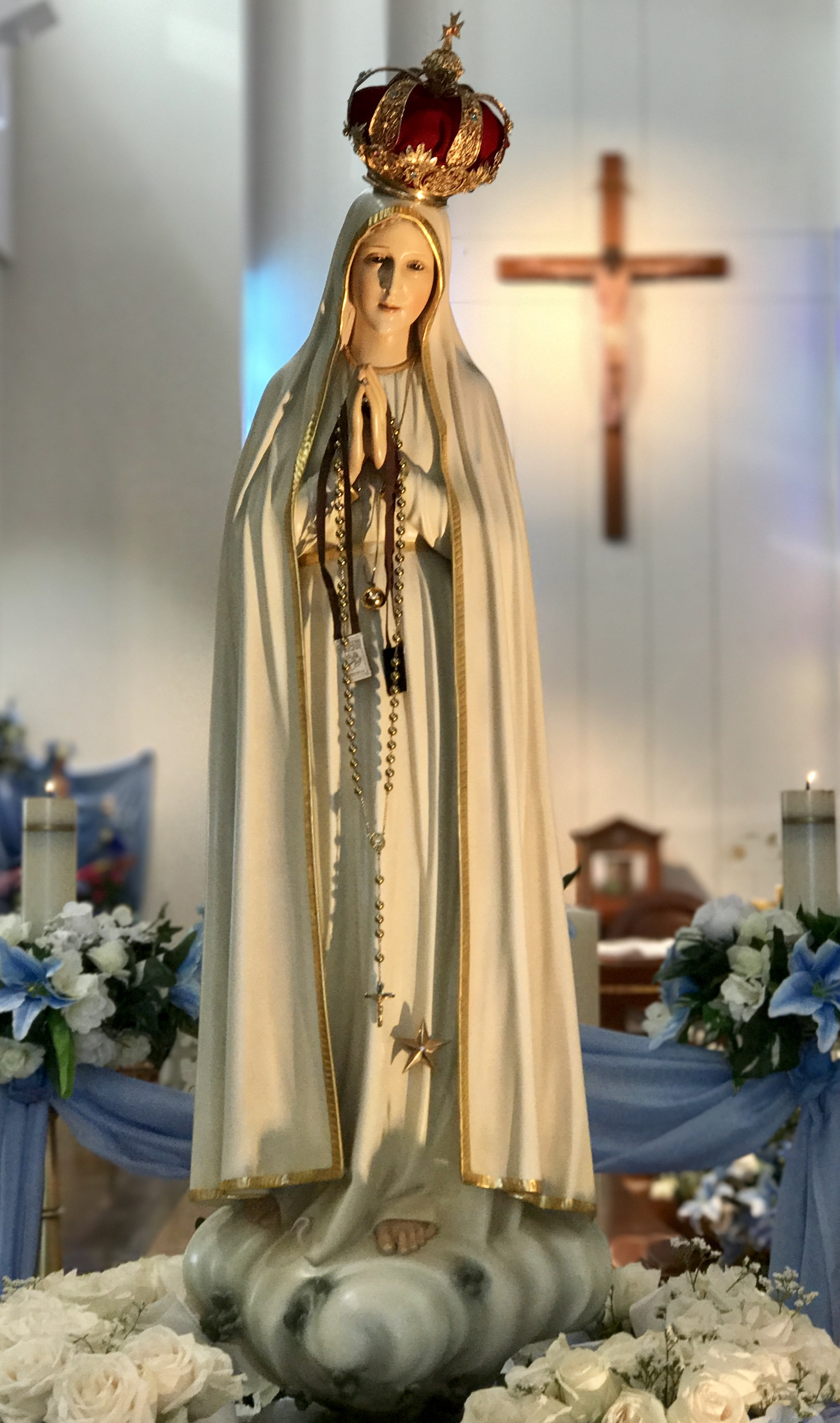
Our Lady of Fatima at Immaculate Conception Catholic Church Sparks Nevada

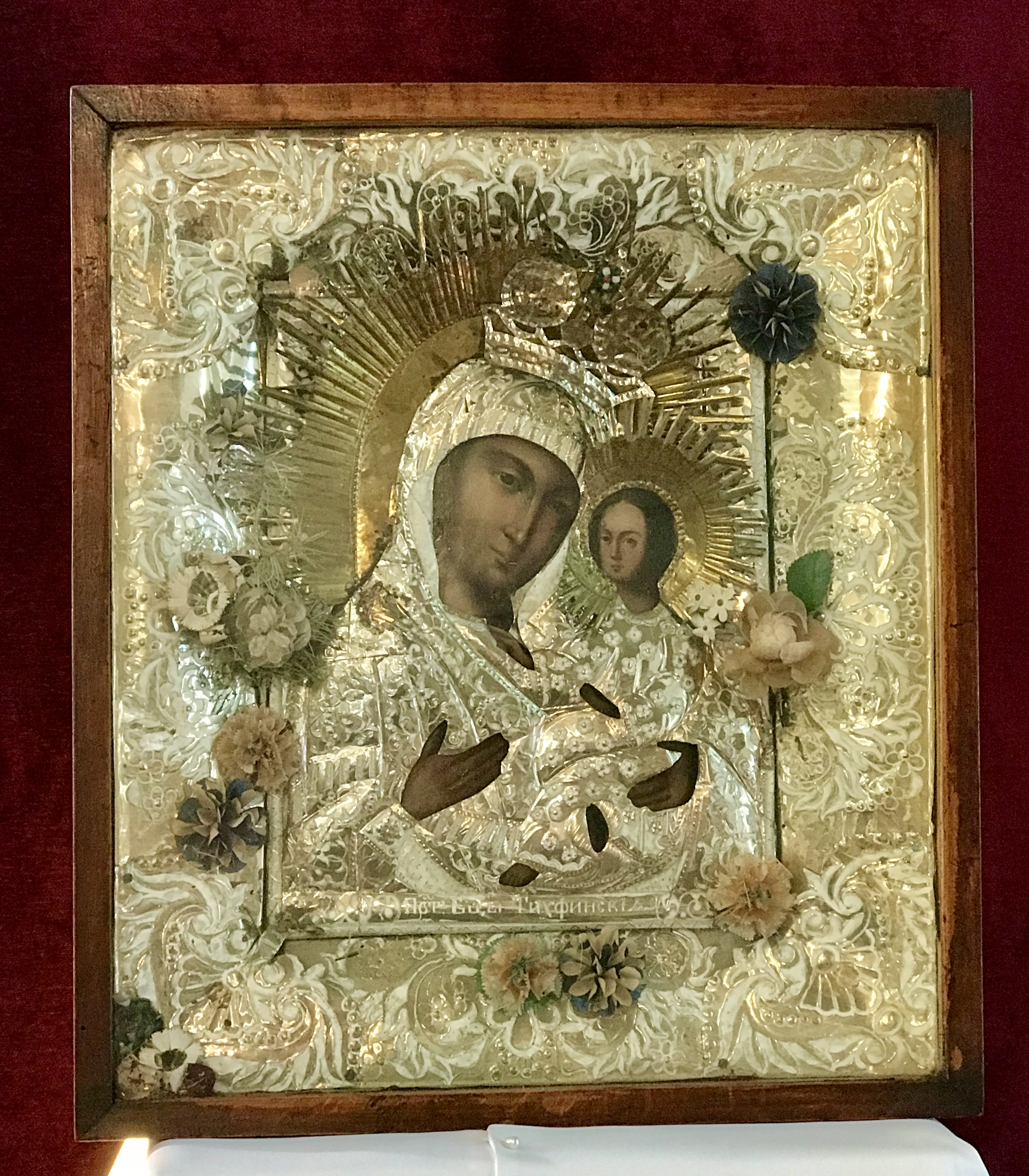
Icon of Thetokos of Tikhvin - Mother of God at Immaculate Conception Catholic Church Sparks Nevada
