= Church of the Immaculate Conception, Żurrieq =

Church of the Immaculate Conception
- Il-Knisja tal-Immakulata Kunċizzjoni
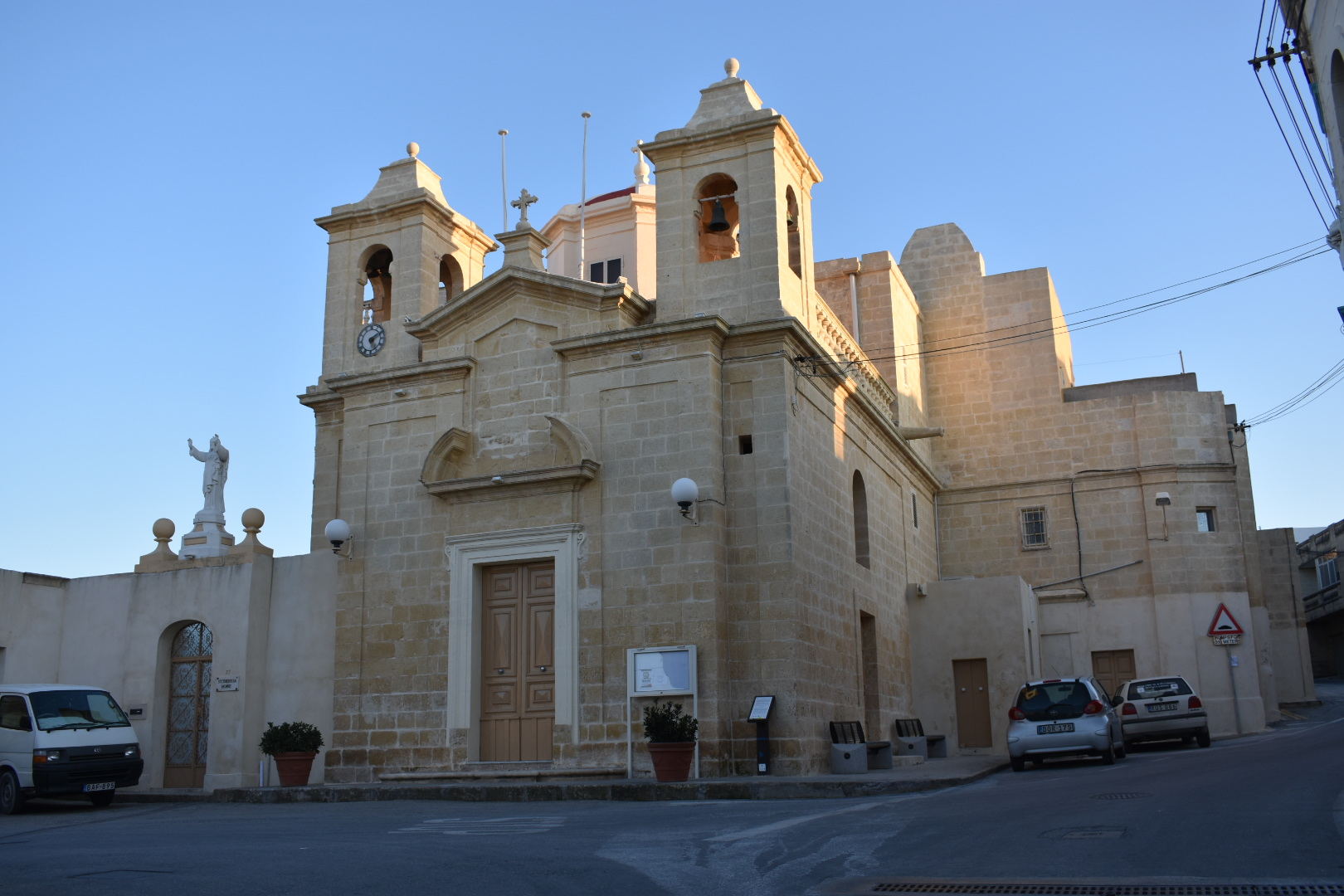

- 35°49′31.4″N 14°28′15.4″E
- Location: Żurrieq
- Country: Malta
- Denomination: Roman Catholic

History
- Status: Active
- Dedication: Immaculate Conception

Architecture
- Functional status: Church

Administration
- Archdiocese: Malta
- Parish: Żurrieq

Clergy
- Archbishop: Charles Scicluna

The Church of the Immaculate Conception is a Roman Catholic church located in the town of Żurrieq in Malta serving the area referred to as in-Nigret.

== History ==
The present church was built on the site of a previous chapel dedicated to the Annunciation which was deconsecrated by Bishop Miguel Juan Balaguer Camarasa on 24 November 1658. The church was built by commander James Togores de Valemuola and was finally consecrated by the parish priest of the village Reverend Karm Delicata on 11 October 1739. The chapel was built beside Togores Palace which was later converted into a monastery of nuns. The nuns manage and care for the church as well.

== Interior and exterior ==
The church has two bell towers and a dome. There are two altars with the titular painting depicting the Immaculate Conception with Saint James the Greater, Saint Leonard and Saint Lawrence dating from the 18th century.
