= Wanchin Basilica of the Immaculate Conception =

Church in Wanluan, Pingtung County, Taiwan

Basilica of the Immaculate Conception in Wanchin
- 萬 金 聖 母 聖 殿
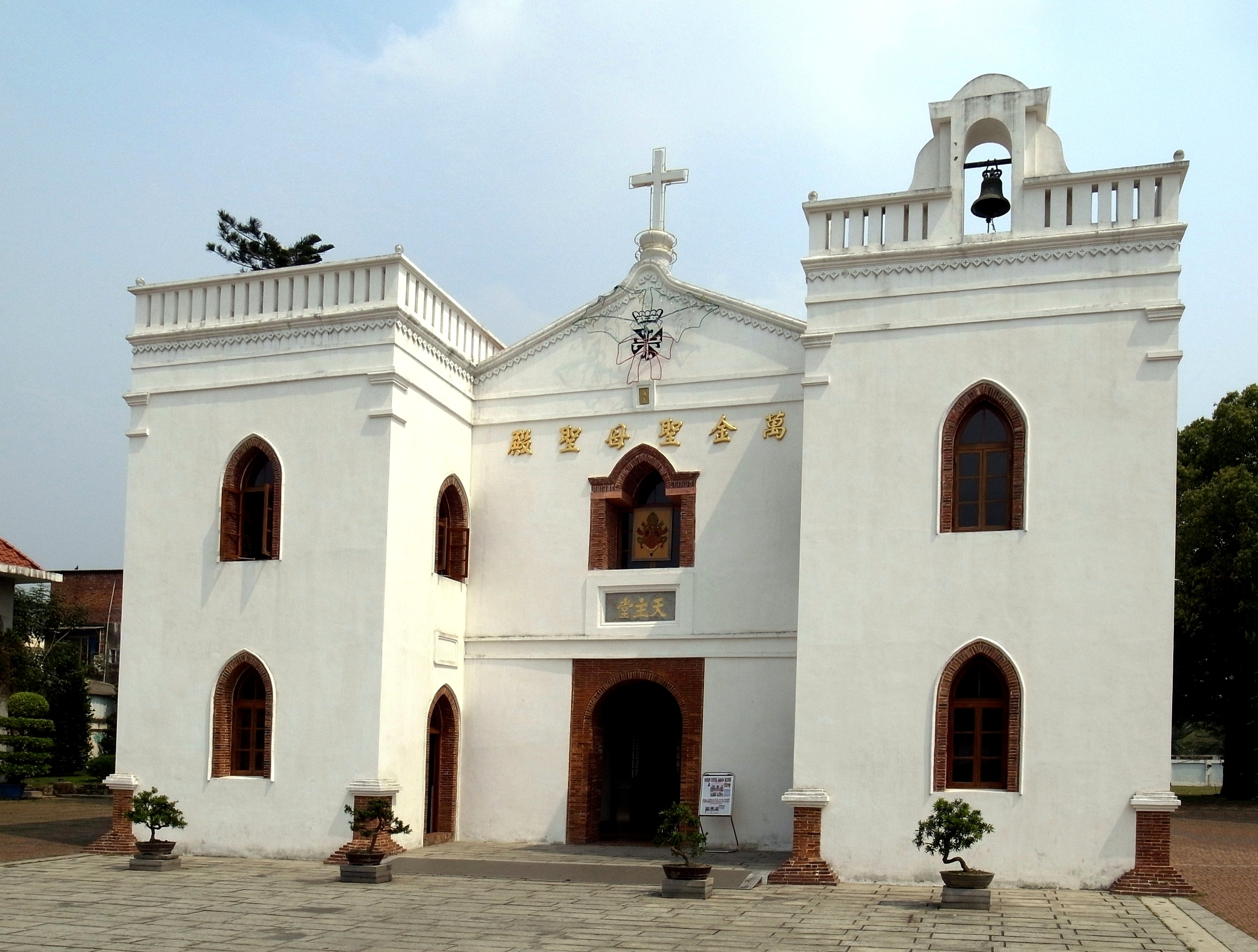
- Basilica of the Immaculate Conception in Wanchin
- 22°35′42.2″N 120°36′40.5″E
- Location: Wanluan, Pingtung County, Taiwan
- Denomination: Catholic Church

Architecture
- Architectural type: church
- Style: Spanish
- Completed: May 1863 (original building); 1870 (current building)

The Basilica of the Immaculate Conception in Wanchin (traditional Chinese: 萬金聖母聖殿; simplified Chinese: 万金圣母圣殿; pinyin: Wànjīn Shèngmǔ Shèngdiàn), is a Roman Catholic Minor Basilica in Pingtung County, Taiwan, Republic of China. The shrine is dedicated to the Blessed Virgin Mary of the Immaculate Conception.

Pope John Paul II raised the shrine to the status of a Minor Basilica via his Pontifical decree Qui Sanctos Cælites on 20 July 1984. The decree was signed and notarized by the former Vatican Secretary of State, Cardinal Agostino Casaroli. In 1985, the Holy Office designated it as a national shrine. It is the first basilica in Taiwan.

== History ==
Processional Marian image of the Basilica

=== Qing Dynasty ===
The Parish church in Wanchin was established by Catholic priest Father Fernando Sainz, who was affiliated with the Dominican Order. The church was originally constructed as a simple mud church in May 1863. On 13 October 1865, the church was heavily destroyed by an earthquake. It was then rebuilt with a bigger size and completed on 8 December 1870 when it was inaugurated.

=== Republic of China ===
The church underwent renovation in the 1950s and 1960s by different missionaries. On 20 July 1984, the church was conferred the title of basilica by Pope John Paul II, making it the first church in Taiwan to receive such title. In 1991, the Immaculate Conception Dominican Residence was built on the church ground. In 1994, an activity center was also built within the church area.

On 3 August 2016, the church was vandalized when a mentally ill man set a fire to a wooden statue of the Blessed Virgin Mary inside the building.

== Architecture ==
The current building of the church was built with Spanish fortress architecture.

The ground also houses the Dominican priory of the Immaculate Conception and a visitor center. The convents of Dominican cloistered nuns and missionary sisters are located nearby.

== See also ==
- List of tourist attractions in Taiwan
- Christianity in Taiwan
