= Church of Immaculate Conception =

Church in Haryana, India

Church of the Immaculate Conception
- चर्च ऑफ़ इमैक्युलेट कंसप्षन
- Location in Haryana Church of Immaculate Conception (India)

Religion
- Affiliation: Roman Catholic Church
- Region: Haryana
- Rite: Roman Rite
- Ecclesiastical or organizational status: Parish church
- Governing body: Archdiocese of Delhi
- Patron: Immaculate Conception of the Blessed Virgin Mary
- Year consecrated: 2001 (current church building)
- Status: Active

Location
- Location: Village Kanhei, Sector 45
- Municipality: Gurugram
- State: Haryana
- Country: India
- Interactive map of Church of the Immaculate Conception
- Administration: Roman Catholic Archdiocese of Delhi
- Coordinates: 28.4454°N 77.0722°E

Architecture
- Type: Church
- Established: 1930 (parish mission established)
- Completed: 2001 (current structure)

Website
- http://www.cicgurgaon.org/

Church of Immaculate Conception is a Roman Catholic Church situated in Kanhai, sector 45, Gurgaon, Haryana, India. This is the only Roman Catholic Church in Gurgaon.

The church mission was established by a capuchin friar in 1930 but the church building was constructed in year 2001 by efforts of Fr. Lourdusamy.

The church is under the jurisdiction of the Roman Catholic Archdiocese of Delhi. This is the only Latin Church in Gurgaon.
