= Church of the Immaculate Conception of the Blessed Virgin Mary, Warsaw =

Church in Warsaw, Poland

Coordinates: 52°13′10″N 20°58′58″E

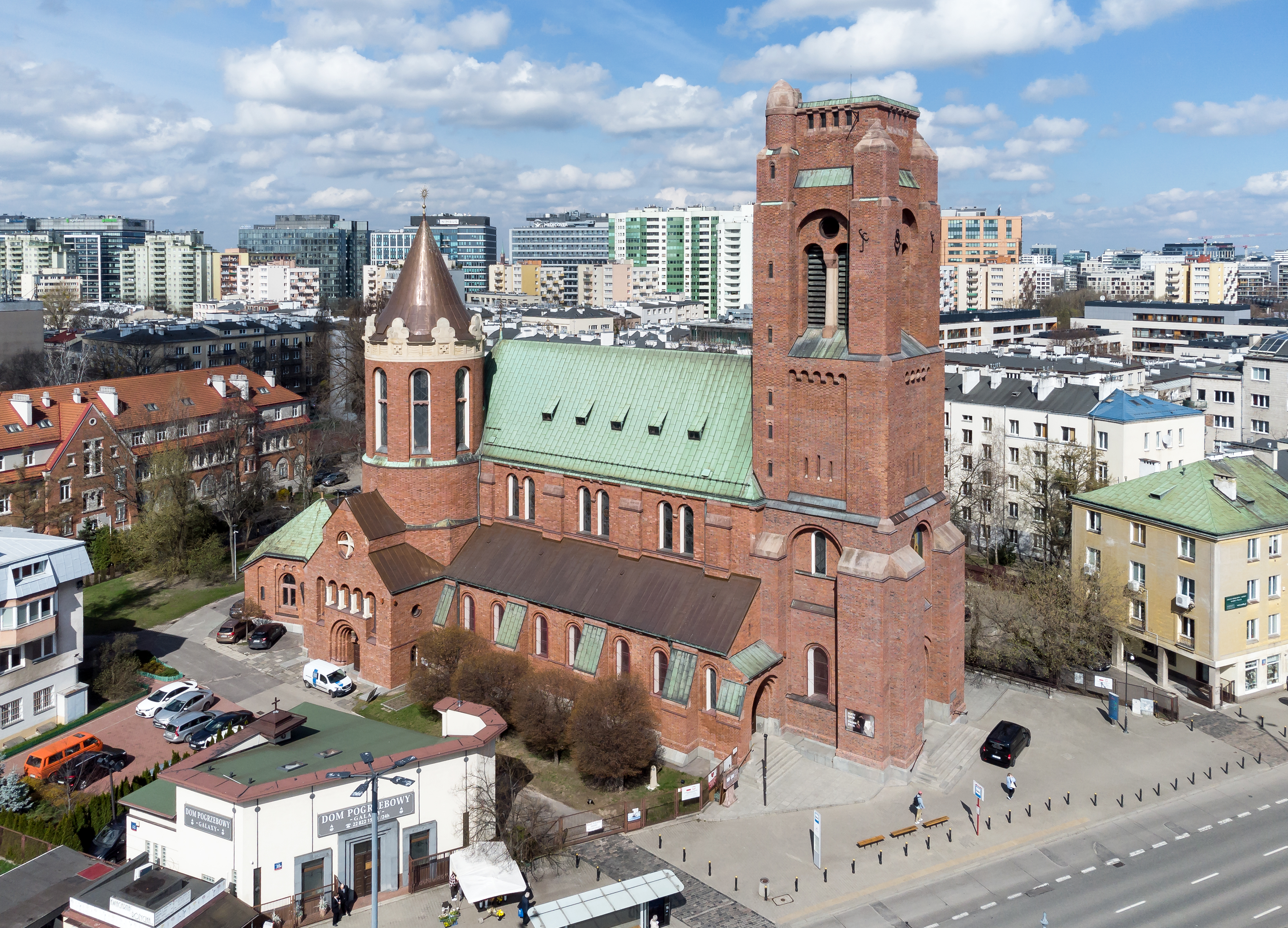
Church of the Immaculate Conception of the Blessed Virgin Mary in Warsaw.

The Church of the Immaculate Conception of the Blessed Virgin Mary (Polish: Kościół Niepokalanego Poczęcia Najświętszej Maryi Panny w Warszawie) is a church in Grójecka Street in the Ochota district of Warsaw, the capital city of Poland.

The church history dates back to 1669 with the first construction. Designed by architect Oskar Sosnowski, construction started in 1911 but was interrupted in 1914. Before construction resumed in 1927 the church hosted the parish of St James the Apostle.

The church sustained some damage during the siege of Warsaw in 1939, mainly to the Chapel of the Virgin Mary. Much heavier damage occurred during the Warsaw Uprising of 1944 and most of the building's contents were destroyed, including the roof and the stained glass windows designed by H Bardzińska. Reconstruction work began in 1946 and was largely complete by the end of the 1950s.
