= Immaculate Conception of the Blessed Virgin Mary Church (Bronx) =

Catholic parish church in New York, US

Coordinates: 40°49′1.9″N 73°55′4.7″W

The Church of the Immaculate Conception of the Blessed Virgin Mary
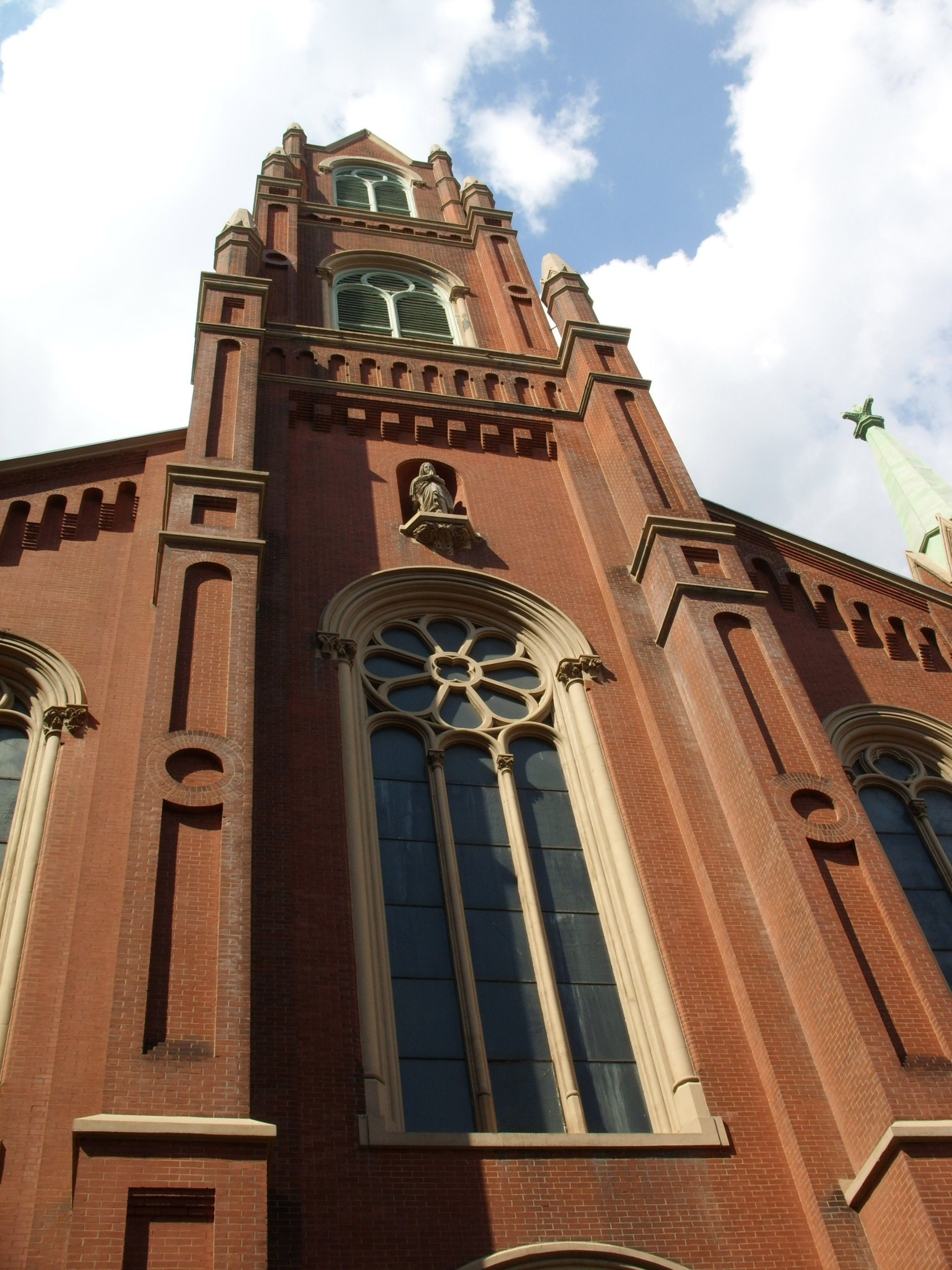
- Immaculate Conception Church East 150th Street
- Interactive map of the The Church of the Immaculate Conception of the Blessed Virgin Mary area

General information
- Architectural style: Romanesque Revival
- Location: Melrose, Bronx, New York City, United States of America
- Completed: 1887 (for church); 1901 (for school hall)
- Client: Roman Catholic Archdiocese of New York

Technical details
- Structural system: Brick masonry

Design and construction
- Architects: Henry Bruns (for 1887 church); Anthony F. A. Schmitt (for 1901 school hall)

Church of the Immaculate Conception of the Blessed Virgin Mary is a Roman Catholic parish church under the authority of the Roman Catholic Archdiocese of New York, located at 150th Street at Melrose Avenue, Bronx, New York City, in the Melrose neighborhood of the South Bronx. The parish was established in 1853. It is staffed by the Redemptorist Fathers. The church boasts the highest steeple in the Bronx.

== Building ==
The present Romanesque Revival brick church was completed in 1887 to the designs of Henry Bruns and is the highest steeple in the Bronx. The school hall was built 1901 to the designs by Anthony F. A. Schmitt. "Built in the days when Germans were the most populous ethnic group in the Bronx and their prominence in the building trades, brewing, and the manufacture of musical instruments was of central importance to the borough's prosperity."
