= Immaculata High School =

Immaculata High School may refer to:

- Immaculata Regional High School, in Kelowna, British Columbia, Canada
- Immaculata High School (Ottawa), in Ottawa, Ontario, Canada
- Immaculata High School (Chicago), in Chicago, Illinois, United States
- Immaculata High School (Kansas), in Leavenworth, Kansas, United States
- Immaculata High School (Marrero, Louisiana), in Marrero, Louisiana, United States
- Immaculata High School (Detroit, Michigan)
- Immaculata High School (New Jersey), in Somerville, New Jersey, United States
- Immaculata High School (Washington, D.C.), in the District of Columbia, United States

== See also ==
- Immaculata (disambiguation)
- Immaculate High School, Danbury, Connecticut, United States
