= Immaculata (disambiguation) =

Immaculata is a title of the Virgin Mary referring to the Catholic doctrine of the Immaculate Conception.

Immaculata may also refer to:

== Species of animals ==
- Deloneura immaculata, a species of butterfly endemic to South Africa
- Hyla immaculata, a species of frog endemic to China
- Hafferia immaculata, a species of antbird in South and Central America
- Platythelphusa immaculata, a species of freshwater crabs endemic to Lake Tanganyika
- Scutigerella immaculata, the garden centipede

== Schools and universities ==
- Immaculata University, a Catholic University in East Whiteland Township, Chester County, Pennsylvania
- Immaculata Regional High School, in Kelowna, British Columbia, Canada
- Immaculata High School (Ottawa), in Ottawa, Ontario, Canada
- Immaculata High School (Chicago), in Chicago, Illinois, United States
- Immaculata High School (Kansas), in Leavenworth, Kansas, United States
- Immaculata High School (Marrero, Louisiana), in Marrero, Louisiana, United States
- Immaculata High School (Detroit, Michigan)
- Immaculata High School (New Jersey), in Somerville, New Jersey, United States
- Immaculata High School (Washington, D.C.), in the District of Columbia, United States

== Other uses ==
- Immaculata (statue), a Baroque plague column in Košice, Slovakia
- Immaculata Church, a Roman Catholic church in Cincinnati, Ohio
- Immaculata prayer, a Roman Catholic prayer to Mary composed by Saint Maximillian Kolbe

== See also ==
- I. maculata (disambiguation)
- Immaculate Conception (disambiguation)
- Immacolata (disambiguation)
- Militia Immaculatae, a Catholic religious association
- Princess Maria Immaculata of Bourbon-Two Sicilies (disambiguation)
