= Immaculate (disambiguation) =

The Immaculate Conception is a dogma of the Catholic Church that states that the Virgin Mary was free of original sin from the moment of her conception.

Immaculate may also refer to:

== Arts, entertainment, media ==
=== Music ===
- Immaculate (album), a 2001 album by Mac Mall, or the title track
- "Immaculate", a song by Gabi DeMartino from Paintings of Me, 2022
- "Immaculate", a song by Shygirl and Saweetie from Club Shy Room 2, 2025
- "Immaculate", a song by Years & Years from Night Call, 2022
- The Immaculate, an album by Mac, 2009

=== Films ===
- Immaculate (1950 film), a Mexican drama film by Julio Bracho
- Immaculate (2021 film), a Romanian drama film
- Immaculate (2024 film), an American horror film

== Other uses ==
- MV Stena Immaculate, the tankership Immaculate of the Stena Line

== See also ==
- Immaculate Conception (disambiguation)
- Immaculata (disambiguation)
- Immacolata (disambiguation)
