= George Scratchley Brown =

United States Air Force general (1918–1978)

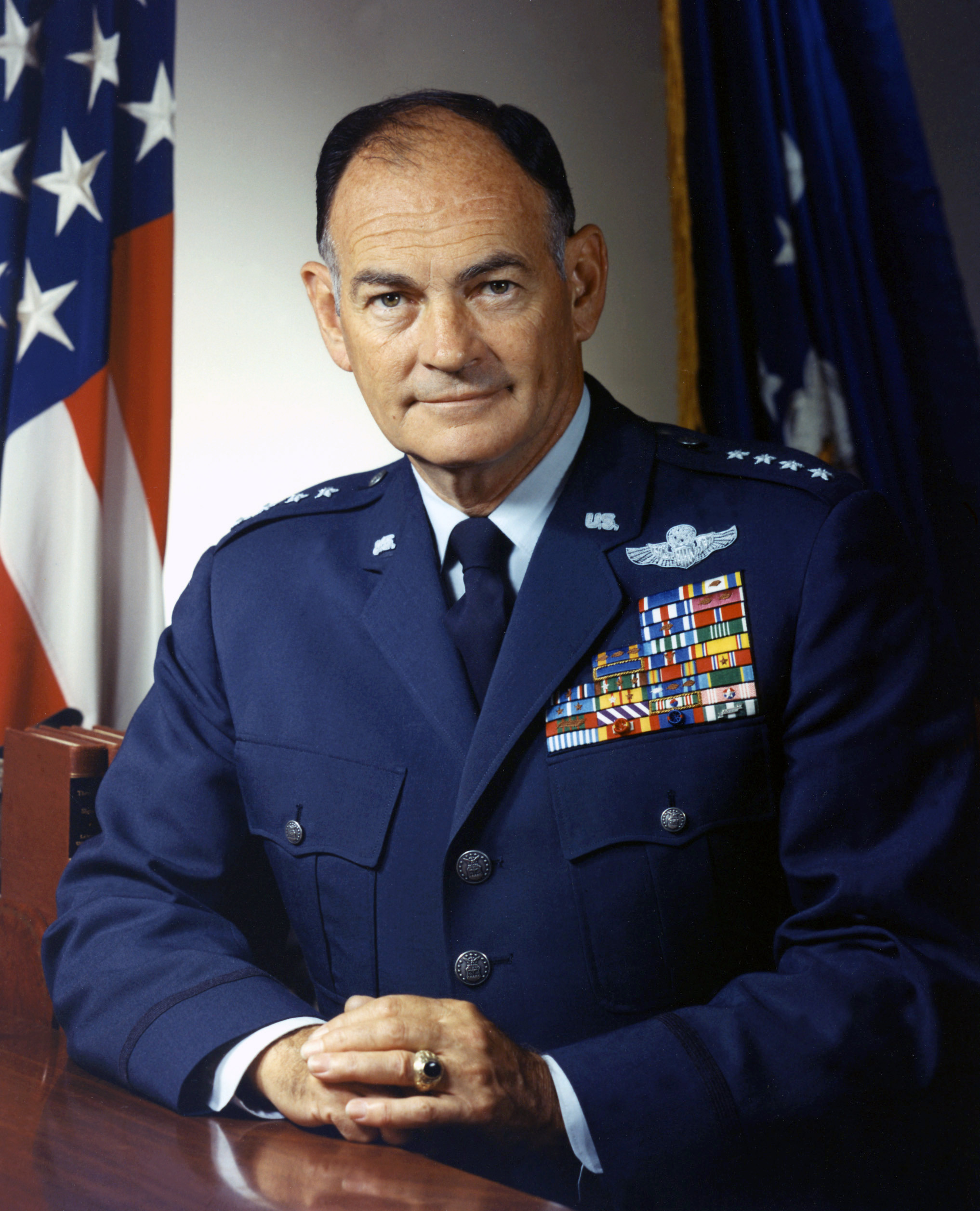
- Official portrait, 1974
- Born: 17 August 1918; Montclair, New Jersey, U.S.
- Died: 5 December 1978 (aged 60); Andrews Air Force Base, Maryland, U.S.
- Burial place: Arlington National Cemetery
- Military career
- Allegiance: United States
- Branch: United States Air Force
- Service years: 1941–1978
- Rank: General
- Service number: O-24021
- Commands: Chairman of the Joint Chiefs of Staff; Chief of Staff of the United States Air Force; Air Force Systems Command; Seventh Air Force; Eastern Transport Air Force; 3525th Pilot Training Wing; 56th Fighter-Interceptor Wing; 62d Troop Carrier Group
- Conflicts: World War II; Korean War; Vietnam War
- Awards: Distinguished Service Cross; Defense Distinguished Service Medal; Air Force Distinguished Service Medal (4); Navy Distinguished Service Medal; Silver Star; Legion of Merit (3); Distinguished Flying Cross (2); Bronze Star Medal; Air Medal (4); Croix de guerre (France); Distinguished Flying Cross (UK)

George Scratchley Brown (17 August 1918 – 5 December 1978) was a United States Air Force general who served as the eighth Chief of Staff of the Air Force from 1973 to 1974 and the eighth Chairman of the Joint Chiefs of Staff from 1974 to 1978. In this capacity, he served as the senior military adviser to the president of the United States, the National Security Council and the secretary of defense. Through the commanders of the unified and specified commands, he was also responsible for executing the decisions of the National Command Authorities regarding worldwide readiness and employment of combat forces of the United States Army, Navy, Air Force and Marine Corps. A graduate of the University of Missouri, he initially served in the Missouri National Guard during the interwar period, he later joined the US Army Air Corps following the attack on Pearl Harbor and the beginning of American involvement in the Second World War.

During his career as a pilot with the Eighth Air Force in Europe, Brown would become highly decorated officer and served in operational and command roles, earning the Distinguished Flying Cross. He later became a fighter pilot and served with distinction in the Korean War, before going on to serve in the Joint Staff as an aide to one of his future predecessors, General Earle Wheeler and later command the Seventh Air Force in the Vietnam War, playing a central role in Operation Rolling Thunder. After the 1968 Tet Offensive, he became deputy commander for operations of Military Assistance Command Vietnam and worked closely with General Creighton Abrams, the successor to General William Westmoreland. Brown played a key role in the highly controversial and destructive air campaign over Cambodia during the American intervention in its ongoing civil war ordered by President Richard Nixon, including Operation Menu and Operation Freedom Deal, which targeted North Vietnamese and Viet Cong sanctuaries on the border region.

After returning home in 1970, he initially led Air Force Systems Command, but his reputation among the national military leadership at the Pentagon led to him being nominated as Air Force Chief of Staff, and later Chairman of the Joint Chiefs, facing the reduction of American military involvement in Southeast Asia, helping the evacuation of Saigon before the eventual collapse of the Republic of Vietnam, and force modernization. During the presidency of Jimmy Carter, he supported the development of the B-1 bomber and advised him on the Strategic Arms Limitation Talks with the Soviet Union, as Detente progressed, still favoring a strong nuclear deterrent to prevent any future aggression, and also dealing with the future handover of the Panama Canal and the ongoing conflict with North Korea at the Demilitarized Zone.

== Early life ==
George Scratchley Brown was born in Montclair, New Jersey, on 17 August 1918, the son of Thoburn Kaye Brown, an Army officer who had graduated with the West Point class of 1913, and his wife Frances Katherine née Scratchley. As an Army brat, Brown lived in a succession of different towns and military bases. He was an Eagle Scout, and played on the American football varsity team as a freshman at Fort Brown, Texas. He later was a fullback during his junior and senior years at Immaculata High School in Fort Leavenworth, Kansas, and was an all-league in the Catholic high school interstate league.

Both Brown and his younger brother Tim set their sights on attending West Point, but their father advised taking a year of college first. Therefore, after graduating from high school in 1936, Brown enrolled in engineering at the University of Missouri where he joined Sigma Alpha Epsilon. A fine horseman, he played polo. He also enlisted in the 128th Field Artillery Battalion of the Missouri National Guard, rising to the rank of corporal. His father was able to secure a congressional appointment to the United States Military Academy from Kansas for him, and Brown entered on 1 July 1937.

At West Point, Brown was roommates with John Norton, future US Army lieutenant general. Brown once again played polo, and was captain of the team in his senior year, when the West Point team lost in the final to Princeton University. In that year he was also cadet captain and regimental adjutant. He would have liked to have joined the cavalry on graduation like his father, but his standing as 342nd in his class was too low for an appointment to the cavalry. Instead, he was commissioned as a second lieutenant in the infantry on graduation on 11 June 1941. However, he volunteered for Air Corps training. At West Point he met Alice (Skip) Colhoun. An Army brat like himself, Alice met Brown at a party her father had thrown for the sons of the graduates of the class of 1913. Brown and Alice dated for over a year, and were married in 1942. Their marriage produced three children, two boys and a girl.

== World War II ==
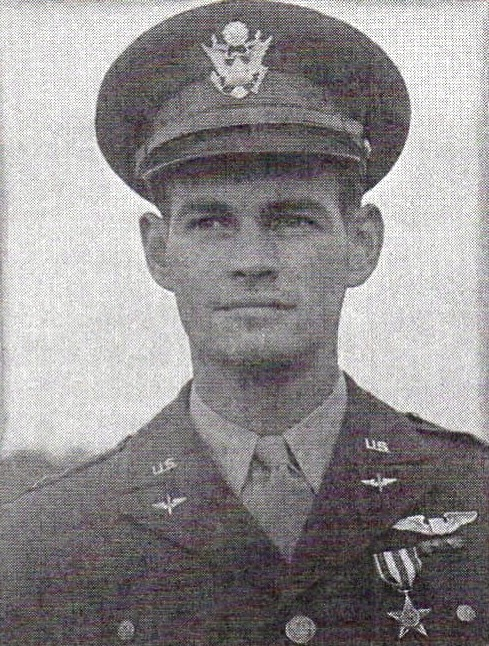
Major George S. Brown during World War II in 1943.

Brown commenced his basic flight training in Fairchild PT-19s at Pine Bluff, Arkansas on 20 August 1941. He then went to Randolph Field, Texas, for the second phase of his training. The third and final phase was completed at Kelly Field, Texas, where he received his pilot's wings on 7 March 1942. He officially transferred to the Air Corps on 4 April 1942, and was promoted to first lieutenant on 18 June 1942. His first assignment after flight training was at Barksdale Field, Louisiana, where, as a member of the 344th Bombardment Squadron of the 93d Bombardment Group, he flew the Consolidated B-24 Liberator. Moving with the organization to Fort Myers, Florida, he flew both antisubmarine patrol and conventional bomber training aircraft.

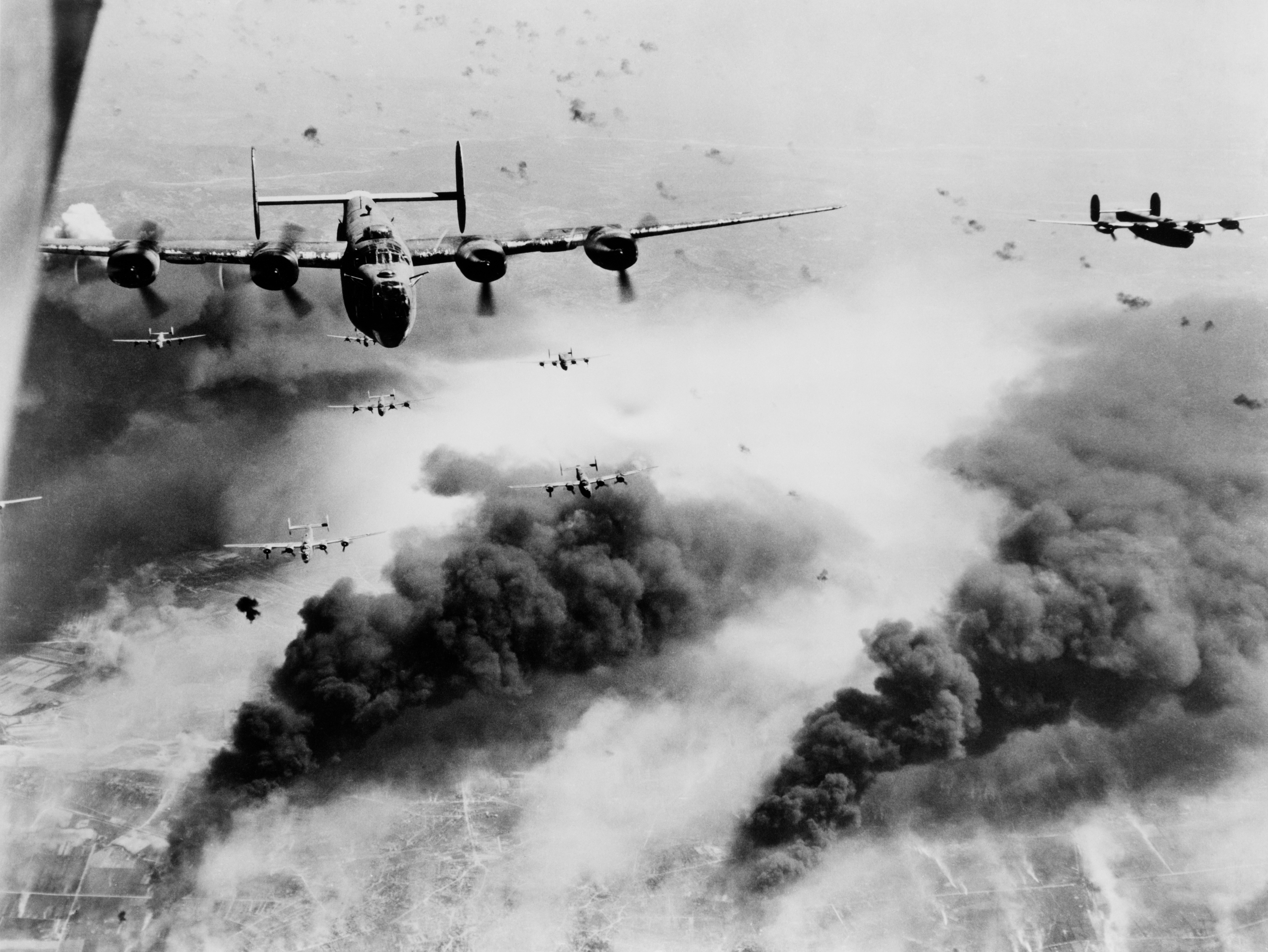
B-24s leaving Ploiești through flak and smoke

In August 1942, he flew with the 93d Bombardment Group to England, where it became the first B-24 group to join the Eighth Air Force. He served in various positions with the group, including commander of the 329th Bombardment Squadron, group operations officer and group executive officer. He was promoted to captain on 20 October, major on 13 February 1943, and lieutenant colonel on 27 August 1943. High casualties and the rapid expansion of the Air Force paved the way for fast promotion, which Brown's superiors felt was deserved due to his outstanding performance in combat and leadership skills. Perhaps no one was as surprised at his rapid advance in rank as his father, now a brigadier general, who was serving in North Africa at the time Brown arrived there with the 93d Bombardment Group when it was temporarily detached from the Eighth Air Force. The elder Brown wanted to know "What's a young whippersnapper like you doing as a colonel?!"

It was as executive officer that he took part in Operation Tidal Wave, the low-level bombing raid against oil refineries at Ploieşti, Romania, on 1 August 1943. The 93d Bombardment Group was the second of five B-24 groups that raided Ploieşti from a temporary base at Benghazi, Libya. It flew directly into heavy defenses to attack three of the six target refineries. The lead plane, flown by the group commander, Lieutenant Colonel Addison Baker, was shot down. Brown took over the command of the battered 93d and led it through the attack on the target and the journey back to Benghazi. He received the Distinguished Service Cross for his actions on that mission. For his services in combat in the skies over Europe, he was also awarded the Silver Star, two Distinguished Flying Crosses, three Air Medals, the French Croix de guerre with palm and the British Distinguished Flying Cross.

Brown was appointed assistant operations officer, 2d Air Division on 8 April 1944. He was promoted to colonel on 1 October. Having completed the required 25 missions, he was rotated back to the United States on 9 November. Alice was shocked to discover "that guy of mine had in fact requested another overseas assignment. He was so gung ho that he had come home, checked on me, and without my knowing it, put in to go back for another tour." However, the Air Force turned down the request. On 27 January 1945, Brown became Deputy Assistant Chief of Staff A-3 with the Air Training Command at Fort Worth, Texas.

== Cold War and later career ==
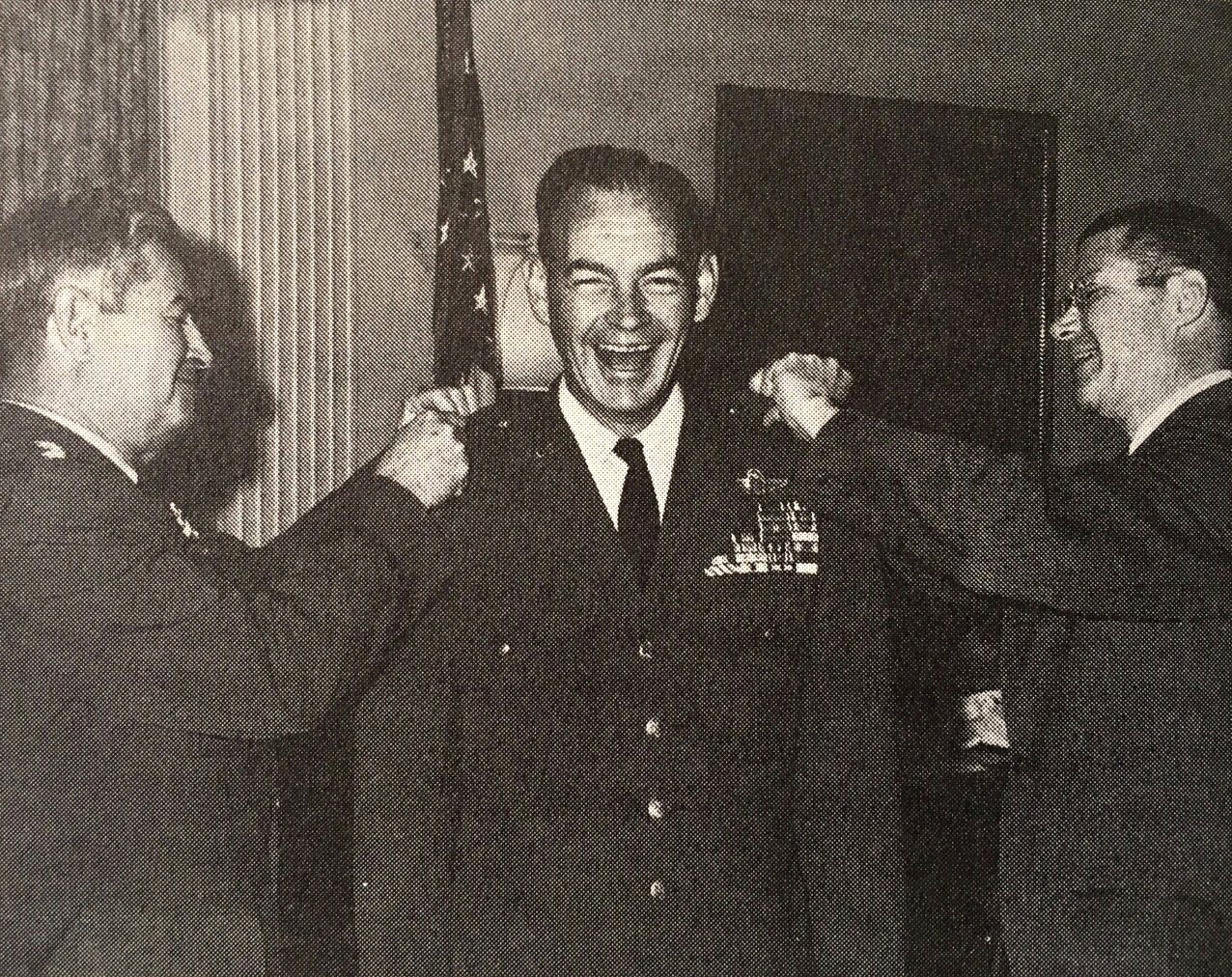
Brown upon receiving his first star as Brigadier General, pinned by Air Force Chief of Staff General Curtis LeMay and Secretary of Defense Robert McNamara.

In February 1946, Brown was posted to the Operations Division of the Air Training Command at Barksdale Field, Louisiana, where he served under Major General Alvin C. Kincaid and his Assistant Chief of Staff for Operations, Brigadier General Thomas C. Darcy. For the first time, Brown received a mediocre effectiveness report. In December 1946 he joined Headquarters Air Defense Command at Mitchel Field, New York, as assistant to Air Chief of Staff, Operations, and later as chief of its ROTC branch. On 1 July 1947 he became assistant deputy for operations.

Brown became commander of the 62d Troop Carrier Group at McChord Air Force Base, Washington, on 17 July 1950. This group operated Douglas C-124 Globemaster II and Fairchild C-119 Flying Boxcar aircraft between the West Coast and Japan. With the outbreak of the Korean War in June 1950, this mission acquired great importance. In July 1951 he assumed command of the 56th Fighter Interceptor Wing at Selfridge Air Force Base, Michigan, part of the Air Defense Command, although he had never flown fighters before. He learned to fly the Lockheed T-33 Shooting Star, North American F-86 Sabre and Lockheed F-94 Starfire. On 1 January 1952 Brown became assistant director of operations of the Fifth Air Force in South Korea. He became Director on 15 July 1952.

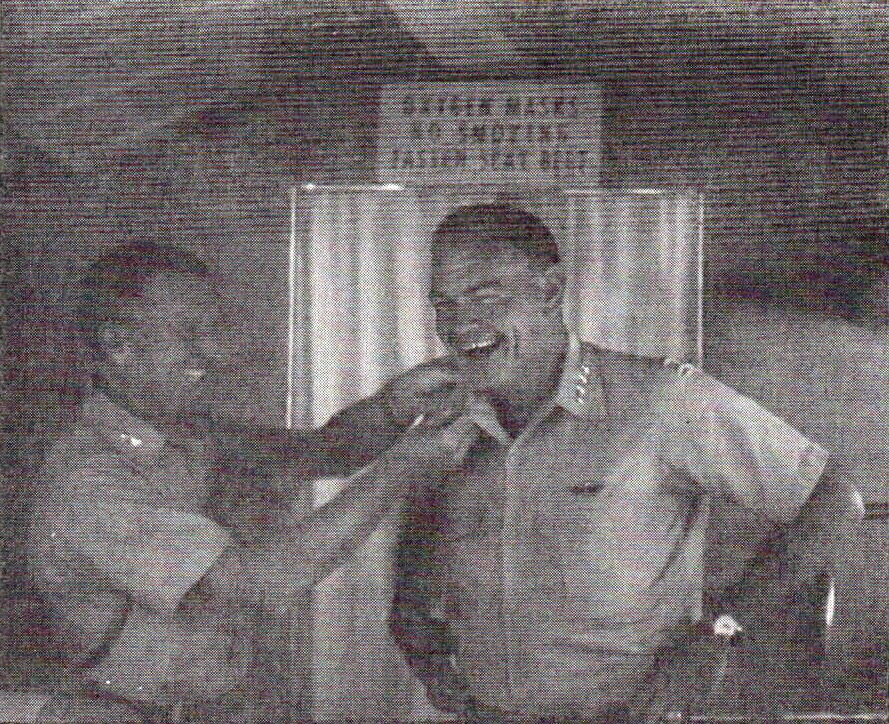
Brown received his fourth star, pinned by Air Force Vice Chief of Staff General Bruce K. Holloway on board the Boeing C-135 Speckled Trout, en route to South Vietnam in January 1968.

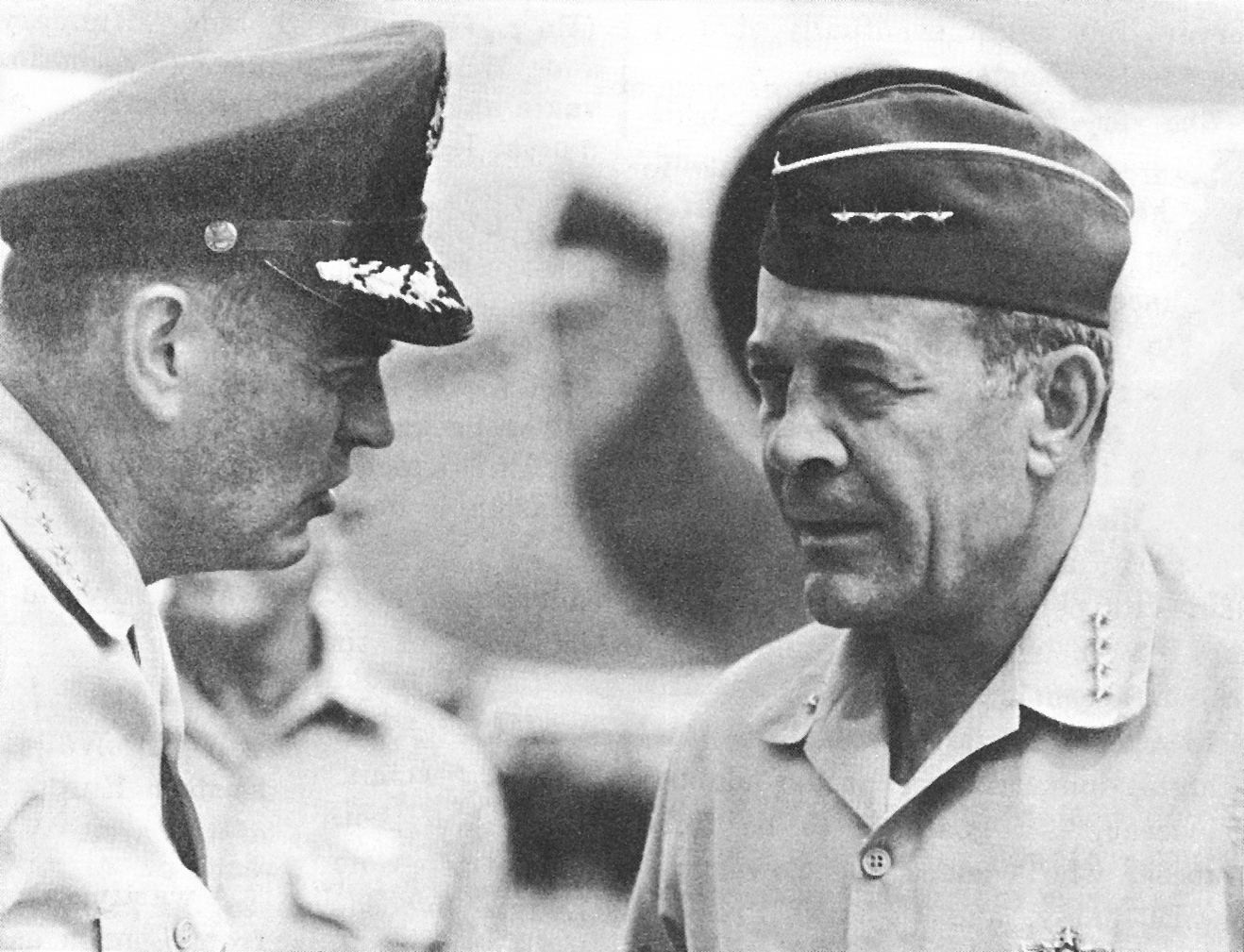
Brown during his tenure as Seventh Air Force Commander with Pacific Air Forces Commander General Joseph J. Nazzaro.

Brown returned to the United States where he assumed command of the 3525th Pilot Training Wing at Williams Air Force Base, Arizona, on 6 June 1953. He entered the National War College in August 1956. It was the first and only service school he attended after graduating from West Point. After graduation in June 1957, he served as executive to the Chief of Staff of the United States Air Force, General Thomas D. White. Brown was promoted to brigadier general in August 1959. He was selected to be military assistant to the Secretary of Defense, Thomas S. Gates Jr., and then to the new Secretary of Defense, Robert MacNamara, with the rank of major general.

Brown became commander of the Eastern Transport Air Force at McGuire Air Force Base, New Jersey, in August 1963. In September 1964, he was selected to organize and command Joint Task Force 2, a Joint Chiefs of Staff unit formed at Sandia Base, New Mexico, to the test weapon systems of all the military services in order to avoid wasteful duplication of effort. It was staffed by personnel of all three services. In May 1966 he became the Assistant to the Chairman of the Joint Chiefs of Staff, General Earle G. Wheeler, on the recommendation of his predecessor in the role, Lieutenant General Andrew Goodpaster. Brown was promoted to the same rank on 1 August 1966. The preoccupation of the Joint Chiefs at this time was the Vietnam War, but he was also involved in the handling of the Pueblo crisis.

On 1 August 1968, Brown assumed command of the Seventh Air Force and also became deputy commander for air operations, U.S. Military Assistance Command Vietnam (MACV), with the rank of general. As Seventh Air Force commander, he was responsible for all Air Force combat air strike, air support and air defense operations in Southeast Asia. In his MACV position, he advised on all matters pertaining to tactical air support and coordinated the Republic of Vietnam and United States air operations in the MACV area of responsibility. According to Goodpaster, Brown and MACV commander General Creighton Abrams "were like two brothers". General George F. Keegan felt that:

[Brown's] relationship with General Abrams was the finest between a ground theater commander and his air subordinate that I have seen since 1941. There was complete trust, rapport, an end to gamesmanship between one service and another. It was clear from the outset that Abrams understood finally that in George Brown he had a personal friend whose life and resources were wholly committed to fulfilling the theater job and responsibility that Abrams had upon his shoulders.

Brown's tour of Vietnam ended in September 1970, and he became Commander, Air Force Systems Command, with headquarters at Andrews Air Force Base, Maryland. This job involved handling a number of troublesome projects, including the F-111.

== Chief of Staff of the United States Air Force ==
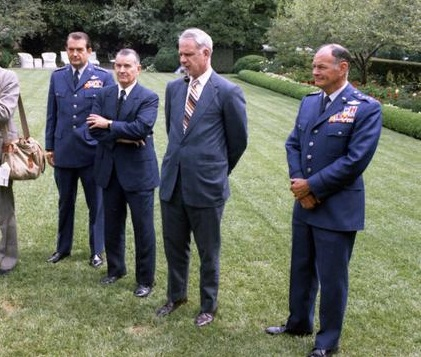
Air Force Chief of Staff General George S. Brown with Secretary of Defense James R. Schlesinger and USAFE Commander General David C. Jones and Deputy Secretary of Defense Bill Clements at the White House 1974.

In 1973, under the recommendation of the Secretary of the Air Force, Robert Seamans and Secretary of Defense, James R. Schlesinger, President Richard Nixon appointed Brown to be Chief of Staff of the United States Air Force, effective 1 August 1973. General Brown became the first Air Force chief of staff who had previously never held the position of Air Force vice chief of staff. Brown was successful in building his character and leadership, mostly during his time as a general officer, and his tenure at several high-ranking positions had made him the favored choice for higher position within the military for quite some time. According to Brown biography book "Destined for Stars" written by Edgar F. Puryear Jr. several high-ranking people within the military and government officials had predicted that Brown someday would achieve a higher position within the military, such as Brown predecessor General John D. Ryan who informed Brown that he was his favorite choice to succeed him as Air Force Chief of Staff after Ryan assumed the Air Force Chief of Staff position in August 1969.

General George S. Brown was sworn in as the eighth Chief of Staff of the United States Air Force on August 1, 1973. In this capacity Brown oversaw all United States major operations both domestic and international and all Air Force related projects, such as the development of the new fighter and bomber aircraft project which resulted in the F-15 and F-16 fighter aircraft and the B-1B strategic bomber aircraft. Brown emphasized the need of the modernization of United States Air Force Aircraft fleet following the Vietnam War and for the long-term future, in order to deter the growing Soviet weapon arsenal. Brown also emphasized the important role of Strategic Air Command as United States primary nuclear deterrence. Brown also emphasized the need of a new and modern missile that could strengthen the ballistic-missile as part of the Nuclear Triad, as a result the Air Force began the development of the new MX missiles.

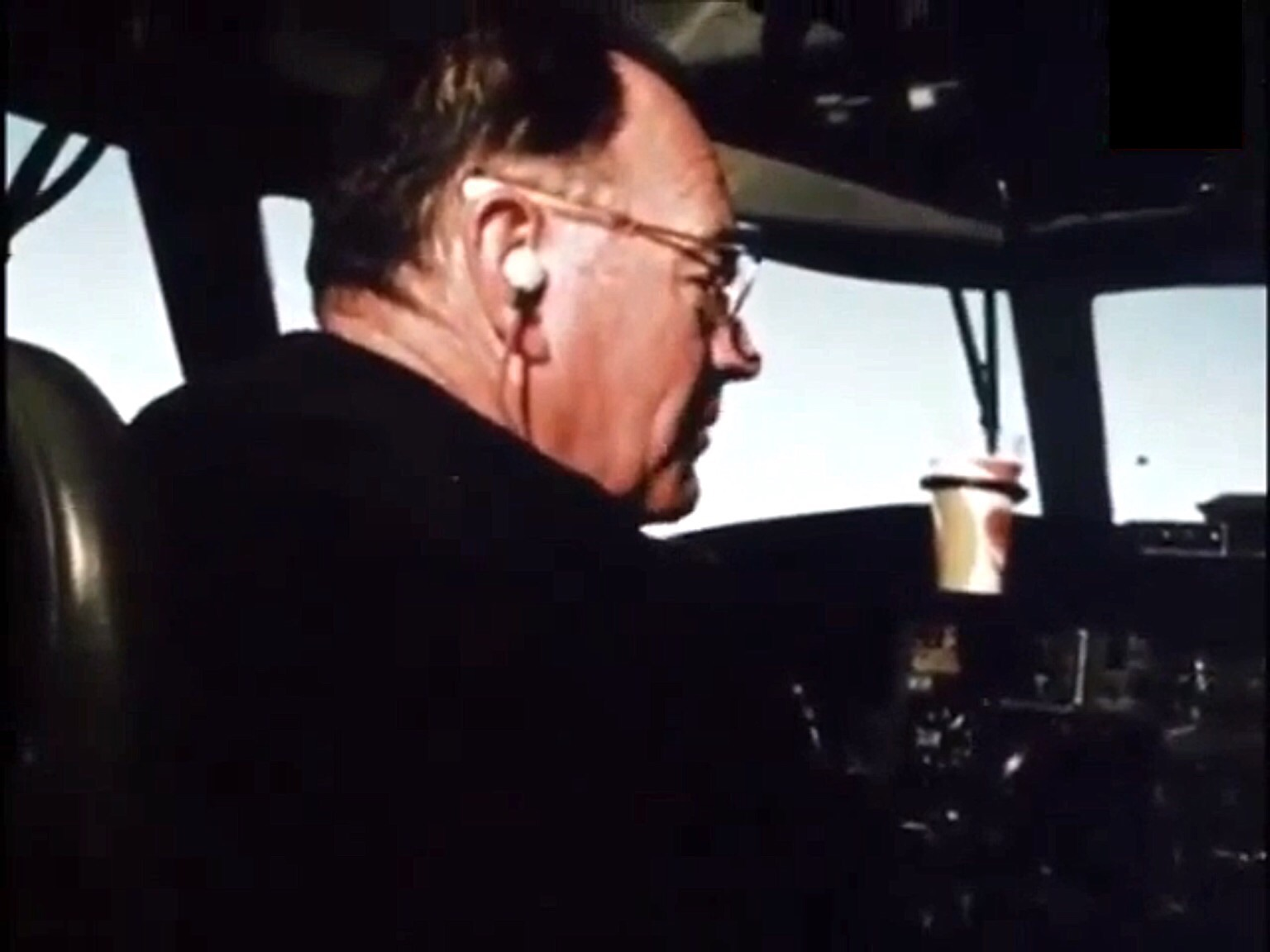
Air Force Chief of Staff General George S. Brown piloting a Lockheed VC-140B JetStar, October 1977.

During his tenure as Air Force Chief of Staff, Brown also wanted to create a new and different relationship with his fellow Air Force personnel, unlike his predecessor, in asking them not to hesitate to suggest new ideas for the Air Force. One of Brown's primary focus in reshaping and modernize the Air Force, is that not only focusing on the aircraft, weapons and material, but also with its own personnel and people within the Air Force especially the morale and spiritual welfare. During his tenure as Air Force Chief of Staff Brown also asked all personnel to participate at major religion events, such as the prayer for the release of the U.S. Military personnel that was held as Prisoner of War (POW) in Vietnam. During the Worldwide Commanders' Conference, Brown also called upon the personnel for a prayer on every occasion. Brown also often visited Air Force facility such as the Lackland Air Force Base where the new Airmen get its training and greeted them and joining them for lunch, which was depicted in the Air Force Now Movies series. Brown kept and maintained his relations with every Air Force personnel and didn't put a gap between him and other air force personnel including the junior personnel.

An avid aviator, Brown always spent time in the cockpit as its pilot and despite his busy schedule and time-consuming duties as Air Force Chief of Staff, General Brown always maintained his primary interest and proficiency as a pilot. At one occasion Brown always flew the Air Force aircraft that was used primarily for official trips such as Lockheed VC-140B Jetstar, North American T-39 Sabreliner and Boeing C-135 Speckled Trout. At some point when Brown was on official trips with Senator Barry Goldwater who was also a Major General within the United States Air Force Reserve and an avid aviator himself, Brown flew together in the cockpit with Senator Barry Goldwater.

However, Brown did not remain as Air Force Chief of Staff for long. He was appointed Chairman of the Joint Chiefs of Staff effective 1 July 1974. When Brown was nominated as Chairman of the Joint Chiefs of Staff, many Air Force personnel feel sad that Brown have to leave the Air Force to head the Joint Chiefs of Staff and the nation's highest-ranking military position, due to many Air Force personnel feeling that Brown was deeply needed within the Air Force. Brown was considered by many of the Air Force personnel as the "Brain" of the Air Force who brought so many idea and contribution within the Air Force that eventually led to the modernization of the Air Force.

== Chairman of the Joint Chiefs of Staff ==
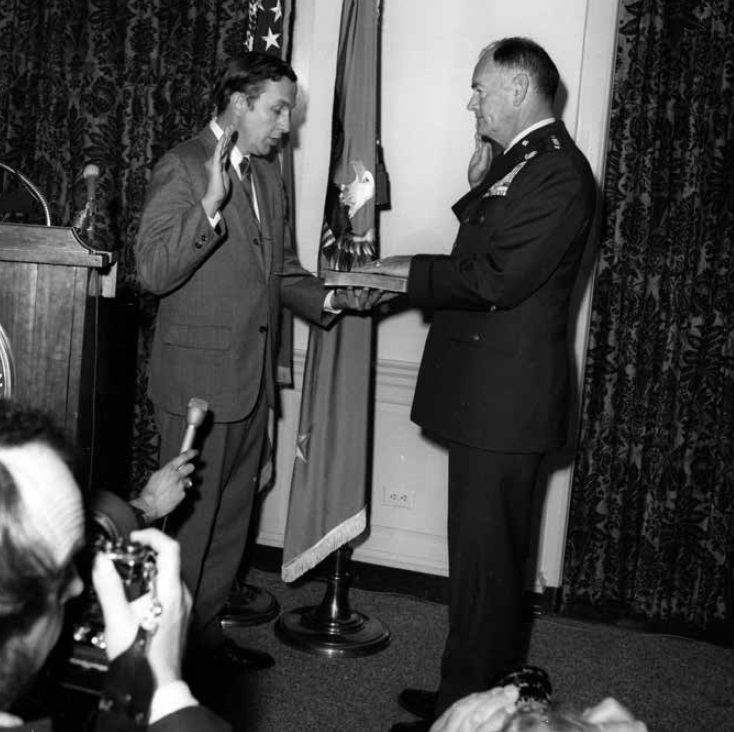
General George S. Brown is sworn in as Chairman of The Joint Chiefs of Staff by Department of Defense General Counsel Martin Hoffman at The Pentagon on July 1, 1974.

In 1974, following Admiral Thomas Moorer's scheduled retirement as Chairman of the Joint Chiefs of Staff, Brown was tapped by President Richard Nixon and Secretary of Defense James Schlesinger to succeed Moorer as Chairman of the Joint Chiefs of Staff. Many, including former Secretary of Defense Robert McNamara whom Brown once worked with as his military assistant, had previously predicted that Brown would someday be Chairman of the Joint Chiefs of Staff. According to General Robert J. Dixon, a protégé of Air Force Chief of Staff General Thomas D. White, when White was lying ill in the hospital due to terminal leukemia in 1964, General White told General Dixon to congratulate George S. Brown on behalf of General White if someday Brown became Chairman of the Joint Chiefs of Staff. This prophecy was proven true ten years later and was retold in Brown's biography "Destined for Stars" by Edgar F. Puryear Jr.

George S. Brown was sworn in as Chairman of the Joint Chiefs of Staff by Department of Defense General Counsel Martin Hoffman in a ceremony held in the Pentagon on July 1, 1974, which was attended by Secretary of Defense James Schlesinger and President Richard Nixon. In this capacity, Brown was the highest-ranking and most senior military officer within the United States Armed Forces, and was also the principal military advisor to the President, Secretary of Defense, and the National Security Council. Brown also become the first Air Force general to hold the position of Chairman of the Joint Chiefs of Staff, following the 14-year hiatus since General Nathan F. Twining retired as Chairman of the Joint Chiefs of Staff on August 15, 1960.

However, not long after Brown assuming the Chairman of the Joint Chiefs of Staff position, President Richard Nixon who appointed Brown as Chairman of the Joint Chiefs of Staff had to resign from the presidency due to the Watergate scandal and was succeeded by his Vice President Gerald Ford, who assumed the presidency following Nixon's resignation. Brown attended Nixon's departure at the White House Lawn on August 9, 1974, as well as Gerald Ford's inauguration ceremony as president.

As chairman, Brown was responsible for handling notable international events, such as the Turkish invasion of Cyprus in 1974, and the Mayaguez incident, the final act of the war in Vietnam in 1975. He also dealt with the 1976 shootings and Axe Murder Incident in the Korean Demilitarized Zone, and oversaw the Panama Canal Treaty in 1977.

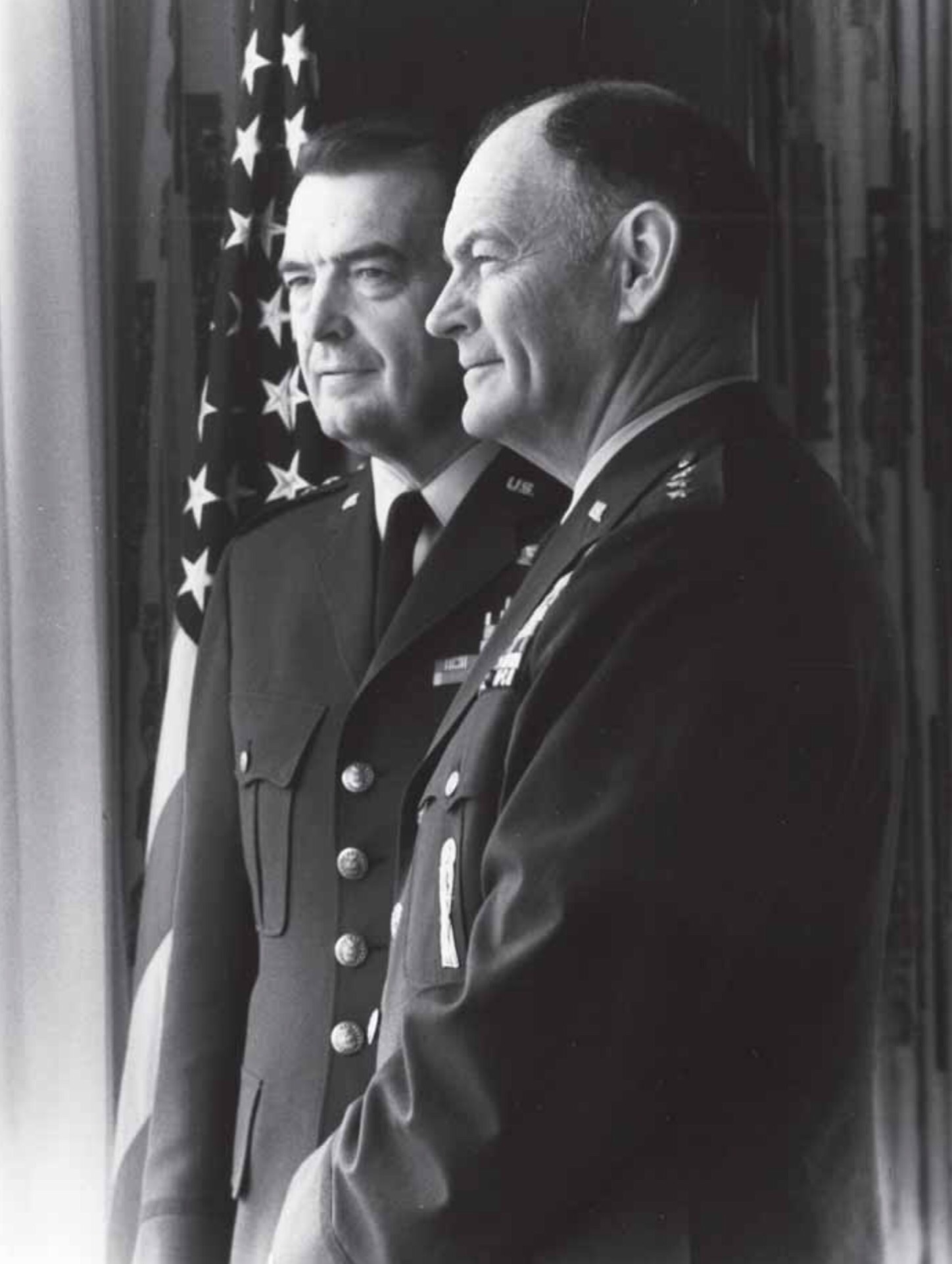
Chairman of The Joint Chiefs of Staff General George S. Brown and United States Air Force Chief of Staff General David C. Jones at The White House, in 1977.

One of Brown's primary duties as Chairman of the Joint Chiefs of Staff was the recasting and reshaping of the leadership within the Joint Chiefs. One of Brown's primary actions in reshaping the leadership within the Joint Chiefs was eliminating the J-2, which was basically responsible for communications function, and combining it with the J-3 operations. Brown also gave a chance to his fellow Joint Chiefs of Staff members such as the Air Force Chief of Staff, the Chief of Naval Operations, the Commandant of the Marine Corps and the Army Chief of Staff to handle crisis situations, in order to prepare them in case they were chosen to be the next Chairman of the Joint Chiefs of Staff. One notable case is during the Mayaguez incident, in which at that time Brown was on official foreign trips to attend NATO summit in Europe, during which Brown allowed Air Force Chief of Staff General David C. Jones to act as the acting Chairman of the Joint Chiefs of Staff, and to lead the discussion within the National Security Council on the military planning and military matters to execute the operations to save the crew of SS Mayaguez. Subsequently, Jones later was appointed as Chairman of the Joint Chiefs of Staff, succeeding Brown in 1978. Jones' experience as acting Chairman of the Joint Chiefs of Staff during the Mayaguez incident led to his effort to modernize the scope of the military to improve its relations with the civilian leadership, and that eventually led to the Military Reform act in 1986 that was famously known as the Goldwater–Nichols Act. Brown also asserted the importance of military modernization following the Vietnam War and the need to prepare for modern challenges, including the modernization of the Air Force aircraft fleet and continuing Brown's policy during his tenure as Air Force Chief of Staff. Brown described the Soviet Union as a "clear and present danger" and believed that the USSR was building up its military arsenal. Brown also asserted that in order to prepare for worst-case scenarios such as "First Strike," the United States must therefore be ready at any time for any event, to deter whichever worst-case situation might occur in the future. As part of this focus, Brown continued his effort to build up the Strategic Air Command nuclear triad arsenal that he had started during his tenure as Air Force Chief of Staff, and emphasized the need for both a new and modern bomber aircraft such as the B-1B Strategic Bomber Aircraft as well as the new MX intercontinental ballistic missile. Together with Secretary of Defense James Schlesinger, Brown began the study and development of a new and sophisticated weapon to deter any possible future threat.

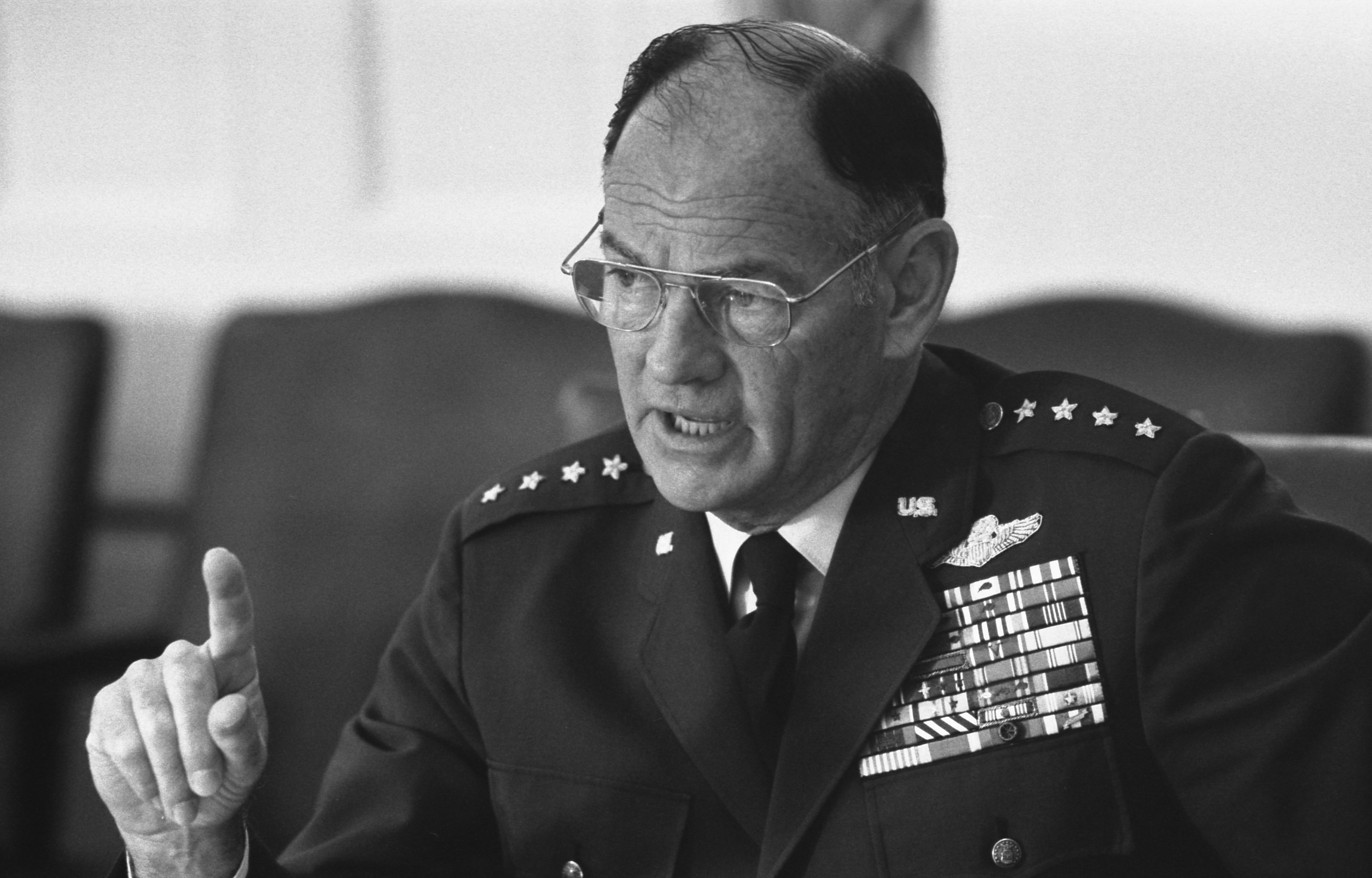
General George S. Brown during his tenure as Chairman of the Joint Chiefs of Staff.

However following the new Détente policy that was adopted in the early 1970s, Brown focused on how to ensure the United States Military was in robust shape and perpetually combat-ready while still following the Détente policy. Part of the Détente policy was the Strategic Arms Limitation Talks treaty, also known as the SALT treaty, which had already started in 1972, two years before Brown assumed the position of Chairman of the Joint Chiefs of Staff. Working together with Secretary of Defense James Schlesinger, Brown re-asserted that although both the United States and Soviet Union had signed the SALT treaty and were mutually practicing Détente, that the US should remain ready at any time to prevent any event that could catalyze a major crisis and concomitant escalation of tensions between the United States and the Soviet Union.

In November 1975, following James Schlesinger's retirement as Secretary of Defense and replacement by Donald Rumsfeld, Brown worked together with Rumsfeld to re-assert United States policy on military buildup and détente. Both Rumsfeld and Brown agreed to work to speed up the B-1B bomber program in order to make those aircraft ready for service within the United States Air Force as soon as possible. Together with Secretary of Defense Donald Rumsfeld, Brown tested the B-1B Aircraft on a flight-test in 1975. Another point of agreement between Brown and Rumsfeld was the new Fighter Aircraft program to modernize Air Force Tactical-Fighter Aircraft, and to replace some Air Force aircraft considered obsolete. As a result, the Air Force finally received the new tactical fighter aircraft, F-15s and F-16s, although the program has been studied during Brown's tenure as Air Force Chief of Staff along with Air Force Secretary Robert Seamans.

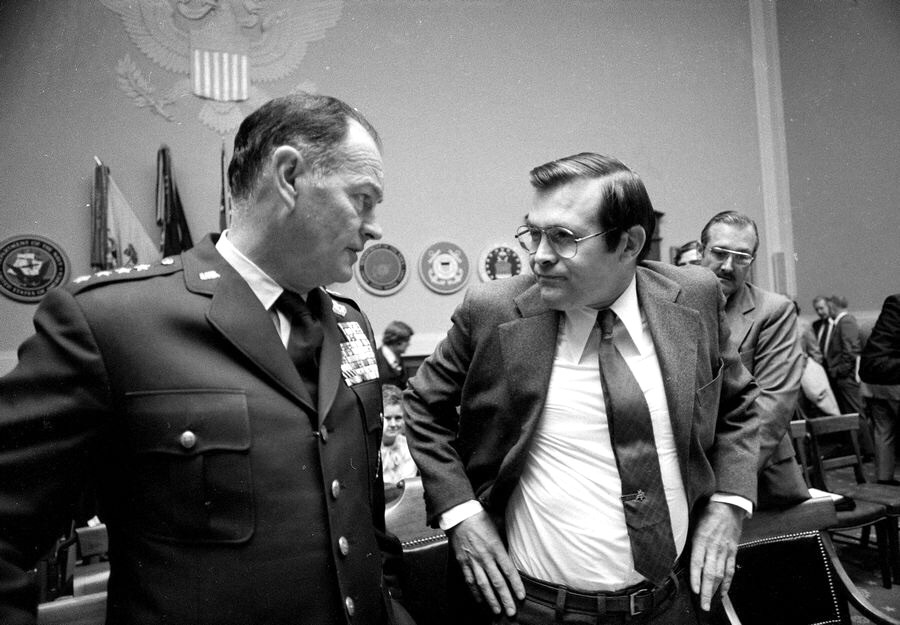
Chairman of the Joint Chiefs of Staff General George S. Brown with Secretary of Defense Donald H. Rumsfeld during testimony at Senate Armed Services Committee on January 15, 1976.

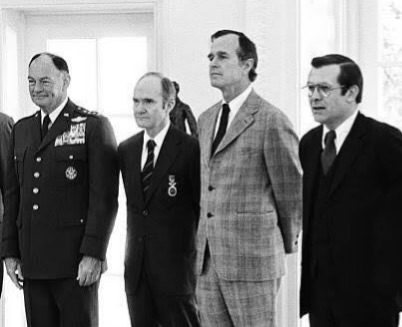
Chairman of the Joint Chiefs of Staff General George S. Brown with Secretary of Defense Donald Rumsfeld and National Security Advisor Lieutenant General Brent Scowcroft and CIA Director George H.W. Bush at The Oval Office, White House on March 11, 1976.

Following the SALT I Treaty Talk in 1972, the Ford administration, which continued the Nixon Administration Détente policy, began the SALT II Treaty Talk. Ford tried to have the SALT II Treaty talk before the 1976 presidential election and ask the Defense Department to immediately come up with the important points for the SALT II Treaty. Together with Secretary of Defense Donald Rumsfeld, Brown worked together to develop the important point for SALT II Treaty. However, the SALT II Treaty important points did not come up due to several disagreements and failed to meet its deadline before the 1976 election. The treaty was eventually signed in 1979 during the Carter administration.

Brown had a reputation for speaking frankly and forthright, as indicated by some of his statements getting heavily criticized during his term as chairman. The event happened when Brown commented on two occasions—firstly to a Duke University audience in October 1974, and then to a French reporter in 1976—that Israel was becoming a burden to the Pentagon and that he believed the reason for continued military aid was due to Jews having control over America's banks, newspapers and elected officials. His exact words were:

It's so strong you wouldn't believe now. We have the Israelis coming to us for equipment. We say we can't possibly get the Congress to support that. They say, 'Don't worry about the Congress. We will take care of the Congress.' Now this is somebody from another country, but they can do it. They own, you know, the banks in this country, the newspapers. Just look at where the Jewish money is.

Brown's comments at Duke and subsequent reprimand by President Gerald Ford were reported on the front page of The Washington Post on 13 and 14 November 1974. There was speculation that Brown would be asked to resign, or at least not be nominated for a second two-year term; but he was re-nominated and went on to serve under the new president, Jimmy Carter.

In April 1976 during an interview with Ranan Lurie, a cartoonist for Newsweek, Brown was asked to comment on his opinion of the British Armed Forces, Brown replied, "They're no longer a world power. All they've got are generals, admirals and bands." Reaction in Britain was mixed. Some, like Lord Allenby condemned Brown's remarks, while others, like Lord Monckton acknowledged the truth of the remarks.

=== Evacuation of Saigon ===
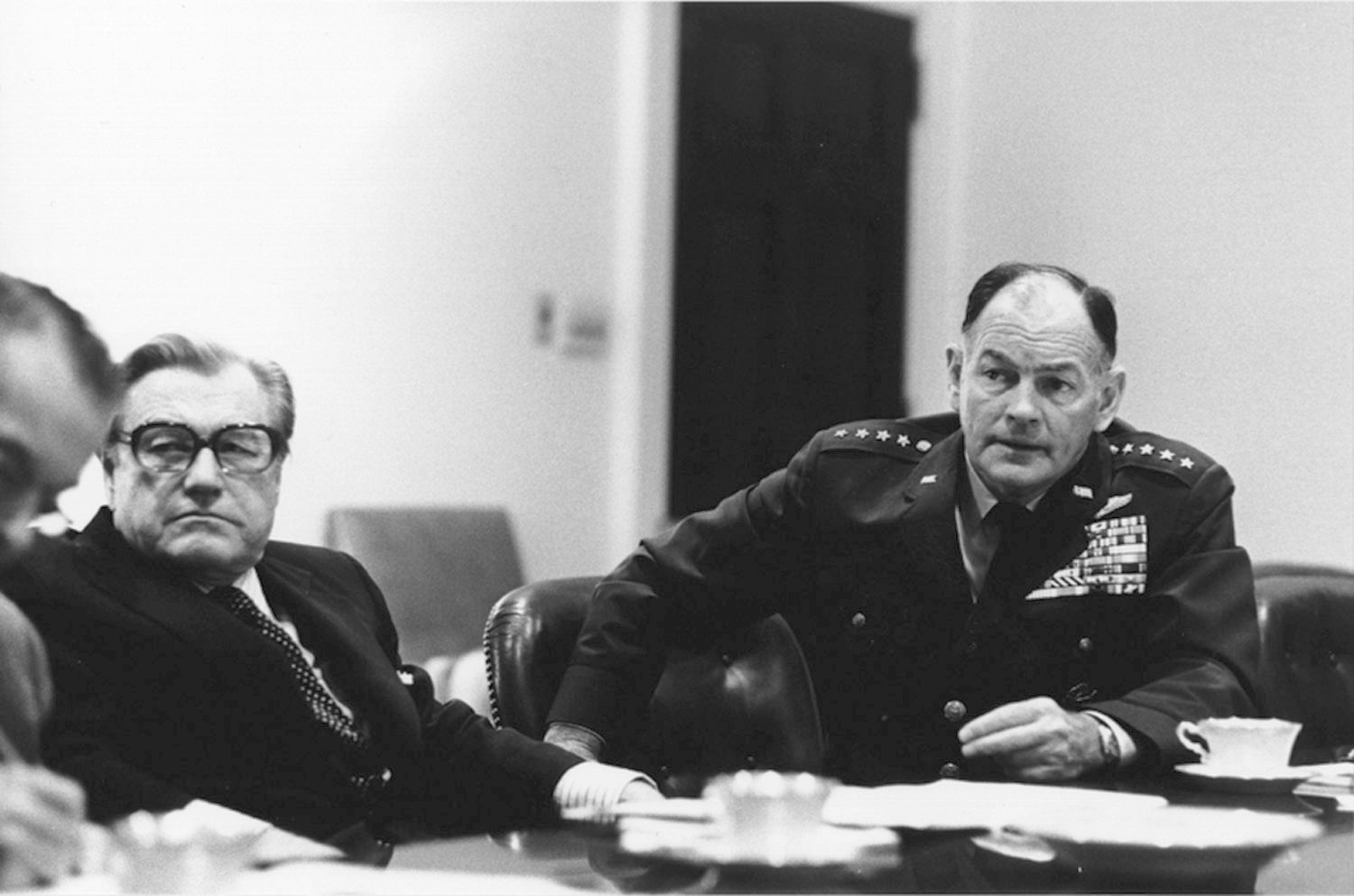
Brown and Vice President Nelson Rockefeller listen to a briefing on the evacuation of Saigon, 28 April 1975

One of the most important events during Brown's tenure as Chairman of the Joint Chiefs of Staff was the evacuation of Saigon after North Vietnamese troops defeated South Vietnamese troops in battles fought during the 1975 Spring Offensive, occupied many South Vietnamese cities and marched towards Saigon, the capital city of South Vietnam. Brown advised the National Security Council by the end of March 1975 that the United States should immediately begin the evacuation of American citizens that were still left in Saigon and other South Vietnam cities. Brown eventually oversaw the military operations to evacuate U.S. citizens in Saigon. He organized the military's tactical airlift aircraft in coordination with Air Force Chief of Staff General David C. Jones to evacuate American citizens out of Saigon as soon as possible. The operations also used several commercial aircraft to accelerate the evacuation. The operations were focused on Tan Son Nhat Airport in Saigon, which was the only primary airport left in South Vietnam following Da Nang's fall to the North Vietnamese Army. One of Brown's messages to all military personnel involved in the operations was a message to not leave anyone behind.

However, on 28 April 1975, Tan Son Nhat Airport came under heavy artillery fire and an attack from the North Vietnamese Air Force that eventually crippled the airport. Brown therefore briefed President Gerald Ford, Secretary of Defense James Schlesinger and the National Security Council on how to continue the evacuation following the attack on Tan Son Nhat Airport; his briefing took into account that there were no airports that were still under South Vietnamese jurisdiction. Brown and the Joint Chiefs of Staff came up with the idea of an evacuation that primarily involved helicopters. As a result, Operation Frequent Wind was initiated from 29 April to 30 April 1975. The operation managed to evacuate many people out of Saigon by flying them via helicopters to a nearby United States aircraft carrier in the South China Sea. A CIA-operated airline, Air America, was also involved in Operation Frequent Wind and deployed much of their Huey helicopter fleet. The operation ended on the morning of 30 April 1975 following the evacuation of U.S. Ambassador Graham Martin and the last U.S. Marines in Saigon.

=== Carter Administration ===
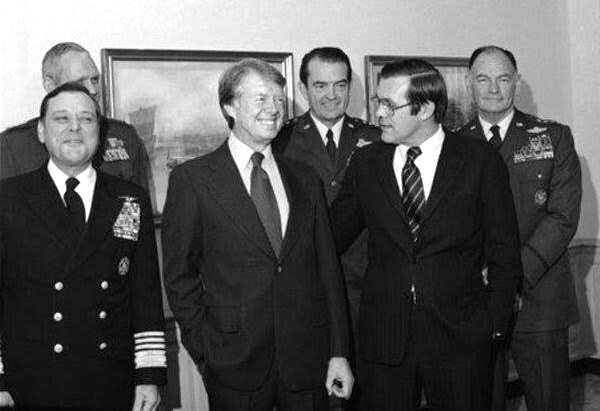
Chairman of the Joint Chiefs of Staff General George S. Brown accompanied President-Elect Jimmy Carter during a tour to The Pentagon along with Secretary of Defense Donald Rumsfeld and the other members of the Joint Chiefs of Staff on 17 December 1976.

Following Gerald Ford's defeat in the 1976 Presidential election and Jimmy Carter assuming the presidency on 20 January 1977, Brown remained to serve as Chairman of the Joint Chiefs of Staff under Carter. Before Carter assumed the Presidency, Brown and Secretary of Defense Donald Rumsfeld briefed the incoming Carter administration National Security team, including the new Secretary of Defense, Harold Brown, about initiatives that had been taken during Ford administration and would continue under Carter administration, such as the SALT II treaty talks. Brown and Rumsfeld also gave Carter and his incoming National Security team a tour of The Pentagon in December 1976. They worked together on a military policy, especially the incoming SALT II Treaty and the continuation of Détente policy.

However, there were some differences on military matters between Ford and Carter administrations, with which Brown disagreed, such as Carter's campaign pledge to make the Pentagon more efficient, which led to the cancellation of some of important military modernization programs. As a result, the B-1B Program, which Brown is strongly supported, was cancelled. Brown also strongly opposed Carter's decision to withdraw the United States Military from South Korea in May 1977. But at some point Carter and Harold Brown did agree with Brown about the important role of Strategic Air Command as the nation's primary nuclear deterrent.

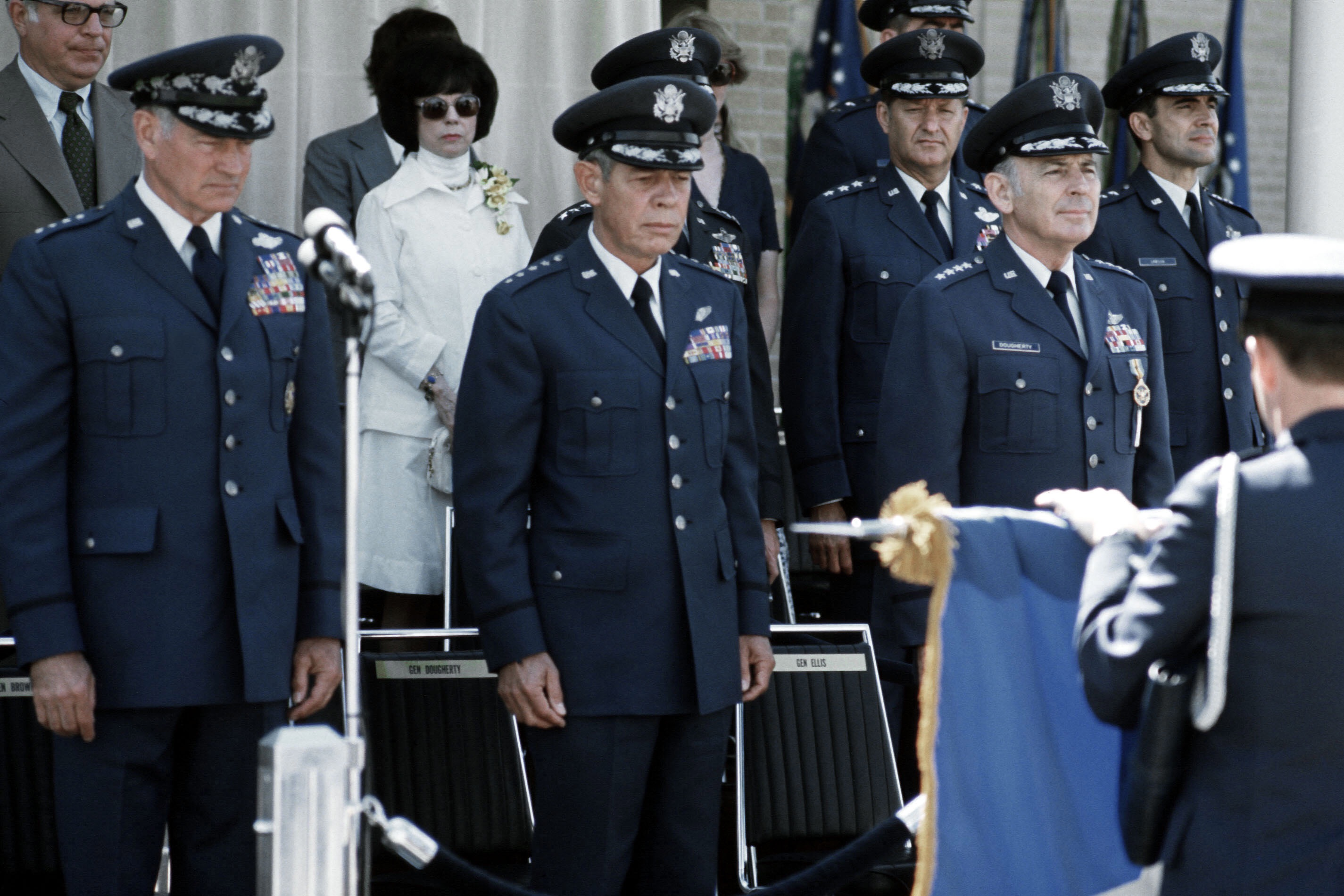
Chairman of the Joint Chiefs of Staff General George S. Brown during the Strategic Air Command change of command ceremony in Offutt Air Force Base, Nebraska on 8 January 1977.

During the Carter administration, talks began with the government of Panama handover the Panama Canal that led to the Panama Canal Treaty. On 26 September 1977, Brown gave a testimony to the House Committee on International Relations regarding his opinion of the treaty. His remarks stressed the importance of United States use of the canal instead of ownership. He emphasized that the United States military must have access to the canal, both in war and in peace time and that its security must be continually assured. Brown saw that the capability to defend the Panama Canal in order for it not to fall into the wrong hands was dependent on cooperation between the United States and Panama.

Brown remained in Carter administration for a year, from 20 January 1977 to 20 June 1978. During his last term as Chairman of the Joint Chiefs of Staff, he continued to advise the Carter Administration about the importance of the United States military arsenal modernization, and the buildup of its deterrence against potential threats, even as the Carter administration stressed Pentagon budget reduction. Many of his colleagues on the Department of Defense and the Joint Staff praised his leadership, including Rumsfeld, who praised Brown as one of the most brilliant and smartest man he ever worked with.

== Retirement ==
Brown was diagnosed with prostate cancer in early 1978. Although Brown was still able to carry out his duties as Chairman of the Joint Chiefs of Staff, his cancer caused his health to deteriorate, forcing him to take early retirement on 21 June 1978, twelve days before he was due to retire as Chairman of the Joint Chiefs of Staff. Brown was replaced by Air Force Chief of Staff General David C. Jones, who assumed the position on June 21, 1978.

Although he was ill, Brown remained involved in discussions on a number of military matters and appeared on a Public Policy Forum TV program in 1978 to discuss the roles of the Joint Chiefs of Staff along with a former Chairman of the Joint Chiefs of Staff. Brown died at the Malcolm Grow Air Force Hospital at Andrews Air Force Base, Maryland, on 5 December 1978, and was buried in Arlington National Cemetery in Section 21.

== Dates of rank ==
Insignia	Rank	Date
	Corporal	January 1937
	Second Lieutenant	June 11, 1941
	First Lieutenant	June 18, 1942 (permanent on June 12, 1944)
	Captain	October 20, 1942
	Major	February 13, 1943 (permanent on September 3, 1948)
	Lieutenant Colonel	August 27, 1943 (permanent on April 12, 1951)
	Colonel	October 1, 1944 (permanent on April 24, 1956)
	Brigadier General	August 1, 1959 (permanent on January 30, 1962)
	Major General	April 1, 1963 (permanent on February 27, 1964)
	Lieutenant General	August 1, 1966
	General	August 1, 1968

== Awards and decorations ==
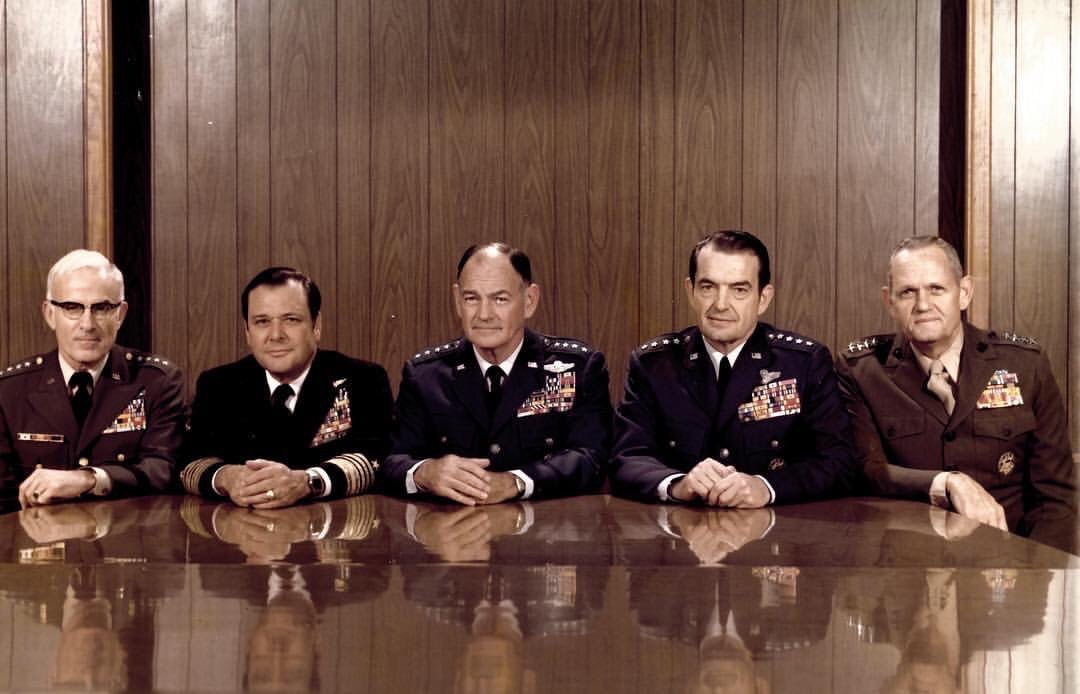
Chairman of The Joint Chiefs of Staff General George S. Brown with the other members of The Joint Chiefs of Staff at The Pentagon in 1977.

Command Air Force Pilot Badge
Office of the Joint Chiefs of Staff Identification Badge

Distinguished Service Cross
Defense Distinguished Service Medal
Air Force Distinguished Service Medal with three bronze oak leaf clusters
Navy Distinguished Service Medal
Silver Star
Legion of Merit with two bronze oak leaf clusters
Distinguished Flying Cross with bronze oak leaf cluster
Bronze Star Medal
Air Medal with three bronze oak leaf clusters
Joint Service Commendation Medal
Army Commendation Medal
Presidential Unit Citation
Air Force Outstanding Unit Award with Valor device
American Defense Service Medal
American Campaign Medal with one bronze campaign star
European-African-Middle Eastern Campaign Medal with seven campaign stars
World War II Victory Medal
National Defense Service Medal with bronze service star
Korean Service Medal with two campaign stars
Vietnam Service Medal with six campaign stars
Air Force Longevity Service Award with silver and three bronze oak leaf clusters
Small Arms Expert Marksmanship Ribbon
Croix de Guerre with bronze Palm (France)
British Distinguished Flying Cross
Order of National Security Merit Cheon-Su with Silver Star (Korea)
Republic of Vietnam National Order of Vietnam, Commander
Republic of Vietnam Distinguished Service Order, First Class (Air Force)
Order of Aeronautical Merit (Brazil), Grand Officer
Republic of Korea Presidential Unit Citation
United Nations Korea Medal
Vietnam Campaign Medal

=== Distinguished Service Cross citation ===

Brown, George S.
Major, U.S. Army Air Forces
Headquarters, 93d Bombardment Wing (H), Ninth Air Force (Attached)
Date of Action: August 1, 1943

== Other honors and recognition ==
- 1974, Golden Plate Award of the American Academy of Achievement
- 1985, The National Aviation Hall of Fame

== Gallery ==
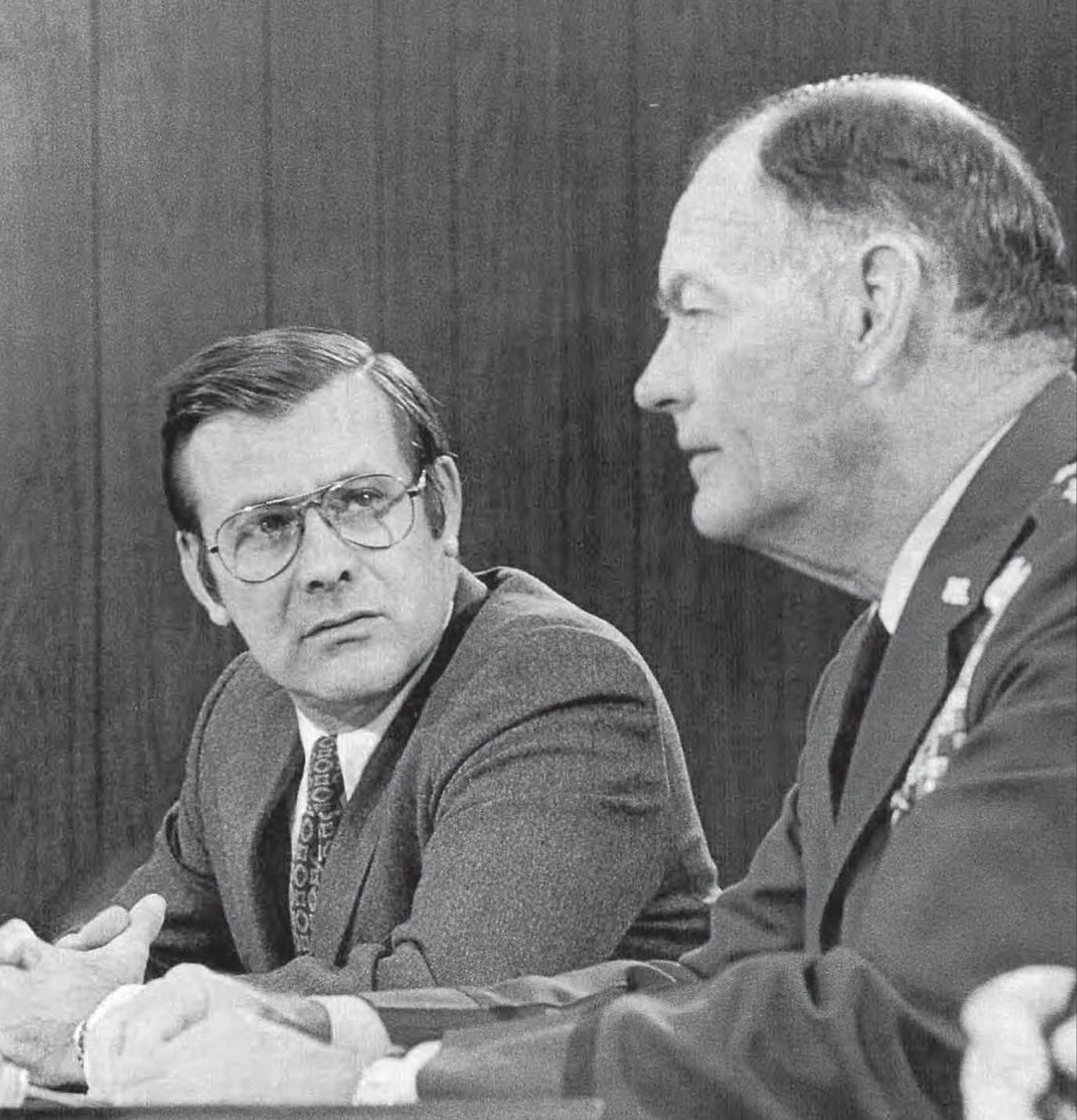
Chairman of the Joint Chiefs of Staff General George S. Brown with Secretary of Defense Donald Rumsfeld during a press conference in The Pentagon on January 15, 1976.

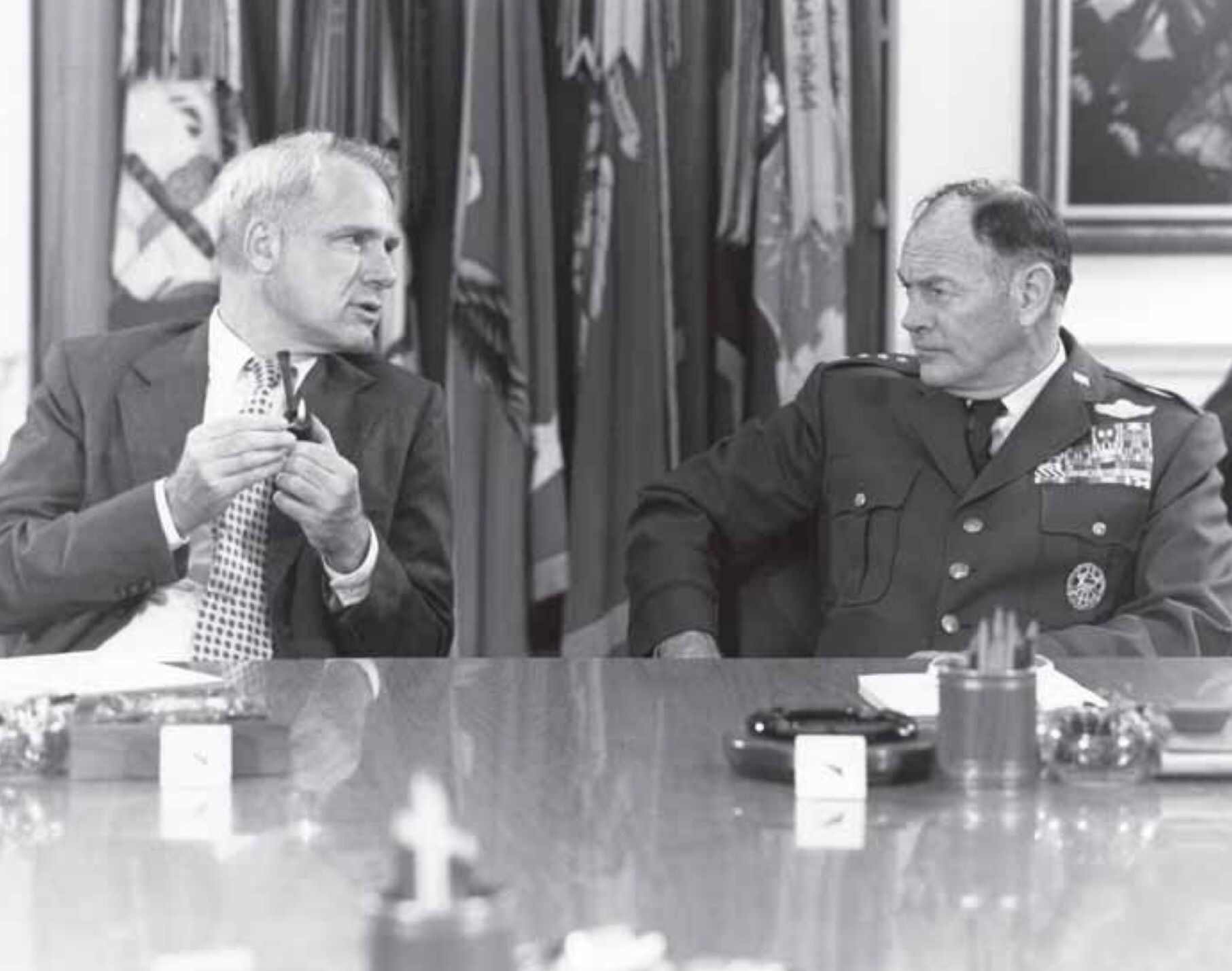
Chairman of The Joint Chiefs of Staff General George S. Brown with Secretary of Defense James Schlesinger during a weekly meeting at The Pentagon on November 8, 1974.

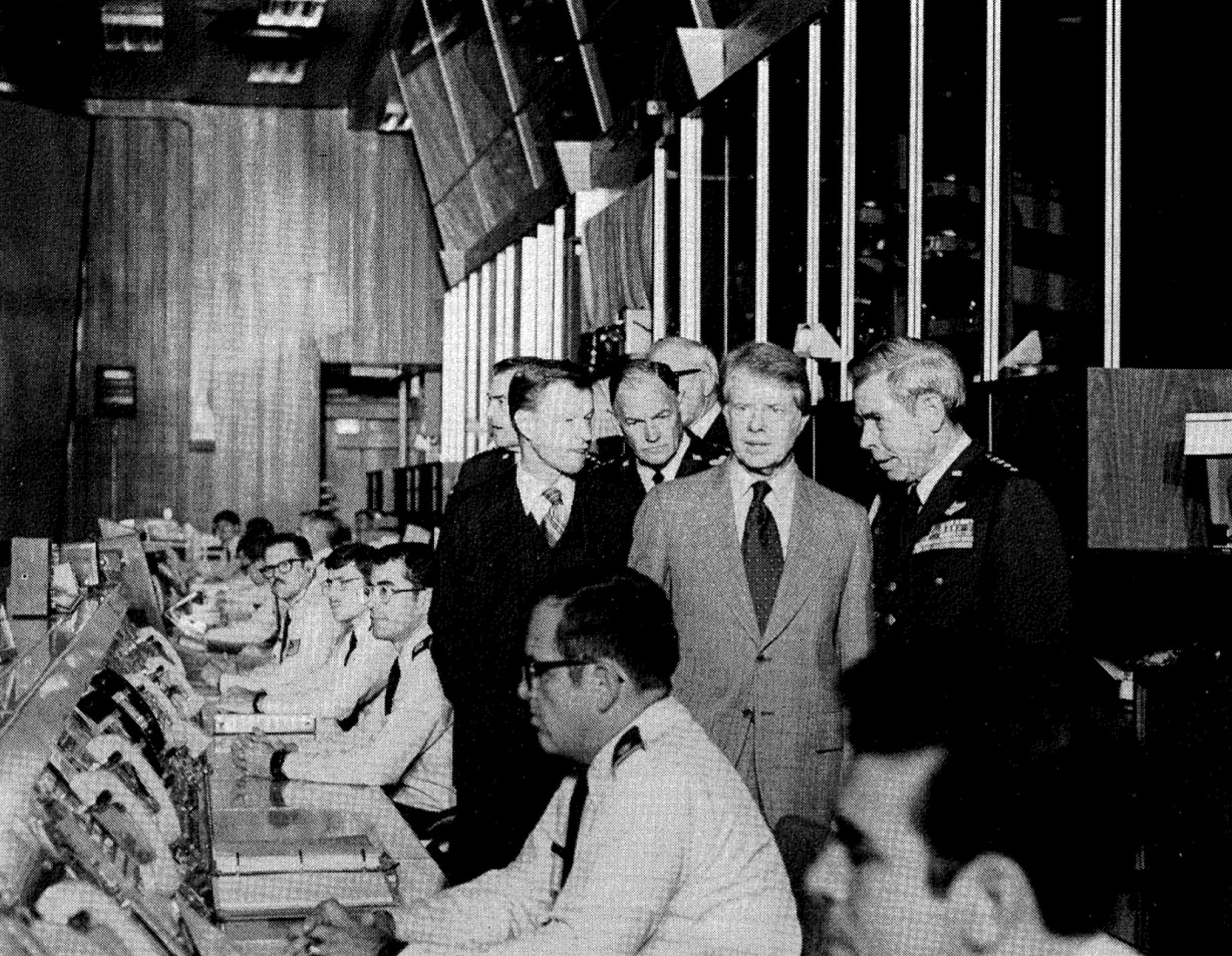
Chairman of The Joint Chiefs of Staff General George S. Brown while accompanying President Jimmy Carter on a tour to Strategic Air Command's Headquarters in Offutt Air Force Base, Nebraska along with United States Air Force Chief of Staff General David C. Jones and Commanders-in-Chief of The Strategic Air Command General Richard H. Ellis and National Security Advisor Zbigniew Brzezinski, October 27, 1977.

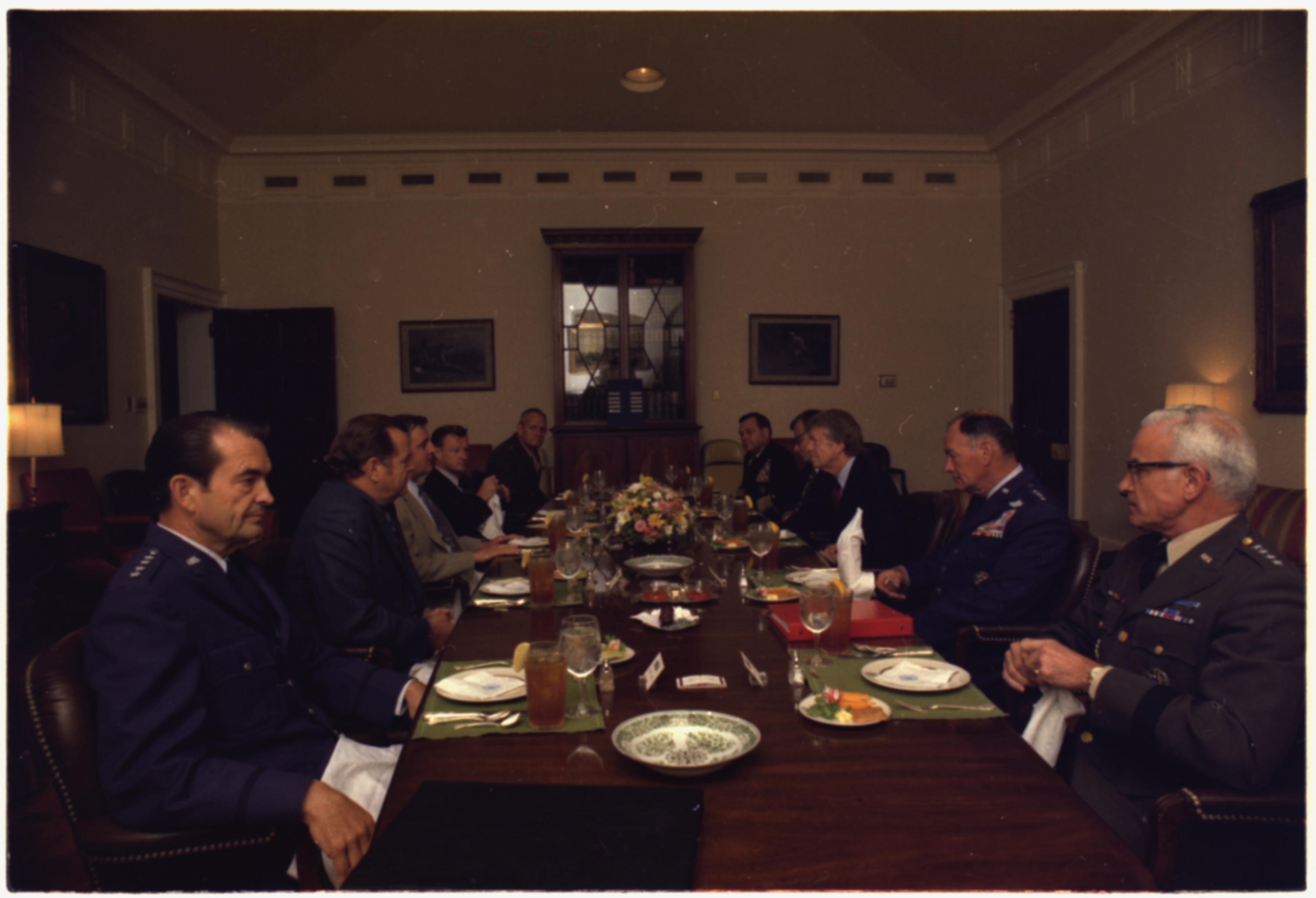
Chairman of the Joint Chiefs of Staff General George S. Brown and the other members of the Joint Chiefs of Staff during a meeting with President Jimmy Carter and the National Security Council in The White House on August 5, 1977.

== Notes ==
Military offices
Preceded by John Dale Ryan	Chief of Staff of the United States Air Force; 1973–1974	Succeeded by David C. Jones
Preceded by Thomas H. Moorer	Chairman of the Joint Chiefs of Staff; 1974–1978	Succeeded by David C. Jones
