= Inmaculada Concepción =

Inmaculada Concepción is the Immaculate Conception in Spanish language. The name may make reference to several religious buildings

- Academia de la Inmaculada Concepción in Mayaguez, Puerto Rico
- Catedral Basílica Inmaculada Concepción del Buen Viaje in Morón, Argentina
- Nuestra Señora de la Asunción, Navalcarnero in Navalcarnero, Spain
- Church of la Inmaculada Concepción (Romancos) in Romancos, Spain
- Colegio de la Inmaculada Concepcion in Cebu City, Philippines
- Colegio Inmaculada Concepción in San Fernando, Chile
- Fortress of the Immaculate Conception, local name "El Castillo de la Inmaculada Concepción", in El Castillo, Nicaragua
- Iglesia de la Inmaculada Concepción, Rivera in Rivera, Uruguay
- Inmaculada Concepción Seminary in Buenos Aires, Argentina
- Monastery of Inmaculada Concepción (Loeches) in Loeches, Spain

== Other uses ==
- Inmaculada Concepción (Murillo, 1670), a painting made by Bartolomé Esteban Murillo in 1670
- Conchita Martínez (born 1972), professional name of Inmaculada Concepción Martínez
- Santa María (ship), one of Columbus ships (full name, La Santa María de la Inmaculada Concepción)

== See also ==
- Concepción (disambiguation)
- Immaculate Conception (disambiguation)
