= Immaculate Conception (disambiguation) =

The Immaculate Conception is the conception of the Virgin Mary free from original sin by virtue of the merits of her son Jesus.

Immaculate Conception may also refer to:

- Feast of the Immaculate Conception, celebrates the belief in the Immaculate Conception of the Blessed Virgin Mary celebrated on December 8
- Immaculate Conception (film), a 1992 film starring James Wilby and Melissa Leo
- The Immaculate Conception (novel), a novel by Gaétan Soucy

== Paintings ==
- Immaculate Conception (Piero di Cosimo), 1485–1505
- Immaculate Conception (Zurbarán), 1632
- The Immaculate Conception (El Greco, Toledo), 1613
- The Immaculate Conception (Tiepolo), 1768

== See also ==
- Church of the Immaculate Conception (disambiguation), churches dedicated to the Immaculate Conception
- Immacolata (disambiguation)
- Immaculata (disambiguation)
- Inmaculada Concepción (disambiguation), churches, schools and institutions dedicated to the Immaculate Conception in Spanish
- La Purísima Concepción (disambiguation)
