= Navalcarnero =

- Municipality
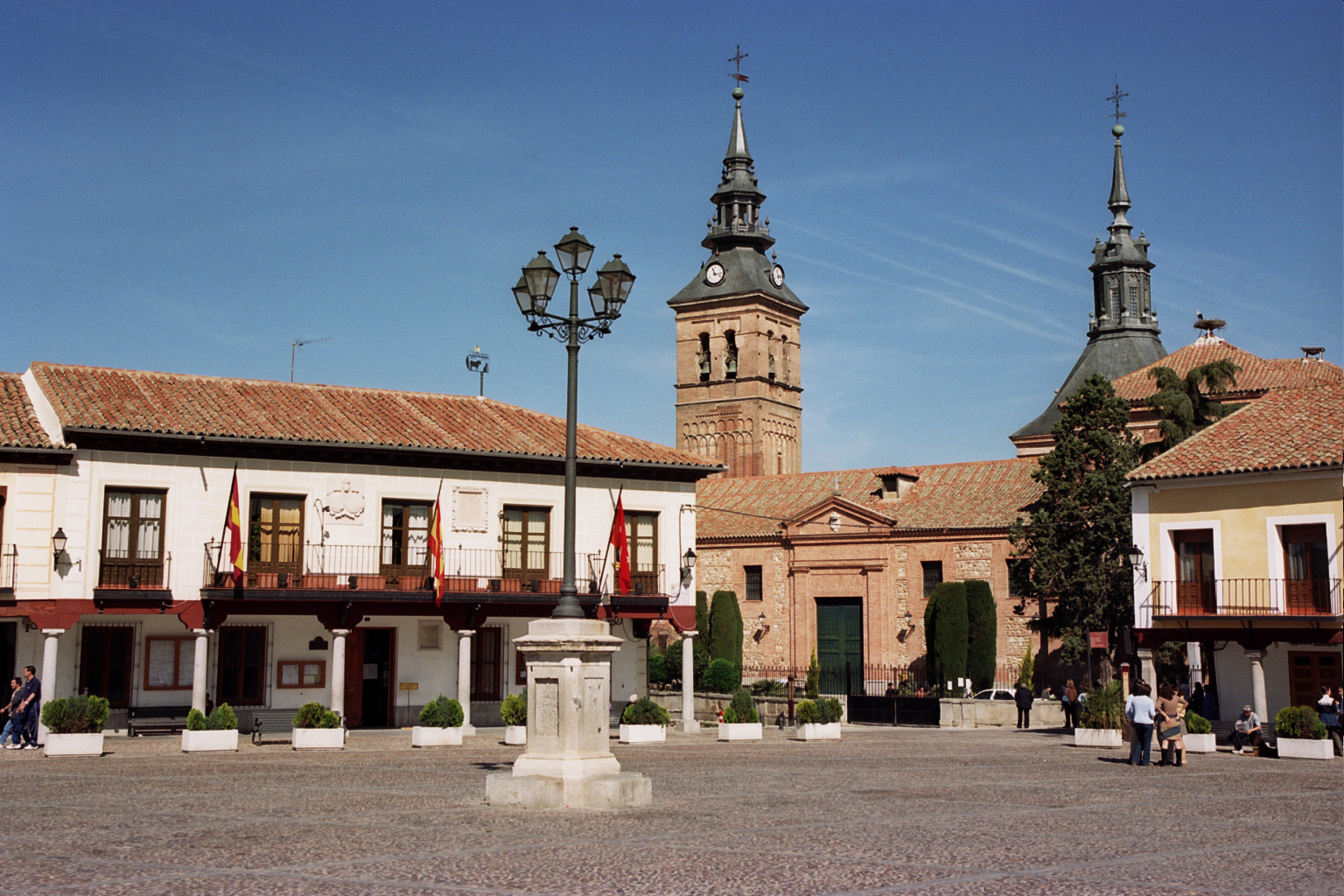

- Flag Coat of arms

- Location in Spain
- Coordinates: 40°17′5″N 4°0′49″W
- Country: Spain
- Community: Community of Madrid
- Province: Madrid
- Comarca: Suroeste

Government
  - Mayor: José Luis Adell (PSOE)

Area
  - Total: 100.2 km^{2} (38.7 sq mi)
- Elevation: 670 m (2,200 ft)

Population (2025-01-01)
  - Total: 33,331
  - Density: 332.6/km^{2} (861.5/sq mi)
- Demonym: Navalcarnereños
- Time zone: UTC+1 (CET)
  - Summer (DST): UTC+2 (CEST)
- Postal code: 28600

Navalcarnero is a municipality in the Community of Madrid, Spain, located about 31 kilometres (19 mi) from Madrid.

Sights include the church of Inmaculada Concepción.

== History ==
By the end of 1499 the city of Segovia founded the location of Navalcarnero, to put an end to the conflicts around the area. Since 1480 (when the Catholic Monarchs disposed of the sexmos of Valdemoro and Casarrubios), the territory had been progressively occupied by the vassals of the Marquis of Moya and those of Comendador don Gonzalo Chacón.

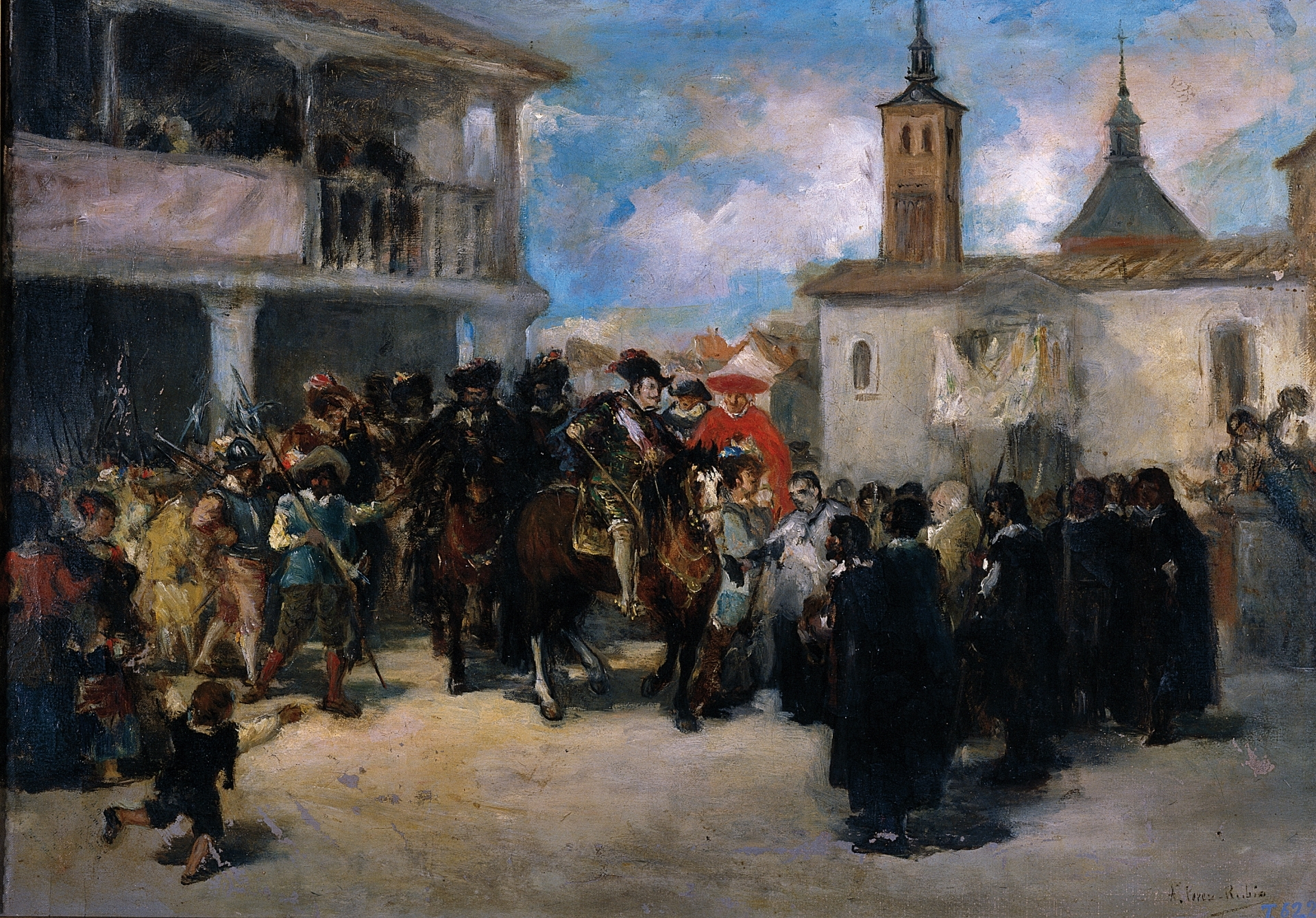
Felipe IV in Navalcarnero

On 10 October 1499 the first Mayor of Navalcarnero was elected from the six residents of Perales that founded the village.

Shortly after its foundation, in 1521, Alonso de Arreo, alderman and barrister of Navalcarnero helped Segovia in the Castilian War of the Communities.

Navalcarnero was under Segovian jurisdiction until 1627 (128 years), during which it was attacked several times and burned four times by the nearby domains. The city held a lawsuit against the Marquisate of Moya that lasted 93 years for the property of the Marimartín meadows. It also protected the rest of the municipality from don Gonzalo Chacón and his descendants for 118 years (until 1617).

In 1627 the municipality bought its own jurisdiction to the Crown, becoming an independent city; it kept, however, the Segovian coat of arms in its own.

Felipe IV married with Mariana de Austria in 1649 in Navalcarnero.

=== Spanish Civil War ===
In October 1936 Navalcarnero fell to Nationalist forces as they advanced on Madrid. John Whitaker, reporter for the New York Herald Tribune interviewed Mohamed Mizzian, a Moorish general of the Nationalists, and reported on Mizzian giving two captured teenage girls, one found with a trade-union card, to some forty of his troops for mass rape near Navalcarnero. Whitaker described how Mizzian "smirked when I remonstrated with him. 'Oh, they'll not live more than four hours,' he said".

In 1937, during and after the Battle of Jarama, captured Republican troops were held in Navalcarnero jail. Sixteen British International Brigade soldiers were interrogated, fingerprinted and had their heads shaved there before being paraded standing on the back of a truck guarded by members of the Civil Guard and filmed by Movietone News. They were held, nine to a cell, for four days before transfer to a prison in Talavera de la Reina.

== Transportation ==
The main access is through the A-5 freeway. The transportation company Blas y Cía operates a service linking Navalcarnero with Móstoles (Renfe station, lines 529, 529 A, 531 and 531 A), Alcorcón Hospital (line 529 H) and Madrid (Príncipe Pío, line 528).

Cevesa also links Madrid (Méndez Álvaro, line 536) with the housing development of Fado/Calypo, with several stops along the way in Alcorcón, Móstoles and Navalcarnero.
