= Immacolata (disambiguation) =

Immacolata is the Catholic doctrine of the Immaculate Conception.

Immacolata may also refer to:

- Immacolata (character), a character in Clive Barker's novel Weaveworld
- Church of Immacolata e San Vincenzo
- Immacolata School, a Catholic school in Richmond Heights, Missouri

== People with the given name ==
- Immacolata Battaglia (born 1960), Italian politician
- Immacolata Sirressi (born 1990), Italian volleyball player

== See also ==
- Immaculata (disambiguation)
- Immaculate Conception (disambiguation)
