= Nuestra Señora de la Asunción, Navalcarnero =

Cultural property in Navalcarnero, Spain

Iglesia Parroquial de Nuestra Señora de la Asunción
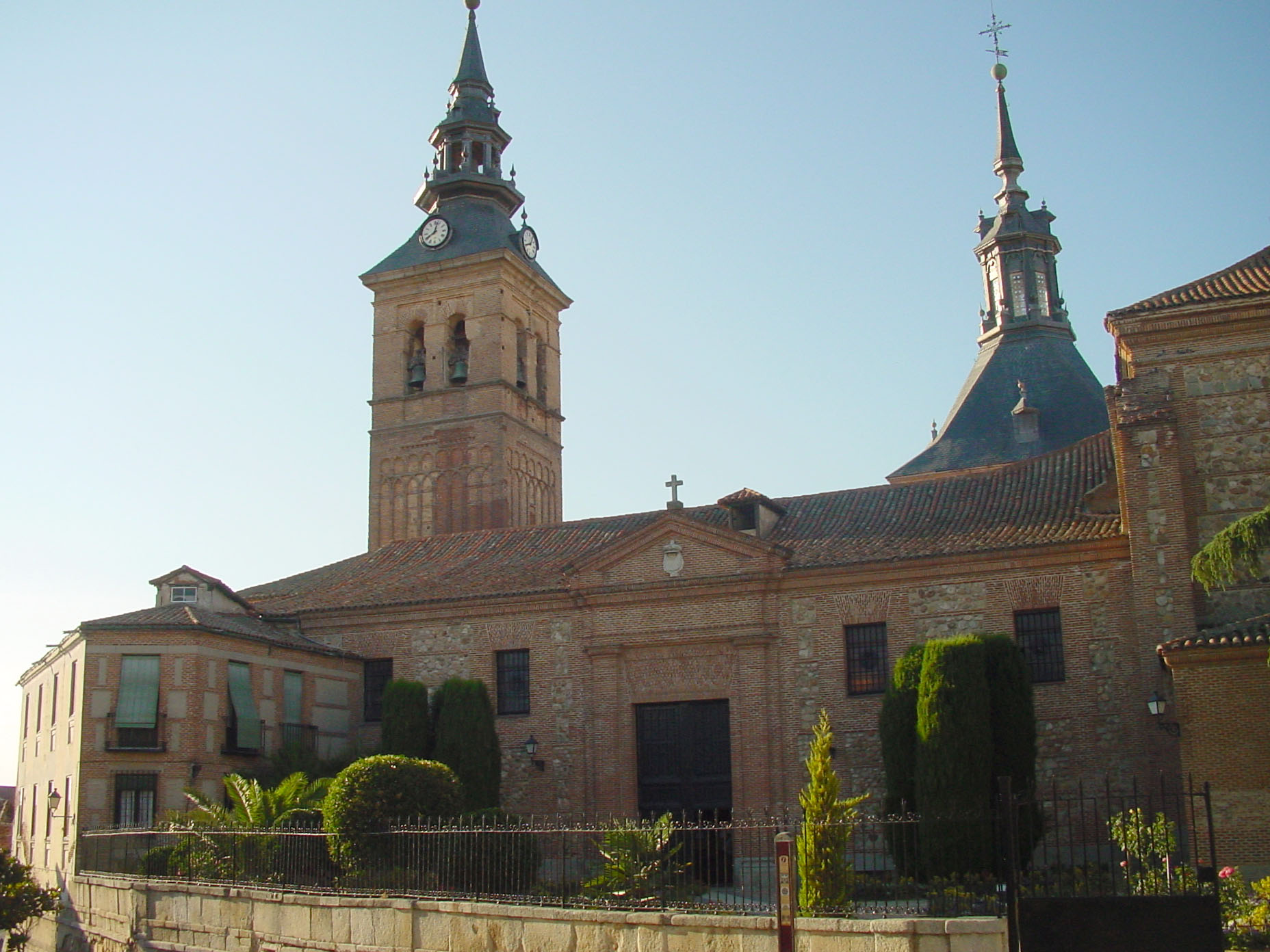

- Location within Spain
- 40.288362°N 4.014426°W
- Location: Navalcarnero, Spain

Spanish Cultural Heritage
- Official name: Iglesia Parroquial de Nuestra Señora de la Asunción
- Type: Non-movable
- Criteria: Monument
- Designated: 1983
- Reference no.: RI-51-0004778

Nuestra Señora de la Asunción ('Our Lady of the Assumption') is a church located in Navalcarnero, Spain. It was declared Bien de Interés Cultural in 1983.
