= Immaculate Conception (Zurbarán) =

Painting by Francisco de Zurbarán

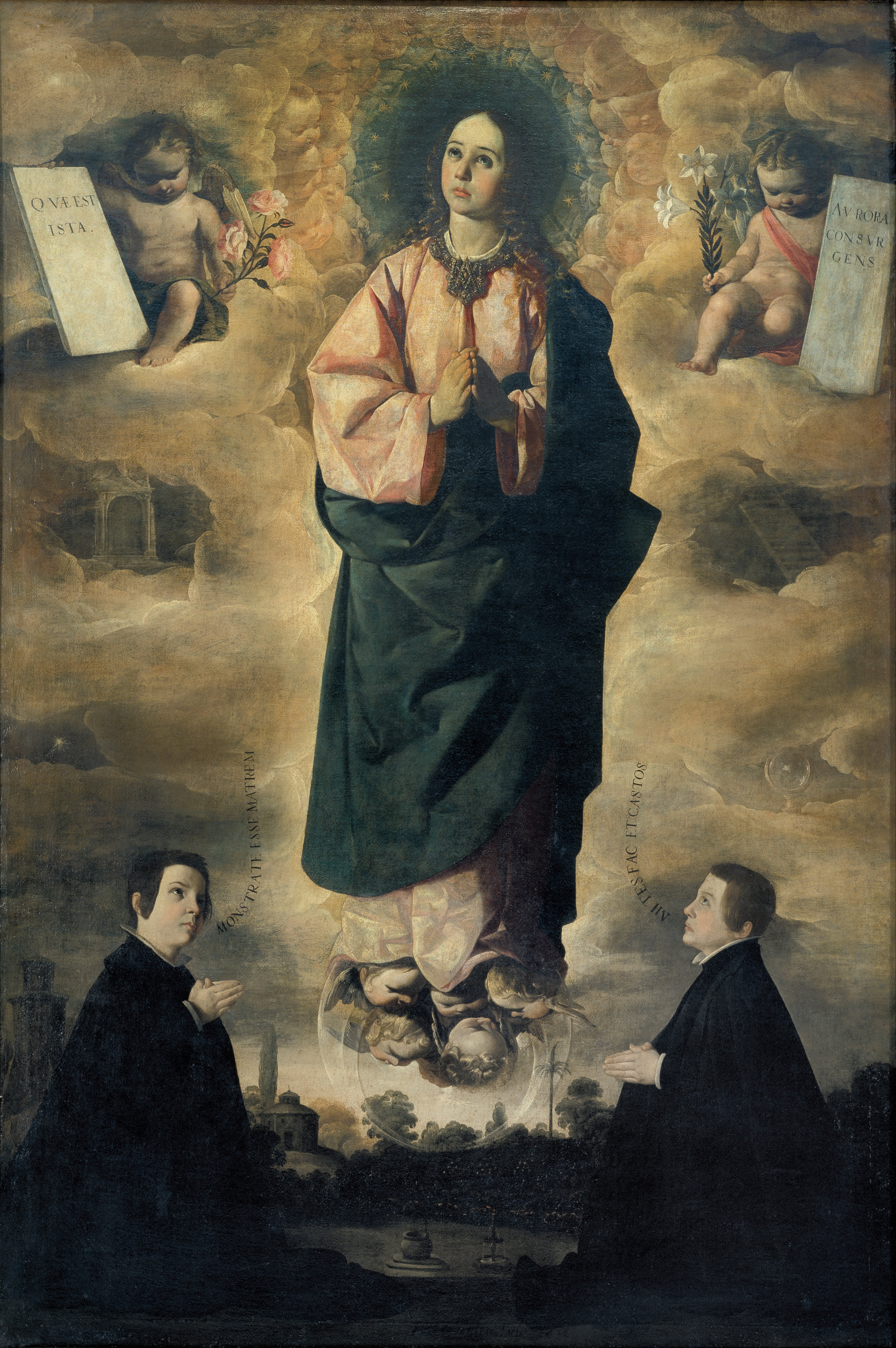
- Artist: Zurbarán
- Year: 1632
- Location: Museu Nacional d'Art de Catalunya; Barcelona, Spain

The Immaculate Conception is a painting by Francisco de Zurbarán, executed in 1632, conserved at the National Art Museum of Catalonia.

== Description ==
The Immaculate Conception represents Mary as the only mortal being free of original sin. This is a long-established Catholic doctrinal argument, frequently depicted in the painting of the Spanish Golden Age. Mary appears standing on five cherubim occupying a half moon. She is wearing a necklace with the anagram A(ve) M(aria), while a host of stars and angels emerge from the clouds in the halo around her head. On either side are angels with lilies, roses (attributes of purity) and tablets with inscriptions from the 'Song of Songs'. At the sides are two collegiates and symbols alluding to Mary: the Unblemished Mirror, Jacob's Ladder, Gates of Heaven and Morning Star. Zurbarán painted several versions of this theme, but this one is unquestionably the best.
