= I. maculata =

I. maculata may refer to:

- Idioptera maculata, a crane fly
- Ilisia maculata, a crane fly
- Inocybe maculata, a brown mushroom
- Iphinoe maculata, a hooded shrimp
- Isosillago maculata, a marine fish
- Ixia maculata, an iris native to South Africa
