= Immacolata (character) =

Fictional character

Immacolata aka the Incantatrix aka The Witch is a fictional character, created by Clive Barker and featured in his 1987 epic fantasy novel Weaveworld. One of the main villains in the book, she is an immensely powerful witch, her main goal being the destruction of the race she comes from, the magical creatures known as the Seerkind. Immacolata has also been turned into a comic character, after Weaveworld was adapted into a 1991 limited series by Epic Comics.

== Fictional character biography ==
=== Early life ===
Immacolata was a powerful witch, who was born as a member of the secret race of the Seerkind – mystical beings whose magical abilities have made them the object of fear and hatred by humans. The powers and appearance of the Seerkind have led humans ("Cuckoos", as the Seerkind derogatorily call them) to portray these beings in myths and fables. Immacolata claimed that she was the only descendant of the first pure genealogical line of sorcerers, being a direct descendant of Lilith. While an embryo in her mother's uterus, Immacolata manifested her inherent evil for the first time, using the umbilical cords of her triplet sisters in order to strangle them. As a result, she was the only one of the triplets to be born alive. However, even though she murdered her sisters, the young Immacolata also bound them with a spell that forced both of them to constantly accompany her in the form of ghosts throughout her life and protect her. Indeed, the two sisters (the Hag and Magdalene) were forced to serve their sister as ectoplasms, although they were granted the promise that as soon as their assistance was no longer required in her ploys, she would instantly dismiss them to find death and eternal rest. Immacolata spent most of her childhood wandering around graveyards and having a morbid interest in death and pain.

=== Adulthood ===
As an adult, Immacolata longed for power and control over the magical world of the Fugue, the world of the Seerkind. She started gathering loyals, who worshipped her as a goddess and committed several horrific crimes in her name. Her attempts to take over the back-then disorganised Fugue bore no fruit. After many bloody encounters between Immacolata's devotees and her enemies, the witch was found guilty of her crimes and was sentenced to exile by her peers. She was then forced to abandon the Fugue and started wandering aimlessly to the human world (The Kingdom of Cuckoos) for many centuries (she did not age, thanks to the power of the menstruum). Even in the human world, Immacolata started gathering a secret circle of fanatics who worshipped her and called her by several aliases, such as Black Madonna, Lady of the Sighs and Mater Maleficorium (mother of evil). Eventually though, she grew bored and always felt, in sharp contrast to the Cuckoos, to be able to fit in human society one day. At some point in the late 20th century, she met the greedy human known as Shadwell. The two decided to cooperate in order to find the rug within which laid woven the world of the Fugue. Immacolata even gave Shadwell a suit by use of which he could mesmerise others and control their will. At the same time, she kept having visions of the Scourge, the destructive force that had once almost destroyed the Seerkind, which was now lost in profound slumber, though the possibility of its reawakening filled the Incantatrix with terror. Immacolata later battled Suzanna Parish, granddaughter of the last guardian of the rug, Mimi Laschenski, but quite unexpectedly, when Suzanna was struck by the menstruum, the ethereal liquid force Immacolata wielded, she acquired it herself. After obtaining the rug, Immacolata wanted to destroy it but Shadwell insisted on performing a secret auction for some interested billionaires. Eventually though, the world of the Fugue was unleashed. Amid the chaos, Immacolata and her sisters wandered in the world where the witch was attacked by one of the lions of Romo, a Seerkind man who happened to be Mimi's first man. Romo wanted to exact revenge from her and his lion gravely injured Immacolata and deformed her face, before she killed it. The Incantatrix escaped but later both of her sisters were "slain" and she herself was betrayed by Shadwell who abandoned her (after she seemingly went insane, following the death of the Hag). Immacolata, half-mad and in a pathetic condition, was captured by the Seerkind. After Suzanna accidentally met her again, she tried to remind Immacolata of her past. Her effort was met with success, as Immacolata regained sanity, killed everyone around her (save for Suzanna) and flew towards the Temple of Loom, the centre of the Fugue, with the purpose of killing Shadwell and thus contaminating the temple with blood so as to bring forth the destruction of the Fugue. Instead, it was her blood that was shed after she was mortally stabbed by Shadwell, an act which indeed unmade the Fugue.

=== Afterlife ===
After all three sisters had expired, they merged into a unified ghost being which haunted the Shrine of Mortalities, an underground crypt storing the bones of those Seerkind who were killed by the Scourge. These series of underground crypts were located in the catacombs of a small church, hidden away in London and dedicated to Saint Philomena and Saint Callixtus. The place used to be a favourite hideaway for Immacolata when she was alive and the priests of the church had formed a secret cult, with the purpose of worshipping her. At the time the Three Sisters started haunting the catacombs, the cult grew even more loyal, now dubbing Immacolata with the novel name Lady of the Night. Later, Suzanna went to the church to meet with the Three Sisters (Immacolata still being the dominant personality) who warned her of the upcoming threat of the Scourge. Eventually, Shadwell and the Scourge (who had possessed Hobart) invaded the church, with the purpose of burning it down, since it was renowned for being a sanctuary of magic. The Three Sisters mocked the two villains and apparently disintegrated forever, after Uriel (the Scourge) used its holy flames to incinerate the walls of the tomb.

== Immacolata's sexuality ==
Immacolata is constructed by Barker as a woman who defies her sensuality and remains decidedly a virgin throughout her adult life. Clive Barker has remarked on her sexuality: "She's kind of sexy, yet dangerous at the same time. And yet a virgin, which makes her all the more sexier of course". Immacolata is seen rejecting the sexual advances of her accomplice, Shadwell, who is attracted to her. She appears to believe that her power somehow stems from her virginity - and thus sees the latter as a form of sacristy that preserves her status as a goddess-like being (thus enhancing an abstract association of her character with Virgin Mary, herself being called the Black Madonna). All three sisters possess unique aspects of sexuality: Immacolata is portrayed as a mysterious and attractive, young-looking woman who persists on sexual abstinence, the Hag is an old and infertile female entity and the Magdalene is sensual and hedonistic as well as a mother, birthing demonic creatures called by-blows created through the rape of human men and used for Immacolata's bidding.

== Powers and abilities ==
Immacolata has the ability to manifest raptures: like most of the Seerkind, she is able to produce illusions that mentally influence its receivers. Her most distinguishing aspect is the fact that she wields the menstruum: a glaring and strangely "alive" force that enables her to fly, create a shield around her body, unleash potentially lethal beams and much more, as soon as she concentrates enough to fully manifest it. Immacolata mentions at one point that only women can wield the menstruum (as does Suzanna later) and also that this force has driven many women mad and/or suicidal. The term itself seems to come from the same word which denotes the initial flow of menstrual blood (thus reaffirming the association of this power with womanhood). She also possesses several spells as well as the ability of seeing visions and communicating telepathically with her sisters. She is also able to summon several abominations and half-aborted monsters and control them. Additionally, she can attempt to alter the nature of certain objects, thanks to the menstruum. Because of her magical abilities and the menstruum, she did not age (she remained biologically young, although she was already hundreds of years old). Thanks to her necromantic abilities (she can summon the phantasms whose souls she has collected, including her sisters') she also possibly became a ghost herself following her death, finally joining her sisters in the same plane.
