= Princess Maria Immaculata of Bourbon-Two Sicilies =

Princess Maria Immaculata of Bourbon-Two Sicilies may refer to:

- Princess Maria Immaculata of Bourbon-Two Sicilies (1844–1899), daughter of Ferdinand II of the Two Sicilies and Maria Theresa of Austria
- Princess Maria Immaculata of Bourbon-Two Sicilies (1874–1947), daughter of Prince Alfonso, Count of Caserta and Princess Antonietta of Bourbon-Two Sicilies

== See also ==
- Princess Maria Immacolata of Bourbon-Two Sicilies
