= Immaculata High School (Chicago) =

- U.S. National Register of Historic Places
- Chicago Landmark
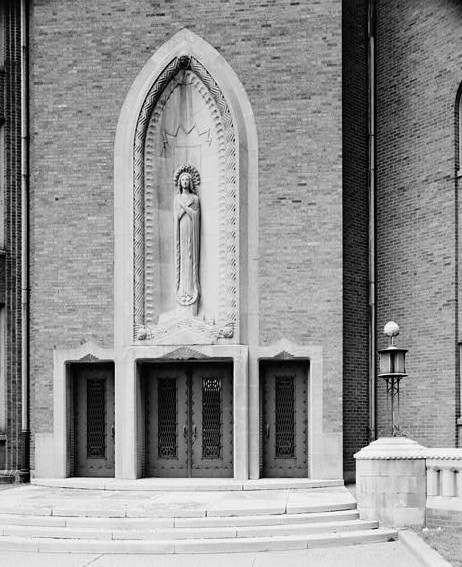
- 1964 HABS

- Location within Chicago metropolitan area Location within Illinois Location within the United States
- Location: 600 W. Irving Park Rd., Chicago, Illinois
- Coordinates: 41°57′18″N 87°38′45″W
- Built: 1921
- Architect: Byrne, Barry
- Architectural style: Moderne
- NRHP reference No.: 77000476

Significant dates
- Added to NRHP: August 30, 1977
- Designated CHICL: July 27, 1983

Immaculata High School was an all-girls Catholic high school located in the Lakeview neighborhood of Chicago, Illinois. It was open from 1921 to 1981.

The building was listed on the U.S. National Register of Historic Places in 1977. It received Chicago Landmark status on July 27, 1983.

Still standing at Irving Park Road and Marine Drive, the school was designed by Prairie School architect Barry Byrne, a onetime apprentice of Frank Lloyd Wright. The sculpture of Mary above the entrance, now removed, was the work of frequent Byrne collaborator Alfonso Iannelli.

The Immaculata High School records are currently housed at the Women and Leadership Archives.

Mildred Agnes (née Martínez) Prevost, the mother of Pope Leo XIV, attended the high school.
