= Immaculata Preparatory School =

Location
- Washington, D.C. (1905–1986); Rockville, Maryland (1986–1991); United States; 38.9456°N 77.0806°W

Information
- Other names: Immaculata Seminary; Immaculata High School; Immaculata Junior College; Immaculata College High School
- Type: Private, college-prep
- Motto: Virtus cum Scientia (Latin) ("Virtue and Knowledge United")
- Religious affiliations: Roman Catholic; Sisters of Providence of Saint Mary-of-the-Woods
- Established: 1905
- Closed: 1991
- School district: Archdiocese of Washington Catholic Schools
- Gender: Girls
- Color: Blue
- Accreditation: Middle States Association of Colleges and Schools
- Newspaper: The Immaculata News
- Yearbook: Guerin
- Website: www.immaculatadc.org

Immaculata Preparatory School, later Immaculata College High School, was a private all-girls Catholic school that operated in the Washington, D.C. area from 1905 to 1991.

== History ==
Immaculata Seminary was opened by the Sisters of Providence of Saint Mary-of-the-Woods in 1905 in the Tenleytown neighborhood of Washington, D.C.

After plans were made to close the school and sell the campus to American University in 1984, a group of parents successfully sued the Sisters of Providence in order to keep the school open. Immaculata then moved to Rockville, Maryland, where it operated as Immaculata College High School until 1991.

== Notable alumnae ==
- Maeve Brennan, '36
- Maureen Dowd, '70
- Regina Hall, '88
- Patricia McGerr, '33

== In popular culture ==
- In his 1917 book, The Profits of Religion, Upton Sinclair mentions Immaculata Seminary among a list of Catholic schools and colleges with "strange titles."
- During his 2018 confirmation hearings, Brett Kavanaugh described socializing with friends from Catholic all-girls high schools, including Immaculata.
