= Immaculata Regional High School =

Location
- 1493 K.L.O. Road; Kelowna, British Columbia, V1W 3N8; Canada; 49.86038°N 119.46556°W

Information
- School type: Independent
- Religious affiliation: Roman Catholic
- Founded: 1960
- School board: Kelowna Catholic Independent School Council
- Superintendent: Mrs. Pamela Guilbault
- Area trustee: Most Rev. John Corriveau (Archbishop's Representative)
- Principal: Mr. Bruno Oliveira (acting)
- Grades: 8-12
- Enrollment: 260
- Language: English
- Colours: Green and Gold
- Team name: Mustangs
- Website: www.immaculatakelowna.ca

Immaculata Regional High School is a Roman Catholic high school situated in Kelowna, B.C., Canada. It was under the direction of the Kelowna Catholic Independent School Council. The school is co-educational, offering academic, fine arts, a heavy focus on science programs, as well as strong athletic, performing arts, and other extracurricular programs, for students from grades 8 to 12. The school participates in sporting events under the name of the "Mustangs", with the team colours of green and gold.

== History ==
In 1860, Father Pandosy is credited with the Catholic education in Central Okanagan.

In 1938, the Sisters of Charity of Halifax began formal instruction. By September 1950, St. Joseph's Elementary School officially opened for instruction of grades K-7. With the completion of Immaculata High School in 1960.

In September 1995, through the perseverance of Bishop Peter Mallon a new High School, renamed Immaculata Regional High School, was opened. The new facility can house 350 students.

== Independent school status ==
Immaculata Regional High School is classified as a Group 1 school under British Columbia's Independent School Act. It receives 50% funding from the Ministry of Education. The school receives no funding for capital costs. It is under charge of the Kelowna Catholic Independent School Council.

Feeder Schools & Parishes
St. Joseph Catholic School (Kelowna)
Our Lady of Lourdes School (West Kelowna)
Holy Cross Elementary (Penticton)
St. James Catholic Elem. School (Vernon)
Holy Spirit Parish
Our Lady of Lourdes Parish
St. Theresa's Parish
St. Edward's Parish
Immaculate Conception Parish
St. Charles Garnier Parish
St. Pius X Parish
Ukrainian Catholic Church of the Assumption of the Blessed Virgin Mary

== Academic performance ==
Immaculata Regional High School is ranked by the Fraser Institute. In 2018, it was ranked 143rd out of 251 BC secondary schools.

Immaculata was ranked 33/252 BC high schools in 2020 by the Fraser Institute. It received a score of 7.9 out of 10 during this time period.

== Notable alumni ==
- Josh Gorges, former NHL player for the San Jose Sharks, Montreal Canadiens, and Buffalo Sabres
- Kierra Smith, breaststroke swimmer for Canada's Olympic team
