= Immaculata High School (Kansas) =

Location
- 600 Shawnee Street; Leavenworth, Kansas 66048; United States
- 39°19′8″N 94°55′3″W

Information
- Type: Private, Coeducational
- Religious affiliations: Roman Catholic; Sisters of Charity of Leavenworth
- Established: 1912
- Founder: Bernard S. Kelly
- Status: Closed June 2, 2017
- School board: BOE Website
- School district: Leavenworth Regional Catholic Schools
- Oversight: Archdiocese of Kansas City
- School code: 00489021
- Principal: Richard Geraci
- Grades: 7–12
- Gender: Coed
- Colors: Green; White
- Athletics: KSHSAA
- Athletics conference: Northeast Kansas League
- Sports: Yes
- Mascot: Raider
- Nickname: IMAC
- Team name: Raiders
- Accreditation: North Central Association of Colleges and Schools
- Communities served: Leavenworth, Kansas
- Affiliation: Roman Catholic
- Website: School Website

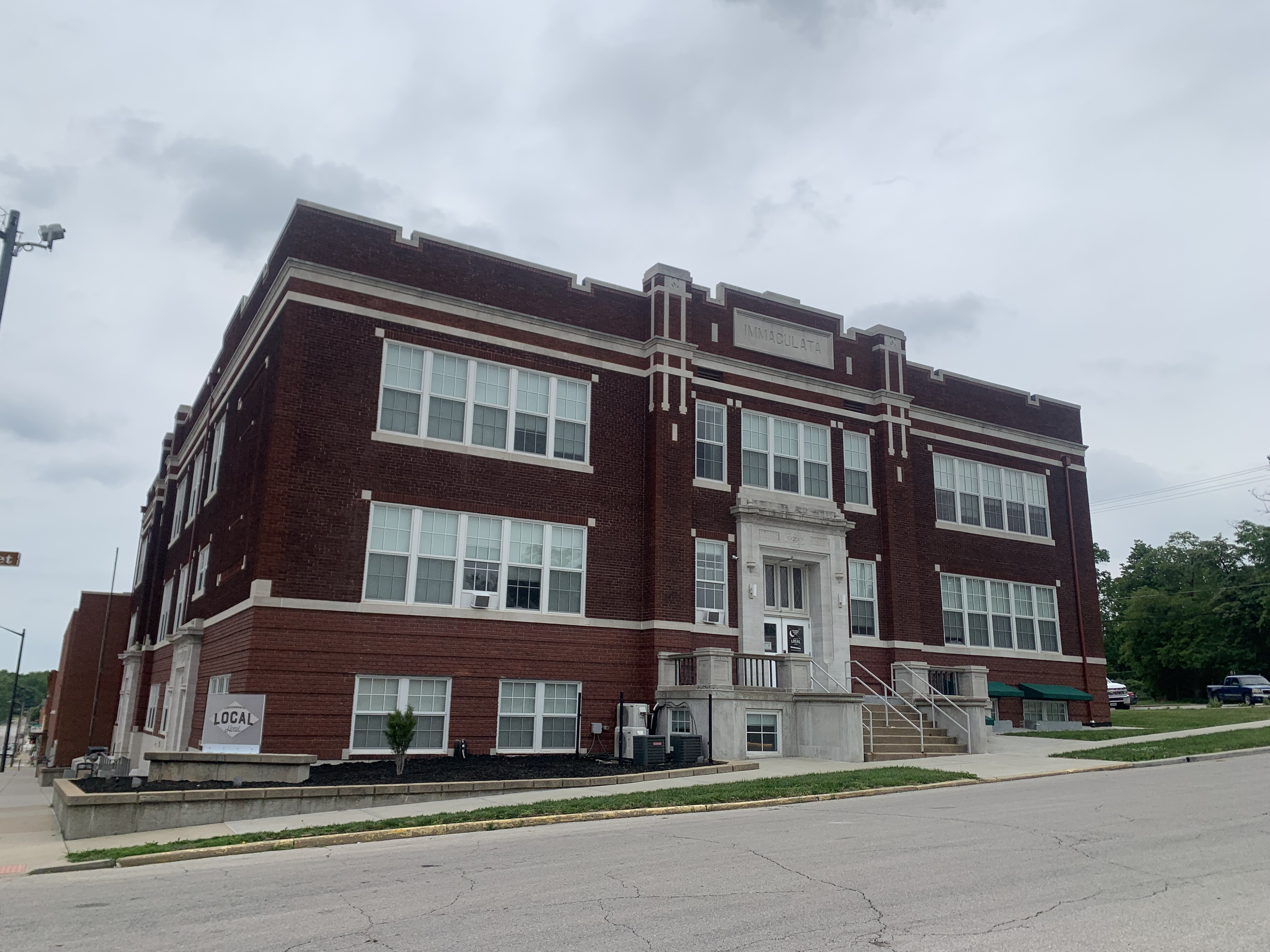
Immaculata High School building

Immaculata High School was a private, Roman Catholic high school in Leavenworth, Kansas, United States. It was located in the Roman Catholic Archdiocese of Kansas City in Kansas.

== History ==
Immaculata High School officially closed its doors on June 2, 2017, due to continuing enrollment problems and rising tuition costs.

== Extracurricular Activities ==
The Raiders competed in the Northeast Kansas League and were classified as a 1A school, the smallest classification in Kansas according to the Kansas State High School Activities Association.

=== Athletics ===
Immaculata High School was a member of the Kansas State High School Activities Association and participated in the Northeast Kansas League.
Below, are sports that were offered at the school.

Boys' Athletic Teams

- Baseball
- Basketball
- Football
- Soccer
- Tennis
- Wrestling

Girls' Athletic Teams

- Basketball
- Cheerleading
- Pom Squad
- Softball
- Tennis
- Volleyball

Co-ed Athletic Teams

- Golf
- Powerlifting
- Track & Field

=== Clubs & Organizations ===
Immaculata High School offered a variety of clubs/organizations for the students. A list of clubs that were offered, are listed below:

- Art Club
- Band
- Choir
- IMAC Singers
- International Club
- National Honor Society
- Scholar's Bowl
- Spanish Honor Society
- Student Council
- Student Who Cares

== Notable alumni ==
- Johnny Hetki, former MLB player (Cincinnati Reds, St. Louis Browns, Pittsburgh Pirates)
