= 7th federal electoral district of San Luis Potosí =

Federal electoral district of Mexico

San Luis Potosí's 7th
- Electoral district of the Chamber of Deputies of Mexico

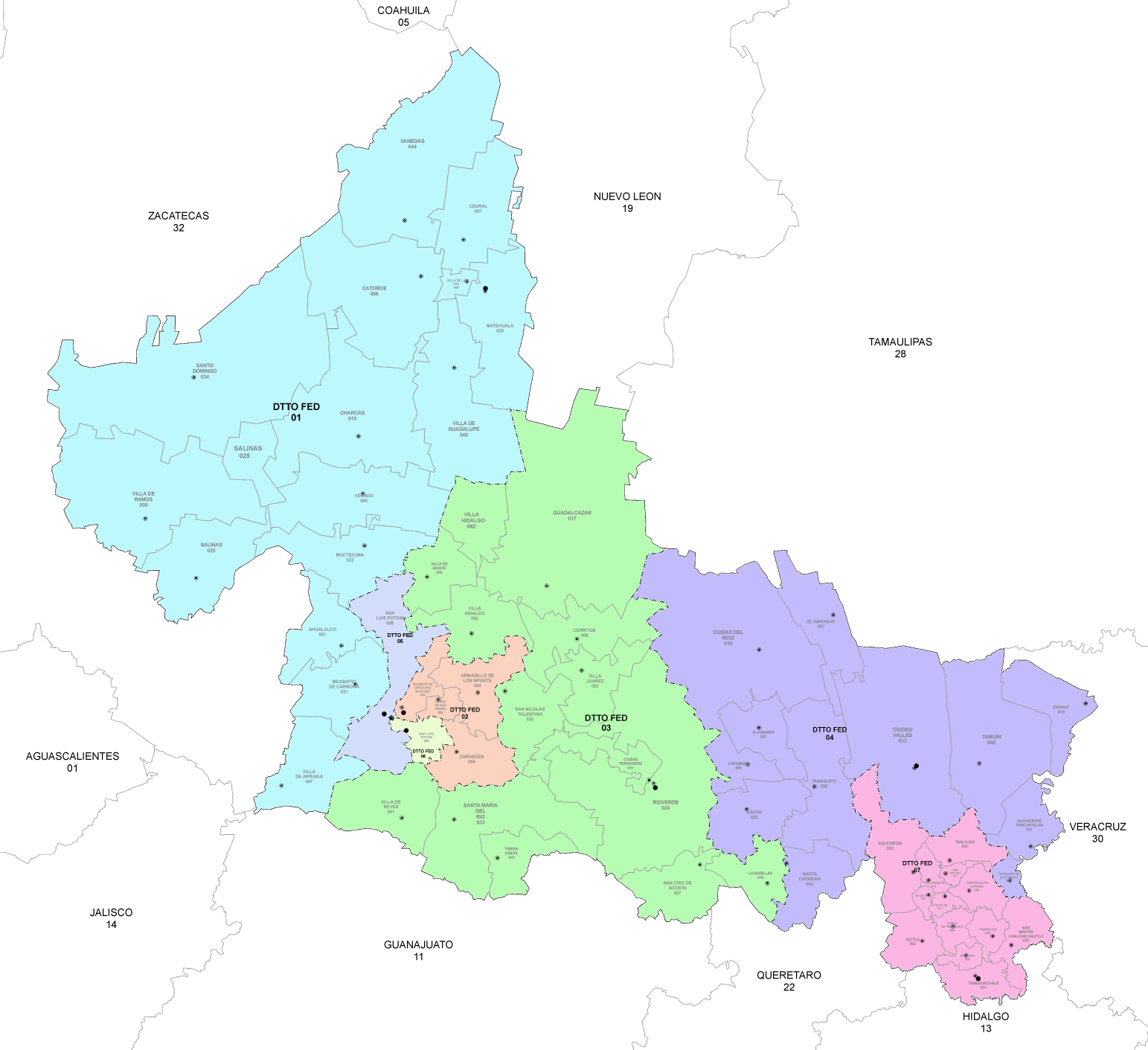
- 7th district since 2023

Incumbent
- Member: Briceyda García Antonio
- Party: ▌Morena
- Congress: 66th (2024–2027)

District
- State: San Luis Potosí
- Head town: Tamazunchale
- Coordinates: 21°16′N 98°47′W
- Covers: 13 municipalities: Aquismón, Axtla de Terrazas, Coxcatlán, Huehuetlán, Matlapa, San Antonio, San Martín Chalchicuautla, Tamazunchale, Tampacán, Tampamolón, Tancanhuitz, Tanlajás, Xilitla
- PR region: Second
- Precincts: 285
- Population: 379,671 (2020 census)
- Indigenous: Yes (80%)

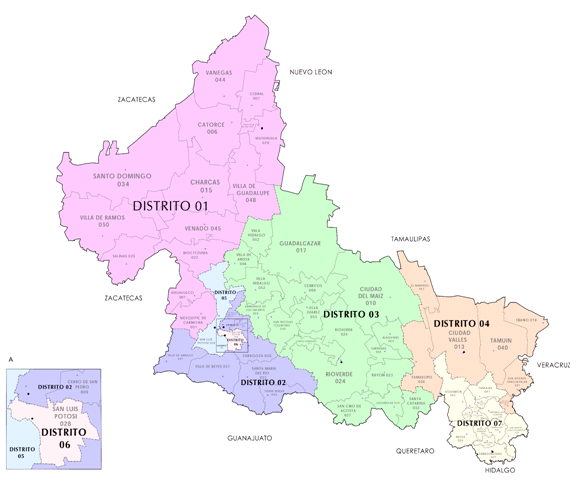
San Luis Potosí under the 2017–2022 scheme

The 7th federal electoral district of San Luis Potosí (Spanish: Distrito electoral federal 07 de San Luis Potosí) is one of the 300 electoral districts into which Mexico is divided for elections to the federal Chamber of Deputies and one of seven such districts in the state of San Luis Potosí.

It elects one deputy to the lower house of Congress for each three-year legislative session by means of the first-past-the-post system. Votes cast in the district also count towards the calculation of proportional representation ("plurinominal") deputies elected from the second region.

Suspended in 1943, (Note: The members' register for the 38th Congress (1940–1943) reports a 7th district in San Luis Potosí, but the one for the 39th Congress (1943–1946) does not.) the 7th district was re-established as part of the 1977 electoral reforms, which increased the number of single-member seats in the Chamber of Deputies from 196 to 300. Under that plan, San Luis Potosí's seat allocation rose from five to seven. The two new districts were first contested in the 1979 legislative election.

The current member for the district, elected in the 2024 general election, is Briceyda García Antonio of the National Regeneration Movement (Morena).

== District territory ==
Under the 2023 districting plan adopted by the National Electoral Institute (INE), which is to be used for the 2024, 2027 and 2030 federal elections, the 7th district is in the extreme south-east of the state, covering much of its Huasteca region. It comprises 285 electoral precincts (secciones electorales) across 13 of the state's municipalities:

- Aquismón, Axtla de Terrazas, Coxcatlán, Huehuetlán, Matlapa, San Antonio, San Martín Chalchicuautla, Tamazunchale, Tampacán, Tampamolón, Tancanhuitz, Tanlajás and Xilitla.

The district's head town (cabecera distrital), where results from individual polling stations are gathered together and tallied, is the city of Tamazunchale.

The district reported a population of 379,671 in the 2020 census. With Indigenous and Afrodescendent inhabitants accounting for over 80% of that total, it is classified by the INE as an indigenous district – the only indigenous federal electoral district in the state. (Note: The INE deems any local or federal electoral district where Indigenous or Afrodescendent inhabitants number 40% or more of the population to be an indigenous district. While the 7th is the state's only indigenous federal electoral district, three of the 15 single-member districts that elect deputies to the Congress of San Luis Potosí are classified as indigenous.)

== Previous districting schemes ==
Evolution of electoral district numbers
| | 1974 | 1978 | 1996 | 2005 | 2017 | 2023 |
|---|---|---|---|---|---|---|
| San Luis Potosí | 5 | 7 | 7 | 7 | 7 | 7 |
| Chamber of Deputies | 196 | 300 | | | | |

2017–2022

Between 2017 and 2022, the district had the same configuration as in the 2023 plan.

2005–2017

Under the 2005 districting plan, the district comprised the same 13 municipalities as in the later plans.

1996–2005

From 1996 to 2005, the district covered ten municipalities: the same grouping as the later plans but without San Antonio, Tampamolón and Tanlajás.

1978–1996

The districting scheme in force from 1978 to 1996 was the result of the 1977 electoral reforms, which increased the number of single-member seats in the Chamber of Deputies from 196 to 300. Under that plan, San Luis Potosí's seat allocation rose from five to seven. The re-established seventh district's head town was the city of Tamazunchale and it covered the municipalities of Ciudad Santos, Coxcatlán, Huehuetlán, San Martín Chalchicuautla, Tamazunchale, Tampacán, Tanquián de Escobedo, Villa Terrazas and Xilitla.

== Deputies returned to Congress ==
(Mexico) National parties
- Current
- PAN
- PRI
- PT
- PVEM
- MC
- Morena
- PAZ
- Somos
- Defunct or local only
- PLM
- PNR
- PRM
- PNM
- PP
- PPS
- PARM
- PFCRN
- CON
- PANAL
- PSD
- PES
- PES
- PRD

San Luis Potosí's 7th district
| Election | Deputy | Party | Term | Legislature |
|---|---|---|---|---|
| 1916 | Julián Ramírez y Martínez | | 1916–1917 | Constituent Congress of Querétaro |
...
| 1979 | José Ramón Martell López | Institutional Revolutionary Party | 1979–1982 | 51st Congress |
| 1982 | Helios Barragán López | Institutional Revolutionary Party | 1982–1985 | 52nd Congress |
| 1985 | Román González Ayala | Institutional Revolutionary Party | 1985–1988 | 53rd Congress |
| 1988 | Rebeca Guevara de Terán | Institutional Revolutionary Party | 1988–1991 | 54th Congress |
| 1991 | Felipe Aurelio Torres Torres | Institutional Revolutionary Party | 1991–1994 | 55th Congress |
| 1994 | Miguel Ortiz Jonguitud | Institutional Revolutionary Party | 1994–1997 | 56th Congress |
| 1997 | Crisógono Sánchez Lara | Institutional Revolutionary Party | 1997–2000 | 57th Congress |
| 2000 | Justino Hernández Hilaria | Institutional Revolutionary Party | 2000–2003 | 58th Congress |
| 2003 | Benjamín Sagahón Medina (Note: Originally elected for the PRI, on 16 January 2006 Sagahón Medina declared himself an independent.) | Institutional Revolutionary Party Independent politician | 2003–2006 | 59th Congress |
| 2006 | José Guadalupe Rivera Rivera | National Action Party (Mexico) | 2006–2009 | 60th Congress |
| 2009 | Sabino Bautista Concepción | Institutional Revolutionary Party | 2009–2012 | 61st Congress |
| 2012 | María Rebeca Terán Guevara | Institutional Revolutionary Party | 2012–2015 | 62nd Congress |
| 2015 | Christian Joaquín Sánchez Sánchez | Institutional Revolutionary Party | 2015–2018 | 63rd Congress |
| 2018 | Marcelino Rivera Hernández | National Action Party (Mexico) | 2018–2021 | 64th Congress |
| 2021 | Christian Joaquín Sánchez Sánchez | Ecologist Green Party of Mexico | 2021–2024 | 65th Congress |
| 2024 | Briceyda García Antonio | National Regeneration Movement | 2024–2027 | 66th Congress |

== Presidential elections ==
San Luis Potosí's 7th district
| Election | District won by | Party or coalition | % |
|---|---|---|---|
| 2018 | Andrés Manuel López Obrador | Juntos Haremos Historia | 42.6737 |
| 2024 | Claudia Sheinbaum Pardo | Sigamos Haciendo Historia | 71.5831 |
