= Briceyda García Antonio =

Mexican politician, born 1988

- Born: 11 January 1988 (age 38); Axtla de Terrazas, San Luis Potosí, Mexico
- Education: UASLP
- Occupation: Politician
- Political party: Morena

Federal deputy for San Luis Potosí's 7th
- Incumbent
- Assumed office 1 September 2024
- Website: SIL

Briceyda García Antonio (Note: In this Mexican name, the surname is García and the second or maternal family name is Antonio.) (born 11 January 1988) is a Mexican politician affiliated with the National Regeneration Movement (Morena).

García Antonio was born in Axtla de Terrazas, San Luis Potosí, in 1988. She holds a bachelor's degree in administration from the Autonomous University of San Luis Potosí (UASLP). Between 2006 and 2014, including while she was at university, she worked for the Cinépolis cinema chain in the city of San Luis Potosí.

From 2018 to 2023, she held a position as one the federal Secretariat of Welfare's regional directors, with responsibility for 13 of the state's municipalities.

In the 2024 general election she was elected to the Chamber of Deputies to represent San Luis Potosí's 7th district (Tamazunchale) during the 66th session of Congress. As the candidate of the Sigamos Haciendo Historia coalition, she won the election with over 70% of the votes cast in a three-way race. In Congress, she serves on the lower house's committees for rural and agricultural development and conservation and self-sufficiency in foodstuffs; for Indigenous and Afrodescendent populations; and for oversight of the Superior Auditor of the Federation. She also chairs the group of friends of the Republic of Nigeria.
