= Sabino Bautista Concepción =

Mexican politician

- Born: 30 August 1963 (age 62); San Martín Chalchicuautla, San Luis Potosí, Mexico
- Occupation: Politician
- Political party: PRI

Sabino Bautista Concepción (born 30 August 1963) is a Mexican politician from the Institutional Revolutionary Party (PRI).

Bautista Concepción was born in San Martín Chalchicuautla, San Luis Potosí, in 1963. He served as municipal president of San Martín Chalchicuautla from 2004 to 2006 before serving as a local deputy in the 58th session of the Congress of San Luis Potosí (2006–2009).

In the 2009 mid-terms he was elected to the Chamber of Deputies to represent San Luis Potosí's 7th congressional district during the 61st session of Congress.
