= Justino Hernández Hilaria =

Mexican politician

- Born: 14 April 1955 (age 71); Tamazunchale, San Luis Potosí, Mexico
- Occupation: Politician
- Political party: PRI

Justino Hernández Hilaria (born 14 April 1955) is a Mexican politician from the Institutional Revolutionary Party (PRI).

Hernández Hilaria was born in Tamazunchale, San Luis Potosí, in 1955. He served as municipal president of Tamazunchale from 1991 to 1994 and as a local deputy in the 55th session of the Congress of San Luis Potosí (1997–2000).

In the 2000 general election he was elected to the Chamber of Deputies to represent San Luis Potosí's 7th district during the 58th session of Congress.

Preceded by	Municipal President of Tamazunchale, San Luis Potosí; 1991–1994	Succeeded by
