= Rebeca Terán Guevara =

Mexican politician

- Born: 7 March 1960 (age 66); Xilitla, San Luis Potosí, Mexico
- Occupation: Politician
- Political party: PRI

María Rebeca Terán Guevara (born 7 March 1960) is a Mexican politician affiliated with the Institutional Revolutionary Party (PRI).

Terán Guevara was born in Xilitla, San Luis Potosí, in 1960. She holds a bachelor's and a master's in primary school education. In the 2012 general election she was elected to the Chamber of Deputies to represent San Luis Potosí's 7th congressional district during the 62nd session of Congress (2012–2015).
