= Nuestra Belleza San Luis Potosí 2012 =

- Date: June 23, 2012
- Presenters: Sarahí Carrillo
- Venue: Ex-Convento Agustino, Xilitla, San Luis Potosí
- Broadcaster: Televisa
- Entrants: 6
- Placements: 2
- Winner: Verónica Sánchez; San Luis Potosí

Nuestra Belleza San Luis Potosí 2012, was held at the Ex-Convento Agustino of Xilitla, San Luis Potosí on June 23, 2012. At the conclusion of the final night of competition Verónica Sánchez from San Luis Potosí City was crowned the winner. Sánchez was crowned by the Secretary of Tourism Enrique Abud Dip and the Mayor Xilitla Carlos Llamazares. Six contestants competed for the title.

== Results ==
=== Placements ===
Final results	Contestant
Nuestra Belleza San Luis Potosí 2012	Verónica Sánchez
Suplente / 1st Runner-up	Fernanda Barbosa

== Contestants ==
Hometown	Contestant
Ciudad Valles	Lorely Pañola Martínez
Rioverde	Mónica Pérez Robledo
San Luis Potosí	Verónica Sánchez Alonso
San Luis Potosí	Nicole González Mañaga
San Luis Potosí	Sandy Flores Córdova
San Luis Potosí	María Fernanda Barbosa Gutiérrez
