= José Guadalupe Rivera Rivera =

Mexican politician

- Born: 12 December 1951 (age 74); San Luis Potosí, Mexico
- Occupation: Politician
- Political party: PAN

José Guadalupe Rivera Rivera (born 12 December 1951) is a Mexican politician from the National Action Party (PAN).

In the 2006 general election he was elected to the Chamber of Deputies to represent San Luis Potosí's 7th district during the 60th session of Congress (2006–2009). He was previously a local deputy in the 58th session of the Congress of San Luis Potosí (2003–2006).
