= Benjamín Sagahón =

Mexican politician

- Born: 14 January 1960 (age 66); San Luis Potosí, Mexico
- Occupation: Politician
- Political party: PRI (1980s–2006); PRD (2006–present)

Benjamín Sagahón Medina (born 14 January 1960) is a Mexican politician affiliated with the Party of the Democratic Revolution (PRD) who previously belonged to the Institutional Revolutionary Party (PRI).

He served as municipal president of Matlapa, San Luis Potosí, from 1997 to 2000.

In the 2003 mid-terms he was elected to the Chamber of Deputies for the PRI to represent San Luis Potosí's 7th district during the 59th session of Congress. On 16 January 2006 he declared himself an independent "in order to give his full support to Andrés Manuel López Obrador in his campaign for the 2006 presidential election".
