= Nuestra Belleza San Luis Potosí 2010 =

- Date: July 31, 2010
- Presenters: Carolina Jaime Foyo, Alejandro Alarcón.
- Venue: Ex Convento de San Agustín, Xilitla, San Luis Potosí
- Broadcaster: Televisa
- Entrants: 7
- Placements: 4
- Winner: Carmen Hernández

Nuestra Belleza San Luis Potosí 2010, was held in Ex Convento de San Agustín, Xilitla, San Luis Potosí on July 31, 2010. At the conclusion of the final night of competition, Carmen Hernández of the capital city San Luis Potosí was crowned the winner. Hernández was crowned by outgoing Nuestra Belleza San Luis Potosí titleholder, Sarahí Carrillo. Seven contestants competed for the state title.

== Results ==
=== Placements ===
Final results	Contestant
Nuestra Belleza San Luis Potosí 2010	Carmen Hernández
Suplente / 1st Runner-up	Paola Lastras
Finalists	Chintia Ávalos; Iris Yesenia Guerrero

== Judges ==
- Patricia Drogueras - Contests Regional Coordinator of Nuestra Belleza México
- Dr. Ángel Franco - Organizer for Mexico of Miss America Latina
- Cesar Hache - Broker International of Bogamodels
- Abraham Palomo - Photographer
- César Torres - Plastic Surgeon
- Miguel Sánchez - Painter

== Contestants ==
Contestant
Brenda Vianney Martínez Gámez
Carmen Isabel Hernández Chávez
Cinthia Guadalupe Ávalos Santos
Iris Yesenia Guerrero Izaguirre
Isaura Alba Barba
Olga Marisol Cruz Silva
Ana Paola Lastras Villaseñor

== Contestants Notes ==
- Carmen Hernández competed in the second Reina Internacional del Transporte pageant in Duitama, Colombia in January 2011 and won the Crown. At the time of her crown, broke the dress, revealing a breast for what the public immediately set his sights on it. Also she won the right to represent Mexico in Miss Princess of the World 2011 will be held in France.
- Paola Lastras was invited by the Nuestra Belleza México organization to participate in the National Contest.
