= Las Pozas =

Surrealist sculpture garden in Mexican rainforest created by Edward James 1949 - 1984

Coordinates: 21.3970°N 98.9970°W

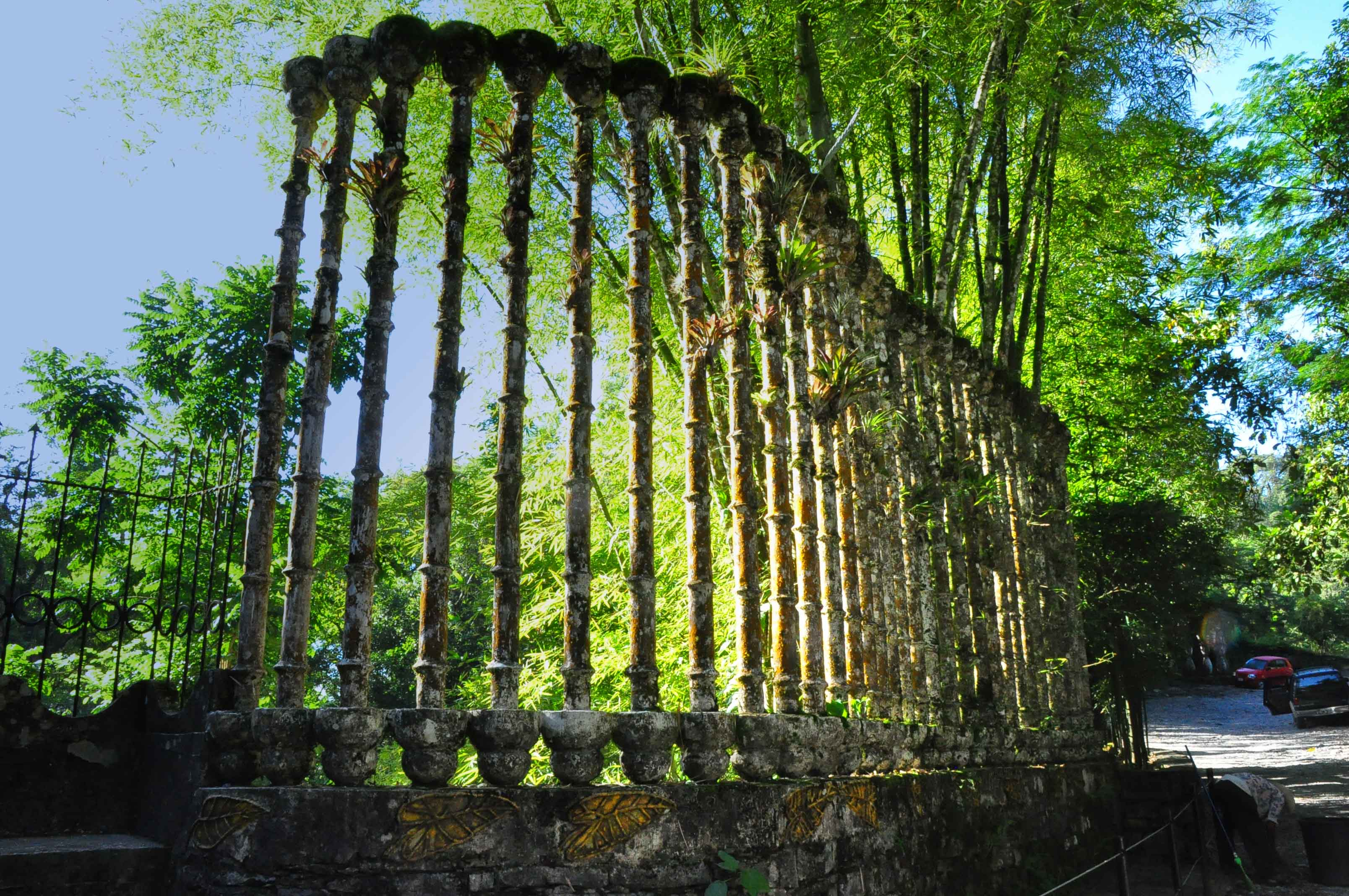
Las Pozas, Xilitla, San Luis Potosí, Mexico, 24 September 2011

Las Pozas ("the Pools") is a surrealistic group of structures created by Edward James, more than 2,000 feet (610 m) above sea level, in a subtropical rainforest in the Sierra Gorda mountains of Mexico. It includes more than 80 acres (32 ha) of natural waterfalls and pools interlaced with towering surrealist sculptures in concrete.

== Location and conception ==
Las Pozas is near the village of Xilitla, San Luis Potosí, a seven-hour drive north of Mexico City. In the early 1940s, James went to Los Angeles, California, and then decided that he "wanted a Garden of Eden set up . . . and I saw that Mexico was far more romantic" and had "far more room than there is in crowded Southern California". In Hollywood in 1941, his lifetime friend and cousin, Magic Realist painter Bridget Bate Tichenor, encouraged him to search for a surreal location in Mexico to express his diverse esoteric interests. In Cuernavaca, he hired Plutarco Gastélum Esquer, a Yaqui indian who was a photographer, as a guide. They came to know Xilitla in November 1945. Eventually, Plutarco got married and had four children. James was "Uncle Edward" to the children and frequently stayed with them in a house Plutarco had built, a mock-Gothic cement castle, now a hotel – La Posada El Castillo.

== Construction ==
Between 1949 and 1984, James built scores of surreal concrete structures which carry names such as The House on Three Floors Which Will in Fact Have Five or Four or Six, The House with a Roof like a Whale, and The Staircase to Heaven. There were also plantings and beds full of tropical plants, including orchids — there were, apparently, 29,000 at Las Pozas at one time — and a variety of small homes, niches, and pens that held exotic birds and wild animals from the world over. James owned many exotic animals and once even took his pet boa constrictors to the Hotel Francis in Mexico City.

Massive sculptures up to four stories tall punctuate the site. The many trails throughout the garden site are composed of steps, ramps, bridges and narrow, winding walkways that traverse the valley walls. Construction of Las Pozas cost more than $5 million. To pay for it, James sold his collection of surrealistic art at auction.

In the construction of the structures, large numbers of workers were always needed. It is said for an average project over 40 masons, carpenters, bricklayers and blacksmiths were needed. From the beginning of La Pozas to the death of Edward James it is estimated he employed over 100 local workers.

Upon hearing of James’ death, Plutarco Gastélum halted construction of Las Pozas leaving several structures unfinished.

== Surrealism ==
Edward James had a passion for the surrealism style and he believed he was born a surrealist. He created Las Pozas as his expression of surrealism. He often emphasized how Mexico is “naturally surrealistic” and how he wanted the structures he was designing to form part of that. He went to great lengths to achieve his desired surrealistic style in creating his sculptures and at one point he also conducted electricity from the nearby town Xilitla to light up the forest.

== Design and creation ==
A significant artisan who played a large role in the creation of the concrete sculptures is Jose Aguilar, a skilled Mexican carpenter. Using the sketches and designs of Edward James he made wooden molds into which cement could be poured, and when dried would harden to the shape of the mold.

Originally, James used his land to grow orchids and create his own private zoo. For this reason, many of the original structures found in Las Pozas at one point were meant to house his pets: deer, flamingos, ducks, boa constrictors, etc. Jose Horna was the artisan who was given the job to create the cages for the boa constrictors.

Besides the structures designed for the animals, most of the structures that James created had no intended functionality; their main purpose was purely aesthetic. He often described how wanted his structures to form part of nature and/or blend into it. For this reason many of his designs were of plants, flowers, mushrooms and other natural elements. There are arches made to imitate plants like the Indian shot leaves (papatla), flowers made of concrete and birds made of concrete.

James at one point had also constructed a house made of concrete, bricks and bamboo in which he resided when he traveled to Mexico.

One of the most popular structures is the Staircase to Heaven, which refers to the concrete structure composed of columns that imitate the reproductive aspects of an orchid flower, with two staircases spiraling around them and connecting at a height of 20m.

== Ownership ==
After the death of Edward James in 1984, Las Pozas came under the ownership of Plutarco Gastélum. He met James when he first traveled to Mexico, and became responsible for Las Pozas, which he kept for a couple years in the 1980s. Gastélum had overseen construction for Las Pozas while James was not in Mexico as he was the true land owner of La Conchita. However, due to the strong financial burden of its upkeep, Gastélum was forced to take certain measures. At first, he sold parts of the land on which Las Posas resides. Due to the Mexican law that declares any waterways to be federal property, in 1994 the land was opened to the public which eventually led to its declaration as a state culture heritage site in 2006.

In the summer of 2007, the Fundación Pedro y Elena Hernández, the company Cemex, and the government of San Luis Potosí paid about $2.2 million for Las Pozas and created Fondo Xilitla, a foundation that oversees the preservation and restoration of the site.

== Tourist attraction ==
As a result of opening Las Pozas to the public in 1994, the town of Xilita began to receive a higher number of tourists.

Today, one can visit Las Pozas to see the sculptures of Edward James and also to bathe in the natural pools found in the area. Tours are available. There are several hotels surrounding the area and restaurants that surfaced as a result of the area's gain of popularity.

== Gallery ==
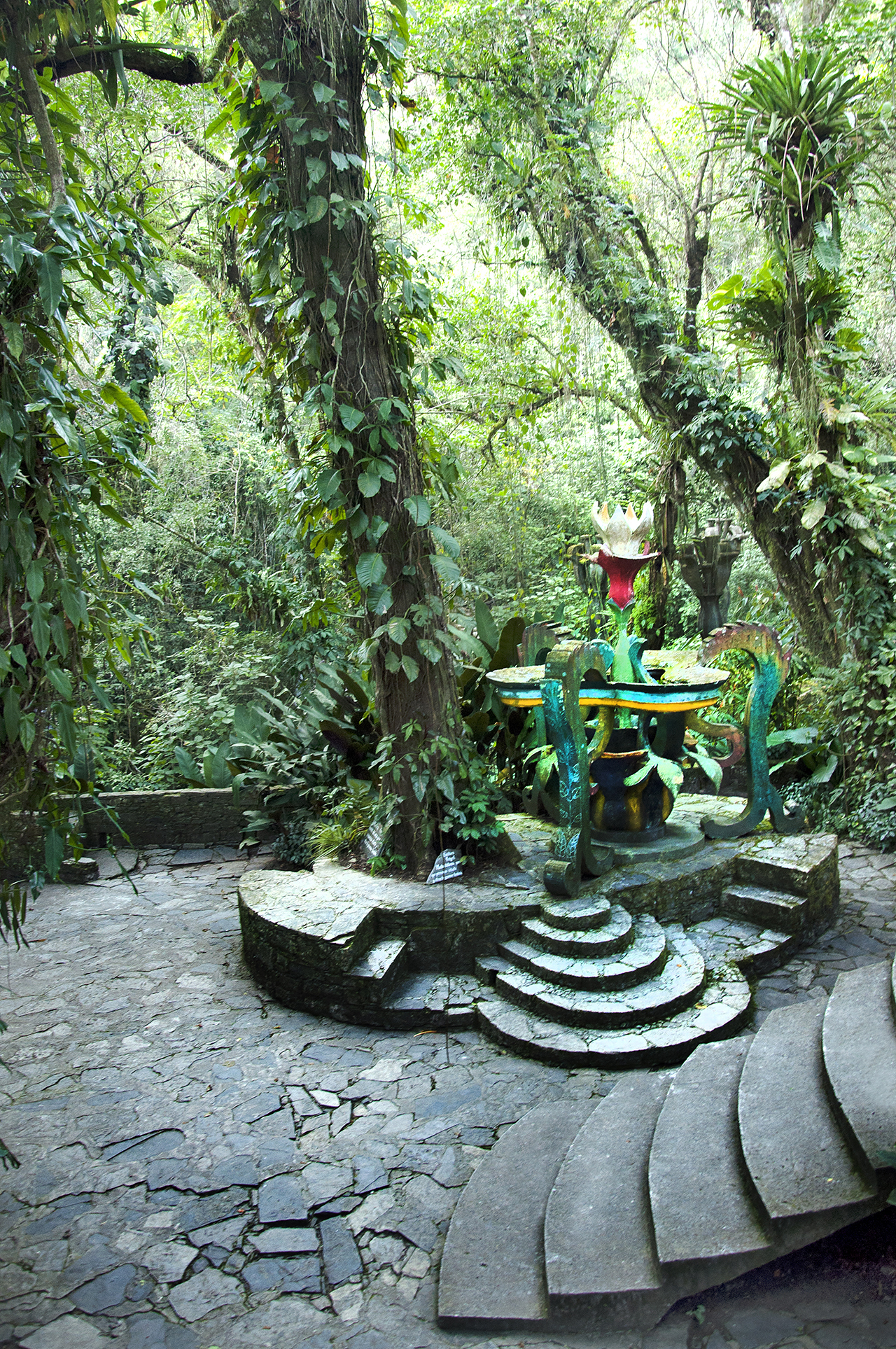
Steps and landing, Las Pozas, Xilitla, 2010

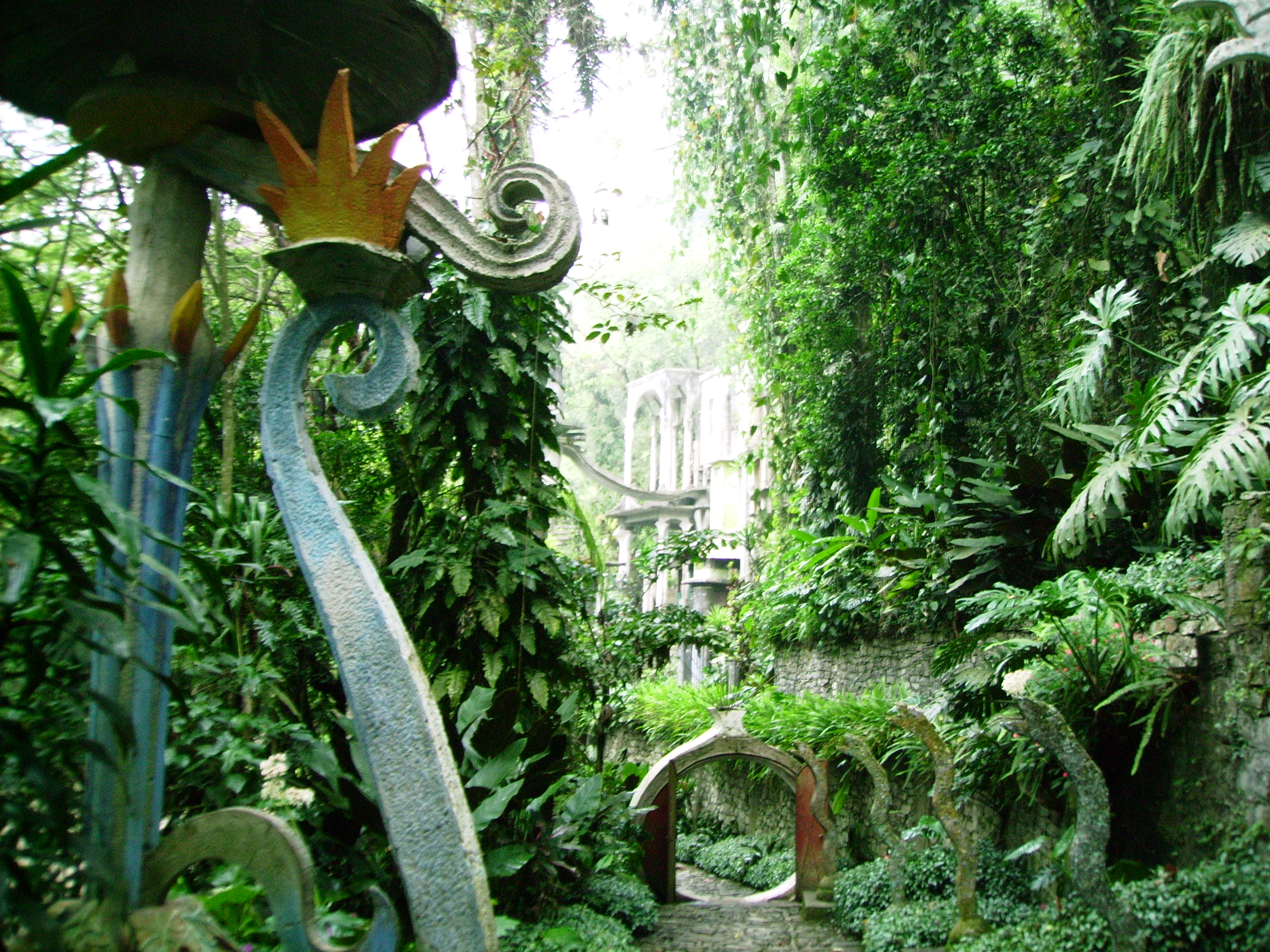
Walkway through garden, Las Pozas, Xilitla, 2007

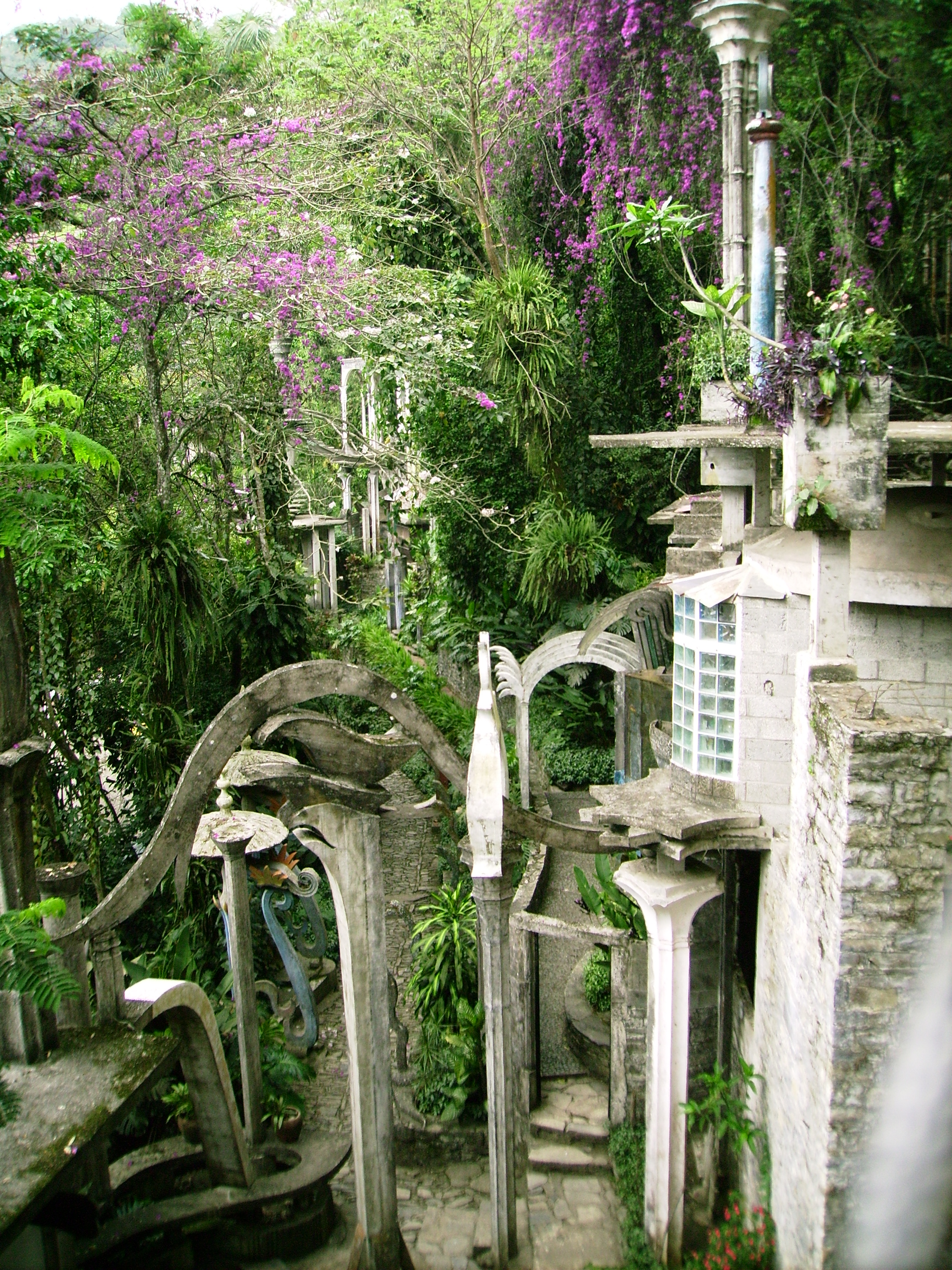
Las Pozas, Xilitla, 2007

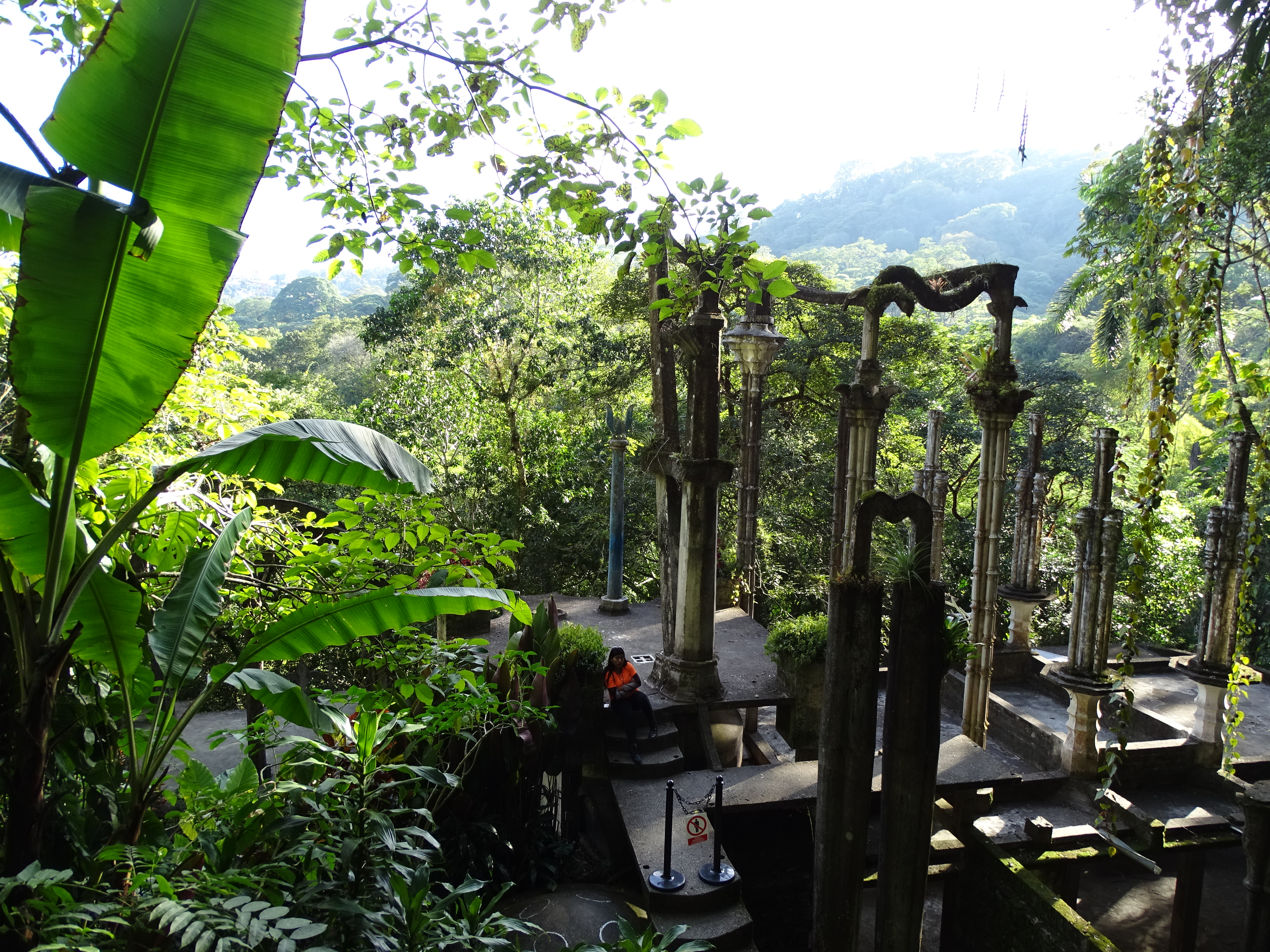
Edward James Surrealist Garden, 2018

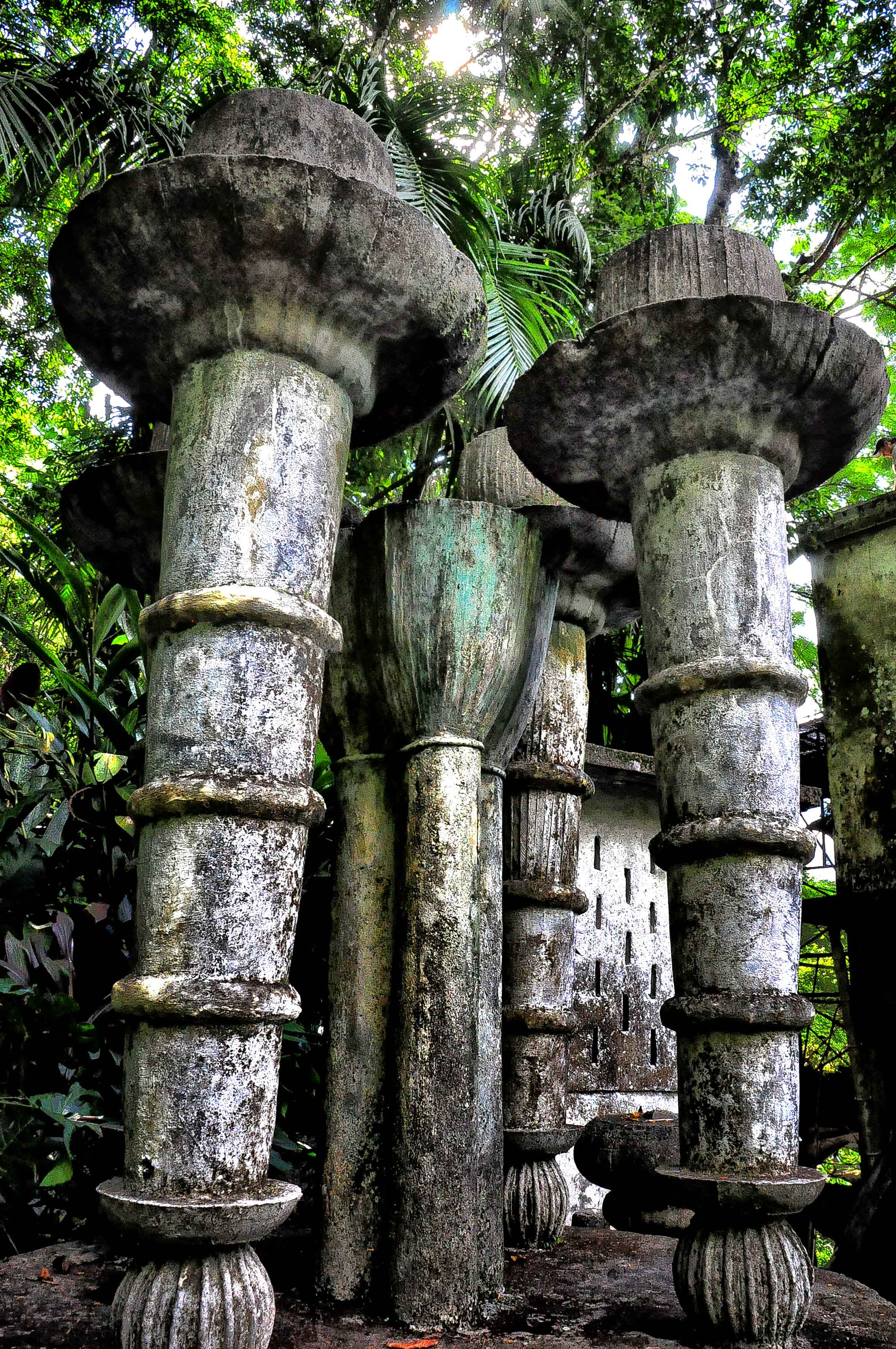
Pillars, Las Pozas, Mexico, 2012

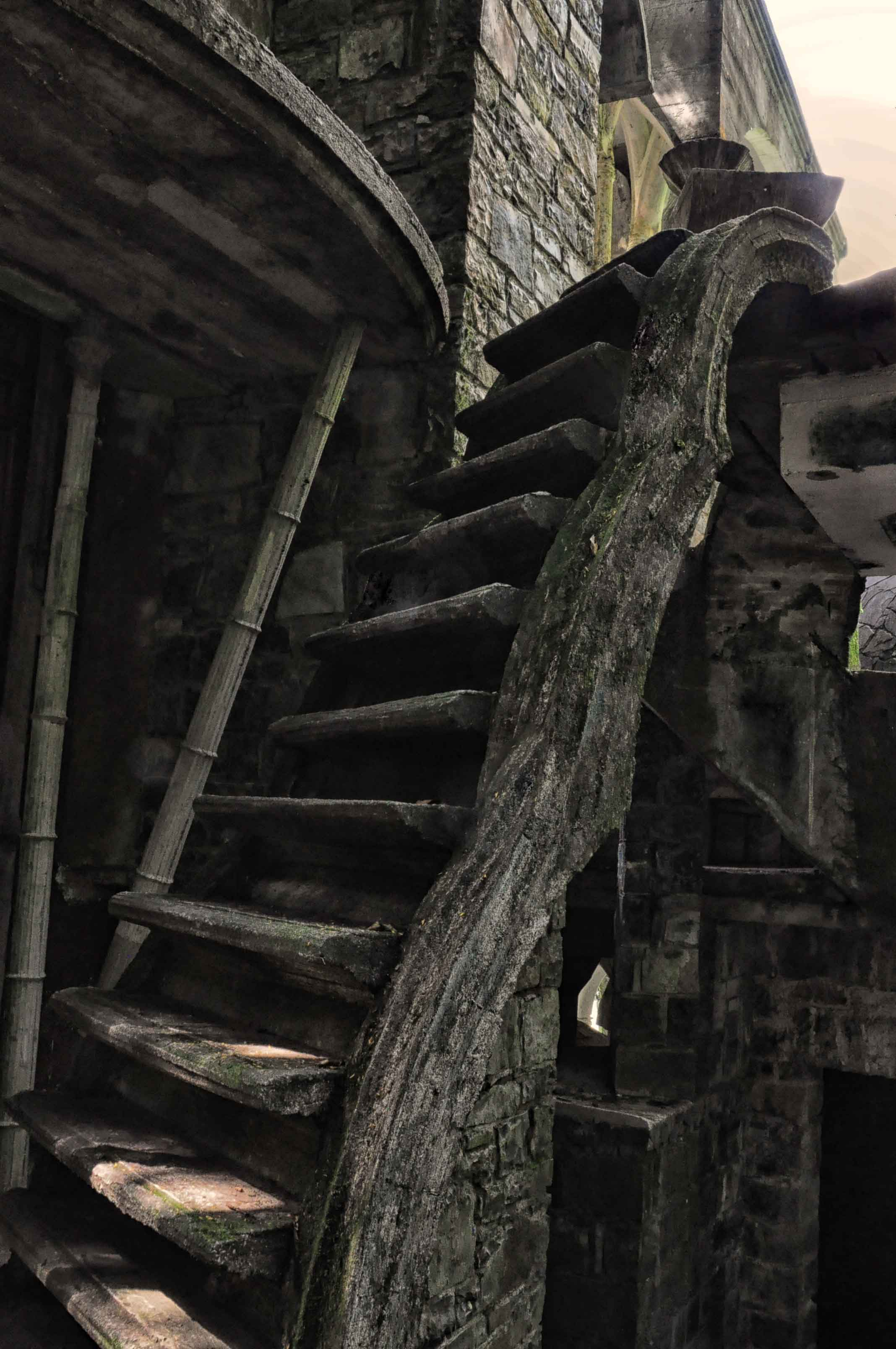
A flight of steps, Las Pozas, Xilitla, 2012

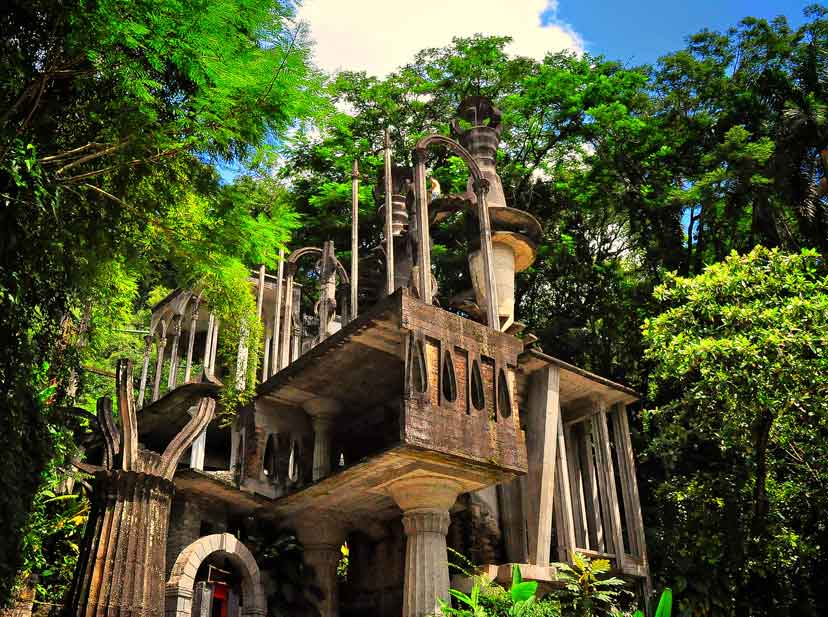
'Staircase to Heaven' the main building 4 stories above the ground, 2011

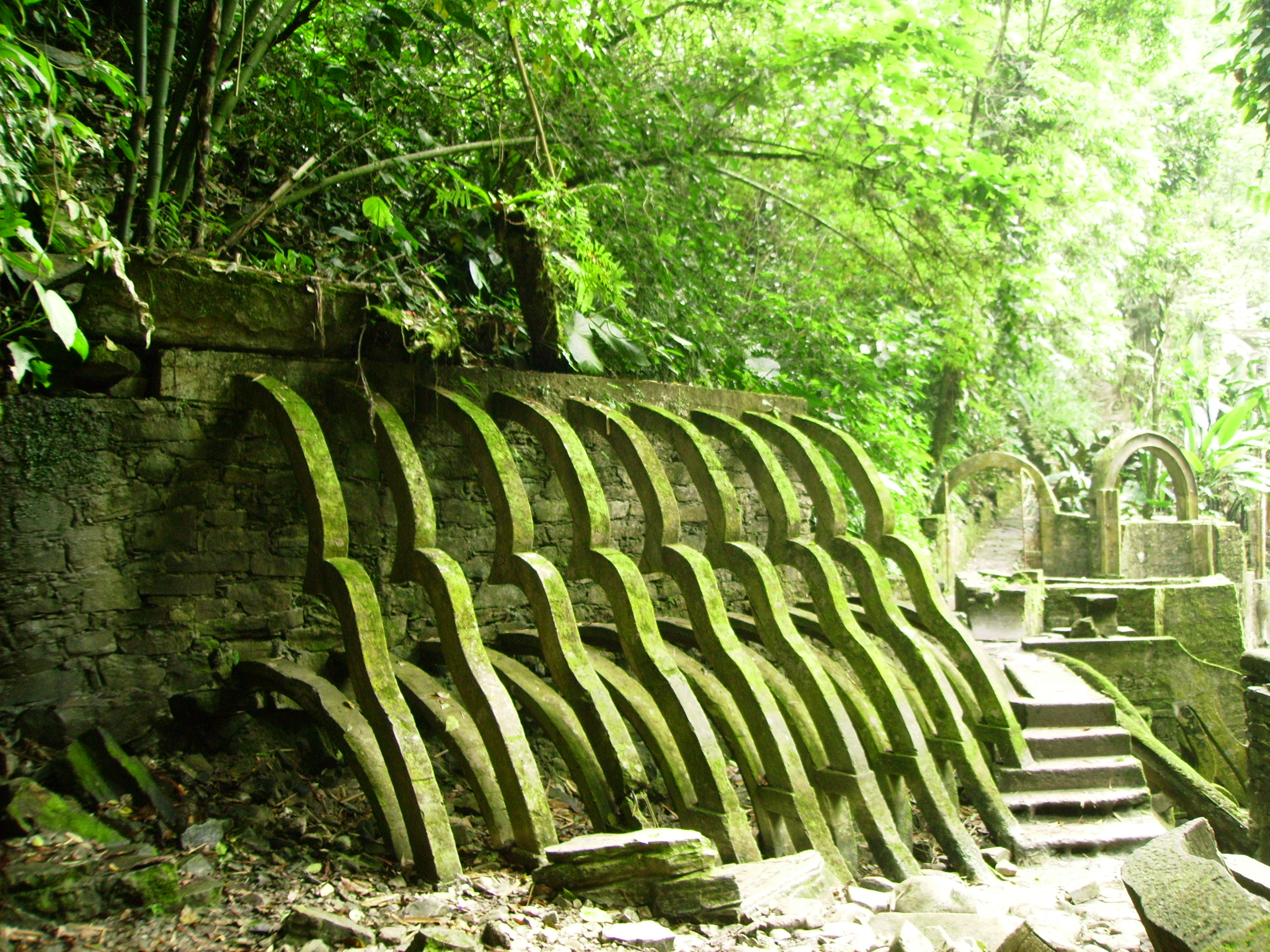
The surrealist sculpture park Las Pozas, Xilitla

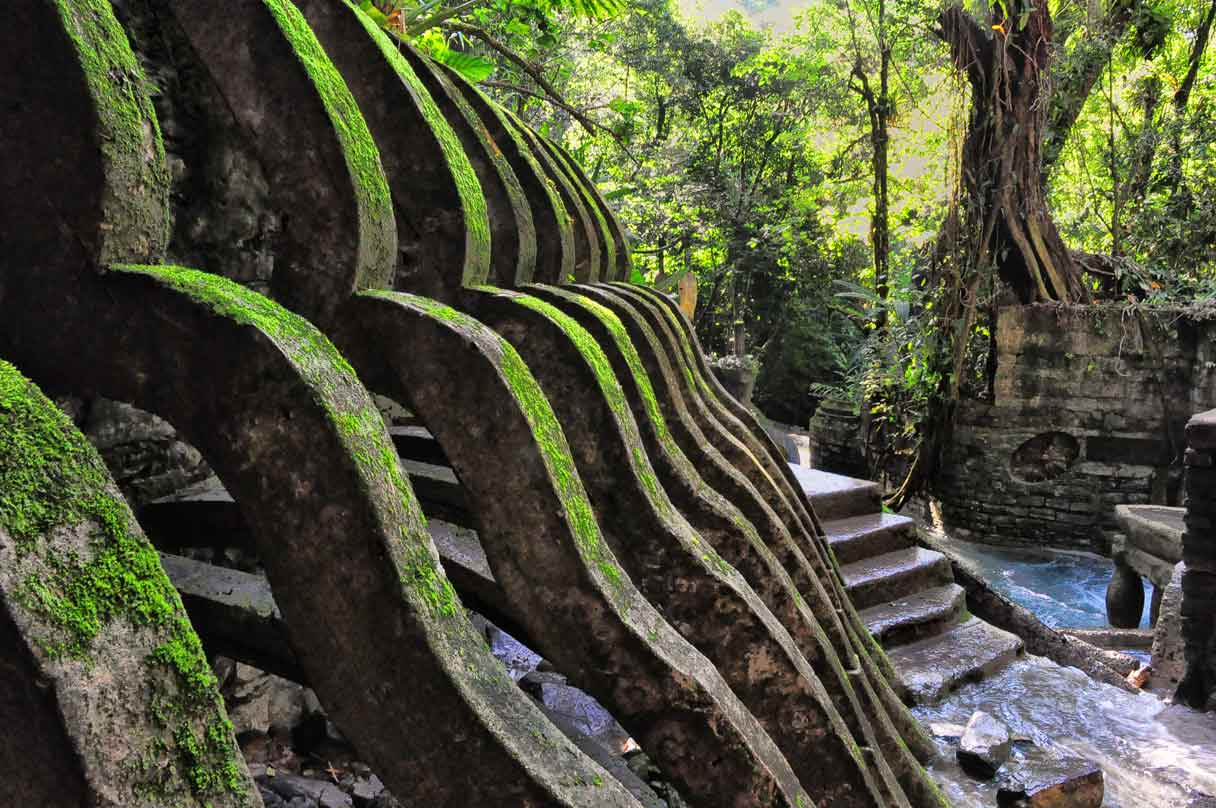
The Pools are surrounded by forms with paths to further down the valley. 2011

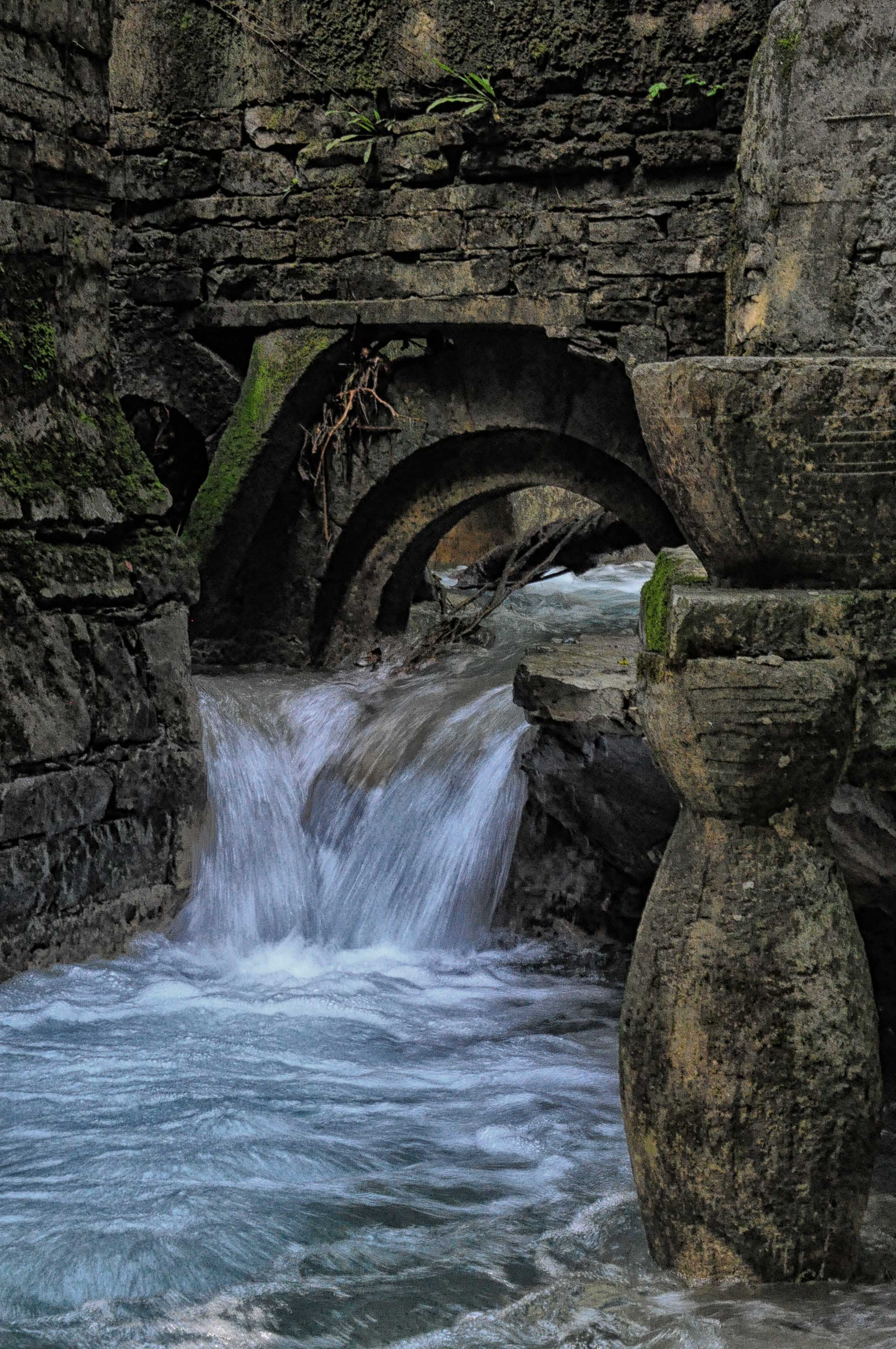
Stream running through gardens, Las Pozas, Xilitla, 2012

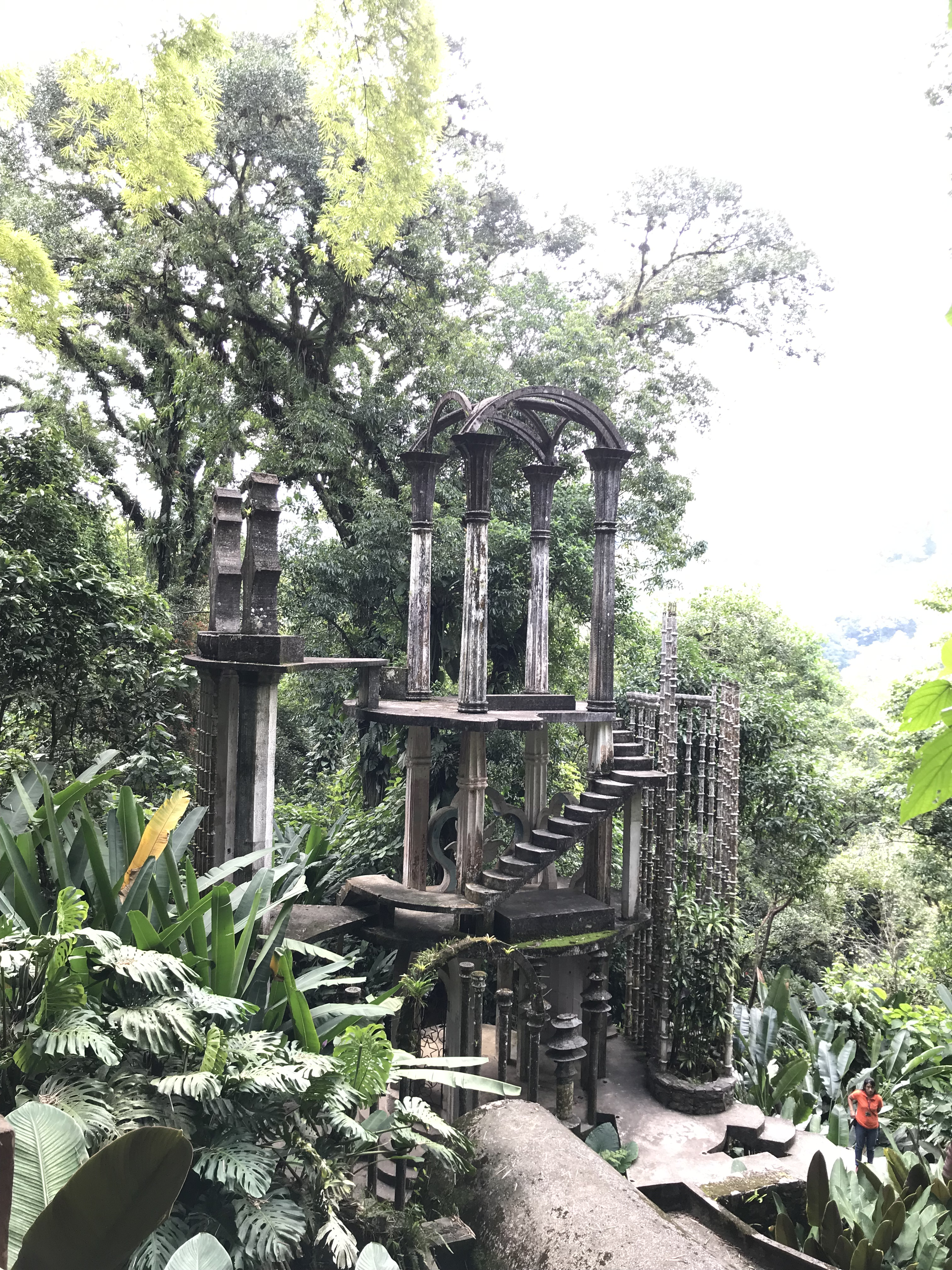
Castillo Surrealista de Edward James, 2019
