= Mexico–Nigeria relations =

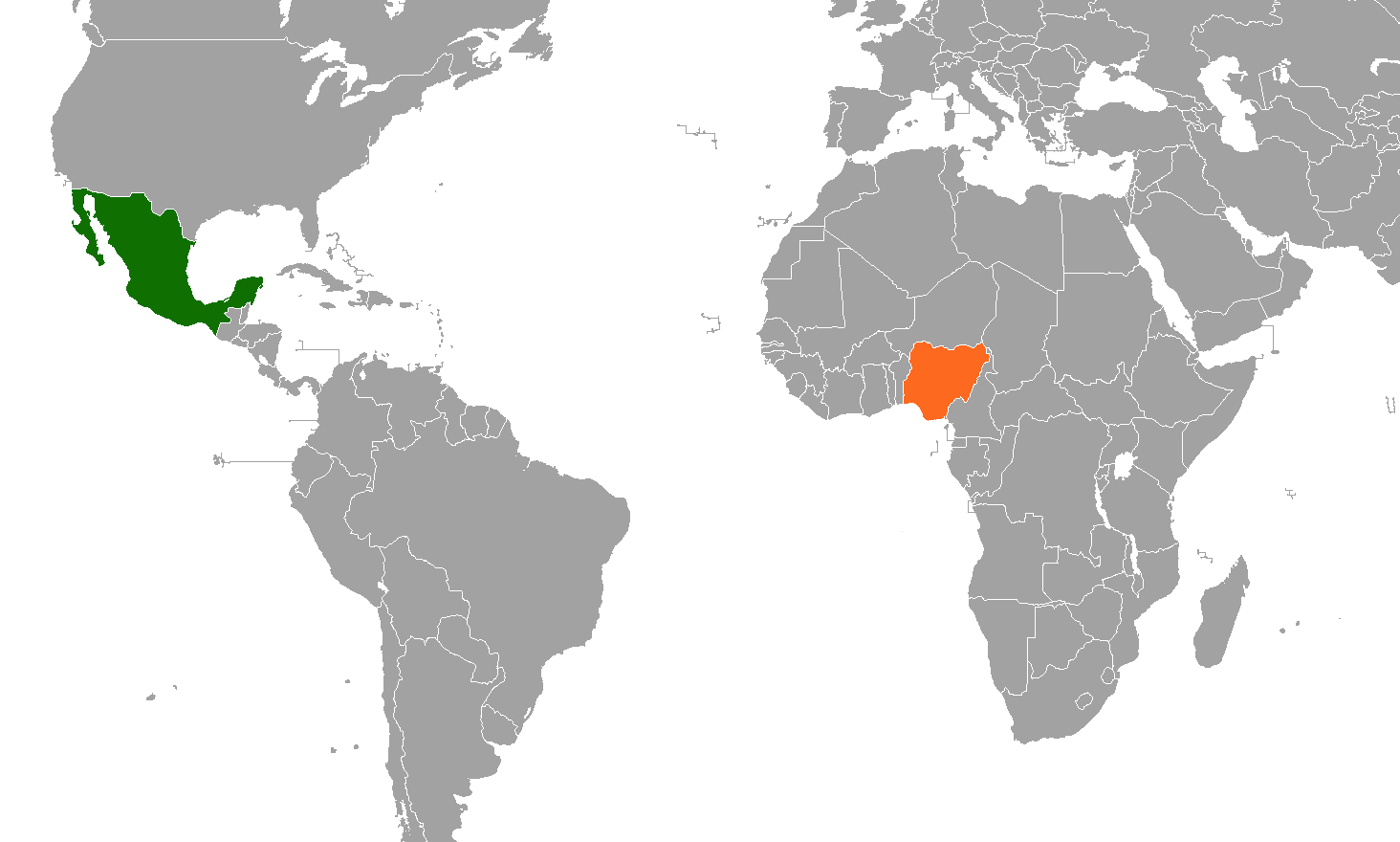

- Mexico: Nigeria

The nations of Mexico and Nigeria established diplomatic relations in 1976 and are two regional power nations in Latin America and Africa, respectively. Both nations are members of the Group of 15, Group of 24 and the United Nations.

== History ==
Both nations established diplomatic relations with each other on 14 April 1976. Three months after establishing diplomatic relations, Mexico opened an embassy in Lagos, however, the embassy was closed in 1979 due to financial restraints. In 1981, Nigeria opened an embassy in Mexico City and later closed its diplomatic mission two years later in 1983. Nigeria re-opened its embassy in Mexico in 2000 and Mexico followed suit by opening an embassy in Abuja (the new capital of Nigeria since 1991) in 2008.

In 1981, Nigerian President Shehu Shagari attended a summit for Heads of States in Cancún where he met with his counterpart, Mexican President José López Portillo and leaders of other nations. Since 2000, bilateral relations and high level meetings between both nations have steadily increased. In March 2002, Nigerian President Olusegun Obasanjo paid his first visit to Mexico to attend the Monterrey Consensus held in the northern Mexican city of Monterrey. In September 2002, President Vicente Fox became the first Mexican head-of-state to pay an official visit to Nigeria. In September 2005, Nigerian President Olusegun Obasanjo paid a second visit to Mexico.

In March 2013, Mexican Foreign Undersecretary Lourdes Aranda Bezaury paid a visit to Nigeria and met with President Goodluck Jonathan. In 2014, Jim O'Neill, known for coining the term BRIC in 2001, coined the term MINT (Mexico, Indonesia, Nigeria, and Turkey) an acronym that refers to a group of countries with the potential to realize rapid economic growth. That same year, the Mexican embassy in Nigeria launched the Nigerian-Mexican Chamber of Commerce and Industry (NMCCI) to promote business between the two countries.

In February 2020, Mexican customs confiscated a Yoruba ancient bronze sculpture and returned it to Nigeria. The sculpture was later declared to be a fake according to the curator of the Royal Museum for Central Africa in Tervuren, Belgium.

In 2024, both nations celebrated 48 years of diplomatic relations.

== High-level visits ==
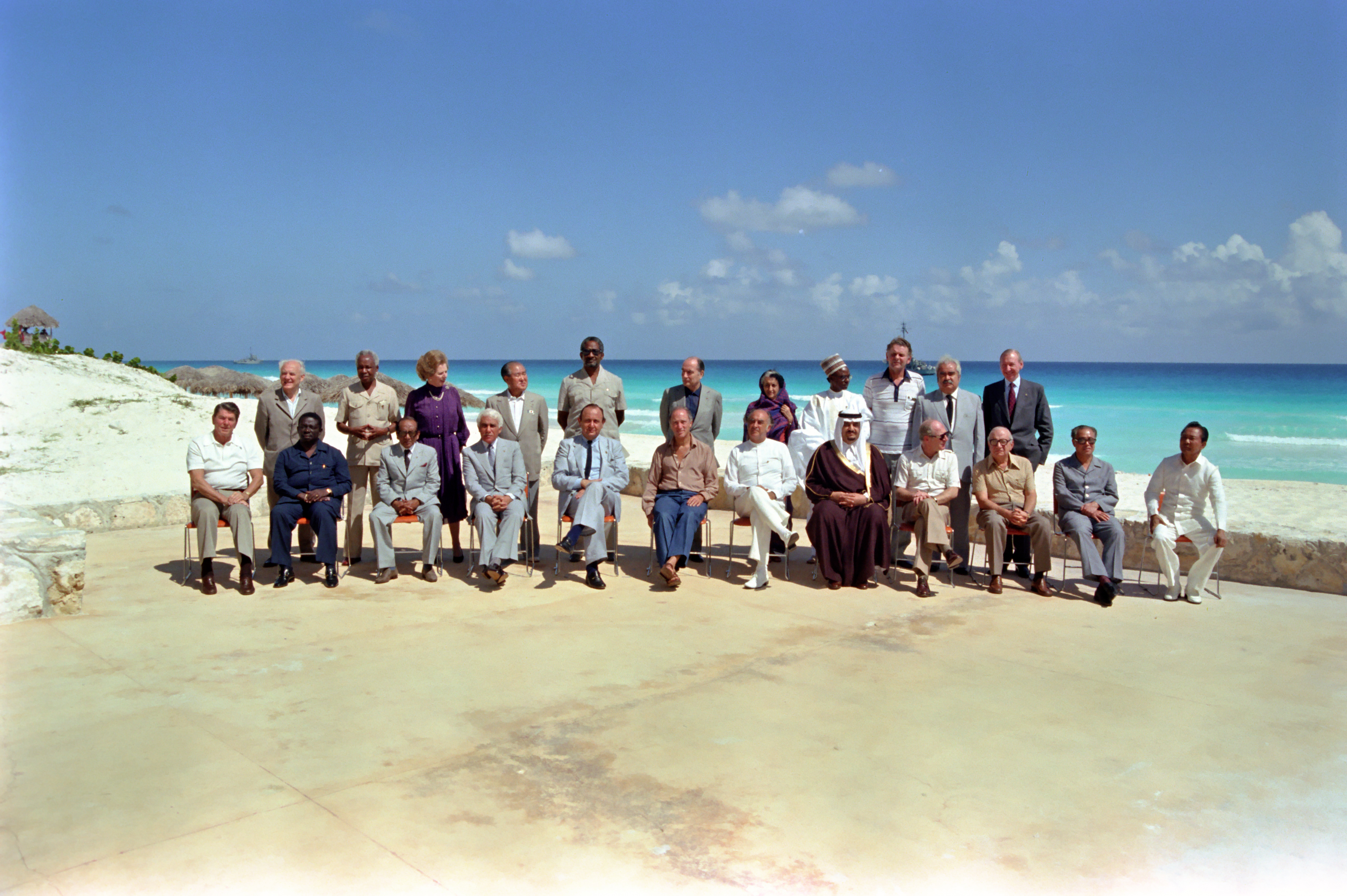
Nigerian President Shehu Shagari attending the North–South Summit in Cancún along with his Mexican counterpart, President José López Portillo; 1981

High-level visits from Mexico to Nigeria

- President Vicente Fox (2002)
- Special Envoy Roberto Zapata Barradas (2013)
- Foreign Undersecretary Lourdes Aranda Bezaury (2013)
- Director General of ProMéxico Francisco González Díaz (2016, 2018)
- Director General for Africa and the Middle East Jorge Álvarez Fuentes (2018)

High-level visits from Nigeria to Mexico

- President Shehu Shagari (1981)
- President Olusegun Obasanjo (2002, 2005)
- Deputy Finance Minister Yerima Lawan Ngama (2013)
- Finance Minister Ngozi Okonjo-Iweala (2014)

== Bilateral agreements ==
Both nations have signed several bilateral agreements such as an Agreement for Educative and Cultural Cooperation (1999); Agreement to Establish Consultations on Mutual Interests (2012); Memorandum of Understanding between ProMéxico and the Council for the Promotion of Exports of Nigeria (2015); Memorandum of Understanding between Bancomext and the Nigerian Bank for Exports and Imports (2015); and a Memorandum of Understanding between the National Universities Commission of Nigeria and the National Association of Universities and Institutions of Higher Education of Mexico (2016).

== Trade relations ==
In 2023, trade between the two nations totaled US$121.6 million. Mexico's main exports to Nigeria include: motor cars and other vehicles, alcohol, wheat and meslin, fish, medicine, telephones and mobile phones, and tubes and pipes. Nigeria's main exports to Mexico include: plants, seeds, fruits, mineral or chemical nitrogenados; cocoa paste, and electrical wires and cables. Mexican multinational companies such as Cemex and Grupo Bimbo operate in Nigeria. In January 2020, the Nigerian mobile payment startup Paga announced the launch of its operations in Mexico and Latin America.

== Resident diplomatic missions ==
- Mexico has an embassy in Abuja.
- Nigeria has an embassy in Mexico City.
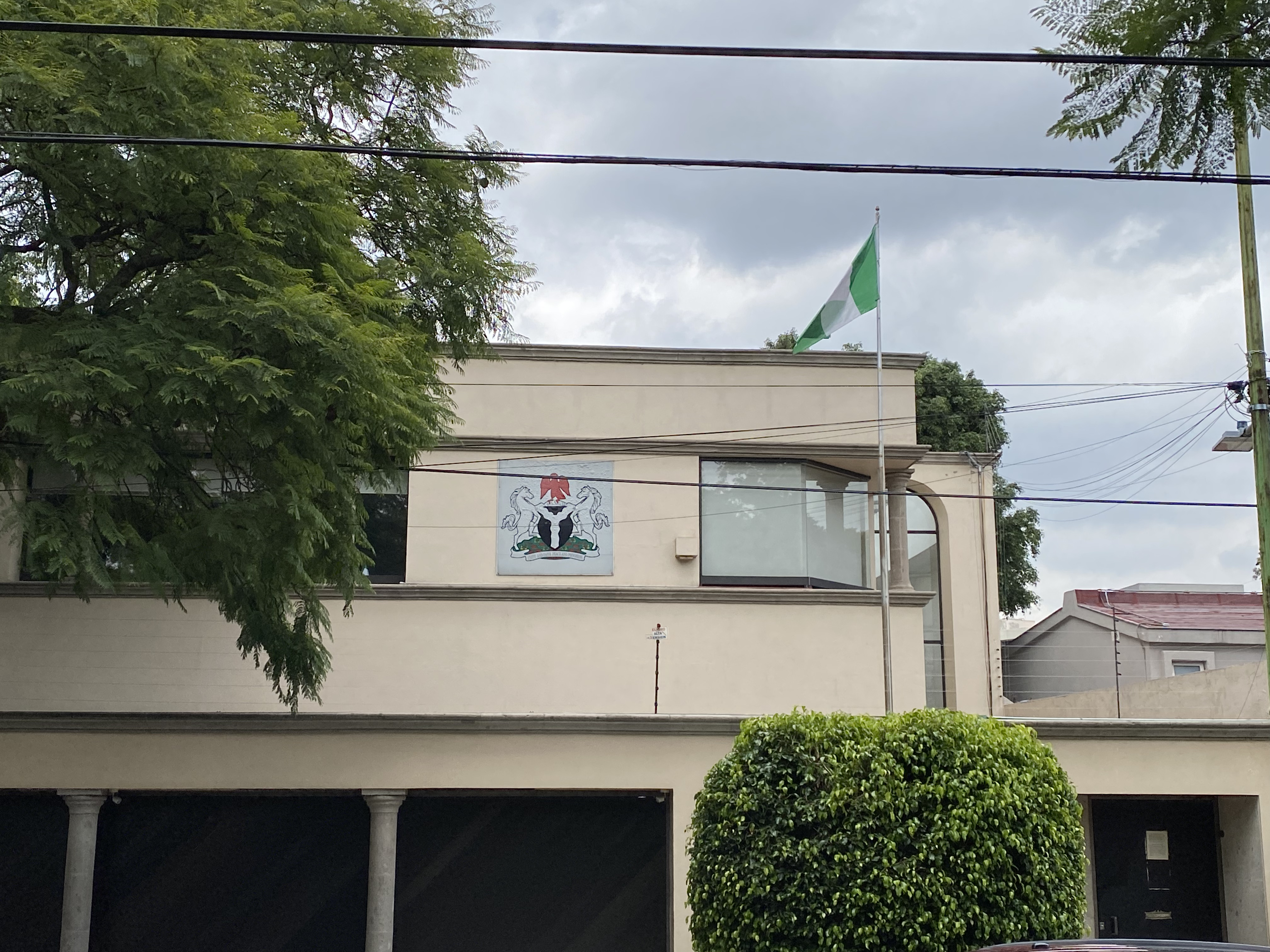
Embassy of Nigeria in Mexico City

== See also ==
- Richard Okunorobo
