= Matlapa =

Coordinates: 21°20′N 98°50′W

- Municipality and town
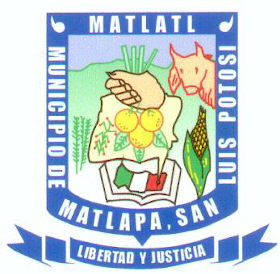
- Coat of arms

- Location in Mexico
- Country: Mexico
- State: San Luis Potosí
- Time zone: UTC-6 (Zona Centro)

Matlapa is a town and municipality in the central Mexican state of San Luis Potosí.

== Geography ==
=== Climate ===
Climate data for Matlapa (1951–2010, extremes 1982–2015)
Month	Jan	Feb	Mar	Apr	May	Jun	Jul	Aug	Sep	Oct	Nov	Dec	Year
Record high °C (°F)	40.1 (104.2)	38.3 (100.9)	44.5 (112.1)	48.8 (119.8)	45.2 (113.4)	47.1 (116.8)	40.8 (105.4)	39.8 (103.6)	38.5 (101.3)	39.0 (102.2)	37.0 (98.6)	34.6 (94.3)	48.8 (119.8)
Mean daily maximum °C (°F)	24.3 (75.7)	26.4 (79.5)	29.5 (85.1)	32.8 (91.0)	34.6 (94.3)	34.8 (94.6)	33.4 (92.1)	34.0 (93.2)	32.3 (90.1)	30.1 (86.2)	27.3 (81.1)	24.4 (75.9)	30.3 (86.5)
Daily mean °C (°F)	18.2 (64.8)	19.9 (67.8)	22.7 (72.9)	25.8 (78.4)	28.3 (82.9)	28.7 (83.7)	27.6 (81.7)	27.9 (82.2)	26.8 (80.2)	24.6 (76.3)	21.6 (70.9)	18.7 (65.7)	24.2 (75.6)
Mean daily minimum °C (°F)	12.0 (53.6)	13.4 (56.1)	16.0 (60.8)	18.9 (66.0)	21.9 (71.4)	22.5 (72.5)	21.9 (71.4)	21.8 (71.2)	21.3 (70.3)	19.0 (66.2)	15.9 (60.6)	12.9 (55.2)	18.1 (64.6)
Record low °C (°F)	1.5 (34.7)	2.9 (37.2)	2.7 (36.9)	6.0 (42.8)	12.9 (55.2)	15.4 (59.7)	17.3 (63.1)	17.9 (64.2)	13.5 (56.3)	7.8 (46.0)	5.0 (41.0)	−2.3 (27.9)	−2.3 (27.9)
Average precipitation mm (inches)	27.2 (1.07)	35.0 (1.38)	37.9 (1.49)	65.3 (2.57)	89.2 (3.51)	132.0 (5.20)	185.6 (7.31)	176.0 (6.93)	274.4 (10.80)	171.9 (6.77)	60.2 (2.37)	26.5 (1.04)	1,281.2 (50.44)
Average precipitation days (≥ 0.1 mm)	9.3	9.1	8.7	9.7	10.5	12.0	15.6	13.3	15.0	11.7	9.1	9.7	133.7
Average relative humidity (%)	84.0	82.1	77.8	75.4	76.6	78.4	81.0	79.9	83.5	84.3	84.0	84.9	81.0
Mean monthly sunshine hours	145.5	149.3	171.1	188.6	209.6	209.9	207.2	224.1	175.5	175.2	161.6	141.8	2,159.3
Source 1: Servicio Meteorológico National
Source 2: World Meteorological Organization (relative humidity and sun 1981–2010)
