= Axtla de Terrazas =

- Municipality and town
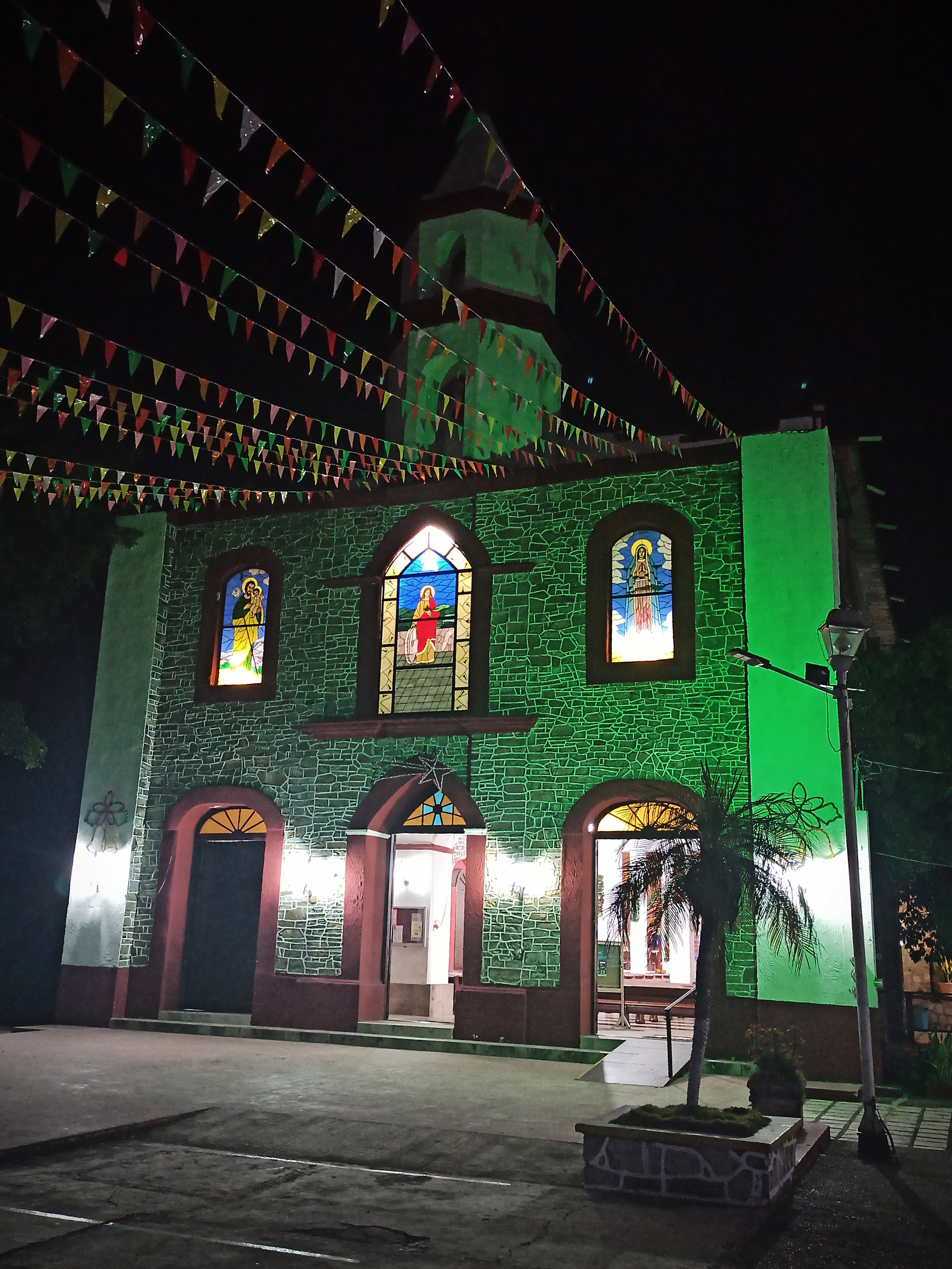
- Parroquia de Santa Catarina at night time
- Motto: El corazón de la Huasteca
- Location in Mexico Axtla de Terrazas (Mexico)
- Coordinates: 21°26′22″N 98°52′20″W
- Country: Mexico
- State: San Luis Potosí

Government
  - Municipal President: Gregorio Cruz Martínez

Population (2020)
  - Total: 32,721
  - Seat: 8,045
- Time zone: UTC-6 (Zona Centro)
- Website: http://www.axtladeterrazas-slp.gob.mx/2021-2024/

Axtla de Terrazas is one of the 58 municipalities in the central Mexican state of San Luis Potosí. The municipality was founded 1826, its name comes from Nahuatl (astlan) and is interpreted as: "Place of white herons", it was added de Terrazas in honor of the revolutionary Alfredo M. Terrazas.

== Politics ==
Gregorio Cruz Martinez is the Constitutional Municipality President as of 2021 with his term lasting until 2024.

== Demographics ==
According to the II Population and Housing Count of 2005, the municipality has 32,721 inhabitants, of which 16,298 are men and 16,423 are women. 75% of the population is indigenous or at least of indigenous descent,65% of the population is catholic.

== Castle of Health ==
The Castle Of Health (Spanish: Castillo De La Salud) is a medicinal castle built in 1974 by Beto Ramon, a Huasteca Indian man who learned traditional/herbal medicine, the castle has symbolic meaning, with parts of the castle referencing passages from the bible. The castle is still in use by people who use traditional and herbal medicine.
