= San Martín Chalchicuautla =

Coordinates: 21°23′N 98°39′W

- Municipality and town
- Interactive map of San Martín Chalchicuautla
- Country: Mexico
- State: San Luis Potosí
- Time zone: UTC-6 (Zona Centro)

San Martín Chalchicuautla is a town and municipality in the central Mexican state of San Luis Potosí.
