= Xilitla =

Municipality and town in San Luis Potosí, Huasteca, Mexico

- Municipality
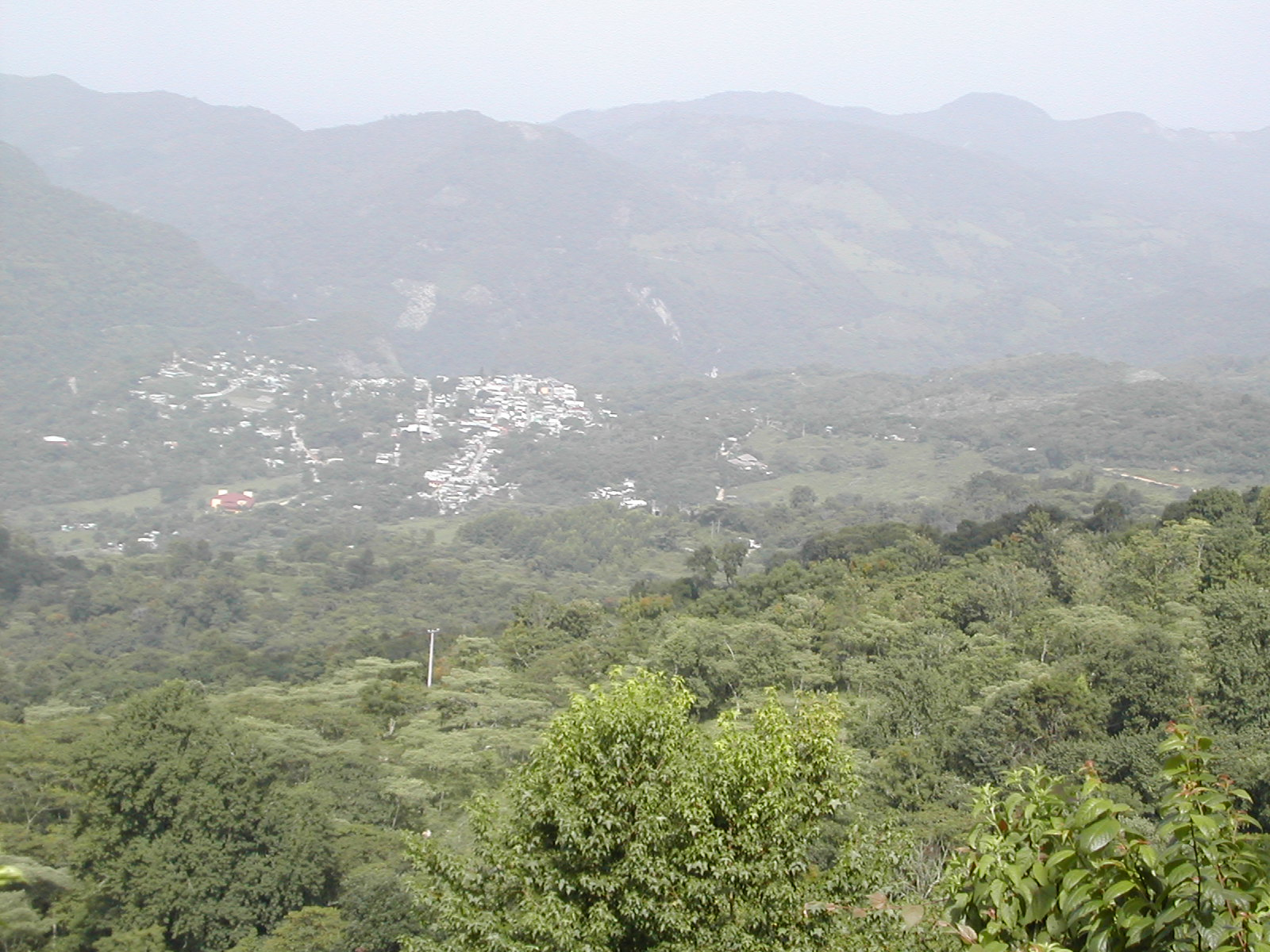
- Town of Xilitla, seen from its western hills.

- Location in Mexico Xilitla (Mexico)
- Country: Mexico
- State: San Luis Potosí

Population (2020)
  - Municipality: 49,742
  - Town: 6,644
- Demonym: (in Spanish)
- Time zone: UTC−6 (CST)

Xilitla is a municipality (Spanish: municipio) and town in the state of San Luis Potosí in the Huasteca region of Mexico. The town is located at 21°23′08″N 98°59′25″W The municipality has an area of 415 square kilometres (160 sq mi) and had a population of 51,498 in 2010 of whom 6,576 lived in town of Xilitla.

Xilitla is known for its fertile mountains and springs which create panoramic landscapes throughout the municipality. Las Pozas gardens are a major tourist attraction.

== History and economy ==
The rugged landscape has partly shielded Xilitla from industrialization, helping preserve its indigenous Huastec and Nahuatl cultures and traditional agrarian lifestyles. Most of Xilitla's residents live in over 100 rural villages of several dozen up to several hundred people. About 30,000 people in Xilitla live in indigenous households and about 20,000 of them speak an indigenous language, principally Huastec. Most of the speakers of an indigenous language also speak Spanish.

Augustine missionary activity in the Xilitla area began in 1537 and in 1553 construction began on the St. Augustine Convent. It was built to serve both a religious building and a fortress as the Chichimeca War was in progress and one of the hostile Chichimeca tribes, the Pame, lived to the northwest. The convent was attacked and burned by the Native peoples in 1569 and 1587 and largely abandoned by the Augustines. In the 17th century, the Dominicans made another attempt to evangelize but were unable to overcome the hostility of the Natives. Finally, in the mid-18th century, Fray Junípero Serra and the Franciscans succeeded in establishing a permanent missionary presence in the region.

The economy is primarily agricultural with the main crops being coffee and citrus. A coffee fair is held in August. A local food specialty is the zacahuil, a giant tamale (3 to 4 feet long) wrapped in banana leaves and filled with pork on one side and chicken on the other.

== Geography ==
The town of Xilitla has an elevation of 676 metres (2,218 ft) and is located in the eastern slopes of the Sierra Gorda mountain range, part of the Sierra Madre Oriental. Narrow valleys in the municipality dip to 400 metres (1,300 ft). La Silleta, a prominent thumb-shaped mountain, scalable only with mountain climbing gear, rises to 8,350 feet (2,550 m) six miles west of the city. The land area in the municipality is largely steep but habitable slopes. To the south and west, Xilitla borders the mountains of Querétaro and Hidalgo states. To the northeast, Xilitla borders flat terrain along the Tancuilin river, and Mexican highway 85.

There are a number of caves and caverns in Xilitla, as well as many natural springs. Parakeet Cave, a short walk from the town, is home to a large number of green parrots which leave and re-enter the cave at dawn and dusk every day. The land is largely sedimentary rock with striations visible on cliffs and roads.

=== Climate ===
The climatic classification for Xilitla is a humid subtropical climate closely bordering a tropical monsoon climate (Köppen climate classification). Xilitla's altitude moderates the hot temperatures recorded in nearby areas at lower altitudes. Receiving more than 100 inches (2,500 mm) of precipitation annually, Xilitla is one of the wettest areas of Mexico. Rainfall occurs throughout the year, with maximum precipitation coming in summer, but winters are not as dry as in many other parts of Mexico.

Climate data for Xilitla 676 metres (2,218 ft) above sea level
| Month | Jan | Feb | Mar | Apr | May | Jun | Jul | Aug | Sep | Oct | Nov | Dec | Year |
|---|---|---|---|---|---|---|---|---|---|---|---|---|---|
| Mean daily maximum °C (°F) | 22.4 (72.3) | 24.3 (75.7) | 27.0 (80.6) | 29.8 (85.6) | 31.6 (88.9) | 31.6 (88.9) | 30.5 (86.9) | 31.4 (88.5) | 29.8 (85.6) | 28.1 (82.6) | 25.7 (78.3) | 23.2 (73.8) | 28.0 (82.4) |
| Daily mean °C (°F) | 17.6 (63.7) | 19.1 (66.4) | 21.5 (70.7) | 24.2 (75.6) | 26.2 (79.2) | 26.5 (79.7) | 25.7 (78.3) | 26.2 (79.2) | 25.1 (77.2) | 23.3 (73.9) | 20.8 (69.4) | 18.4 (65.1) | 22.9 (73.2) |
| Mean daily minimum °C (°F) | 12.7 (54.9) | 13.9 (57.0) | 16.0 (60.8) | 18.5 (65.3) | 20.7 (69.3) | 21.4 (70.5) | 20.9 (69.6) | 21.0 (69.8) | 20.3 (68.5) | 18.5 (65.3) | 15.9 (60.6) | 13.6 (56.5) | 17.8 (64.0) |
| Average precipitation mm (inches) | 61.9 (2.44) | 65.0 (2.56) | 70.2 (2.76) | 130.2 (5.13) | 185.0 (7.28) | 352.5 (13.88) | 418.1 (16.46) | 364.5 (14.35) | 516.8 (20.35) | 287.5 (11.32) | 96.1 (3.78) | 56.1 (2.21) | 2,603.9 (102.52) |
Source: Conagua (2020)

== Las Pozas ==
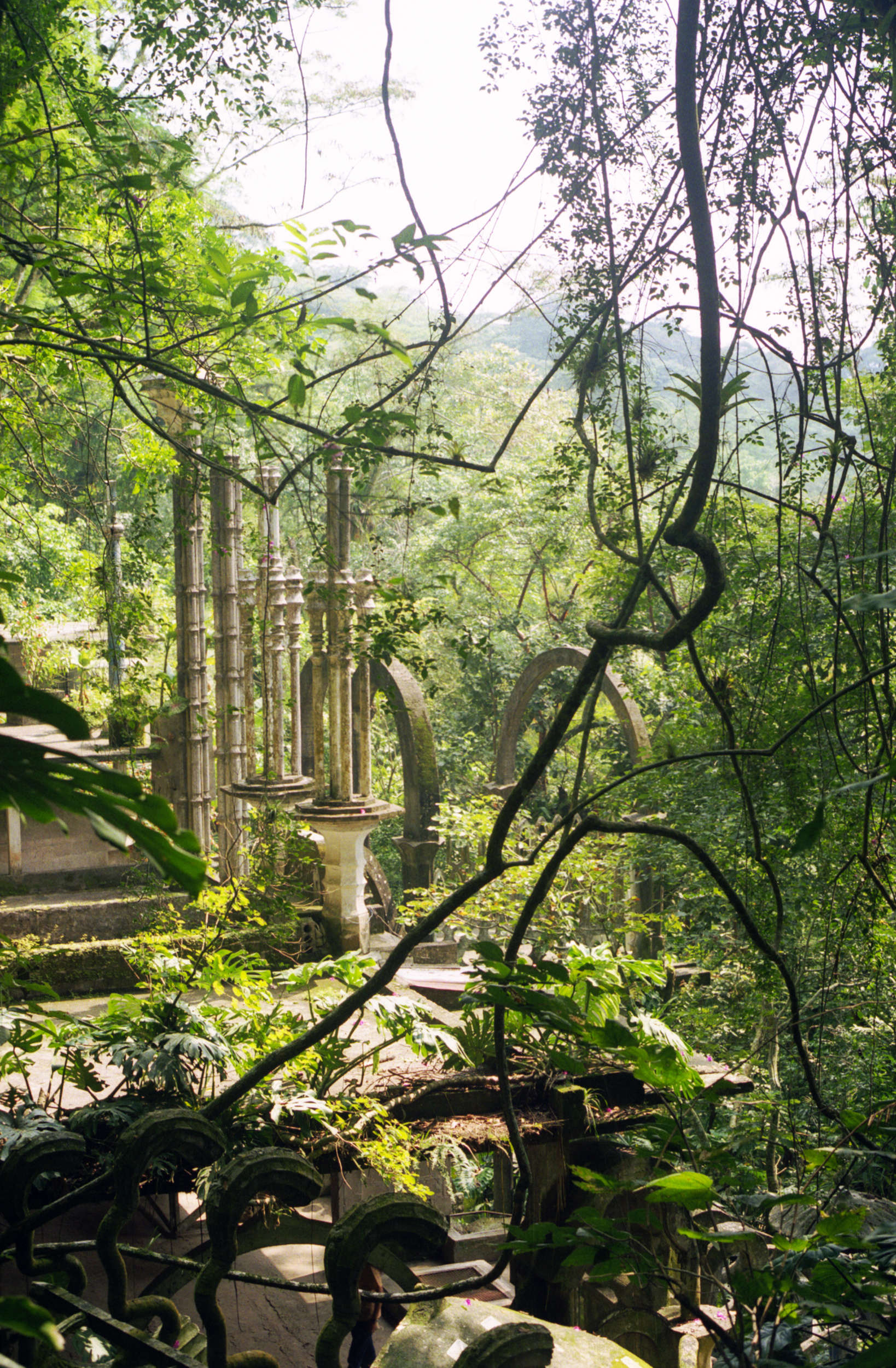
Las Pozas pillars

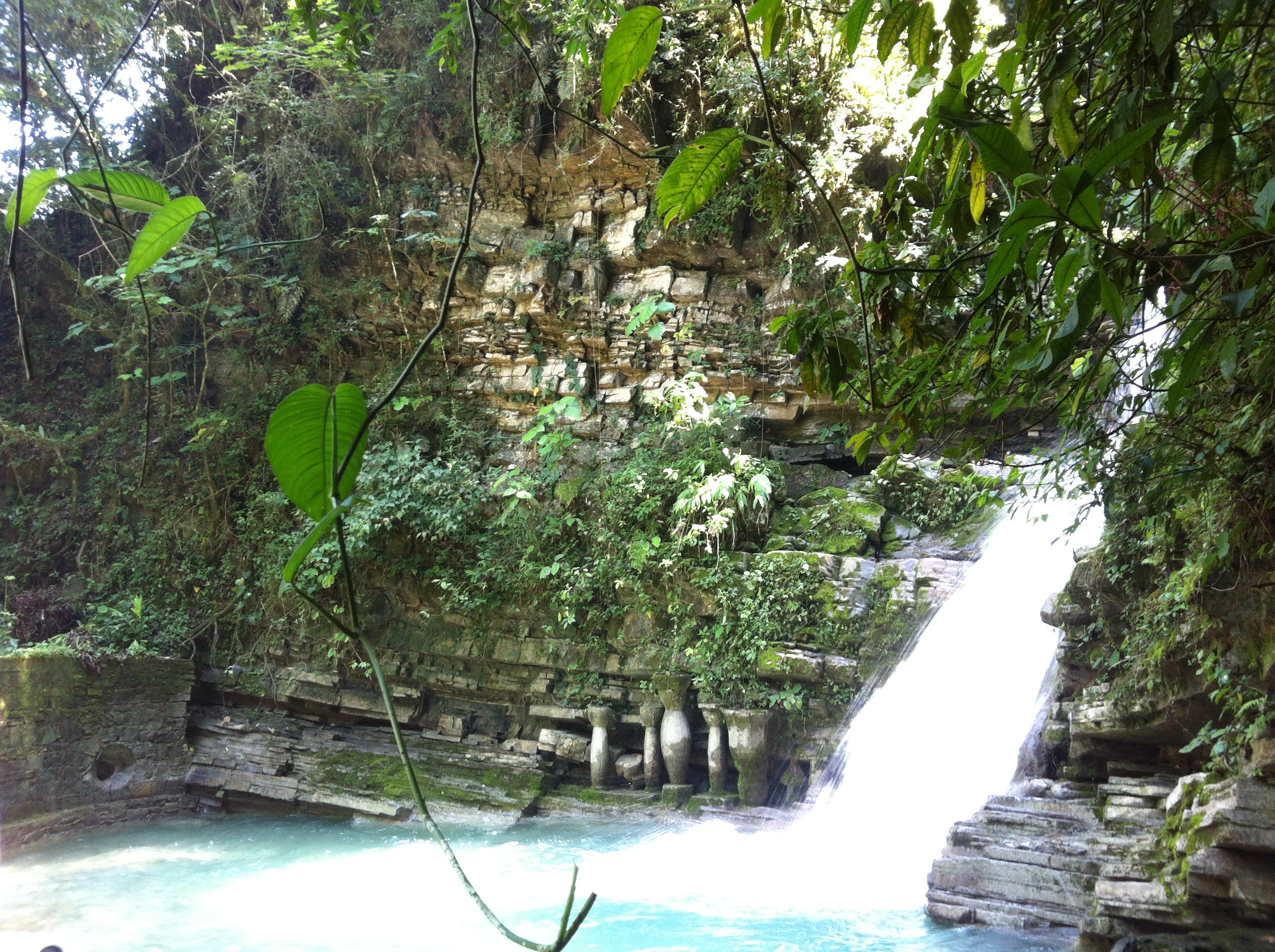
Some of Edward James' sculptures (in this case, vase-shaped stone objects) are interspersed within and around the river flowing through the garden.

The natural beauty of Xilitla inspired eccentric English artist Edward James to create Las Pozas ("the Pools"), a garden in a subtropical rainforest just outside the town of Xilitla. It includes more than 80 acres (32 ha) of natural waterfalls and pools interspersed with towering surrealist sculptures in concrete. James' objective was to create a "Garden of Eden" at Las Pozas. A foundation now owns and operates Las Pozas which is open to the public. Edward James house, near the centre of Xilitla is known as El Castillo and is now a hotel.

== Museo Leonora Carrington ==
A museum with sculptures of Leonora Carrington opened October 19, 2018.

== Transportation ==
The highway to the southwest winds around tight curves through the mountains to Querétaro and Mexico City. Heading northeast from town, the highway winds 10 km to La Y Griega, a large T-intersection into highway 85. Ciudad Valles is 100 km north along 85, and Tamazunchale is 50 km south. Buses run hourly from the town to Ciudad Valles and Tamazunchale and several times daily to Monterrey, Mexico City, San Luis Potosí and Tampico. More frequent buses are available at Y Griega.
