= Tamazunchale =

- Town & Municipality
- Tamazunchale
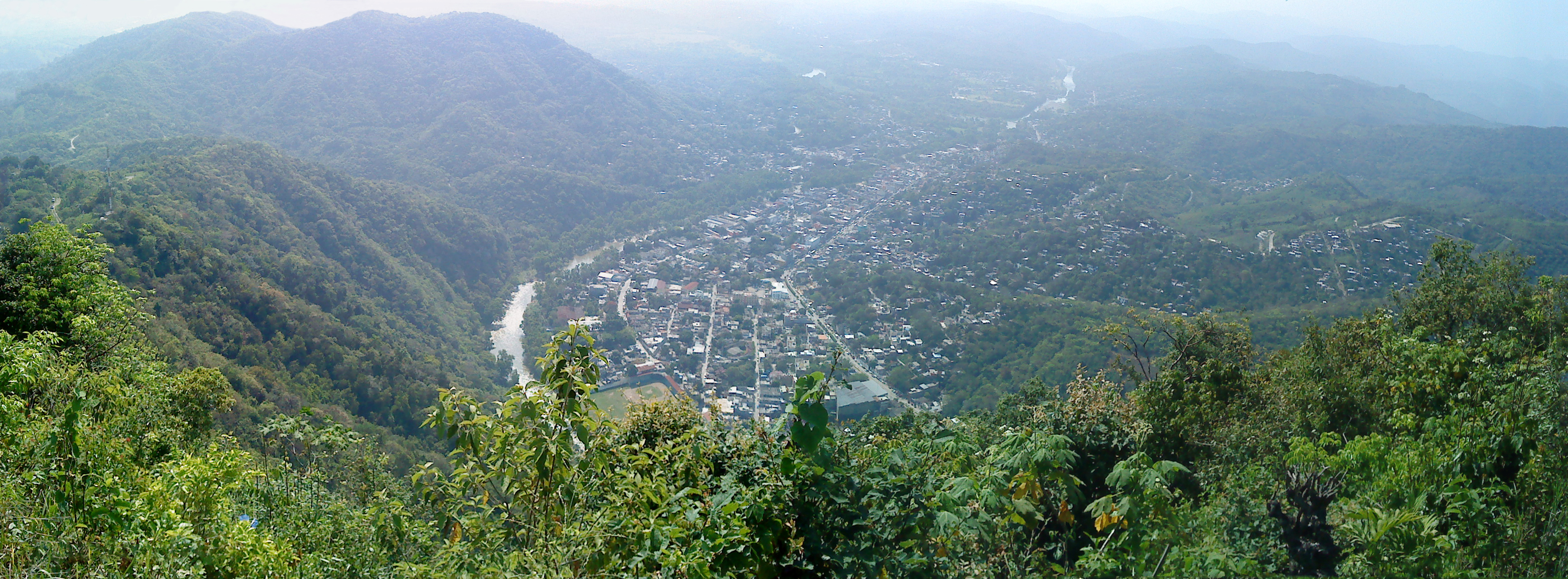

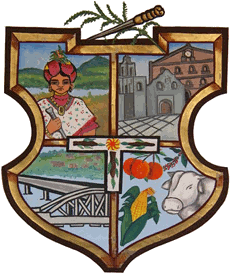
- Coat of arms

- Location within San Luis Potosí Location within Mexico
- Coordinates: 21°15′56″N 98°47′45″W
- Country: Mexico
- State: San Luis Potosí

Government
  - Mayor: Profr. Baldemar Orta López

Area
  - Metro: 354 km^{2} (137 sq mi)
- Elevation: 140 m (460 ft)

Population (2010)
  - Municipality: 96,820
- Time zone: UTC-6 (Zona Centro)
- Postal code: 79960
- Area code: 483
- Demonym: Tamazunchalenses
- Website: (in Spanish) Official site

Tamazunchale is a town and municipality in the Mexican state of San Luis Potosí. In 2010 the area of the municipality was 354 square kilometres (137 sq mi) and the population was 96,820. The population of the town was 24,562.

== Etymology ==
The name Tamazunchale (Tam-uxum-tzalle) comes from the Huastec language, and means "Place of the Government"; it was the Huastec capital around the 15th century.

== History ==
The area of the state of San Luis Potosí including Tamazunchale, Jacala, Coxcatlan, Tamacuil, Xatxapala, Tacetuco and Huahuatla along the Moctezuma River was the Huastec Indian territory. In 1454, Moctezuma I, the ruler of the city of Tenochtitlan, sent his troops to dominate the Huastec nation, and won the war. The Huastec had no choice but to give in and pay tribute to the Aztec capital. In 1485, the three chiefs of the Huastec nation, Chicontepec, Temapache, and Molango, led several rebellions and were free for a time from the Aztecs. In 1487, the new ruler of Tenochtitlan, Ahuizotl sent troops to end the rebellion and subjugate the Huastec nation. They did so, and to ensure they remained loyal, sent many Aztec families to live there, to the extent that 55% of the population of Tamazunchale were Aztecs. The Huastecs continued to pay tribute to the Aztec nation.

=== Cortes invasion ===
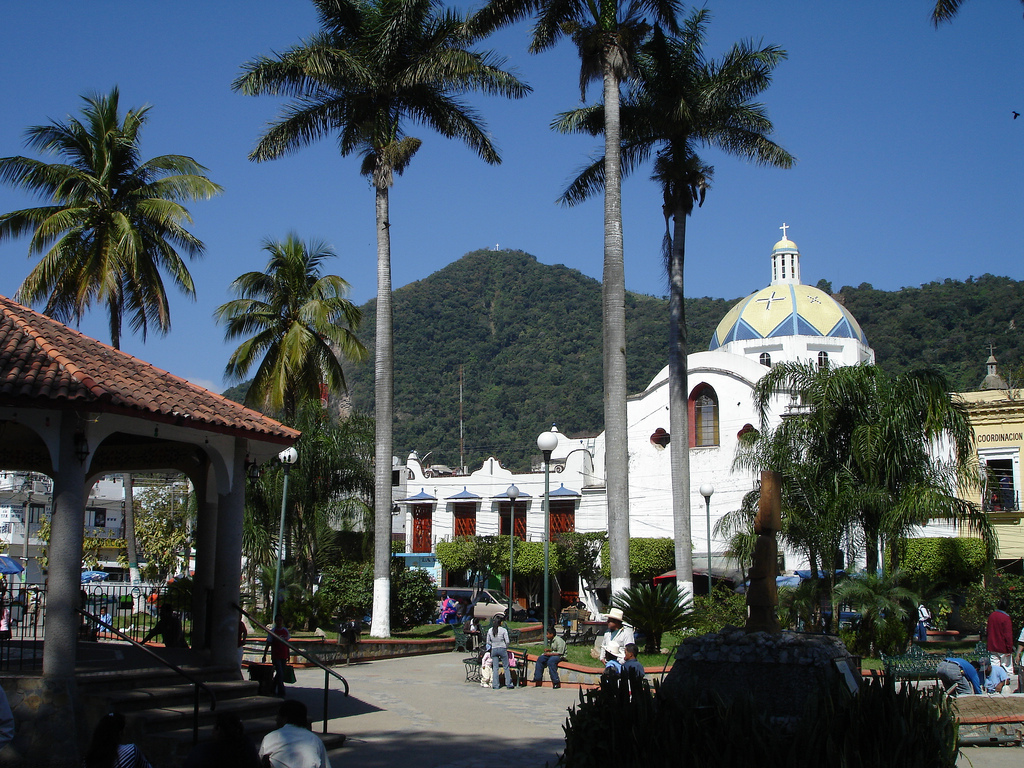
Cerro de la Cruz, Tamazunchale

In 1522 Hernán Cortés left from Coyoacán, where he lived after the Conquest of Tenochtitlan, and headed up the Moctezuma river to the Huastec nation and arrived with his troops and Indian allies headed by a nephew of Cuauhtémoc, the last ruler of the Aztecs. They attacked and conquered Tamazunchale. Then they went up river to Pánuco and helped Fransico de Garay, who had been on an earlier expedition to that area; 100 of his men had been killed by the Huastecs there, and 200 more elsewhere. With the help of Cortés's 100 Spanish soldiers and 15 thousand Acolhua warriors under the leadership of Yoyotzin and the younger brother of Ixtlixochitl, and 15 thousand Aztec warriors under the command of a nephew of Cuauhtemoc, they conquered Panuco and Xatxapala. They then burned to death 400 Huastec noblemen, despite the protest from the nobles of Tamanzunchale, Tacetuco, and Huahutla, The Huastec culture dispersed and left Tamanzunchale for other areas. Much later the Agustin Religious order came in 1539 under the leadership of Fr. Antonio de la Roa and Fr. Juan de Sevilla. Shortly after came Father and Gran Minister of the Huasteca, Juan Eustacio. The Agustin Order established the first Church in Xilitla.

== Independence from Spain ==
During the insurrections of Miguel Hidalgo y Costilla, the leader for the Huastecan region was Francisco Pena.

== Modern times ==
For tourists driving from the United States, Tamazunchale has long been a prominent overnight stop en route to Mexico City. Some English-speaking tourists call the town Thomas-and-Charley.
