= Congress of San Luis Potosí =

Legislature of San Luis Potosí, Mexico

Congress of the State of San Luis Potosí
- LXIV Legislature
- Coat of arms of San Luis Potosí

Type
- Type: Unicameral

History
- Founded: 14 April 1861

Structure
- Seats: 27 deputies
- Political groups: Government (24): PVEM (9); MORENA (6); PT (4); New Alliance (1)
- Political groups: Opposition (7): PAN (4); PRI (2); MC (1)

Elections
- Voting system: 15 with first-past-the-post and 12 with proportional representation
- Last election: 2 June 2024
- Next election: 6 June 2027

Meeting place
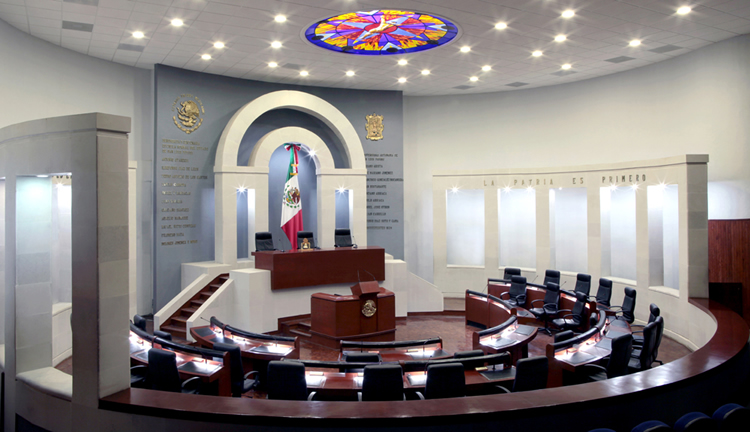
- Edificio Presidente Juárez, San Luis Potosí

Website
- https://congresosanluis.gob.mx/

The Congress of the State of San Luis Potosí is the legislative branch of the state government of San Luis Potosí, Mexico. It is composed of 27 deputies, of whom 15 are elected by relative majority in single-member districts and 12 by proportional representation. The congress meets in the President Juarez Building, located in the Historic Center of San Luis Potosí

== History ==
With the promulgation of the Federal Constitution of 1857, the states of the Mexican Republic were required to establish their own legislatures. In San Luis Potosí, Governor Eulalio Degollado convened a constituent congress, which was installed on 5 July 1857. This first constituent congress was dissolved following the proclamation of the Plan of Tacubaya in December of that year, which rejected the new federal constitution and abolished state congresses, triggering the Reform War.

In 1860, Liberal governor Sóstenes Escandón convened another constituent congress, which was suspended due to the declaration of a state of siege amid the ongoing conflict. The constituent legislature was finally established on 14 April 1861. It completed the drafting of the Constitution of San Luis Potosí on 13 July, which was promulgated on 27 July 1861. Both the constitution and the congress were abolished during the Second Mexican Empire (1863–1867). Following the fall of the empire, the state constitution and congress were reinstated.

After the promulgation of the Mexican Constitution of 1917, the XXV Legislature acted as a constituent body to reform the state constitution in line with the new federal charter. Between 1938 and 1943, the federal government twice decreed the disappearance of powers in the state, causing the congress to suspend its functions on both occasions.

== Legislatures ==
Legislatures of the Congress of the State of San Luis Potosí
Legislature	Term
Constituent	1861
I	1861–1862
II	1867–1869
III	1869–1871
IV	1871–1873
V	1873–1875
VI	1875–1877
VII	1877–1879
VIII	1879–1881
IX	1881–1883
X	1883–1885
XI	1885–1887
XII	1887–1889
XIII	1889–1891
XIV	1891–1893
XV	1893–1895
XVI	1895–1897
XVII	1897–1899
XVIII	1899–1901
XIX	1901–1903
XX	1903–1905
XXI	1905–1907
XXII	1907–1909
XXIII	1909–1911
XXIV	1911–1913
XXV	1917–1919
XXVI	1919–1921
XXVII	1921–1923
XXVIII	1923–1925
XXIX	1925–1927
XXX	1927–1929
XXXI	1929–1931
XXXII	1931–1933
XXXIII	1933–1935
XXXIV	1935–1937
XXXV	1937–1938
XXXVI	1939–1941
XXXVII	1943–1945
XXXVIII	1945–1948
XXXIX	1948–1951
XL	1951–1954
XLI	1954–1957
XLII	1957–1960
XLIII	1960–1963
XLIV	1963–1966
XLV	1966–1969
XLVI	1969–1972
XLVII	1972–1975
XLVIII	1975–1978
XLIX	1978–1981
L	1981–1984
LI	1984–1987
LII	1987–1990
LIII	1990–1993
LIV	1993–1997
LV	1997–2000
LVI	2000–2003
LVII	2003–2006
LVIII	2006–2009
LIX	2009–2012
LX	2012–2015
LXI	2015–2018
LXII	2018–2021
LXIII	2021–2024
LXIV	2024–2027

== See also ==
- List of Mexican state congresses
- Governor of San Luis Potosí
- Congress of the Union
