= LXV Legislature of the Mexican Congress =

Sitting of the Mexican Congress (2021 to 2024)

65th Congress LXV Legislatura
←	64th	66th	→
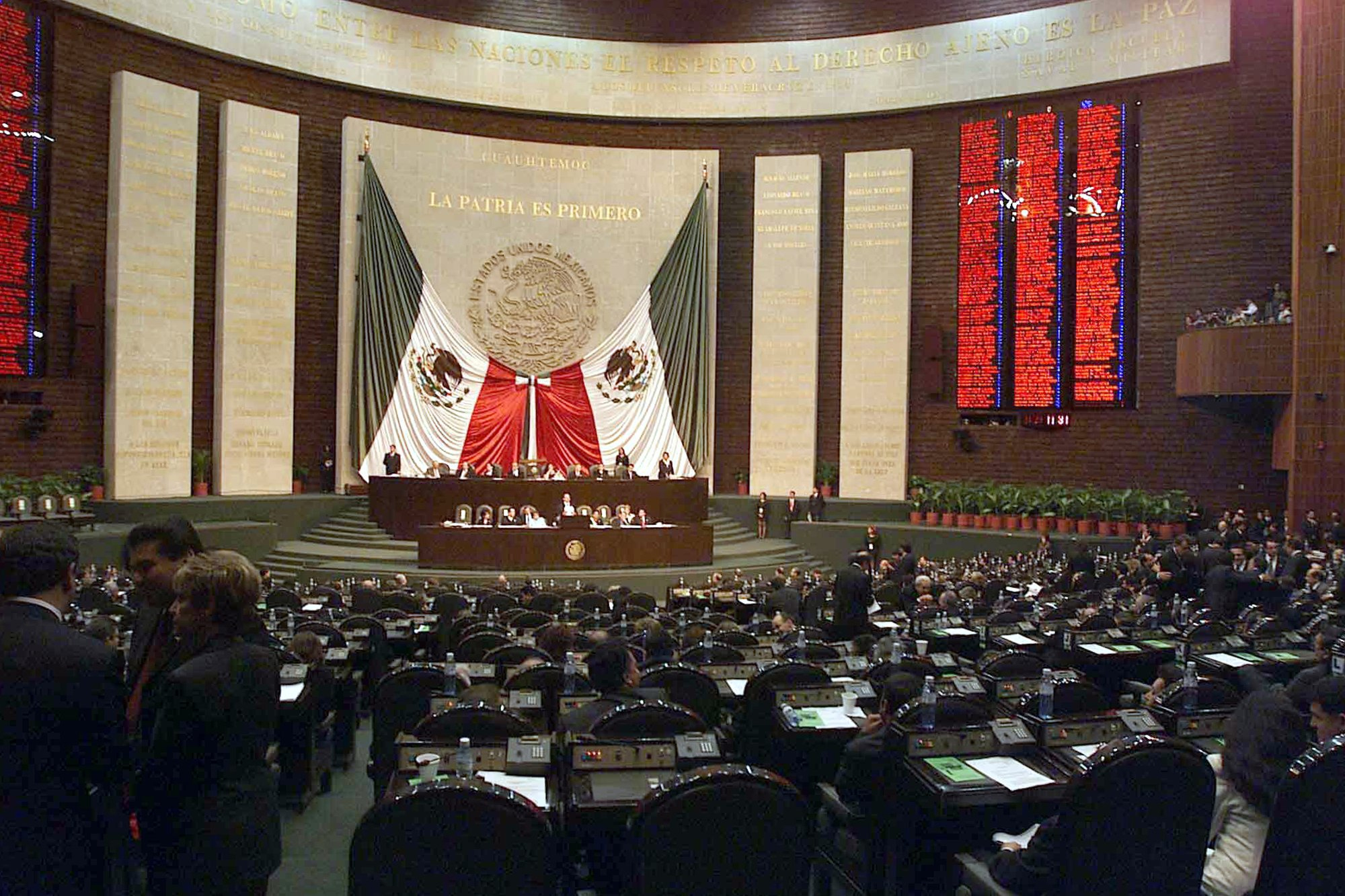
- Legislative Palace of San Lázaro

Overview
- Legislative body: Congress of the Union
- Meeting place: Legislative Palace of San Lázaro (Deputies/General Congress); Edificio del Senado (Senate)
- Term: 1 September 2021 – 31 August 2024
- Election: 6 June 2021

Senate of the Republic
- Members: 128
- President: Ana Lilia Rivera

Chamber of Deputies
- Members: 500
- President: Marcela Guerra Castillo

The LXV Legislature of the Congress of the Union (65th Congress) was a meeting of the legislative branch of Mexico, composed of the Chamber of Deputies and the Senate of the Republic. It convened on 1 September 2021, and ended on 31 August 2024, during the final three years of President Andrés Manuel López Obrador's presidency.

The Chamber of Deputies was elected in the 2021 legislative election, in which Juntos Hacemos Historia, consisting of the National Regeneration Movement (Morena), the Labor Party (PT), and the Ecologist Green Party of Mexico (PVEM), kept their majority but did not reach the two-thirds supermajority required to pass López Obrador's proposed constitutional reforms. This legislature was notable for being the first where deputies were eligible for reelection, with 129 out of the 500 seats being filled by returning deputies.

== Composition ==
These tables relate to the composition of the Senate of the Republic and the Chamber of Deputies at the start of the LXV Legislature and present day and summarises the changes in party affiliation that took place during the congress.

=== Senate ===
Party	Senators		
Party	Start of Legislature	End of Legislature	Change
National Regeneration Movement	61	57	▼4
National Action Party	25	19	▼6
Institutional Revolutionary Party	13	13	Steady
Citizens' Movement	8	11	▲3
Ecologist Green Party of Mexico	6	8	▲2
Labor Party	6	6	Steady
Independents	1	6	▲5
Social Encounter Party	4	4	Steady
Party of the Democratic Revolution	3	4	▲1
Vacant	1	0	▼1
Total	127	128	▲1

=== Chamber of Deputies ===
Party	Deputies		
Party	Start of Legislature	End of Legislature	Change
National Regeneration Movement	198	201	▲3
National Action Party	114	112	▼2
Institutional Revolutionary Party	71	68	▼3
Ecologist Green Party of Mexico	43	39	▼4
Labor Party	37	34	▼3
Citizens' Movement	23	29	▲6
Party of the Democratic Revolution	14	12	▼2
Independents	0	5	▲5
Total	500	500	Steady

== Leadership ==
=== Presiding officers ===
==== President of the Senate ====
Year	Term	Portrait	Name	Party
1	1 September 2021 – 31 August 2022		Olga Sánchez Cordero	National Regeneration Movement
2	1 September 2022 – 31 August 2023		Alejandro Armenta Mier	National Regeneration Movement
3	1 September 2023 – 31 August 2024		Ana Lilia Rivera	National Regeneration Movement

==== President of the Chamber of Deputies ====
Year	Term	Portrait	Name	Party
1	1 September 2021 – 31 August 2022		Sergio Gutiérrez Luna	National Regeneration Movement
2	1 September 2022 – 14 August 2023		Santiago Creel	National Action Party
3	1 September 2023 – 31 August 2024		Marcela Guerra Castillo	Institutional Revolutionary Party

=== Parliamentary coordinators ===
Party	Senate		Chamber of Deputies	
National Action Party	Julen Rementería del Puerto	2021–2024	Jorge Romero Herrera	2021–2024
Institutional Revolutionary Party	Miguel Ángel Osorio Chong	2021–2023	Rubén Moreira Valdez	2021–2024
Institutional Revolutionary Party	Manuel Añorve Baños	2023–2024	Rubén Moreira Valdez	2021–2024
Party of the Democratic Revolution	Miguel Ángel Mancera	2021–2024	Luis Ángel Espinoza Cházaro	2021–2024
Labor Party	Geovanna Bañuelos de la Torre	2021–2024	Alberto Anaya	2021–2024
Ecologist Green Party of Mexico	Raúl Bolaños Cacho Cué	2021–2024	Carlos Alberto Puente Salas	2021–2024
Citizens' Movement	Dante Delgado Rannauro	2021–2024	Jorge Máynez	2021–2024
Social Encounter Party	Sasil de León Villard	2021–2024	—N/a	—N/a
National Regeneration Movement	Ricardo Monreal	2021–2023	Ignacio Mier Velazco	2021–2024
National Regeneration Movement	Eduardo Ramírez Aguilar	2023–2024	Ignacio Mier Velazco	2021–2024
National Regeneration Movement	Ricardo Monreal	2024	Ignacio Mier Velazco	2021–2024

== Membership ==
=== Senate ===
==== Elected by state ====
In the list, the first two senators represent those who won a majority in the state, with the first referring to the first formula and the second to the second formula. The third corresponds to the senator who secured a seat through first minority.

==== Aguascalientes ====
▌▌Martha Márquez Alvarado (PAN, then PT) (until 5 March 2022; 8 June 2022 – 4 March 2024; since 4 June 2024)

▌Adriana Guadalupe Jurado Valadez (PAN) (8 March 2022 – 8 June 2022; 6 March 2024 – 3 June 2024)

▌Juan Antonio Martín del Campo (PAN)
▌Daniel Gutiérrez Castorena (MORENA)

==== Baja California ====
▌▌Jaime Bonilla Valdez (MORENA, then PT) (28 March 2022 – 5 May 2022; since 10 August 2022) (Note: In Baja California: Jaime Bonilla Valdez switched to the Labor Party on 23 March 2023.)

▌ Gerardo Novelo Osuna (MORENA) (until 25 March 2022)
Vacant (5 May 2022 – 10 August 2022)

▌▌▌Alejandra León Gastélum (I, then MC, then MORENA) (Note: In Baja California: Alejandra León Gastélum joined Citizens' Movement on 23 September 2022. She returned to Morena on 26 April 2024 after having left the party in 2021.)
▌Gina Cruz Blackledge (PAN)

==== Baja California Sur ====
▌Ricardo Velázquez Meza (MORENA)
▌Lucía Trasviña Waldenrath (MORENA)
▌María Guadalupe Saldaña Cisneros (PAN) (until 5 October 2021; since 8 November 2021)

▌Audelia Esthela Villarreal Zavala (PAN) (5 October – 8 November 2021)

==== Campeche ====
▌Aníbal Ostoa Ortega (MORENA) (until 15 September 2021; since 1 October 2023)

▌ Arturo Moo Cahuich (MORENA) (15 September 2021 – 1 October 2023)

▌▌Cecilia Margarita Sánchez García (MORENA, then PRI) (Note: In Campeche: Cecilia Margarita Sánchez García switched to the Institutional Revolutionary Party on 15 October 2023)
▌Rocío Abreu Artiñano (MORENA)

==== Chiapas ====
▌Eduardo Ramírez Aguilar (MORENA) (until 1 February 2024) (Note: In Chiapas: Eduardo Ramírez Aguilar took a leave of absence to run in the 2024 Chiapas gubernatorial election. His alternate, José Antonio Aguilar Castillejos, took his place in the Senate.)

▌José Antonio Aguilar Castillejos (MORENA) (since 1 February 2024)

▌Sasil de León Villard (PES)
▌Noé Castañón Ramírez (MC)

==== Chihuahua ====
▌Bertha Caraveo Camarena (MORENA)
▌Cruz Pérez Cuéllar (MORENA) (until 9 September 2021)

▌ Rafael Espino de la Peña (MORENA) (since 10 September 2021)

▌▌Gustavo Madero Muñoz (PAN, then I) (Note: In Chihuahua: Gustavo Madero Muñoz left the National Action Party's parliamentary group on 28 September 2021 in order to form Grupo Plural, a new parliamentary group.)

==== Coahuila ====
▌Armando Guadiana Tijerina (MORENA) (until 31 December 2022; 12 June – 23 October 2023) (Note: In Coahuila: Armando Guadiana Tijerina took a leave of absence due to his declining health. His alternate, Reyes Flores Hurtado, took his place in the Senate. After Guadiana's death on 26 December 2023, Flores completed the remainder of the term.)

▌ Reyes Flores Hurtado (MORENA) (8 February – 12 June 2023; since 23 October 2023)

▌Eva Galaz Caletti (MORENA)
▌Verónica Martínez García (PRI)

==== Colima ====
▌Joel Padilla Peña (PT)
▌Gricelda Valencia de la Mora (MORENA)
▌Gabriela Benavides Cobos (PVEM)

==== Mexico City ====
▌César Cravioto Romero (MORENA)
▌Citlalli Hernández Mora (MORENA) (since 18 April 2022)

▌María Celeste Sánchez Sugía (MORENA) (until 18 April 2022)

▌▌Emilio Álvarez Icaza (I, then PRD) (Note: In Mexico City: Emilio Álvarez Icaza joined the Party of the Democratic Revolution on 16 April 2024.)

==== Durango ====
▌Alejandro González Yáñez (PT) (until 2 March 2022; since 1 August 2022)

▌ Miguel Ángel Lucero Olivas (PT) (2 March – 1 August 2022)

▌Margarita Valdéz Martínez (MORENA)
▌José Ramón Enríquez Herrera (MORENA)

==== Guanajuato ====
▌Alejandra Reynoso Sánchez (PAN)
▌Erandi Bermúdez Méndez (PAN)
▌Martha Lucía Mícher Camarena (MORENA)

==== Guerrero ====
▌Félix Salgado Macedonio (MORENA)
▌Nestora Salgado (MORENA)
▌Manuel Añorve Baños (PRI)

==== Hidalgo ====
▌ María Merced González González (MORENA)
▌Julio Menchaca Salazar (MORENA) (until 15 February 2022)

▌ Navor Rojas Mancera (MORENA) (since 15 February 2022)

▌▌Nuvia Mayorga Delgado (PRI, then PVEM) (Note: In Hidalgo: Nuvia Mayorga Delgado left the Institutional Revolutionary Party on 1 July 2023 and joined the Ecologist Green Party of Mexico on 31 August 2023.)

==== Jalisco ====
▌Clemente Castañeda Hoeflich (MC)
▌Verónica Delgadillo García (MC) (until 18 November 2023)

▌ Ruth Alejandra López Hernández (MC) (since 22 November 2023)

▌▌María Antonia Cárdenas Mariscal (MORENA, then MC) (Note: In Jalisco: María Antonia Cárdenas Mariscal switched to Citizens' Movement on 28 February 2024.)

==== State of Mexico ====
▌Delfina Gómez Álvarez (MORENA) (7 September 2022 – 1 January 2023)

▌ Martha Guerrero Sánchez (MORENA) (until 6 September 2022; 1 January 2023 – 9 April 2024; since 3 June 2024)
Vacant (9 April 2024 – 3 June 2024)

▌Higinio Martínez Miranda (MORENA) (until 2 March 2023; 1 August – 16 September 2023; since 24 November 2023)

▌ Ricardo Morena Bastida (MORENA) (3 March – 1 August 2023; 3 October – 24 November 2023)

▌Juan Zepeda Hernández (MC) (until 24 April 2024; since 3 June 2024)

▌ Omar Obed Maceda Luna (PRD) (24 April – 3 June 2024)

==== Michoacán ====
▌Blanca Estela Piña Gudiño (MORENA)
▌Cristóbal Arias Solís (MORENA)
▌Antonio García Conejo (PRD)

==== Morelos ====
▌Lucía Meza Guzmán (PRI)
▌Sergio Pérez Flores (MORENA)
▌Ángel García Yáñez (PRI)

==== Nayarit ====
▌Cora Cecilia Pinedo Alonso (PT)
▌Rosa Elena Jiménez Arteaga (MORENA)
▌▌Gloria Elizabeth Núñez Sánchez (PAN, then MC) (Note: In Nayarit: Gloria Elizabeth Núñez Sánchez left the National Action Party on 27 April 2022. She joined Citizens' Movement on 5 July 2022.)

==== Nuevo León ====
▌Luis David Ortiz Salinas (MC)
▌▌▌Indira Kempis Martínez (MC, then I, then PRI) (Note: In Nuevo León: Indira Kempis Martínez left the Citizens' Movement parliamentary group on 21 December 2023. She remained as an independent until 19 January 2024, when she joined the Institutional Revolutionary Party.)
▌Víctor Oswaldo Fuentes Solís (PAN)

==== Oaxaca ====
▌Susana Harp (MORENA)
▌Salomón Jara Cruz (MORENA) (until 16 December 2021)

▌Adolfo Gómez Hernández (MORENA) (since 16 December 2021)

▌Raúl Bolaños Cacho Cué (PVEM)

==== Puebla ====
▌Alejandro Armenta Mier (MORENA) (until 1 March 2024)

▌Jesús Encinas Meneses (I) (since 1 March 2024) (Note: In Puebla: Jesús Encinas Meneses, who had served as an alternate senator for Morena in 2019, became an independent the same day he returned to the Senate.)

▌▌▌▌Nancy de la Sierra Arámburo (PT, then I, then PRI, then I) (Note: In Puebla: Nancy de la Sierra Arámburo became an independent on 28 September 2021 to form the Grupo Plural parliamentary group. She joined the Institutional Revolutionary Party on 3 October 2023, before switching back to independent on 18 July 2024 due to her disagreements with Alejandro Moreno's possible reelection as party president.)
▌▌Nadia Navarro Acevedo (PAN, then PRI) (Note: In Puebla: Nadia Navarro Acevedo switched to the Institutional Revolutionary Party on 13 December 2023.)

==== Querétaro ====
▌José Alfredo Botello Montes (PAN)
▌Guadalupe Murguía Gutiérrez (PAN) (until 10 September 2021)

▌Estrella Rojas Loreto (PAN) (since 13 September 2021)

▌Gilberto Herrera Ruiz (MORENA)

==== Quintana Roo ====
▌Marybel Villegas Canché (MORENA)
▌▌José Luis Pech Várguez (MORENA, then MC) (until 5 March 2022; since 8 June 2022) (Note: In Quintana Roo: On returning from his leave, José Luis Pech Várguez switched to Citizens' Movement on 8 June 2022.)

▌Rogelio Márquez Valdivia (MORENA) (8 March – 8 June 2022)

▌Mayuli Martínez Simón (PAN)

==== San Luis Potosí ====
▌Graciela Gaitán Díaz (PVEM)
▌▌Marco Antonio Gama Basarte (PAN, then MC) (Note: In San Luis Potosí: Marco Antonio Gama Basarte switched to Citizens' Movement on 21 March 2022.)
▌Primo Dothé Mata (MORENA)

==== Sinaloa ====
▌Raúl Elenes Angulo (MORENA)
▌Imelda Castro Castro (MORENA)
▌Mario Zamora Gastelum (PRI)

==== Sonora ====
▌Lilly Téllez (PAN)
▌Arturo Bours Griffith (MORENA)
▌Sylvana Beltrones Sánchez (PRI)

==== Tabasco ====
▌Mónica Fernández Balboa (MORENA)
▌Ovidio Peralta Suárez (MORENA)
▌Juan Manuel Fócil Pérez (PRD)

==== Tamaulipas ====
▌Américo Villarreal Anaya (MORENA) (until 2 January 2022)

▌Faustino López Vargas (MORENA) (2 January 2022 – 8 October 2022)
▌José Ramón Gómez Leal (MORENA) (Note: Following Villarreal Anaya's election as governor and López Vargas's death in a car crash, Gómez Leal and López Carreto were elected in a special election held on 19 February 2023.) (7 March 2023 – 20 February 2024)
▌Indira Paola López Carreto (MORENA) (since 20 February 2024)

▌María Guadalupe Covarrubias Cervantes (MORENA)
▌Ismael García Cabeza de Vaca (PAN)

==== Tlaxcala ====
▌Ana Lilia Rivera Rivera (MORENA)
▌José Antonio Álvarez Lima (MORENA)
▌Minerva Hernández Ramos (PAN)

==== Veracruz ====
▌Gloria Sánchez Hernández (MORENA)
▌Ernesto Pérez Astorga (MORENA)
▌Julen Rementería del Puerto (PAN)

==== Yucatán ====
▌▌Jorge Carlos Ramírez Marín (PRI, then PVEM) (Note: In Yucatán: Jorge Carlos Ramírez Marín switched to the Ecologist Green Party of Mexico on 27 September 2023.)
▌Verónica Camino Farjat (MORENA)
▌▌Raúl Paz Alonzo (PAN, then MORENA) (Note: In Yucatán: Raúl Paz Alonzo switched to Morena on 20 September 2022.)

==== Zacatecas ====
▌Soledad Luévano Cantú (MORENA)
▌José Narro Céspedes (MORENA)
▌Claudia Anaya Mota (PRI)

==== Elected by proportional representation ====
▌Josefina Vázquez Mota (PAN)
▌Xóchitl Gálvez Ruiz (PAN) (until 20 November 2023; since 4 June 2024)

▌Laura Ballesteros Mancilla (MC) (22 November 2023 – 3 June 2024)

▌Indira Rosales San Román (PAN)
▌Damián Zepeda Vidales (PAN)
▌Kenia López Rabadán (PAN) (until 1 December 2023; since 5 February 2024)

▌Yadhira Yvette Tamayo Herrera (PAN) (5 December 2023 – 5 February 2024)

▌Roberto Moya Clemente (PAN)
▌▌Claudia Ruiz Massieu Salinas (PRI, then I) (Note: Claudia Ruiz Massieu Salinas left the Institutional Revolutionary Party parliamentary group on 1 July 2023.)
▌Carlos Humberto Aceves (PRI)
▌Nancy Guadalupe Sánchez Arredondo (MORENA)
▌▌Miguel Ángel Osorio Chong (PRI, then I) (Note: Miguel Ángel Osorio Chong left the Institutional Revolutionary Party parliamentary group on 1 July 2023.)
▌Beatriz Paredes Rangel (PRI)
▌▌Eruviel Ávila Villegas (PRI, then PVEM) (Note: Eruviel Ávila Villegas switched to the Ecologist Green Party of Mexico on 24 January 2024.)
▌Miguel Ángel Mancera (PRD)
▌▌Israel Zamora Guzmán (PVEM, then MORENA) (Note: Israel Zamora Guzmán left the Ecologist Green Party of Mexico on 22 February 2024 and joined MORENA on 6 March 2024.)
▌Geovanna Bañuelos de la Torre (PT)
▌Alejandra Lagunes (PVEM)
▌Manuel Velasco Coello (PVEM)
▌Patricia Mercado (MC)
▌Dante Delgado Rannauro (MC)
▌Elvia Marcela Mora Arellano (PES)
▌Katya Elizabeth Ávila Vázquez (PES)
▌Eunice Renata Romo Molina (PES)
▌Antares Vázquez Alatorre (MORENA)
▌Héctor Vasconcelos (MORENA) (until 14 December 2023)

Vacant (since 14 December 2023)

▌Olga Sánchez Cordero (MORENA)
▌Ricardo Monreal Ávila (MORENA)
▌Ifigenia Martínez (MORENA)
▌Napoleón Gómez Urrutia (MORENA)
▌▌Germán Martínez Cázares (MORENA, then I) (Note: Germán Martínez Cázares left MORENA on 3 November 2021 to become an independent. That same day, he joined the Grupo Plural parliamentary group.)
▌Casimiro Méndez Ortiz (MORENA)
▌Gabriel García Hernández (MORENA)
▌▌Claudia Balderas Espinoza (MORENA, then PRI) (Note: Claudia Balderas Espinoza switched to the Institutional Revolutionary Party on 12 December 2023.)

=== Chamber of Deputies ===
==== Single-member districts ====
State	District	Deputy	Party	State	District	Deputy	Party
Aguascalientes	01	Noel Mata Atilano		Mexico City	09	Guadalupe Chavira de la Rosa	
Aguascalientes	02	Mónica Becerra Moreno		Mexico City	10	Margarita Zavala	
Aguascalientes	03	Paulo Gonzalo Martínez López		Mexico City	11	Lidia Pérez Bárcenas	
Baja California	01	Yesenia Olúa González		Mexico City	12	Gabriela Sodi Miranda	
Baja California	02	Julieta Ramírez Padilla		Mexico City	13	Óscar Gutiérrez Camacho	
Baja California	03	Armando Reyes Ledesma		Mexico City	14	Rocío Banquells	
Baja California	04	Socorro Irma Andazola Gómez		Mexico City	15	Luis Mendoza Acevedo	
Baja California	05	Evangelina Moreno Guerra		Mexico City	16	Xavier González Zirión	
Baja California	06	Héctor Mares Cossío		Mexico City	17	Jorge Triana Tena	
Baja California	07	Isaías Bertín Sandoval		Mexico City	18	Raúl Jiménez Rodríguez; Replacing Marcelino Castañeda Navarrete	
Baja California	08	Fausto Gallardo García		Mexico City	19	Aleida Alavez Ruiz	
Baja California Sur	01	Marco Antonio Almendáriz Puppo		Mexico City	20	Ana Karina Rojo Pimentel	
Baja California Sur	02	Alfredo Porras Domínguez		Mexico City	21	Flor Ivone Morales Miranda	
Campeche	01	José Luis Flores Pacheco		Mexico City	22	Víctor Varela López	
Campeche	02	María Sierra Damián		Mexico City	23	Gabriel Quadri	
Chiapas	01	Manuela Obrador Narváez		Mexico City	24	Héctor Saúl Téllez Hernández	
Chiapas	02	Adela Ramos Juárez		Michoacán	01	Leonel Godoy Rangel	
Chiapas	03	Alfredo Vázquez Vázquez		Michoacán	02	Mauricio Prieto Gómez	
Chiapas	04	Joaquín Zebadúa Alva		Michoacán	03	Mary Carmen Bernal Martínez	
Chiapas	05	Yeimi Aguilar Cifuentes		Michoacán	04	Rodrigo Sánchez Zepeda	
Chiapas	06	Jorge Luis Llaven Abarca		Michoacán	05	Enrique Godínez Del Río	
Chiapas	07	Manuel Narcia Coutiño		Michoacán	06	Berenice Juárez Navarrete	
Chiapas	08	Ismael Brito Mazariegos		Michoacán	07	Adriana Campos Huirache	
Chiapas	09	Adriana Bustamante Castellanos		Michoacán	08	Roberto Carlos López García	
Chiapas	10	María del Carmen Fernández Benavente; Replacing Juan Pablo Montes de Oca Avendaño		Michoacán	09	Carlos Alberto Manzo Rodríguez	
Chiapas	11	Roberto Rubio Montejo		Michoacán	10	Carlos Quintana Martínez	
Chiapas	12	José Luis Elorza Flores		Michoacán	11	Macarena Chávez Flores	
Chiapas	13	Luis Armando Melgar Bravo		Michoacán	12	Francisco Javier Huacus Esquivel	
Chihuahua	01	Daniel Murguía Lardizábal		Morelos	01	Jorge Alberto Barrera Toledo	
Chihuahua	02	Maité Vargas Meraz		Morelos	02	Alejandra Pani Barragán	
Chihuahua	03	Lilia Aguilar Gil		Morelos	03	Juanita Guerra Mena	
Chihuahua	04	Daniela Álvarez Hernández		Morelos	04	Brenda Espinoza López	
Chihuahua	05	Salvador Alcántar Ortega; Replacing Mario Mata Carrasco		Morelos	05	José Guadalupe Ambrocio Gachuz	
Chihuahua	06	Laura Contreras Duarte		Nayarit	01	Miguel Pavel Jarero Velázquez	
Chihuahua	07	Patricia Terrazas Baca		Nayarit	02	Jasmine María Bugarín Rodríguez	
Chihuahua	08	Rocío González Alonso		Nayarit	03	Jorge Armando Ortiz Rodríguez	
Chihuahua	09	Ángeles Gutiérrez Valdez		Nuevo León	01	Héctor Castillo Olivares	
Coahuila	01	Brígido Moreno Hernández		Nuevo León	02	Andrés Cantú Ramírez	
Coahuila	02	Francisco Javier Borrego Adame		Nuevo León	03	Wendy Cordero González	
Coahuila	03	Alma Patricia Cardona Ortiz; Replacing Cristina Amezcua González		Nuevo León	04	Pedro Salgado Almaguer	
Coahuila	04	Jericó Abramo Masso		Nuevo León	05	Marcela Guerra Castillo	
Coahuila	05	José Antonio Gutiérrez Jardón		Nuevo León	06	Annia Gómez Cárdenas	
Coahuila	06	Shamir Fernández Hernández		Nuevo León	07	Andrés Pintos Caballero	
Coahuila	07	Jaime Bueno Zertuche		Nuevo León	08	María de Jesús Aguirre Maldonado	
Colima	01	Riult Rivera Gutiérrez		Nuevo León	09	Juan Francisco Espinosa Eguía	
Colima	02	María del Carmen Zúñiga Cuevas; Replacing Rosa María Bayardo Cabrera		Nuevo León	10	Karina Barrón Perales	
Durango	01	Francisco Castrellón Garza		Nuevo León	11	Pedro Garza Treviño	
Durango	02	Omar Castañeda González		Nuevo León	12	José Luis Garza Ochoa	
Durango	03	Martha Alicia Arreola Martínez; Replacing Maribel Aguilera Cháirez		Oaxaca	01	Ángel Domínguez Escobar	
Durango	04	Gina Campuzano González		Oaxaca	02	Irma Juan Carlos	
Guanajuato	01	Berenice Montes Estrada		Oaxaca	03	Margarita García García	
Guanajuato	02	Ricardo Villarreal García		Oaxaca	04	Azael Santiago Chepi	
Guanajuato	03	Fernando Torres Graciano		Oaxaca	05	Carol Antonio Altamirano	
Guanajuato	04	Juan Carlos Romero Hicks		Oaxaca	06	Beatriz Pérez López	
Guanajuato	05	Éctor Jaime Ramírez Barba		Oaxaca	07	José Antonio Estefan Gillessen	
Guanajuato	06	Alma Cristina Rodríguez Vallejo; Replacing Ana María Esquivel Arrona		Oaxaca	08	Benjamín Robles Montoya	
Guanajuato	07	Michel González Márquez		Oaxaca	09	María del Carmen Bautista Pelaez	
Guanajuato	08	Justino Arriaga Rojas		Oaxaca	10	Daniel Gutiérrez Gutiérrez	
Guanajuato	09	José Salvador Tovar Vargas; Replacing Jorge Romero Vázquez		Puebla	01	Marco Antonio Natale Gutiérrez	
Guanajuato	10	Pedro David Ortega Fonseca		Puebla	02	Fátima Cruz Peláez	
Guanajuato	11	Jorge Espadas Galván		Puebla	03	Esther Martínez Romano	
Guanajuato	12	Sarai Núñez Cerón		Puebla	04	Inés Parra Juárez	
Guanajuato	13	Emmanuel Reyes Carmona		Puebla	05	Jaime Baltierra García; Replacing Mauricio Toledo Gutiérrez	
Guanajuato	14	Esther Mandujano Tinajero		Puebla	06	Alejandro Carvajal Hidalgo	
Guanajuato	15	Itzel Balderas Hernández		Puebla	07	Raymundo Atanacio Luna	
Guerrero	01	Reynel Rodríguez Muñoz		Puebla	08	Odette Nayeri Almazán Múñoz	
Guerrero	02	Araceli Ocampo Manzanares		Puebla	09	Ana Teresa Aranda	
Guerrero	03	Luis Edgardo Palacios Díaz		Puebla	10	Humberto Aguilar Coronado	
Guerrero	04	Pablo Amílcar Sandoval		Puebla	11	Carolina Beauregard Martínez	
Guerrero	05	Victoriano Wences Real		Puebla	12	Mario Riestra Piña	
Guerrero	06	Fabiola Rafael Dircio		Puebla	13	Mario Miguel Carrillo Cubillas	
Guerrero	07	Carlos Sánchez Barrios		Puebla	14	Nelly Maceda Carrera	
Guerrero	08	Eunice Monzón García		Puebla	15	Araceli Celestino Rosas	
Guerrero	09	Rosario Merlín García		Querétaro	01	Sonia Rocha Acosta	
Hidalgo	01	Sayonara Vargas Rodríguez		Querétaro	02	Marcia Solórzano Gallego	
Hidalgo	02	Ciria Yamile Salomón Durán		Querétaro	03	Ignacio Loyola Vera	
Hidalgo	03	Yolis Jiménez Ramírez; Replacing Simey Olvera Bautista		Querétaro	04	Felipe Fernando Macías Olvera	
Hidalgo	04	María Isabel Alfaro Morales		Querétaro	05	Erika Díaz Villalón	
Hidalgo	05	Cuauhtémoc Ochoa Fernández		Quintana Roo	01	Juan Luis Carrillo Soberanis	
Hidalgo	06	Lidia García Anaya		Quintana Roo	02	Anahí González Hernández	
Hidalgo	07	Miguel Ángel Pérez Navarrete; Replacing Navor Rojas Mancera		Quintana Roo	03	Alberto Batun Chulim	
Jalisco	01	Gustavo Macías Zambrano		Quintana Roo	04	Laura Fernández Piña	
Jalisco	02	Martha Romo Cuéllar		San Luis Potosí	01	Alejandro Segovia Hernández	
Jalisco	03	Desiderio Tinajero Robles		San Luis Potosí	02	Juan Manuel Navarro Muñíz	
Jalisco	04	Taygete Irisay Rodríguez González		San Luis Potosí	03	Kevin Angelo Aguilar Piña	
Jalisco	05	Bruno Blancas Mercado		San Luis Potosí	04	Antolin Guerrero Márquez	
Jalisco	06	Manuel Herrera Vega		San Luis Potosí	05	José Antonio Zapata Meráz	
Jalisco	07	Alberto Villa Villegas		San Luis Potosí	06	Gilberto Hernández Villafuerte	
Jalisco	08	Mauro Garza Marín		San Luis Potosí	07	Christian Joaquín Sánchez Sánchez	
Jalisco	09	María del Rocío Corona Nakamura		Sinaloa	01	Leobardo Alcántara Martínez	
Jalisco	10	Horacio Fernández Castillo		Sinaloa	02	Ana Elizabeth Ayala Leyva	
Jalisco	11	Claudia Delgadillo González		Sinaloa	03	Jesús Fernando García Hernández	
Jalisco	12	María Asención Álvarez Solís		Sinaloa	04	Casimiro Zamora Valdéz	
Jalisco	13	Sergio Barrera Sepúlveda		Sinaloa	05	Yadira Santiago Marcos	
Jalisco	14	María Leticia Chávez Pérez		Sinaloa	06	Olegaria Carrazco Macías	
Jalisco	15	Ana Laura Sánchez Velázquez		Sinaloa	07	Merary Villegas Sánchez	
Jalisco	16	Laura Imelda Pérez Segura		Sonora	01	Manuel de Jesús Baldenebro Arredondo	
Jalisco	17	José Guadalupe Buenrostro Martínez; Replacing Antonio de Jesús Ramírez Ramos		Sonora	02	Ana Bernal Camarena	
Jalisco	18	José Guadalupe Fletes Araiza		Sonora	03	Rosangela Amairany Peña Escalante; Replacing Lorenia Valles Sampedro	
Jalisco	19	Luz Adriana Candelario Figueroa		Sonora	04	Bernardo Ríos Cheno; Replacing Heriberto Aguilar Castillo	
Jalisco	20	María del Refugio Camarena Jauregui		Sonora	05	Judith Tanori Córdova; Replacing Wendy Briceño Zuloaga	
México	01	Miguel Sámano Peralta		Sonora	06	Gabriela Martínez Espinoza	
México	02	Dionicia Vázquez García		Sonora	07	Shirley Guadalupe Vázquez Romero	
México	03	Oscar Cárdenas Monroy		Tabasco	01	Ismael Saúl Plankarte Rivera; Replacing Marcos Rosendo Medina Filigrana	
México	04	María Cristina Vargas Osnaya; Replacing Nelly Carrasco Godínez		Tabasco	02	Karla María Rabelo Estrada	
México	05	Francisco Favela Peñuñuri		Tabasco	03	Lorena Méndez Denis	
México	06	Ali Sayuri Núñez Meneses		Tabasco	04	Manuel Rodríguez González	
México	07	Joanna Alejandra Felipe Torres		Tabasco	05	Janicie Contreras García	
México	08	Gustavo Contreras Montes		Tabasco	06	Mario Rafael Llergo Latournerie	
México	09	Eduardo Zarzosa Sánchez		Tamaulipas	01	Ana Laura Huerta Valdovinos	
México	10	Alma Delia Navarrete Rivera		Tamaulipas	02	Olga Juliana Elizondo Guerra	
México	11	María Eugenia Hernández Pérez		Tamaulipas	03	Juan González Lima; Replacing Tomás Gloria Requena	
México	12	Armando Corona Arvizu		Tamaulipas	04	Elva Agustina Vigil Hernández; Replacing Adriana Lozano Rodríguez	
México	13	Olimpia Tamara Girón Hernández		Tamaulipas	05	Óscar Almaraz Smer	
México	14	Ana María Balderas Trejo		Tamaulipas	06	Vicente Verástegui Ostos	
México	15	Carlos Madrazo Limón		Tamaulipas	07	Erasmo González Robledo	
México	16	Marisela Garduño Garduño		Tamaulipas	08	Rosa María González Azcárraga	
México	17	María Guadalupe Román Ávila		Tamaulipas	09	Claudia Alejandra Hernández Sáenz	
México	18	José Antonio García García		Tlaxcala	01	José Alejandro Aguilar López	
México	19	Krishna Romero Velázquez		Tlaxcala	02	Irma Yordana Garay Loredo	
México	20	Juan Pablo Sánchez Rodríguez		Tlaxcala	03	Carlos Augusto Pérez Hernández	
México	21	Graciela Sánchez Ortiz		Veracruz	01	Armando Antonio Gómez Betancourt	
México	22	Iván Arturo Rodríguez Rivera		Veracruz	02	María del Carmen Pinete Vargas	
México	23	Martha Azucena Camacho Reynoso		Veracruz	03	Rocío Hernández Villanueva; Replacing Bertha Espinoza Segura	
México	24	Gabriela Olvera Higuera		Veracruz	04	Rosa Hernández Espejo	
México	25	Carlos López Guadarrama		Veracruz	05	Raquel Bonilla Herrera	
México	26	Melissa Vargas Camacho		Veracruz	06	Jaime Humberto Pérez Bernabé	
México	27	Ana Lilia Herrera Anzaldo		Veracruz	07	Mónica Herrera Villavicencio	
México	28	Roberto Ángel Domínguez Rodríguez		Veracruz	08	Natalia García Molina; Replacing Claudia Tello Espinosa	
México	29	Martha Robles Ortiz		Veracruz	09	José Francisco Yunes Zorrilla	
México	30	César Agustín Hernández Pérez		Veracruz	10	Rafael Hernández Villalpando	
México	31	Juan Ángel Bautista Bravo		Veracruz	11	Flora Tania Cruz Santos	
México	32	Luis Enrique Martínez Ventura		Veracruz	12	María Josefina Gamboa Torales	
México	33	Vicente Onofre Vázquez		Veracruz	13	Angélica Peña Martínez	
México	34	María Teresa Castell de Oro Palacios		Veracruz	14	Rosalba Valencia Cruz	
México	35	Arturo Roberto Hernández Tapia		Veracruz	15	Dulce María Corina Villegas Guarneros	
México	36	Jazmín Jaimes Albarrán		Veracruz	16	Martha Rosa Morales Romero	
México	37	Javier Huerta Jurado		Veracruz	17	Valentín Reyes López	
México	38	Karla Yuritzi Almazán Burgos		Veracruz	18	Itzel Aleli Domínguez Zopiyactle	
México	39	Alan Castellanos Ramírez		Veracruz	19	Paola Tenorio Adame	
México	40	Javier González Zepeda		Veracruz	20	Esteban Bautista Hernández	
México	41	Sue Ellen Bernal Bolnik		Yucatán	01	Sergio Chale Cauich	
Mexico City	01	Vanessa del Castillo Ibarra		Yucatán	02	Mario Xavier Peraza Ramírez	
Mexico City	02	Maribel Villaseñor Dávila		Yucatán	03	Rommel Pacheco	
Mexico City	03	Wendy González Urrutia		Yucatán	04	Beatriz Zavala Peniche; Replacing Cecilia Patrón Laviada	
Mexico City	04	Gerardo Fernández Noroña		Yucatán	05	Consuelo del Carmen Navarrete Navarro	
Mexico City	05	Karla Ayala Villalobos		Zacatecas	01	Bennelly Hernández Ruedas	
Mexico City	06	Diana Lara Carreón		Zacatecas	02	Miguel Ángel Varela Pinedo	
Mexico City	07	Beatriz Rojas Martínez		Zacatecas	03	Alfredo Femat Bañuelos	
Mexico City	08	María Rosete Sánchez		Zacatecas	04	Carolina Dávila Ramírez	

==== Proportional representation ====
Region	Deputy	Party	Region	Deputy	Party
First	Rocío Reza Gallegos		Third	Ivonne Ortega Pacheco	
First	Luis Gerardo Serrato Castell		Third	Braulio López Ochoa Mijares; Replacing Gerardo Gaudiano Rovirosa	
First	Paulina Rubio Fernández		Third	Rosa María Alvarado Murguía	
First	Eliseo Compeán Fernández		Third	Óscar Cantón Zetina	
First	Sonia Murillo Manríquez		Third	Patricia Armendáriz	
First	Juan Carlos Maturino Manzanera		Third	Manuel Vázquez Arellano	
First	Lizbeth Mata Lozano		Third	Blanca Carolina Pérez Gutiérrez	
First	Miguel Ángel Monraz Ibarra		Third	Alfredo Aurelio González Cruz	
First	Miriam Janeth Ladrón de Guevara González; Replacing Laura Haro Ramírez		Third	Rosalinda Domínguez Flores	
First	Ismael Hernández Deras		Third	Iran Santiago Manuel	
First	Paloma Sánchez Ramos		Third	Sonia Rincón Chanona	
First	Hiram Hernández Zetina		Third	Mario Alberto Torres Escudero	
First	Nelida Ivonne Díaz Tejeda		Third	Rocío Natali Barrera Puc	
First	Mariano González Aguirre		Third	Armando Contreras Castillo	
First	María José Sánchez Escobedo; Replacing Yolanda de la Torre		Third	Mayra Alicia Mendoza Álvarez	
First	Leslie Estefanía Rodríguez Sarabia		Third	Faustino Vidal Benavides	
First	María de Jesús Páez Guereca; Replacing Celeste Sánchez Romero		Third	Ivonne Cisneros Luján	
First	Arturo González Cruz		Third	Zeus García Sandoval	
First	Mirza Flores Gómez		Third	Leonor Coutiño Gutiérrez	
First	Jorge Álvarez Máynez		Third	Jorge Ángel Sibaja Mendoza	
First	María Elena Limón García		Fourth	Jorge Romero Herrera	
First	Salvador Caro Cabrera		Fourth	Mariana Gómez del Campo	
First	Julieta Mejía Ibáñez		Fourth	Miguel Rodarte de Lara; Replacing Santiago Creel	
First	Mario Alberto Rodríguez Carrillo		Fourth	Genoveva Huerta Villegas	
First	Elvia Yolanda Martínez Cosío		Fourth	Santiago Torreblanca Engell	
First	Rubén Gregorio Muñoz Alvarez		Fourth	Lilia Caritina Olvera Coronel	
First	Sandra Luz Navarro Conkle		Fourth	Yesenia Galarza Castro	
First	Armando Cabada Alvídrez		Fourth	Guillermo Octavio Huerta Ling	
First	Zulema Adams Pereyra		Fourth	Ana Laura Valenzuela Sánchez	
First	Antonio Pérez Garibay		Fourth	Alejandro Moreno Cárdenas	
First	Susana Prieto Terrazas		Fourth	Guadalupe Alcántara Rojas	
First	Maximiano Barboza Llamas		Fourth	Eduardo Murat Hinojosa	
First	Cecilia Márquez Alkadef Cortés		Fourth	Cynthia López Castro	
First	Manuel Guillermo Chapman Moreno		Fourth	Lázaro Jiménez Aquino	
First	Brianda Aurora Vázquez Álvarez		Fourth	Blanca Alcalá Ruiz	
First	Juan Guadalupe Torres Navarro		Fourth	Augusto Gómez Villanueva	
First	Andrea Chávez Treviño		Fourth	Luis Espinosa Cházaro	
First	Jesús Roberto Briano Borunda		Fourth	Elizabeth Pérez Valdez	
First	Martha Nabetse Arellano Reyes		Fourth	Magdalena Núñez Monreal	
First	Hamlet García Almaguer		Fourth	Pedro Vázquez González	
Second	María Elena Pérez-Jaén Zermeño; Replacing María Teresa Jiménez Esquivel		Fourth	Nayeli Arlen Fernández Cruz	
Second	José Luis Báez Guerrero		Fourth	Javier López Casarín	
Second	Mariana Mancillas Cabrera		Fourth	Oscar Moguel Ballado; Salomón Chertorivski Woldenberg	
Second	Román Cifuentes Negrete		Fourth	Jessica Ortega De la Cruz	
Second	Mariela López Sosa		Fourth	Miguel Torruco Garza	
Second	Paulina Aguado Romero		Fourth	Marisol García Segura	
Second	Víctor Manuel Pérez Díaz		Fourth	Ignacio Mier Velazco	
Second	Nora Elva Oranday Aguirre		Fourth	Dulce María Silva Hernández	
Second	Xavier Azuara Zúñiga		Fourth	Alejandro Robles Gómez	
Second	Noemí Luna Ayala		Fourth	Brenda Ramiro Alejo	
Second	César Augusto Rendón García; Replacing Gerardo Peña Flores		Fourth	Sergio Peñaloza Pérez	
Second	Diana Gutiérrez Valtierra		Fourth	Julieta Vences Valencia	
Second	Montserrat Arcos Velázquez		Fourth	Elena Segura Trejo; Replacing Julio César Moreno Rivera	
Second	Rubén Moreira Valdez		Fourth	María del Rosario Reyes Silva	
Second	Fuensanta Guadalupe Guerrero Esquivel		Fourth	Fernando Marín Díaz	
Second	Rodrigo Fuentes Ávila		Fourth	María Clemente García Moreno	
Second	Frinné Azuara Yarzábal		Fourth	Klaus Ritter Ocampo	
Second	Ildefonso Guajardo Villarreal		Fourth	Selene Ávila Flores	
Second	Sofía Carvajal Isunza		Fourth	Carlos Ortiz Tejeda	
Second	Tereso Medina Ramírez		Fourth	María Magdalena Esquivel Nava	
Second	Miguel Torres Rosales		Fifth	Armando Tejeda Cid	
Second	Alberto Anaya		Fifth	Leticia Zepeda Martínez	
Second	Sonia Mendoza Díaz		Fifth	Jorge Ernesto Inzunza Armas	
Second	Carlos Alberto Puente Salas		Fifth	Julia Licet Jiménez Angulo	
Second	Mary José Alcalá		Fifth	Anuar Azar Figueroa	
Second	Pablo Gil Delgado Ventura; Replacing Agustín Basave Alanís		Fifth	Anabey García Velasco	
Second	Amalia García		Fifth	Carolina Viggiano Austria	
Second	Arturo de la Garza Garza		Fifth	Ricardo Aguilar Castillo	
Second	Olga Leticia Chávez Rojas		Fifth	Cristina Ruiz Sandoval	
Second	Blanca Araceli Narro Panameño		Fifth	Carlos Iriarte Mercado	
Second	Carlos Noriega Romero		Fifth	Laura Barrera Fortoul	
Second	Martha Barajas García		Fifth	Marco Antonio Mendoza Bustamante	
Second	Saúl Hernández Hernández		Fifth	Norma Angélica Aceves García	
Second	Roberto Valenzuela Corral		Fifth	Javier Casique Zárate	
Second	Juan Ramiro Robledo		Fifth	María Elena Serrano Maldonado	
Second	Salma Luévano Luna		Fifth	Brasil Acosta Peña	
Second	Esther Berenice Martínez Díaz		Fifth	Johana Montcerrat Hernández Pérez	
Second	Marco Antonio Flores Sánchez		Fifth	Edna Díaz Acevedo	
Second	Karla Estrella Díaz García		Fifth	Héctor Chávez Ruiz	
Second	Mauricio Cantú González		Fifth	Reginaldo Sandoval Flores	
Third	María del Carmen Escudero Fabre		Fifth	Luis Alberto Martínez Bravo	
Third	Carlos Alberto Valenzuela González		Fifth	Karen Castrejón Trujillo	
Third	Kathia María Bolio Pinelo		Fifth	María Teresa Ochoa Mejía	
Third	Elías Lixa Abimerhi		Fifth	Rodrigo Samperio Chaparro	
Third	Karla González Cruz; Replacing Alma Rosa Hernández Escobar		Fifth	Catalina Díaz Vilchis	
Third	Pablo Angulo Briceño		Fifth	José Miguel De la Cruz Lima	
Third	Eufrosina Cruz Mendoza		Fifth	Noemí Salazar López	
Third	Carlos Miguel Aysa Damas		Fifth	Sergio Gutiérrez Luna	
Third	Lorena Piñón Rivera		Fifth	Yeidckol Polevnsky	
Third	Pablo Gamboa Miner		Fifth	Hirepan Maya Martínez	
Third	Mariana Nassar Piñeyro		Fifth	Celeste Ascencio Ortega	
Third	Pedro Armentía López		Fifth	Jaime Martínez López	
Third	Olga Luz Espinosa		Fifth	Alma Griselda Valencia Medina	
Third	Jesús Alberto Velázquez Flores; Replacing Rogelio Franco Castán		Fifth	Miguel Prado de los Santos	
Third	Maribel Martínez Ruiz		Fifth	Celestina Castillo Secundino	
Third	Francisco Amadeo Espinosa Ramos		Fifth	Martín Sandoval Soto	
Third	Valeria Santiago Barrientos		Fifth	Verónica Collado Crisolia	
Third	Juan Carlos Natale López		Fifth	Otoniel García Montiel	
Third	Janine Patricia Quijano Tapia		Fifth	Susana Cano González	
Third	Santy Montemayor Castillo		Fifth	Ángel Miguel Rodríguez Torres	
