= Global Coalition Against Systemic Racism and for Reparations =

The Global Coalition Against Systemic Racism and for Reparations is an international platform whose purpose is to promote actions that confront and eliminate systemic racism and advocate for reparations through collaboration among public, private, political, social, business, cultural, and productive entities, as well as international organizations.

It was launched during the first celebration of the International Day for People of African Descent on August 31, 2021, officially commemorated with the support of the Costa Rican government through the office of the Vice President Epsy Campbell Barr, and in collaboration with the United Nations Population Fund (UNFPA), the Office of the United Nations High Commissioner for Human Rights, and the United Nations System.

== Background ==
Systemic racism is a theoretical concept proposed by the sociologist Joe Feagin, asserting that racism is embedded within the structures and social relationships within society:

It is a system of domination and subjugation of one group over another based on the racialization of differences, encompassing interpersonal, institutional, and cultural dimensions. It is manifested through a set of ideas, discourses, and practices involving invisibility, stigmatization, discrimination, exclusion, exploitation, aggression, and dispossession.

Systemic racism can be defined as an infrastructure of decisions, ordinances, or statutes enacted by a sovereign government or authoritative entity. In this context, such ordinances and statutes grant specific rights and privileges to an ethnic group in a society, while denying other groups in that society the same rights and privileges due to ingrained cultural biases, religious prejudices, fears, myths, and xenophobia upheld by the privileged group.

Systemic racism elevates individuals of white race above other groups. This phenomenon impacts how the judicial system treats people belonging to the global majority and indigenous communities. Furthermore, it has repercussions in areas such as housing, education, healthcare, hiring processes, and various aspects of daily life. Although systemic racism is not always overt, in some cases, such as Jim Crow laws, it manifests clearly. It can even be unconscious, inadvertently contributing to the creation of inequalities.

In July 2021, the Vice President of Costa Rica, Epsy Campbell, announced to the United Nations General Assembly that the country would launch a Global Coalition Against Systemic Racism later that year. The initiative would receive support from various governments, civil society organizations, and the private sector. Its purpose would be to outline the path for reparations requested by the Office of the United Nations High Commissioner for Human Rights.

== Decalogue ==
The coalition established a decalogue of commitments that those interested in joining must accept and sign.

The first commitment involves promoting an anti-racist language that contributes to cultural change. Coalition members commit to eradicating, censoring, and condemning the use of racist language in various forms of communication, whether verbal, written, interpersonal, or official, as well as in advertising. Additionally, they actively commit to promoting the use of anti-racist language in all areas.

The second commitment focuses on the statistical visibility of people of African descent in censuses, surveys, and public records, recognizing that addressing systemic racism and addressing historical reparations for Afro-descendant peoples requires actions supported by statistical information.

The third commitment deals with creating discrimination-free and racism-free spaces in work organizations, prohibiting limitations, segregations, or exclusions based on the reasons provided for employment access, including selection criteria, training, professional promotion, compensation, working hours, and other work conditions.

The fourth commitment relates to affirmative actions for people of African descent in the territory and/or the organization. These actions seek to offset systemic conditions that discriminate or exclude socially disadvantaged groups, including the Afro-descendant population, and aim to reduce historical and structural gaps through affirmative quotas and other measures that promote the recognition and empowerment of these populations.

The fifth commitment involves promoting awareness activities about the anti-racist struggle and the recognition of Afro-descendant people, acknowledging the existence of gaps in well-being, recognition, autonomy, and the exercise of rights for indigenous and Afro-descendant peoples in Latin America. It also includes the promotion of international days, such as the International Day of Afro-descendants, to eliminate all forms of discrimination against this population.

The sixth commitment involves promoting the coalition alongside other allies and actors to boost the growth of the global anti-racist community, noting that the cause requires the participation of all social, political, economic, and civil society actors.

The seventh commitment states that coalition partners will take concrete actions to eradicate racism in the digital world. The eighth commitment implies that partners will support anti-racist actions promoted by the coalition, as well as initiatives from international bodies such as the Permanent Forum of Afro-descendants, the Committee for the Elimination of Racial Discrimination, among others. This includes the ratification of international conventions and treaties, as well as the request for expert reports on the situation of racism and discrimination.

The ninth commitment focuses on improving assistance to victims of racism and discrimination. This involves strengthening the capacity of victims to defend themselves against racist and discriminatory acts, implementing policies, protocols, or support programs, providing advice and guidance to report acts of discrimination, legal assistance, and dissemination of legal instruments. It also ensures access to mental health through personalized care, empowerment workshops, and reaffirmation of Afro-descendant identity.

The tenth commitment involves the periodic exchange of experiences and co-creation among coalition partners through regular meetings. Partner organizations commit to systematizing their experiences in implementing the commitments made to combat racism and discrimination.

== Actions ==
The Coalition has established two chapters in Mexico and Costa Rica, with plans to enable others in Colombia, Ecuador, the Dominican Republic, and Panama.

The Mexico chapter was inaugurated on November 28 and 29, 2022, at the Cultural Complex Los Pinos in Mexico City during the second edition of the "Global Forum against Racism and Discrimination: Path to a Rights-Based Post-COVID Recovery." It featured the participation of various organizations and Afro-Mexican parliamentarians such as Senator Marica Celeste López, Deputy Sergio Peñaloza Pérez, and former Deputy Teresa Mojica.

The Costa Rica chapter was installed on March 8 and 9, 2023, in the province of Limón, specifically in Cahuita. The installation included a march to proclaim Punta Cahuita as a "Site of Historical Memory" in the context of the project "Gateway to Reunification and Redemption between Africa and Its Diaspora." It also involved a dialogue between indigenous peoples and Afro-descendants, with representatives from local organizations, United Nations agencies, embassies, businesses, and civil society leaders being invited.

=== International Concerts Against Racism ===
The Coalition has organized two international concerts against racism to promote respect, justice, and recognition for Afro-descendant individuals. The first took place in Cahuita, Costa Rica, on March 8, 2023, in collaboration with the Afro-descendant Tribal Association of the South Caribbean; the Afro Women's Center; the Afro-descendant Institute for Study, Research, and Development; and the Cahuita Development Association, with the support of the United Nations Population Fund (UNFPA), the United Nations Educational, Scientific and Cultural Organization (UNESCO), and the office of the United Nations Resident Coordinator in Costa Rica. The event featured artists such as three-time Grammy nominee Rocky Dawuni, Mexican actor Tenoch Huerta, Puerto Rican four-time Grammy nominee William Cepeda, Costa Rican singer Sasha Campbell, and radio host Rose Davis.

The Second International Concert against Racism took place on July 29, 2023, as part of the Latinidades Festival held at Largo Quincas Berro D'Água in Salvador da Bahia, Brazil. The lineup included artists such as Panteras Negras, Slam das Minas Bahia, Rocky Dawuni, La Dame Blanche, Shirley Campbell Barr, Vox Sambou, and ENIO IXI.

=== Racism complaint against football coach ===
In March 2023, the Coalition, along with the Costa Rican Professional Players Association (ASOJUPRO) and the Afrodescendant Women's Center, reported that the coach of Deportivo Saprissa, Jeaustin Campos Madriz, made racist insults against player Javon Romario East during a training session. As a result, the team decided to remove him from his position. In November, the Ethics Committee of the Costa Rican Football Federation found Campos guilty of uttering racist insults against Eats, imposing a six-month ban on participating in football-related events and a $5000 fine. This marked the first time a head coach of a first-division club was sanctioned for such misconduct. Following the announcement of the penalty, Club Sport Herediano dismissed Campos from his position.
