= Imelda Sanmiguel Sánchez =

Mexican politician (born 1984)

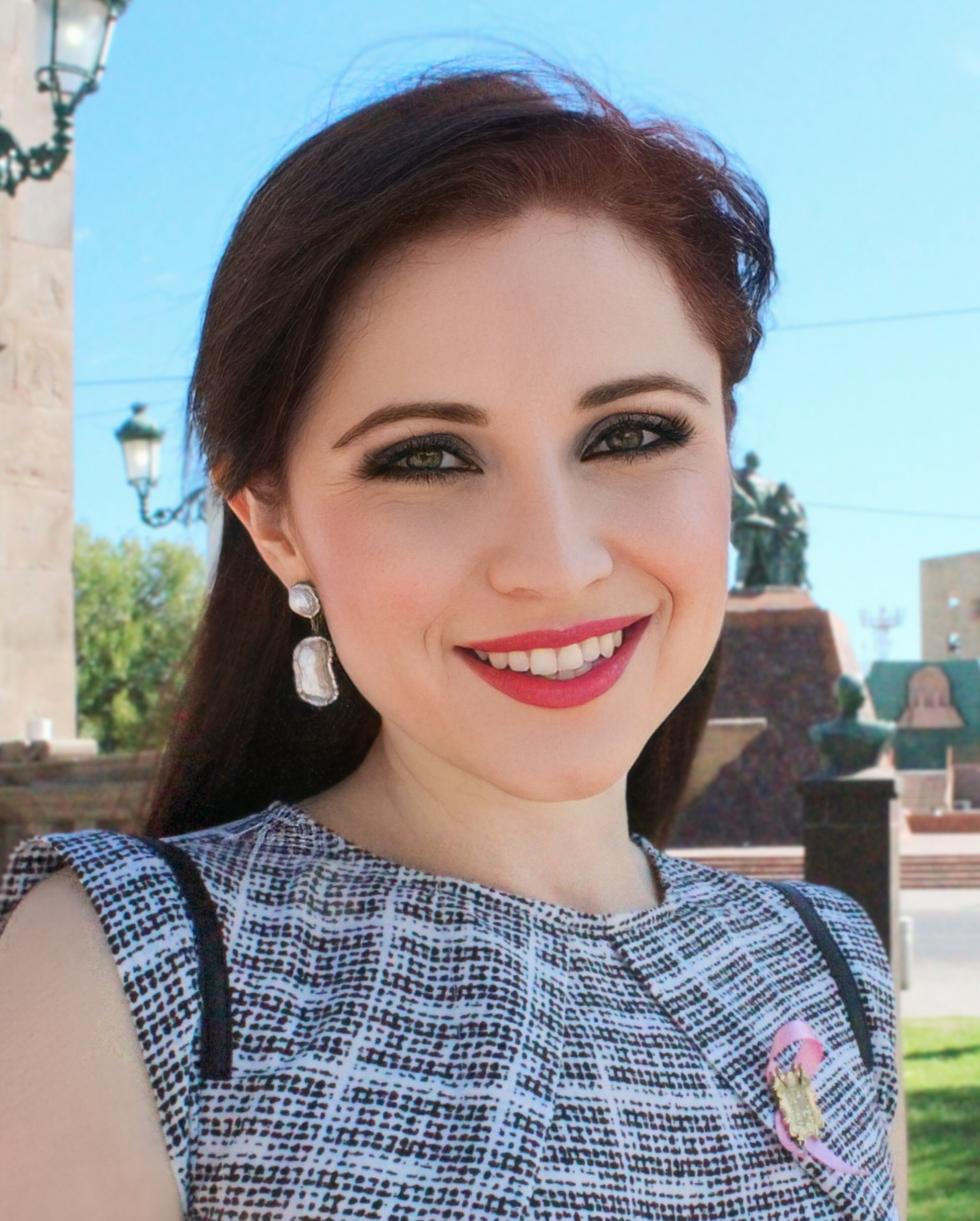
- Sanmiguel Sánchez in 2016

Member of the Senate of the Republic
- Incumbent
- Assumed office 1 September 2024
- Preceded by: Ismael García Cabeza de Vaca
- Constituency: Tamaulipas

Member of the Congress of Tamaulipas
- In office 1 October 2019 – 12 August 2022
- Preceded by: Brenda Georgina Cárdenas Thomae
- Succeeded by: Nora Gudelia Hinojosa García
- Constituency: 2nd district

Personal details
- Born: 31 March 1984 (age 42) Nuevo Laredo, Tamaulipas, Mexico
- Party: National Action Party
- Education: University of Monterrey (BArch); Autonomous University of Nuevo León

Imelda Margarita Sanmiguel Sánchez (Note: In this Spanish name, the first or paternal surname is Sanmiguel and the second or maternal family name is Sánchez.) (born 31 March 1984) is a Mexican politician from the National Action Party (PAN). She was elected to Tamaulipas's third Senate seat in the 2024 general election.

== Career ==
Imelda Sanmiguel Sánchez was born in Nuevo Laredo, Tamaulipas, on 31 March 1984. She holds a degree in architecture from the University of Monterrey (2007) and a master's in real-estate appraisals from the Autonomous University of Nuevo León (2011). A member of the National Action Party since 2003, she is the daughter of Arturo Sanmiguel Cantú, who took office as municipal president of Nuevo Laredo in 2021 and served in the Chamber of Deputies for Tamaulipas's 1st district during the 58th Congress (2000–2003).

From 2019 to 2024, she served two terms in the Congress of Tamaulipas.

She was the candidate of the PAN – in coalition with the Institutional Revolutionary Party (PRI) and the Party of the Democratic Revolution (PRD) – in the 2023 Tamaulipas special election, held on 19 February to elect a replacement senator following the death of Faustino López Vargas. With 22% of the vote in a three-way race, she lost to José Ramón Gómez Leal of the National Regeneration Movement (Morena).

Sanmiguel Sánchez contended again for one of Tamaulipas's Senate seats in the 2 June 2024 election, occupying the first position on the Fuerza y Corazón por México coalition's two-name formula alongside Arturo Fidel Núñez Ruiz. The coalition, in which the PAN again allied itself with the PRI and the PRD, placed second in the election, and she was duly elected to the state's third seat to serve during the 66th and 67th sessions of Congress.
