= Cházaro =

Cházaro is a surname. Notable people with the surname include:

- Luis Ángel Espinoza Cházaro, Mexican politician
- Miguel de Jesús Cházaro Basañez (1949–2023), Mexican botanist

== See also ==
- Francisco Lagos Cházaro, President of Mexico in 1915
