= Alejandro Gomez =

Alejandro Gomez may refer to:

== Arts and entertainment ==
- Alejandro Gómez Arias (1903–1990), Mexican journalist, first love of Frida Kahlo
- Alejandro Gómez Monteverde (born 1977), Mexican film director

== Politics and government ==
- Alejandro Gómez Maganda (1910–1984), Mexican politician, governor of Guerrero in 1951–1954
- Alejandro Gómez Olvera (born 1958), Mexican politician
- Alejandro Gómez (politician) (1908–2005), Argentine politician, vice president in 1958

== Sports ==
- Alejandro Gómez (Bolivian footballer) (born 1979), Bolivian football midfielder
- Alejandro Gómez (Mexican footballer) (born 2002), Mexican football centre-back
- Alejandro Gómez (runner) (born 1967), Spanish long-distance runner
- Alejandro Gomez Sigala (born 1960), Venezuelan equestrian
- Alejandro Gómez (swimmer) (born 1985), Venezuelan swimmer who competed at the 2007 and 2011 Pan American Games
- Alejandro Gómez (tennis) (born 1991), Colombian tennis player
- Papu Gómez (Alejandro Darío Gómez, born 1988), Argentine association forward
