= Diana Gutiérrez Valtierra =

Mexican politician (born 1991)

Federal deputy for Guanajuato's 7th
- Incumbent
- Assumed office 2024
- Preceded by: Michel González Márquez

Federal deputy for the 2nd region
- In office 2021–2024

Personal details
- Born: 11 March 1991; San Francisco del Rincón, Guanajuato, Mexico
- Political party: PAN

Diana Estefanía Gutiérrez Valtierra (Note: In this Spanish name, the first or paternal surname is Gutiérrez and the second or maternal family name is Valtierra.) (born 11 March 1991) is a Mexican politician from the National Action Party (PAN). In 2024, she began her second three-year term in the federal Chamber of Deputies.

== Biography ==
Diana Gutiérrez Valtierra was born in San Francisco del Rincón, Guanajuato, on 11 March 1991. She holds a bacherlor's degree in international business. From 2012 to 2021, she held various positions in the municipal government of León, Guanajuato, and in the Guanajuato state government under governors Miguel Márquez Márquez and Diego Sinhué Rodríguez Vallejo.

In the 2021 mid-term election, she contended for and won a plurinominal seat in the Chamber of Deputies, where she served for the duration of the 65th Congress (2021–2024), representing the 2nd electoral region. During her tenure, she proposed amending the tax legislation to exempt disposable nappies for both children and adults from value-added tax, arguing that they were not a luxury item and underscoring the ongoing rise in the number of older adults in the population.

Three years later, she was the PAN's candidate for a single-member seat in Guanajuato's 7th congressional district, centred on her home town of San Francisco del Rincón. In the general election held on 2 June 2024, she secured 59% of the vote in a three-way race and was duly elected to serve a second term in the lower house during the 66th Congress (2024–2027).
