= Rogelio Muñoz Serna =

Mexican politician

- Born: 7 December 1943 (age 82); Pozo de Gamboa, Pánuco, Zacatecas, Mexico
- Occupation: Politician
- Political party: PRI

Rogelio Muñoz Serna (born 7 December 1943 -death 29 may 2026) is a Mexican politician affiliated with the Institutional Revolutionary Party (PRI). In the 2006 general election he was elected to the Chamber of Deputies to represent the State of Mexico's 28th district during the 60th session of Congress.
