= 5th federal electoral district of San Luis Potosí =

Federal electoral district of Mexico

San Luis Potosí's 5th
- Electoral district of the Chamber of Deputies of Mexico

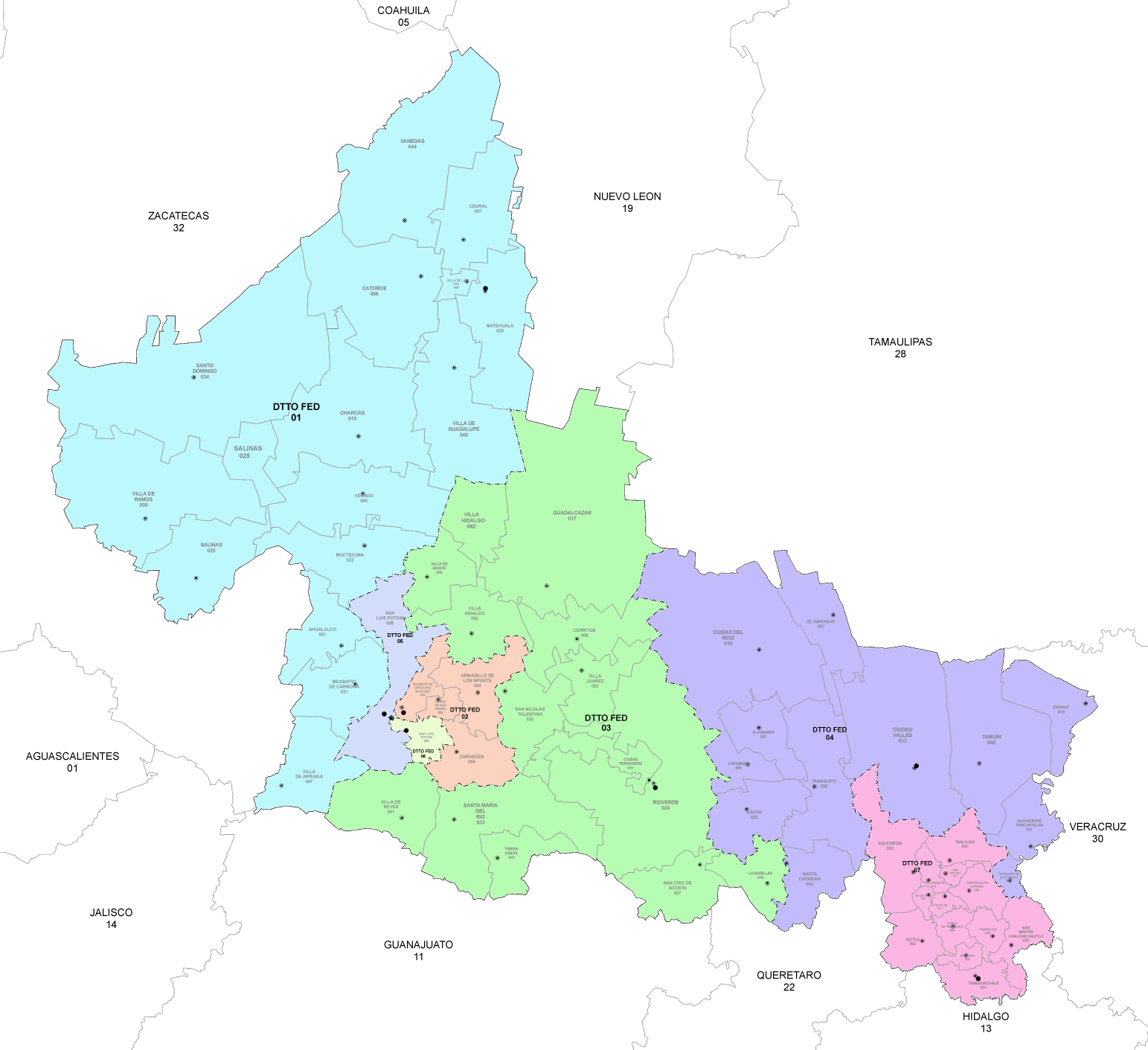
- 5th district since 2023

Incumbent
- Member: David Azuara Zúñiga
- Party: ▌National Action Party
- Congress: 66th (2024–2027)

District
- State: San Luis Potosí
- Head town: City of San Luis Potosí
- Coordinates: 22°10′N 101°00′W
- Covers: Municipality of San Luis Potosí (part)
- PR region: Second
- Precincts: 205
- Population: 457,904 (2020 census)

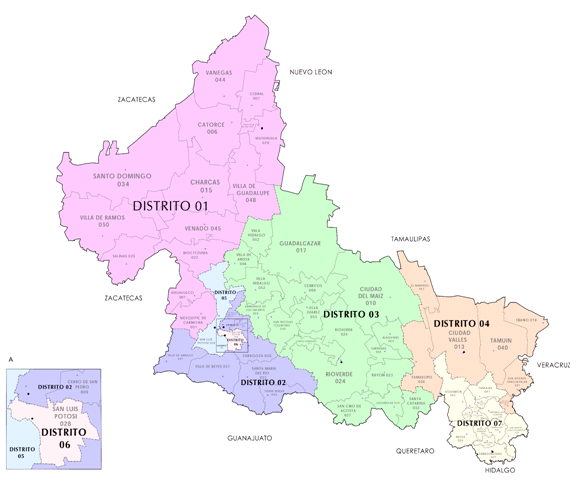
San Luis Potosí under the 2017–2022 scheme

The 5th federal electoral district of San Luis Potosí (Spanish: Distrito electoral federal 05 de San Luis Potosí) is one of the 300 electoral districts into which Mexico is divided for elections to the federal Chamber of Deputies and one of seven such districts in the state of San Luis Potosí.

It elects one deputy to the lower house of Congress for each three-year legislative session by means of the first-past-the-post system. Votes cast in the district also count towards the calculation of proportional representation ("plurinominal") deputies elected from the second region.

The current member for the district, elected in the 2024 general election, is David Azuara Zúñiga of the National Action Party (PAN).

== District territory ==
Under the 2023 districting plan adopted by the National Electoral Institute (INE), which is to be used for the 2024, 2027 and 2030 federal elections, the 5th district comprises 205 electoral precincts (secciones electorales) in the western portion of the municipality of San Luis Potosí. (Note: The 6th district covers the remainder of the municipality, including the city's urban core.)

The city of San Luis Potosí, the state capital, serves as the district's head town (cabecera distrital), where results from individual polling stations are gathered together and tallied. The district reported a population of 457,904 in the 2020 census.

== Previous districting schemes ==
Evolution of electoral district numbers
	1974	1978	1996	2005	2017	2023
San Luis Potosí	5	7	7	7	7	7
Chamber of Deputies	196	300				

2017–2022

Between 2017 and 2022, the district comprised 198 precincts in the western portion of the municipality of San Luis Potosí.

2005–2017

Under the 2005 districting plan, the district covered 198 precincts in the west of the municipality of San Luis Potosí.

1996–2005

From 1996 to 2005, the district covered the north of the municipality of San Luis Potosí, including the northern portion of the state capital.

1978–1996

The districting scheme in force from 1978 to 1996 was the result of the 1977 electoral reforms, which increased the number of single-member seats in the Chamber of Deputies from 196 to 300. Under that plan, San Luis Potosí's seat allocation rose from five to seven. The fifth district's head town was at Ciudad Valles and it covered the municipalities of Ciudad Valles, Ébano, San Antonio, San Vicente Tancuayalab, Tampamolón, Tamuín and Tanlajás in the east of the state.

== Deputies returned to Congress ==
(Mexico) National parties
- Current
- PAN
- PRI
- PT
- PVEM
- MC
- Morena
- PAZ
- Somos
- Defunct or local only
- PLM
- PNR
- PRM
- PNM
- PP
- PPS
- PARM
- PFCRN
- CON
- PANAL
- PSD
- PES
- PES
- PRD

San Luis Potosí's 5th district
Election	Deputy	Party	Term	Legislature
1916	Dionisio Zavala		1916–1917	Constituent Congress of Querétaro
...
1979	Bonifacio Fernández Padilla	Institutional Revolutionary Party	1979–1982	51st Congress
1982	Eusebio Ordaz Ortiz	Institutional Revolutionary Party	1982–1985	52nd Congress
1985	Alberto Magdaleno Mercado Araiza	Institutional Revolutionary Party	1985–1988	53rd Congress
1988	Fructuoso López Cárdenas	Institutional Revolutionary Party	1988–1991	54th Congress
1991	Antonio Esper Bujaidar	Institutional Revolutionary Party	1991–1994	55th Congress
1994	Fructuoso López Cárdenas	Institutional Revolutionary Party	1994–1997	56th Congress
1997	Javier Algara Cossío	National Action Party (Mexico)	1997–2000	57th Congress
2000	Beatriz Guadalupe Grande López	National Action Party (Mexico)	2000–2003	58th Congress
2003	Marco Antonio Gama Basarte	National Action Party (Mexico)	2003–2006	59th Congress
2006	Beatriz Eugenia García Reyes	National Action Party (Mexico)	2006–2009	60th Congress
2009	César Octavio Pedroza Gaitán	National Action Party (Mexico)	2009–2012	61st Congress
2012	Xavier Azuara Zúñiga	National Action Party (Mexico)	2012–2015	62nd Congress
2015	María de los Ángeles Rodríguez Aguirre	National Action Party (Mexico)	2015–2018	63rd Congress
2018	Josefina Salazar Báez	National Action Party (Mexico)	2018–2021	64th Congress
2021	José Antonio Zapata Meraz	National Action Party (Mexico)	2021–2024	65th Congress
2024	David Azuara Zúñiga	National Action Party (Mexico)	2024–2027	66th Congress

== Presidential elections ==
San Luis Potosí's 5th district
Election	District won by	Party or coalition	%
2018	Ricardo Anaya Cortés	Por México al Frente	37.4998
2024	Bertha Xóchitl Gálvez Ruiz	Fuerza y Corazón por México	46.1767
