= Cecilia Soledad Arévalo =

Mexican politician (born 1968)

- Born: 22 November 1968 (age 57); Purísima del Rincón, Guanajuato, Mexico
- Occupation: Politician
- Political party: PAN

Cecilia Soledad Arévalo Sosa (born 22 November 1968) is a Mexican politician from the National Action Party (PAN). In the 2009 mid-terms, she was elected to the Chamber of Deputies to represent Guanajuato's 7th district during the 61st session of Congress.
