= Rocío Abreu =

Mexican politician

Rocío Abreu Artiñano

Senator for Campeche
- Incumbent
- Assumed office 1 September 2018 Serving with A. Ostoa and C. Sánchez
- Preceded by: Jorge Luis Lavalle Maury

Deputy to the Congress of the Union from the 2nd district of Campeche
- In office 1 September 2012 – 31 August 2015
- Preceded by: Oscar Román Rosas
- Succeeded by: Rocío Matesanz Santamaría

Personal details
- Born: Rocío Adriana Abreu Artiñano; 29 May 1974 (age 52) Ciudad del Carmen, Campeche, Mexico
- Party: PANAL; MORENA
- Occupation: Senator

Rocío Adriana Abreu Artiñano (born 29 May 1974) is a Mexican politician. She serves as a senator in the LXIV Legislature of the Mexican Congress from the state of Campeche, currently caucusing with MORENA.

== Life ==
Abreu received a law degree from the Universidad Tecnológica de México and worked in the National Retirement Savings System Commission and the PGR. In 2003, she went into the private sector, working for three years at Megaproyectos del Sureste, S.A. de C.V.; she concurrently served as a councilor on the Campeche Human Rights Commission.

She was first elected to office in 2006, when she won a three-year term on the city council of Ciudad del Carmen under the Party of the Democratic Revolution banner despite losing the mayoral election. While in office, she filed a criminal complaint against mayor José Ignacio Seara Sierra for threats made against her in retribution for complaints about excessive spending by the mayor. Three years later, after changing parties to the New Alliance Party, she was elected to the Campeche state legislature, where she was the second-ranking official in the legislature and president of the Constitutional Points and Government Commissions. Once in the state legislature, she changed back to the PRI.

In 2012, voters in Ciudad del Carmen and Campeche's second federal electoral district elected Abreu to the LXII Legislature; though this was initially under the PVEM banner, she switched back to the PRI in September 2012. She presided over a special commission to investigate environmental damage caused by PEMEX operations. Between 2016 and 2018, she was the delegate of the Secretariat of Environment and Natural Resources (SEMARNAT) in the state of Campeche.

=== 2018 Senate election and party change ===
In 2018, Rocío Abreu ran as the female Senate candidate for the Todos por México political coalition. While the coalition had originally opted to give her second priority behind male candidate Christian Castro Bello, a court ruling from the TEPJF required the party to introduce gender parity across the country in terms of how many men and women led its Senate tickets, prompting the ticket to be reversed with Abreu on top. This turned out to be critical, as the PRI-PVEM-PANAL ticket came in second place, giving only Abreu a Senate seat and making her the only senator elected from the Nueva Alianza portion of the ticket nationwide. The election saw Nueva Alianza fail to keep its federal party registration, and as a result, Abreu and four alternate senators also elected from Nueva Alianza opted to join the National Regeneration Movement caucus in the Senate instead; as part of the deal, Abreu would be named president of a commission in the Senate, ultimately receiving the chairmanship of the Jurisdictional Commission.
