= María Guadalupe Velázquez Díaz =

Mexican politician (born 1985)

- Born: 29 April 1985 (age 41); Purísima del Rincón, Guanajuato, Mexico
- Occupation: Politician
- Political party: PRI

María Guadalupe Velázquez Díaz (born 29 April 1985) is a Mexican politician affiliated with the Institutional Revolutionary Party (PRI). In the 2012 general election, she was elected to the Chamber of Deputies to represent Guanajuato's 7th district during the 62nd session of Congress.
