= David Ferreyra Martínez =

Mexican politician

- Born: 20 September 1973 (age 52); Mexico City, Mexico
- Occupation: Politician
- Political party: PRD

David Ferreyra Martínez (born 20 September 1973) is a Mexican politician affiliated with the Party of the Democratic Revolution (PRD). In the 2003 mid-terms he was elected to the Chamber of Deputies to represent the State of Mexico's 28th district during the 59th session of Congress.
