= 2023 Tamaulipas special election =

By-election to the Senate of Mexico

2023 Tamaulipas special election (Senate of the Republic)
- 19 February 2023
- Turnout: 21.6962%
Candidate	José Ramón Gómez Leal	Imelda Margarita Sanmiguel Sánchez	Manuel Muñoz Cano
Party	MORENA	PAN	PVEM
Popular vote	429,988	130,496	23,764
Percentage	72.3570	21.9594	3.9989
Alternate	Indira Paola López Carreto	Georgina Barrios González	José Ricardo Espinoza Velázquez
Coalition	Juntos Hacemos Historia en Tamaulipas	Va por Tamaulipas	None

A special election was held in the Mexican state of Tamaulipas on 19 February 2023 to fill the state's vacant seat in the Senate of the Republic. It was won by José Ramón Gómez Leal of the National Regeneration Movement (Morena), who received over 72% of the votes cast in a three-way race.

== Background ==
Américo Villarreal Anaya of Morena was elected to Tamaulipas's first Senate seat in the 2018 general election but resigned his position to contend for the governorship of Tamaulipas in the 2022 election; he was replaced by his alternate, Faustino López Vargas, on 10 January 2022. Villarreal won the gubernatorial election held on 5 June and, except for a three-day period in September, did not return to his Senate seat.

López Vargas was killed in a traffic accident in Trancoso, Zacatecas, on 8 October 2022. The Senate declared the seat vacant and, in accordance with the Constitution, ordered a special election to cover the vacancy, to be held within a period of no more than three months. The National Electoral Institute (INE) resolved that the election would take place on 19 February 2023.

== Election ==
There were three contenders in the 19 February 2023 election:

- José Ramón Gómez Leal of the National Regeneration Movement (Morena), in the Juntos Hacemos Historia en Tamaulipas coalition with the Labour Party (PT), with Indira Paola López Carreto as his alternate.
- Imelda Margarita Sanmiguel Sánchez of the National Action Party (PAN), in the Va por Tamaulipas coalition with the Institutional Revolutionary Party (PRI) and the Party of the Democratic Revolution (PRD), with Georgina Barrios González as her alternate.
- Manuel Muñoz Cano of the Ecologist Green Party of Mexico (PVEM), who fought the election without coalition partners, with José Ricardo Espinoza Velázquez as his alternate.

With a low turnout – 21.70% of the 2,738,995 registered voters – election day was described by observers as slow. The count concluded the following day, and from the preliminary results it was clear that Gómez Leal had won the election. The result was confirmed by the INE on 22 February.

Candidate	Party	Votes	%
José Ramón Gómez Leal	MORENA–PT	429,988	73.60
Imelda Margarita Sanmiguel Sánchez	PAN–PRI–PRD	130,496	22.34
Manuel Muñoz Cano	PVEM	23,764	4.07
Total		584,248	100.00
Valid votes		584,248	98.32
Invalid/blank votes		10,011	1.68
Total votes		594,259	100.00
Registered voters/turnout		2,738,995	21.70
Source: National Electoral Institute; Candidate percentages indicate the proportion of valid votes cast rather than the total vote.

== Aftermath ==
Gómez Leal was sworn in as a senator on 7 March 2023. On 20 February 2024 he resigned his seat to seek re-election and was replaced by his alternate, López Carreto, for the remainder of the congressional session. In the 2 June 2024 Senate election, he was elected to Tamaulipas's second Senate seat, sharing Morena's two-person formula with Olga Patricia Sosa Ruiz. Sanmiguel Sánchez, his 2023 opponent, won the state's third seat.
