= Eduardo Murat Hinojosa =

Eduardo Enrique Murat Hinojosa (born August 29, 1980) is a Mexican politician, member of the Institutional Revolutionary Party (PRI). He has been a senator and is a federal deputy for the period from 2021 to 2024.

== Biography ==
He is the son of José Murat Casab, among various positions, Governor of Oaxaca from 1998 to 2004 and brother of Alejandro Murat Hinojosa, who was also Governor of Oaxaca from 2016 to 2022.

He has a law degree from the Instituto Tecnológico Autónomo de México, an MBA from Babson College and a Diploma in Political Marketing from George Washington University.

In 2018 he was registered as a candidate for alternate senator on the national list of the Green Ecologist Party of Mexico (PVEM), with the owner candidate being Manuel Velasco Coello, who at the time was serving as Governor of Chiapas. They were elected by said principle to the LXIV and LXV Legislatures from 2018 to 2024, for which Velasco — in a controversial process — requested a license from the Chiapas governorship on August 29, protested as a senator on September 1 and requested a license for said position the following day, with the intention of becoming governor again; Given what parties opposed to Velasco considered a political excess, in a first vote they denied his license request, however, on the same day and in a second vote, it was finally granted. Before which, on September 6, Eduardo Murat protested as senator in substitution of Velasco, assuming the positions of president of the Environment, Natural Resources and Climate Change commission; and as a member of the Administration Commissions; Science and Technology; and, of Justice. Almost a year later, on September 3, 2019, Eduardo Murat in turn requested a license from the Senate, which allowed the reinstatement of Manuel Velasco Coello.

In 2021 he was elected federal deputy by multinominal route, postulated by the PRI, to the LXV Legislature that will end in 2024. In it he is secretary of the Foreign Relations commission; and member of the commissions; of Science, Technology and Innovation; and Environment and Natural Resources.
