= Jaime Verdín Saldaña =

Mexican politician (born 1962)

- Born: 26 July 1962 (age 63); Guanajuato, Mexico
- Occupation: Politician
- Political party: PAN

Jaime Verdín Saldaña (born 26 July 1962) is a Mexican politician affiliated with the National Action Party (PAN). In the 2006 general election, he was elected to the Chamber of Deputies to represent Guanajuato's 7th district during the 60th session of Congress.
