= Nadia Navarro Acevedo =

Mexican politician

Plurinominal member of the Chamber of Deputies
- Incumbent
- Assumed office 1 September 2024

Senator of the Congress of the Union from Puebla First Minority
- In office 1 September 2018 – 31 August 2024
- Preceded by: Javier Lozano Alarcón

Personal details
- Born: 14 November 1977 (age 48) Acatlán de Osorio, Puebla, Mexico
- Party: PRI (since 2023)
- Other political affiliations: PAN (until 2023)
- Occupation: Politician

Nadia Navarro Acevedo (born 14 November 1977) is a Mexican politician from the Institutional Revolutionary Party (PRI) who previously belonged to the National Action Party (PAN). From 2018 to 2024, she served as a senator for the state of Puebla and, in the 2024 general election, she was elected to a plurinominal seat in the Chamber of Deputies.

== Early years ==
Navarro studied a law degree at the Escuela Libre de Derecho of Puebla and a master's degree in constitutional law and protection. From 2002 to 2004, she worked as a lawyer for the Mexican Social Security Institute (IMSS). From 2005 to 2007, she worked as a lawyer in the defense department of the Comptroller's Office of the municipality of Puebla de Zaragoza.

== Political career ==
In 2014, Navarro was appointed as councilor of the municipality of Puebla de Zaragoza on behalf of the Social Pact of Integration party. In January 2017, she requested leave of absence from the position to join the team of Governor José Antonio Gali Fayad as head of the Women's Institute of Puebla.

In the 2018 federal elections, Navarro was elected as the first minority senator of the National Action Party. From 1 September 2018 to 31 August 2024, she was a senator representing the state of Puebla in the 64th and 65th sessions of the Congress of the Union. Within the Senate, she served as secretary of the Governance Commission and the bicameral Commission of the Congressional Channel.

While in office, she joined the Madrid Forum, an alliance organized by the Spanish party Vox, which comprises right-wing and far-right individuals.

On 14 December 2023, she left the National Action Party to join the Institutional Revolutionary Party. Additionally, she announced her interest in seeking re-election as a senator with the support of her new party. Ultimately, she instead contended for and won one of the PRI's plurinominal seats in the Chamber of Deputies.
