= Beatriz Grande López =

Mexican politician

- Born: 23 December 1955 (age 70); San Luis Potosí, Mexico
- Occupation: Politician
- Political party: PAN

Beatriz Guadalupe Grande López (born 23 December 1955) is a Mexican politician from the National Action Party (PAN). In the 2000 general election she was elected to the Chamber of Deputies to represent San Luis Potosí's 5th district during the 58th session of Congress.
