= Jorge Luis Lavalle Maury =

Mexican politician

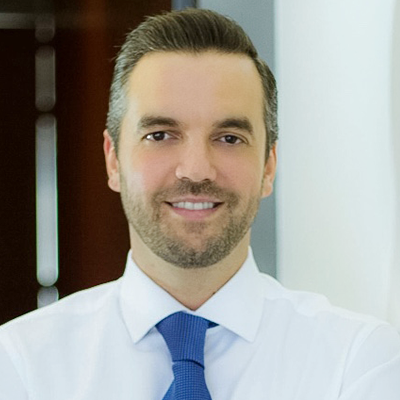

Senator for Campeche
- In office 1 September 2012 – 31 August 2018
- Preceded by: Sebastián Calderón Centeno
- Succeeded by: Rocío Abreu Artiñano

Personal details
- Born: 16 July 1975 (age 50) Campeche, Campeche, Mexico
- Party: PAN
- Occupation: Senator

Jorge Luis Lavalle Maury (born July 16, 1975 in Campeche City, Campeche) is a Mexican politician formerly affiliated with the National Action Party. From September 2012 to September 2018, Lavalle served as first minority senator representing the state of Campeche in the Mexican senate.

Lavalle presided over the First Committee of the Interior, Constitutional Points and Justice, and was formerly secretary of the Commission of Finance and Public Credit Secretary Administration Commission, and a member of the Committees on Communications and Transport Energy.

== Early life and education ==
Lavalle graduated from the Monterrey Institute of Technology and Higher Education with a degree in accounting in 1998. He has a degree in Finance from the University of Lincoln, and a Master in Senior Management and International Business at the Universidad del Mayab.

== Career ==
It has been developed in the private sector as a certified SAP consultant, Vice President of Finance Karims Group Consulting and Executive Vice President John Broderick-Mac. Director of Productive Opportunities for Secretary of Social Development Program in Campeche.

In the 2012 Mexican general election, Lavalle won a position as first minority senator from Campeche. His term began September 1, 2012.

Senator Lavalle was one of the main drivers of energy reform are the main spokesman for the opposition party to participate actively in shaping reform.

He was President of the Association of Maquiladoras of Campeche, President of the Commission of Young Entrepreneurs of the Coparmex (Campeche) and Deputy Chairman of the National Committee of Young Entrepreneurs Coparmex (South-East).

Also he helped the Ministry of Social Development (SEDESOL), as Director General of Productive Options Program.

He has taught finance at Inter American University for Development.

He has served as executive vice president Karims Consultant Group and executive vice president of the consulting-Mac JOHN Broderick. .

Along with Ernesto Cordero and Eufrosina Cruz, Lavalle was expelled from the National Action Party on June 30, 2018. He was succeeded as senator from Campeche by Rocío Abreu Artiñano.
