= Beatriz Eugenia García Reyes =

Mexican politician

- Born: 3 January 1949 (age 77); San Luis Potosí, San Luis Potosí, Mexico
- Occupation: Politician
- Political party: PAN

Beatriz Eugenia García Reyes (born 3 January 1949) is a Mexican politician from the National Action Party (PAN). In the 2006 general election she was elected to the Chamber of Deputies to represent San Luis Potosí's 5th district during the 60th session of Congress.
