= José Ramón Gómez Leal =

Mexican politician (born 1977)

Senator of the Congress of the Union for Tamaulipas
- Incumbent
- Assumed office 19 February 2023 Serving with Ma. Guadalupe Covarrubias Cervantes and Ismael García Cabeza de Vaca
- Preceded by: Faustino López Vargas

Personal details
- Born: 7 July 1977 (age 48) Reynosa, Tamaulipas, Mexico
- Party: Morena
- Other political affiliations: PAN
- Education: Saint Mary's University
- Occupation: Politician

José Ramón Gómez Leal (born 7 July 1977) is a Mexican politician affiliated with the National Regeneration Movement party (Morena). He was a local deputy of the Congress of Tamaulipas from 2010 to 2013 for the National Action Party (PAN) and Delegate for Development Programs in the state of Tamaulipas from 2018 to 2021. In a 2023 special election he was elected as Senator of the Republic for the 65th session of the Congress of the Union, and he was re-elected to the Senate for Tamaulipas in the general election the following year.

== Early years ==
José Ramón Gómez Leal was born in Reynosa, Tamaulipas, on 7 July 1977. He studied high school at the Monterrey Institute of Technology and Higher Education and graduated from Saint Mary's University in San Antonio, Texas.

== Political career ==
From 2008 to 2010 he was councilor of the municipality of Reynosa for the National Action Party, during the municipal presidency of Oscar Luebbert Gutiérrez. In the 2010 state elections, he was elected deputy for proportional representation of the Congress of Tamaulipas, representing the National Action Party. He held the seat in the state congresss from 1 January 2011 to 30 September 2013. In Congress, he was president of the communications and transportation commission, and secretary of the education commission.

In 2013 José Ramón Gómez Leal requested the candidacy of his party for the Reynosa city council. The party's internal election determined that the nomination would go to Jesús María Moreno Ibarra. However, Gómez Leal contested the process and after a recount of the votes he was granted the candidacy of the National Action Party for the 2013 elections. In the elections held on July 7, José Ramón Gómez Leal came in second place, with 31% of the votes in his favor, being surpassed by the candidate of the Institutional Revolutionary Party, José Elías Leal.

In 2018, he joined the National Regeneration Movement party and was appointed Delegate of Development Programs in the State of Tamaulipas. In September 2021, he announced his resignation from office to seek his party's candidacy for governor of Tamaulipas in the 2022 elections.

In December 2022, he was nominated as senator for the state of Tamaulipas by Juntos Haremos Historia coalition, made up of the National Regeneration Movement party and the Labor Party. The February 2023 special election was held after a seat was left vacant in the Senate following the resignation of Américo Villarreal Anaya to serve as governor of Tamaulipas and the death of his alternate, Faustino López Vargas, in October 2022 in a car accident. In the elections Gómez Leal was elected senator of the republic with about 71% of the votes in his favor, although the elections also had an abstention rate close to 80%.

Gómez Leal won re-election as one of Tamaulipas's senators in the 2024 Senate election, occupying the second place on the National Regeneration Movement's two-name formula.
