= 7th federal electoral district of Guanajuato =

Federal electoral district of Mexico

Guanajuato's 7th
- Electoral district of the Chamber of Deputies of Mexico

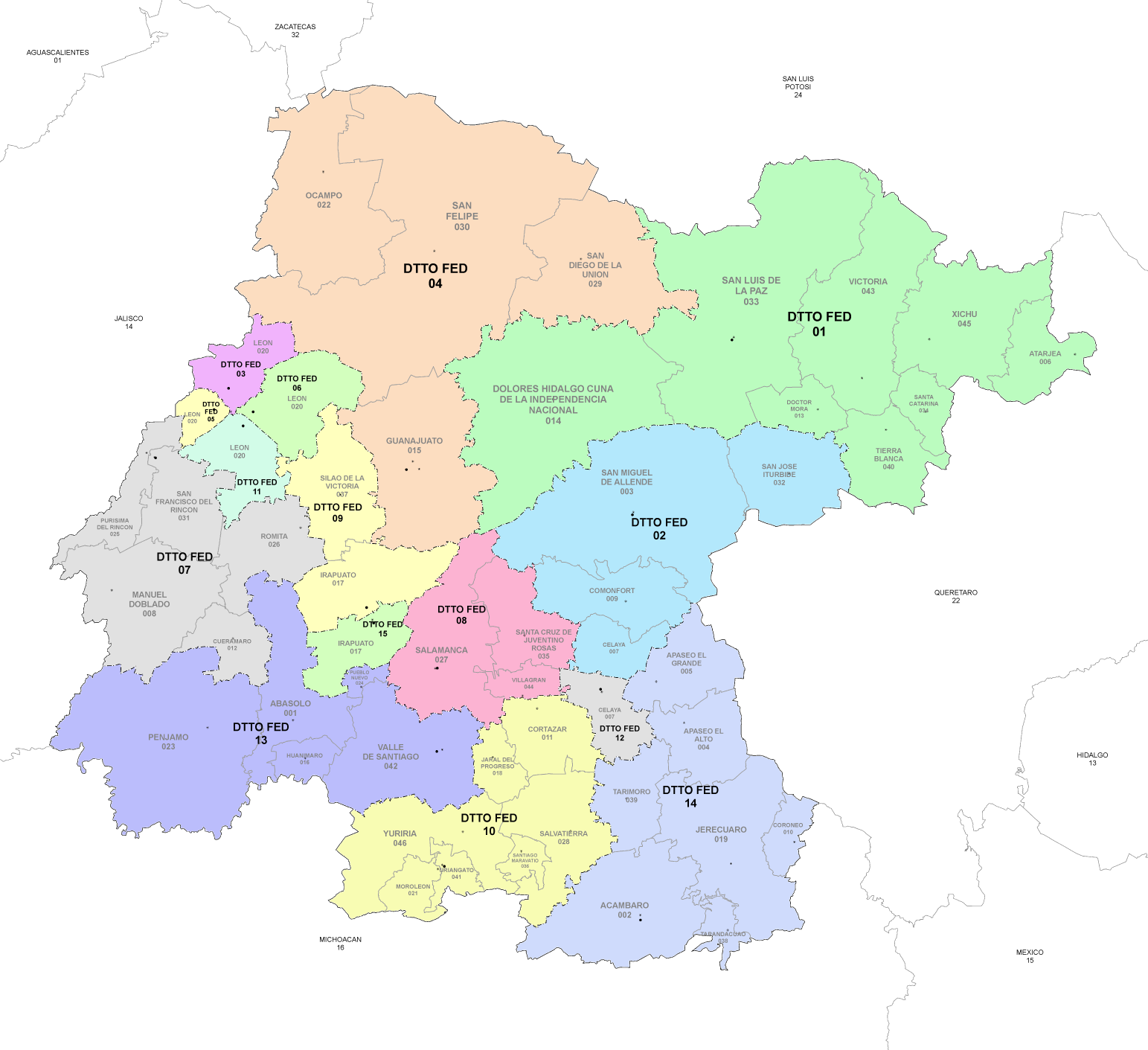
- 7th district since 2023

Incumbent
- Member: Diana Gutiérrez Valtierra
- Party: ▌National Action Party
- Congress: 66th (2024–2027)

District
- State: Guanajuato
- Head town: San Francisco del Rincón
- Coordinates: 21°01′N 101°51′W
- Covers: 5 municipalities: Manuel Doblado, Cuerámaro, Purísima del Rincón, Romita, San Francisco del Rincón
- PR region: Second
- Precincts: 197
- Population: 352,989 (2020 census)

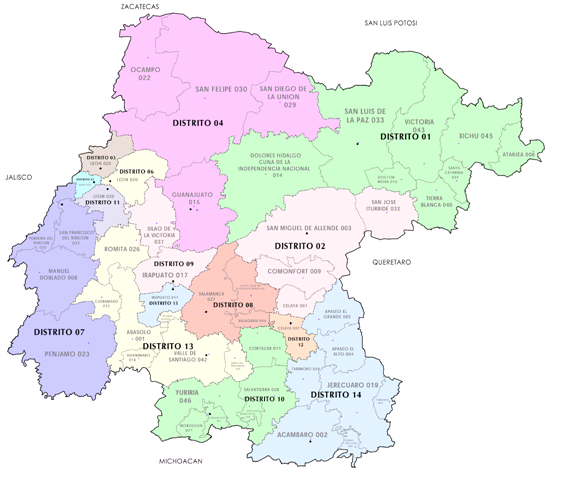
Guanajuato's districts in 2017–2022

The 7th federal electoral district of Guanajuato (Spanish: Distrito electoral federal 07 de Guanajuato) is one of the 300 electoral districts into which Mexico is divided for elections to the federal Chamber of Deputies and one of 15 such districts in the state of Guanajuato.

It elects one deputy to the lower house of Congress for each three-year legislative session by means of the first-past-the-post system. Votes cast in the district also count towards the calculation of proportional representation ("plurinominal") deputies elected from the second region.

The current member for the district, elected in the 2024 general election, is Diana Estefanía Gutiérrez Valtierra of the National Action Party (PAN).

== District territory ==
Under the 2023 districting plan adopted by the National Electoral Institute (INE), which is to be used for the 2024, 2027 and 2030 federal elections, the 7th district is on Guanajuato's western border with Jalisco and comprises 197 electoral precincts (secciones electorales) across five of the state's 46 municipalities:

- Manuel Doblado, Cuerámaro, Purísima del Rincón, Romita and San Francisco del Rincón

The head town (cabecera distrital), where results from individual polling stations are gathered together and tallied, is the city of San Francisco del Rincón. The district reported a population of 352,989 in the 2020 census.

== Previous districting schemes ==
Evolution of electoral district numbers
	1974	1978	1996	2005	2017	2023
Guanajuato	9	13	15	14	15	15
Chamber of Deputies	196	300				

2017–2022

Between 2017 and 2022, the 7th district's head town was at San Francisco del Rincón and it covered four municipalities in the west of the state:
- Manuel Doblado, Purísima del Rincón, San Francisco del Rincón (as in the 2023 plan), plus Pénjamo.

2005–2017

Under the 2005 plan, Guanajuato had only 14 districts. This district's head town was at San Francisco del Rincón and it covered four municipalities:
- Purísima del Rincón, San Francisco del Rincón and Pénjamo (as in the 2017 plan), plus Silao.

1996–2005

In the 1996 scheme, under which Guanajuato was assigned 15 seats, the district had its head town at San Francisco del Rincón and it comprised five municipalities:
- Manuel Doblado, Cuerámaro, Purísima del Rincón, Romita and San Francisco del Rincón.

1978–1996

The districting scheme in force from 1978 to 1996 was the result of the 1977 electoral reforms, which increased the number of single-member seats in the Chamber of Deputies from 196 to 300. Under that plan, Guanajuato's seat allocation rose from 9 to 13. The 7th district comprised the municipalities of Acámbaro (which served as the head town), Apaseo el Alto, Apaseo el Grande, Coroneo, Jerécuaro and Tarandacuao.

== Deputies returned to Congress ==
(Mexico) National parties
- Current
- PAN
- PRI
- PT
- PVEM
- MC
- Morena
- PAZ
- Somos
- Defunct or local only
- PLM
- PNR
- PRM
- PNM
- PP
- PPS
- PARM
- PFCRN
- CON
- PANAL
- PSD
- PES
- PES
- PRD

Guanajuato's 7th district
Election	Deputy	Party	Term	Legislature
1916	Antonio Madrazo		1916–1917	Constituent Congress of Querétaro
...
1976	Enrique León Hernández	Institutional Revolutionary Party	1976–1979	50th Congress
1979	Ignacio Vázquez Torres	Institutional Revolutionary Party	1979–1982	51st Congress
1982	Álvaro Uribe Salas	Institutional Revolutionary Party	1982–1985	52nd Congress
1985	Arturo Ruiz Morales	Institutional Revolutionary Party	1985–1988	53rd Congress
1988	Álvaro Uribe Salas	Institutional Revolutionary Party	1988–1991	54th Congress
1991	Rafael Sánchez Leyva	Institutional Revolutionary Party	1991–1994	55th Congress
1994	Luis Manuel Jiménez Lemus	Institutional Revolutionary Party	1994–1997	56th Congress
1997	José García Cerda	National Action Party (Mexico)	1997–2000	57th Congress
2000	Juan Carlos Sáinz Lozano	National Action Party (Mexico)	2000–2003	58th Congress
2003	Juan Manuel Dávalos Padilla	Institutional Revolutionary Party	2003–2006	59th Congress
2006	Jaime Verdín Saldaña	National Action Party (Mexico)	2006–2009	60th Congress
2009	Cecilia Soledad Arévalo Sosa	National Action Party (Mexico)	2009–2012	61st Congress
2012	María Guadalupe Velázquez Díaz	Institutional Revolutionary Party	2012–2015	62nd Congress
2015	Ricardo Ramírez Nieto	Institutional Revolutionary Party	2015–2018	63rd Congress
2018	Karen Michel González Márquez	National Action Party (Mexico)	2018–2021	64th Congress
2021	Karen Michel González Márquez	National Action Party (Mexico)	2021–2024	65th Congress
2024	Diana Estefanía Gutiérrez Valtierra	National Action Party (Mexico)	2024–2027	66th Congress

== Presidential elections ==
Guanajuato's 7th district
Election	District won by	Party or coalition	%
2018	Ricardo Anaya Cortés	Por México al Frente	40.8341
2024	Bertha Xóchitl Gálvez Ruiz	Fuerza y Corazón por México	49.6784
