= Juan Manuel Dávalos Padilla =

Mexican politician

- Born: 30 April 1953 (age 73); San Miguel el Alto, Jalisco, Mexico
- Occupation: Politician
- Political party: PRI

Juan Manuel Dávalos Padilla (born 30 April 1953) is a Mexican politician affiliated with the Institutional Revolutionary Party (PRI). In the 2003 mid-terms, he was elected to the Chamber of Deputies to represent Guanajuato's 7th district during the 59th session of Congress. He previously served as the municipal president of San Francisco del Rincón.
