= Octavio Germán Olivares =

Mexican politician (born 1962)

- Born: Sergio Octavio Germán Olivares; 22 March 1962 (age 64); Federal District, Mexico
- Education: Bachelor's Degree in Business Administration
- Occupation: Politician
- Political party: PAN

Sergio Octavio Germán Olivares (born 22 March 1962) is a Mexican politician from the National Action Party (PAN). In the 2009 mid-terms he was elected to the Chamber of Deputies to represent the State of Mexico's 28th district during the 61st session of Congress.
