= Cecilia Sánchez García =

Mexican politician

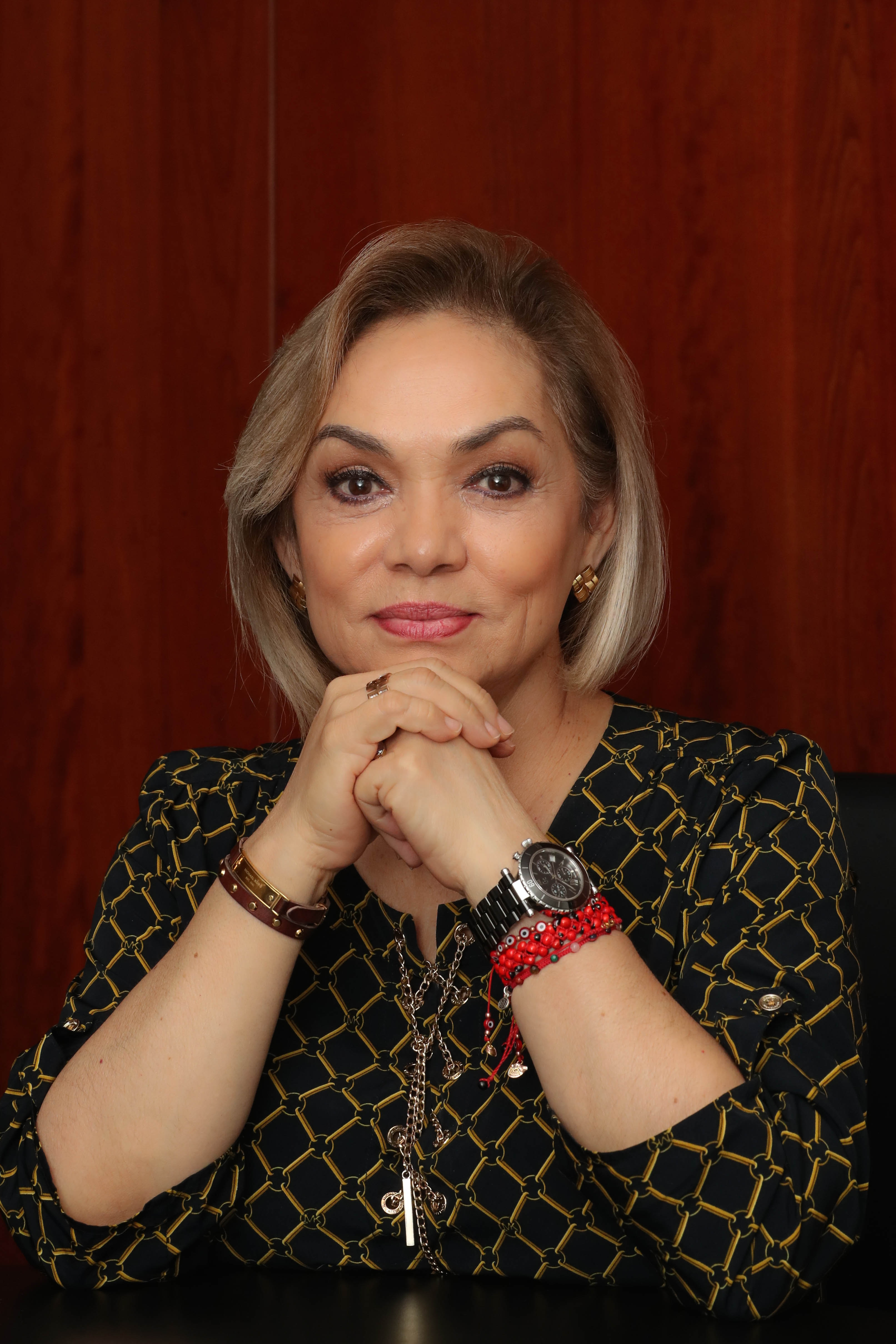

Senator of the Congress of the Union for Campeche
- Incumbent
- Assumed office September 1, 2018 Serving with Aníbal Ostoa Ortega and Rocío Abreu
- Preceded by: Óscar Román Rosas González

Personal details
- Born: Cecilia Margarita Sánchez García; November 23, 1959 (age 66) Torreón, Coahuila, Mexico
- Party: PRI (since 2023); Morena (until 2023)

Cecilia Margarita Sánchez García (born November 23, 1959) is a Mexican politician affiliated with the Institutional Revolutionary Party and previously with the National Regeneration Movement. Since September 1, 2018, she has been a senator of the republic in the LXIV Legislature of the Congress of the Union representing the state of Campeche.

== Early years ==
Cecilia Margarita Sánchez García was born on November 23, 1959, in the state of Coahuila, Mexico. She has worked for the parastatal company Petróleos Mexicanos (PEMEX) in the San Martín Texmelucan refinery, Puebla, and in the subdirectorate of the oil company's hospital in Tula, Hidalgo. She served as secretary of the interior in section 47 of the Petroleum Workers Union of the Mexican Republic (STPRM) from June 2006 to August 2010 and as secretary of labor from January 2013 to December 2015.

== Senator of the Republic ==
In the 2018 federal elections, she was nominated by the National Regeneration Movement party as a second-party senator for the state of Campeche. Since September 1, 2018, she has been a senator of the republic in the LXIV Legislature of the Congress of the Union. Within the Senate, she holds the position of secretary of the tourism commission.

On October 25, 2023, Sánchez left Morena and joined the PRI.

== Controversies ==
Sánchez has been accused of having received her salary at Pemex without having attended work for 11 years, from 2006 to 2017, including the period in which she held management positions within section 47 of the oil union. Behaviors within the parastatal company that she herself has criticized to other members of the union.

In October 2018 she was reprimanded at a rally by Andrés Manuel López Obrador, at the time president-elect of Mexico, for her intention to be leader of the oil workers' union in section 47, while also holding a seat in the senate, declaring that "what you are doing is not done, as a civil servant your obligation is to be in the senate and not to go looking for other positions".
