= Conservatorio de Castella =

Arts institute in Heredia, Costa Rica

Coordinates: 9°58′02″N 84°08′13″W

The Conservatorio de Castella (Castella Conservatory) is an arts institute located on the Pan American Highway, in Heredia, Costa Rica. In 2016 the school was honored by a Declaratoria de Benemérito de la Patria, (Declaration of Merit of the Homeland), which recognized the historical distinction of the school, and also provided for campuses of the school to be established in each of the seven provinces in Costa Rica.

== History ==
In 1943, Carlos Millet de Castella died and left a legacy of ₡100,000 and a plot of land to create a Conservatory of Music in San José named in honor of his mother, Elena de Castella Canillo. He specified that the governing board was to have members named by the Secretariat of Public Education, the Cultural Association of Musicians, the Association of Artists and Writers, and the National Insurance Bank. In 1947, the Asociación Conservatorio de Castella (Castella Conservatory Association) was created and the property and funds were transferred by the courts to the association. Arnoldo Herrera González, the director of the National Symphony Orchestra, was appointed to run the school in 1950 by the Ministry of Education. On 25 November 1953, the first facilities for the conservatory were completed and were inaugurated in a ceremony attended by President José Figueres; the archbishop of San José, Rubén Odio; the Minister of Education, Uladislao Gámez; and Herrera.

Having been raised in an era when artists were not supported nor well-regarded by society, Herrera wanted to create an institution which would promote art and artists from every social class. The pedagogical model used by Herrera was one which combined academic, artistic and scientific education to develop students with a life-long passion and critical sense of life, social responsibility and happiness. Inspired by the Montessori method, Herrera believed "El secreto de la educación reside en la libertad. Si hay libertad, hay creatividad, y si hay creatividad, hay trascendencia". (The secret of education lies in freedom. If there is freedom, there is creativity, and if there is creativity, there is transcendence).

The first classes were held in 1954, in the building which is now the Teatro Arnoldo Herrera. Students received academic training in the morning and after lunch received interdisciplinary artistic training, which might include dance, painting, music, or folkloric study. A new campus was built and the school moved to Barreal de Heredia, in the Ulloa canton, in 1974.

== Current school ==
The Conservatory is now a public institution which promotes artistic development along with formal education designated by the Ministry of Public Education for primary and secondary students. The primary artistic studies available include courses in architecture, dance, folklore, literature, music, painting, sculpture, theater, and audio-visual arts.

== Notable alumni ==
- Marvin Camacho Villegas, winner of the Premio Nacional Aquileo J. Echeverría for composing in 2013.
- Shirley Campbell Barr, Afro-Costa Rican activist, anthropologist, and poet.
- Hazel González Araya, director of dance at the University of Costa Rica.
- Aquiles Jiménez Arias, sculptor.
- Elián López Jaén, winner of the Best Dance Performance award in the National Culture Awards of 2011.
- Iván Rodríguez, violinist and Deputy Minister of Culture and Youth
- Juan Carlos Soto, musician and luthier.
- Jorge Jiménez Deredia
- Johanna Solano, Miss Costa Rica 2011, Miss Universe Top 10
