= 41st federal electoral district of the State of Mexico =

Federal electoral district of Mexico

Coordinates: 19°41′N 99°00′W

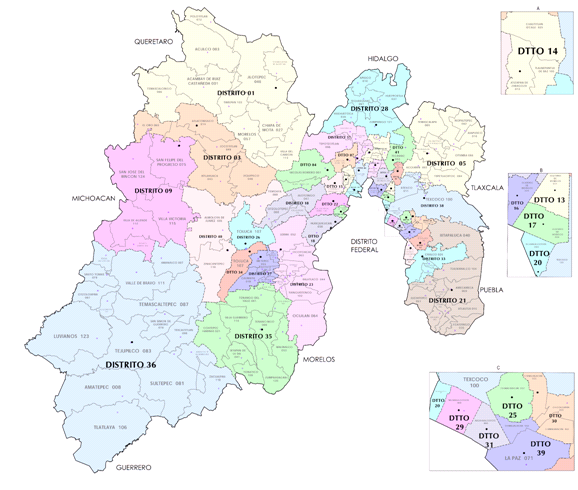
The State of Mexico under the 2017–2022 districting plan. The 41st, shaded green, is in the north-east of the state.

The 41st federal electoral district of the State of Mexico (Spanish: Distrito electoral federal 41 del Estado de México) is a defunct federal electoral district of Mexico.

During its existence it elected one deputy to the Chamber of Deputies for each three-year legislative session by means of the first-past-the-post system. Votes cast in the district also counted towards the calculation of proportional representation ("plurinominal") deputies elected from the fifth region.

The 41st district was created by the National Electoral Institute (INE) in its 2017 redistricting process and dissolved on account of shifting demographics in 2023. Accordingly, it elected its first deputy in the 2018 general election and its last in the 2021 mid-terms.

== District territory ==
During its existence, the 41st district comprised 157 electoral precincts (secciones electorales) and covered the municipality of Tecámac in its entirety. The head town (cabecera distrital), where results from individual polling stations were gathered together and tallied, was the city of Ojo de Agua.

The 2023 districting plan split Tecámac between the 5th and 20th districts.

== Deputies returned to Congress ==
(Mexico) National parties
- Current
- PAN
- PRI
- PT
- PVEM
- MC
- Morena
- PAZ
- Somos
- Defunct or local only
- PLM
- PNR
- PRM
- PNM
- PP
- PPS
- PARM
- PFCRN
- CON
- PANAL
- PSD
- PES
- PES
- PRD

State of Mexico's 41st district
Election	Deputy	Party	Term	Legislature
2018	Nancy Claudia Reséndiz Hernández	Social Encounter Party	2018–2021	64th Congress
2021	Sue Ellen Bernal Bolnik	Institutional Revolutionary Party	2021–2024	65th Congress

== Presidential elections ==
State of Mexico's 41st district
Election	District won by	Party or coalition	%
2018	Andrés Manuel López Obrador	Juntos Haremos Historia	55.9710
