= Aníbal Ostoa Ortega =

Mexican politician

Senator of the Congress of the Union from Campeche
- Incumbent
- Assumed office 1 September 2018 Serving with Cecilia Margarita Sánchez García and Rocío Abreu Artiñano
- Preceded by: Raúl Aarón Pozos

Deputy to the Congress of the Union from the third region
- In office 4 February 2009 – 31 August 2009

Personal details
- Born: 10 May 1949 (age 77) Campeche, Mexico
- Party: MORENA
- Education: UNAM
- Occupation: Politician

Aníbal Ostoa Ortega (born 10 May 1949) is a Mexican politician currently affiliated with National Regeneration Movement (Morena).

He served as a senator for the state of Campeche in the 64th session of Congress. In 2009 he served as a federal deputy in the final six months of the 60th congressional session, taking the place of Deputy Layda Elena Sansores San Román.

Ostoa Ortega won re-election as one of Campeche's senators in the 2024 Senate election, occupying the second place on the Sigamos Haciendo Historia coalition's two-name formula.
