= Sue Ellen Bernal =

Mexican politician

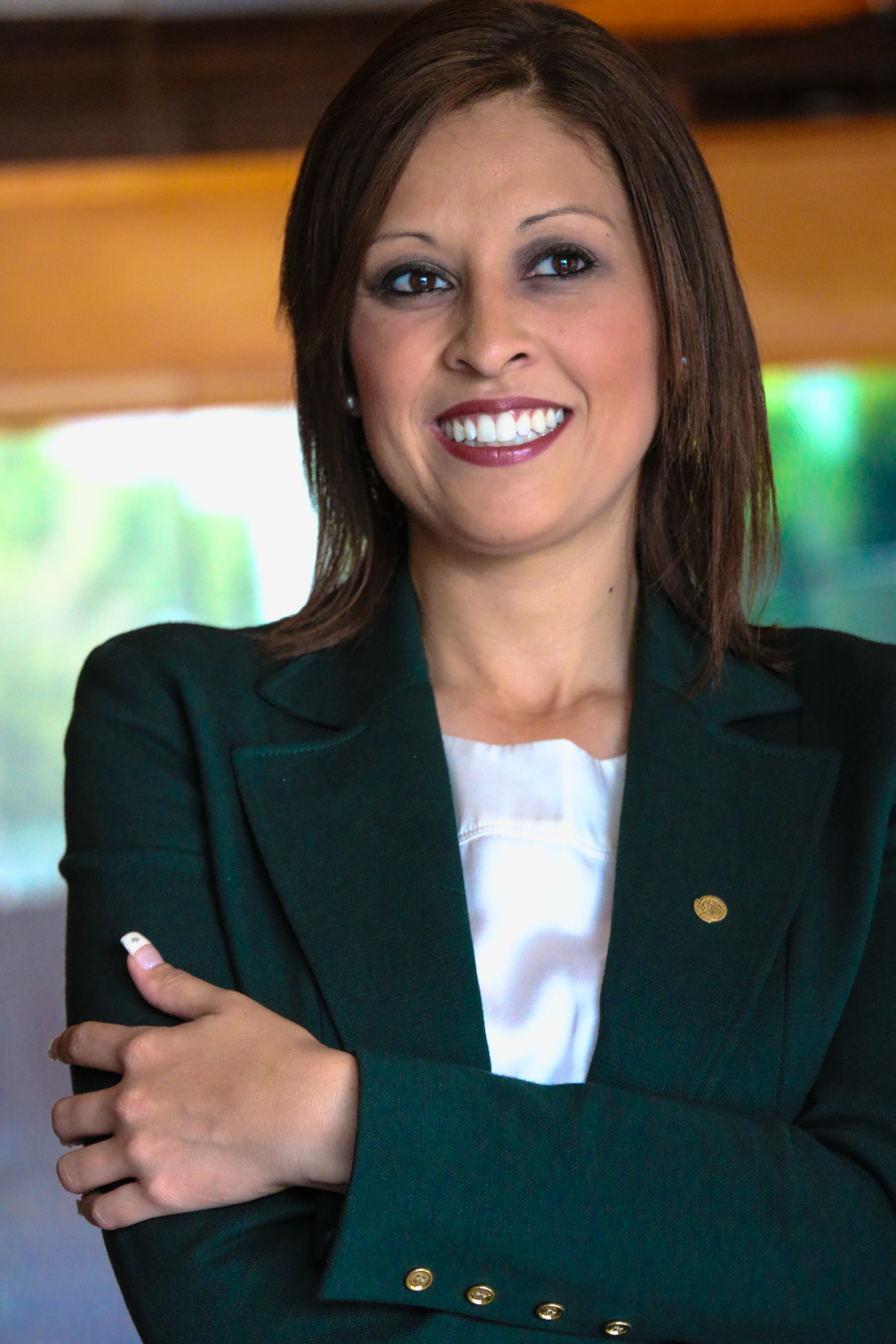
- Born: 25 September 1982 (age 43)
- Occupation: Politician
- Political party: PRI

Sue Ellen Bernal Bolnik (born 25 September 1982) is a Mexican politician affiliated with the Institutional Revolutionary Party (PRI).

In the 2012 general election she was elected to the Chamber of Deputies to represent the State of Mexico's 28th district during the 62nd session of Congress. She returned to Congress in the 2021 mid-terms to represent the State of Mexico's 41st district.

Bernal contended for the State of Mexico's 20th district (which broadly replaced the 41st after redistricting) in the 2024 general election but was defeated by Montserrat Ruiz Paez of the National Regeneration Movement.
