= Teresa Mojica =

Mexican politician

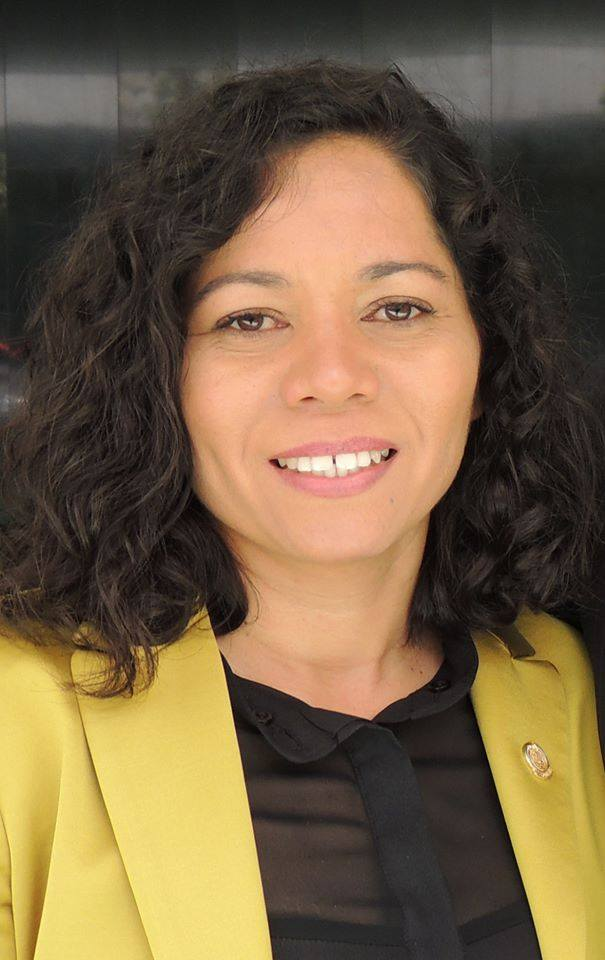
- Born: 3 October 1963 (age 62); Azoyú, Guerrero, Mexico
- Occupation: Deputy
- Political party: PRD

Teresa de Jesús Mojica Morga (born 3 October 1963) is a Mexican politician affiliated with the PRD. As of 2013 she served as Deputy of the LXII Legislature of the Mexican Congress representing Guerrero.
