= Shirley Campbell Barr =

Costa Rican poet, activist and anthropologist

- Born: San José, Costa Rica
- Other names: Shirley Campbell
- Occupations: anthropologist, writer, activist
- Relatives: Epsy Campbell Barr (sister)

Shirley Campbell Barr is a Costa Rican anthropologist, activist and poet. Her poetic works give voice to her activism set on empowering black women and encouraging them to establish their place in history. Her poem Rotundamente negra (Absolutely Black, 1994) has become a symbol for women in the Afro-descendant women's movements in Latin America for its self-affirming pro-black message.

== Early life and education ==
Shirley Campbell Barr was born in San José, Costa Rica to Shirley Barr Aird and Luis Campbell Patterson. She grew up in a family of two brothers and five sisters, including Epsy Campbell Barr, vice president of Costa Rica. Both of her grandmothers arrived in Costa Rica from Jamaica and from childhood, Campbell spoke Jamaican English. She attended the arts school, Conservatorio de Castella, where she first studied poetry under Ronald Bonilla and Osvaldo Sauma. She recognized that her writing could be used as an instrument to foster change in the perceptions that people of African descent had of themselves and their place in society. While at the conservatory, she began to act in plays and study literature. She attended the University of Costa Rica, earning a degree in anthropology in 1993. She married fellow Costa Rican, Harold Robinson Davis, and because of his work at the United Nations, moved to Zimbabwe in 1994. She took post graduate courses in African history and feminism at the University of Zimbabwe of Harare, while living there for two years.

== Career ==
In 1996, Campbell moved back to Central America and spent three years teaching in El Salvador, and working as an activist with the Garifuna people in Honduras, where she lived briefly but left because of Hurricane Mitch. After moving to Jamaica for a time, she lived in the United States, Brazil, and Panama, building a broad knowledge of the ways in which the African diaspora have been impacted by globalization. Completing her master's degree in international cooperation and development in 2004 at the Catholic University of Santa María in Arequipa, Peru, Campbell then studied and completed her training at the Fundación Cultural y Estudios Sociales (Cultural and Social Studies Foundation) in Valencia, Spain.

In talking about her writing career, Campbell has said that her goal is to become a role model and to empower black women, allow them to see themselves reflected in society, since they have been historically omitted from representation in academia, media, power structures, and even toys. She considers herself an activist who gives voice to her cause through her writing. Her work has been widely distributed in Latin America and the Caribbean and translated into English, French, and Portuguese. Her first published book, Naciendo (Being Born, 1988) deals with the discovering one's origins and placing them in a historical and cultural context. Her second book, Rotundamente negra (Absolutely Black, 1994), is an iconic work which is widely known by black women from the Caribbean and throughout the Americas. It has become an anthem of sorts for women who participate in the network of Afro-descendant women's groups which have grown exponentially since the 1990s. The first lines of the poem are an unapologetic and self-affirming pro-black statement: "Me niego rotundamente/ a negar mi voz/ mi sangre y mi piel" [I absolutely refuse / to deny my voice,/ my blood and my skin]. Overall, the work does not objectify or sexualize black women's bodies, but validates Campbell's own perception of her appearance from her own aesthetic sense.

In addition to writing, Campbell participates in educational events worldwide in an effort to encourage black women to write their own stories. She has presented essays like Asumiendo responsabilidad por la palabra (Taking Responsibility for the Word) at events like a regional seminar for black women hosted by the United Nations Development Programme in Montevideo, Uruguay in 2009. She has been an invited speaker at the First Meeting of Afro-descendant Writers hosted in 2019 by the University of Costa Rica, and for the exhibition Ancestralidad, África en Nosotros (Ancestry, Africa in Us) held at The Museum of the Institute for Research and Dissemination of Black Cultures in Buenos Aires, Argentina, the same year. "Her poems have been incorporated into various popular performances in Latin America, such as popular radio soap operas, plays, songs, choral poetry, etc. in Argentina, Spain, Colombia, Bolivia, the Dominican Republic and Costa Rica, among others".

== Works ==
- Campbell Barr, Shirley (1988). Naciendo [Being Born] (in Spanish). San José, Costa Rica: Universidad Estatal a Distancia. OCLC 23141415.
- Campbell Barr, Shirley (1994). Rotundamente negra [Absolutely Black] (in Spanish) (1st ed.). San José, Costa Rica: Ediciones Arado. OCLC 36942708.
- Campbell Barr, Shirley; Meoño, Rodolfo (2007). Desde el Principio fue la Mezcla [From the Beginning There Was Mixture] (in Spanish). Heredia, Costa Rica: Instituto de Estudios Latinoamericanos.
- McDonald, Delia; Campbell Barr, Shirley, eds. (2011). Palabras indelebles de poetas negras [Indelible Words of Black Poets] (in Spanish). San José, Costa Rica: Universidad Nacional de Costa Rica.
- Campbell Barr, Shirley (2013). Rotundamente negra y otros poemas [Absolutely Black and Other Poems] (in Spanish) (1st ed.). Madrid: Torremozas. ISBN 978-84-7839-540-8.
