= Raúl Aarón Pozos =

Mexican politician

- Born: Raúl Aarón Pozos Lanz; 30 June 1967 (age 58)
- Occupation: Senator
- Political party: PRI

Raúl Aarón Pozos Lanz (born 30 June 1967) is a Mexican politician affiliated with the PRI. He currently serves as Senator of the LXII Legislature of the Mexican Congress representing Campeche.
