= Xavier Azuara Zúñiga =

Mexican politician

- Born: 16 September 1979 (age 46); Tanquián de Escobedo, San Luis Potosí, Mexico
- Occupation: Politician
- Political party: PAN

Xavier Azuara Zúñiga (born 16 September 1979) is a Mexican politician affiliated with the National Action Party (PAN). In the 2012 general election he was elected to the Chamber of Deputies to represent San Luis Potosí's 5th district during the 62nd session of Congress. He returned to Congress in the 2021 mid-terms as a plurinominal deputy.
