= Armando Guadiana Tijerina =

Mexican politician (1946–2023)

Senator of the Congress of the Union for Coahuila
- In office 1 September 2018 – 23 October 2023 Serving with Eva Galaz Caletti and Verónica Martínez García
- Preceded by: Luis Fernando Salazar Fernández

Personal details
- Born: Santana Armando Guadiana Tijerina; 2 March 1946; Múzquiz, Coahuila, Mexico
- Died: 26 December 2023 (aged 77); Monterrey, Nuevo León, Mexico
- Political party: Morena
- Education: Monterrey Institute of Technology and Higher Education
- Occupation: Civil engineer, businessman, politician

Santana Armando Guadiana Tijerina (2 March 1946 – 26 December 2023) was a Mexican civil engineer, businessman and politician who was a member of the National Regeneration Movement.

== Life and career ==
Born in Múzquiz, Coahuila, he was a civil engineer and had a Master of Science, with a specialty in Operations Research, both degrees were obtained at the Monterrey Institute of Technology and Higher Education (ITESM).

Guadiana Tijerina was a member of the Association of Mining Engineers, Metallurgists and Geologists of Mexico, AC, Councilor of the Mining Chamber of Mexico from 1996.

Among his companies was the commercialization of coal.

Within his political activities, he served as general director of the Cadastre of the State of Coahuila from 1971 to 1973 and was a local deputy in the Congress of Coahuila for the X District, Carboniferous Region from 1973 to 1976.

Guadiana Tijerina was president of the Saraperos de Saltillo baseball club for more than 10 years and was part of the board of directors of the Panteras de Saltillo Soccer Team and was involved in various social activities in collaboration with the Lions Club, among other community service organizations.

In 2017 he competed as a candidate of the National Regeneration Movement for governor of Coahuila within the framework of the 2017 Coahuila state elections, losing to Miguel Riquelme of the Institutional Revolutionary Party, coming in third place with 11.99% of the votes.

Guadiana Tijerina was a candidate for Senator for MORENA in 2018 for the state of Coahuila and won his seat thanks to 510 thousand votes, being president of the Energy Commission.

Guadiana Tijerina was a candidate for municipal president of Saltillo for the MORENA party in the 2021 Coahuila State Elections, coming in second place with 115,191 votes.

He returned to his duties as senator in June 2021.

On 12 December, Mario Delgado, National President of MORENA, announced that Guadiana Tijerina had won the poll to determine the candidate for governor for the State of Coahuila.

On Friday, 13 January, the pre-campaign began.

On 4 June 2023, he lost the gubernatorial elections, coming in second place, achieving only 20% of the votes according to the quick count.

Guadiana Tijerina died from prostate cancer on 26 December 2023, at the age of 77.

=== Controversies ===
Guadiana Tijerina appeared in the Pandora Papers, as the founder of a trust that protects 50,000 shares of a company located in the British Virgin Islands, part of a network that uses tax havens to hide undeclared fortunes.

In 2012, the Attorney General's Office of the Republic began an investigation folder for operations with resources of illicit origin, currency counterfeiting and organized crime against Armando Guadiana, his family and one of his companies, which is active to date.

In 2020, an investigation revealed that four companies of the then senator were listed as suppliers to the Federal Electricity Commission, with which Guadiana would earn at least 57.9 million pesos if the companies were hired.

In 1993 Armando Guadiana was imprisoned in the Topo Chico prison for a tax debt derived from an accusation of fraud and falsification of documents, initiated by the National Foreign Credit Bank (Bancomext). He himself reported that some of his companies suffered economic setbacks and had to resort to the suspension of payments law, for which he was arrested and presented to the authorities.
