= Faustino López Vargas =

Mexican politician (1958–2022)

Senator of the Congress of the Union from Tamaulipas
- In office 10 January 2022 – 8 October 2022
- Preceded by: Américo Villarreal Anaya

Personal details
- Born: 27 September 1958 Aldama, Tamaulipas, Mexico
- Died: 8 October 2022 (aged 64) Trancoso, Zacatecas, Mexico
- Party: MORENA
- Occupation: Physician, politician

Faustino López Vargas (27 September 1958 – 8 October 2022) was a Mexican politician from the Morena party. He served in the Senate representing the state of Tamaulipas from January 2022 until his death. He died in a car crash in Zacatecas.

== Life ==
=== Medical career ===
López Vargas received a medical degree from the Universidad del Noreste and served as a physician at rural clinics associated with the Mexican Social Security Institute (IMSS) in various localities in Oaxaca, including Santa María Xadani, Ejutla de Crespo, Huajuapan de León, and Santiago Jamiltepec. In 1987, he moved to his hometown of Aldama, Tamaulipas, where he opened a private medical practice that continued until 2001. He also served as a forensic physician in Aldama and the state capital of Ciudad Victoria and as a private physician to the National Banking Commission.

In 2017 and 2019, respectively, López became affiliated with two hospitals in Ciudad Victoria, the General Hospital and Regional Specialty Hospital. He also was named coordinator of state first aid medical services in 2019.

=== Politics ===
In 1989, López Vargas was a founding member of the Party of the Democratic Revolution (PRD), serving on that party's state committee in Tamaulipas before becoming a founding member of Morena in 2014.

In 2018, López was selected to serve as the alternate to Américo Villarreal Anaya, who was elected to the Senate in that year's election. After Villarreal left the Senate in January 2022 in order to run for Governor of Tamaulipas, López Vargas assumed the seat. Villarreal briefly returned to the Senate from 26–28 September 2022, but left the seat because he could not serve simultaneously as senator and governor, after which time López again returned to the Senate. Committee assignments included Legislative Studies (Second), Energy, Navy, and Health.

=== Death ===
López Vargas and his wife, Pilar Hernández, died on 8 October 2022 in an automobile crash in Trancoso, Zacatecas, while on their way to attend a government report to be given by Zacatecas senator Soledad Luévano Cantú in the city of Zacatecas. The driver lost control after puncturing a tire. Three other people were in the vehicle and suffered serious injuries. Senator Luévano's report was canceled in the wake of the news of López Vargas's death.

As López Vargas was an alternate senator, the Senate seat he left behind was declared vacant, and a special election was held on 19 February 2023 to elect a new senator and alternate. With around 70% of the popular vote, José Ramón Gómez Leal of Morena was declared the victor.
