= Alejandro Gómez Olvera =

Mexican politician

- Born: 5 October 1958 (age 67); Azcapotzalco, Federal District, Mexico
- Occupation: Politician
- Political party: PRD

Alejandro Gómez Olvera (born 5 October 1958) is a Mexican politician from the Party of the Democratic Revolution (PRD). In the 2000 general election he was elected to the Chamber of Deputies to represent the State of Mexico's 28th district during the 58th session of Congress.
