= Sergio Peñaloza Pérez =

Mexican professor and activist

Pedro Sergio Peñaloza Pérez (Cuajinicuilapa, Guerrero, Mexico, September 8, 1953) is a Mexican professor and activist, former president of the anti-racist organization México Negro A.C.

== Biography ==
With a degree in education from the Autonomous University of Guerrero, his work as an activist has consisted of promoting respect and knowledge of the rights of Afro-descendants in Mexico for more than twenty years.

Sergio Peñaloza is currently the longest-serving Afro-Mexican activist in the fight for the constitutional recognition of black people in Mexico.

In 1997, he founded México Negro, the oldest Afro-descendant organization in the country and of which he is the leader. From this position, he has organized popular, academic, and folkloric forums, as well as participated in events on Afro-descendants abroad.

In 2017, he participated in the collection of signatures to become a pre-candidate for the presidency of Mexico through an independent candidacy, however, he was unsuccessful. During the same year, he participated in the construction of a proposal for constitutional reform in Mexico City, with the objective of recognizing people of African descent on a territorial basis, without limiting official recognition to legal visibility.
