= Michel González Márquez =

Mexican politician (born 1988)

Member of the Senate of the Republic
- Incumbent
- Assumed office 1 September 2024

Member of the Chamber of Deputies
- In office 2018–2024
- Constituency: Guanajuato's 7th district

Personal details
- Born: 21 January 1988 (age 38)
- Party: National Action Party

Karen Michel González Márquez (born 21 January 1988) is a Mexican politician from the National Action Party (PAN). In 2024, she was elected a member of the Senate of the Republic.

González Márquez was born in the state of Guanajuato in 1988. She holds a bacherlor's degree in international trade from the University of Guanajuato.

In the 2018 general election, she was elected to the Chamber of Deputies for Guanajuato's 7th district (San Francisco del Rincón), and she won re-election for the same seat in the 2021 mid-terms.

She was elected as a senator-at-large from the National Action Party's national list in the 2024 Senate election.
