= Óscar Román Rosas =

Mexican politician

Óscar Román Rosas González
- Born: 14 September 1968 (age 57); Ciudad del Carmen, Campeche, Mexico
- Education: Autonomous University of Carmen
- Political party: PRI

Óscar Román Rosas González (born 14 September 1968) is a Mexican politician affiliated with the Institutional Revolutionary Party (PRI). He served as a senator for Campeche in the 62nd and 62nd sessions of Congress (2012–2018) and as a federal deputy in the 61st Congress (2009–2012), representing Campeche's 2nd district. He was elected the municipal president of Ciudad del Carmen in 2018.
