= Luis Ángel Espinoza Cházaro =

Mexican politician

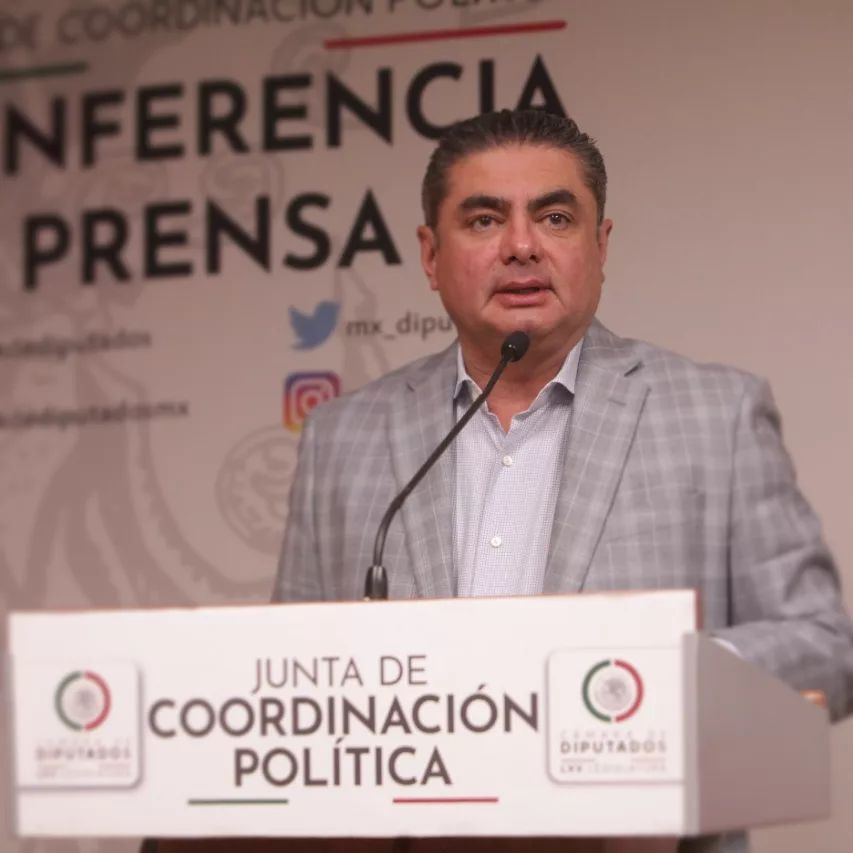
- Born: 7 May 1974 (age 52); Guadalajara, Jalisco, Mexico
- Occupation: Politician
- Political party: PRD

Luis Ángel Xariel Espinoza Cházaro (born 7 May 1974) is a Mexican politician affiliated with the Party of the Democratic Revolution (PRD). In the 2012 general election he was elected to the Chamber of Deputies to represent the 11th district of the Federal District during the 62nd Congress.
