= Guadalupe Covarrubias Cervantes =

Mexican politician

María Guadalupe Covarrubias Cervantes (born 8 May 1940) is a Mexican politician, affiliated with the National Regeneration Movement party. Since September 1, 2018, she has been a senator of the Republic in the LXIV legislature of the Congress of the Union representing the state of Tamaulipas.

== Early years ==
María Guadalupe Covarrubias Cervantes was born on 8 May 1940 in Tampico, Tamaulipas. She studied a bachelor's degree in secondary education, with a specialty in history at the Escuela Normal Superior de Tamaulipas, and a master's degree in education. She was an elementary school teacher, elementary principal, and principal of a federal high school.

== Political career ==
She has been a member of the National Regeneration Movement (Morena) party since its founding in 2014, being the party's national advisor. In the 2015 federal elections she was the party's candidate for federal deputy for district 8 of Tamaulipas, based in Tampico, obtaining only 5.8% of the votes.

In the 2018 federal elections, she was nominated as senator of the Republic representing the state of Tamaulipas. After the elections, she held the second-place seat in the LXIV Legislature of the Congress of the Union since September 1, 2018. In the Senate, she is secretary of the Culture Committee and of the Committee on the Rights of Children and Adolescents.
