= LXVI Legislature of the Mexican Congress =

66th Congress (LXVI Legislatura)
←	65th	67th	→
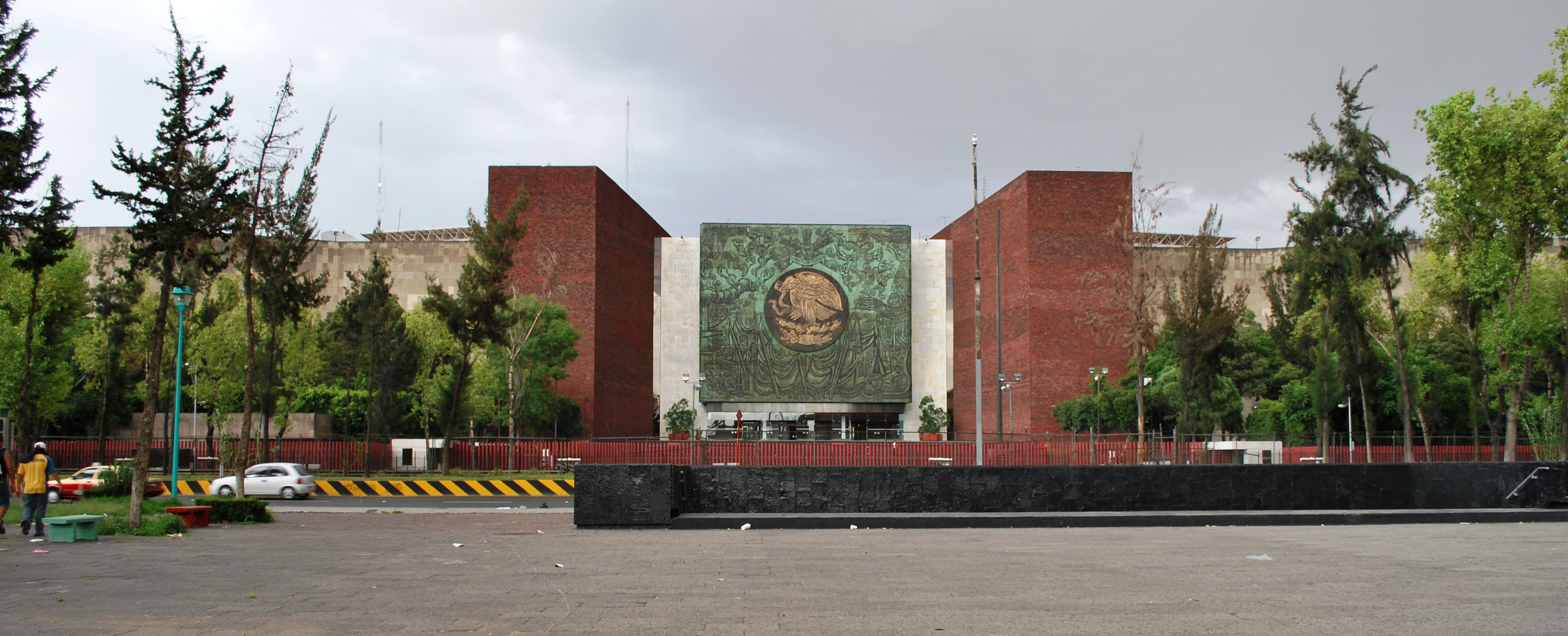
- Legislative Palace of San Lázaro

Overview
- Legislative body: Congress of the Union
- Term: 1 September 2024 – 31 August 2027
- Election: 2 June 2024

Senate
- Members: 128 senators
- President: Gerardo Fernández Noroña (1 September 2024 – 31 August 2025); Laura Itzel Castillo (1 September 2025 – 31 August 2026); Higinio Martínez Miranda (1 September 2026 – present)

Chamber of Deputies
- Members: 500 deputies
- President: Ifigenia Martínez y Hernández (1 September – 5 October 2024); Sergio Gutiérrez Luna (8 October 2024 – 2 September 2025); Kenia López Rabadán (2 September 2025 – 31 August 2026); Raúl Bolaños Cacho Cué (1 September 2026 – present)

The LXVI Legislature of the Congress of the Union (66th Congress) is the current session of the legislative branch of Mexico, composed of the Chamber of Deputies and the Senate of the Republic. It convened on 1 September 2024, and will end on 31 August 2027, covering the final month of Andrés Manuel López Obrador's term in office and the first three years of Claudia Sheinbaum's presidency.

Both chambers of Congress were elected in the 2024 general election. There were three competing forces: the Sigamos Haciendo Historia coalition, consisting of the National Regeneration Movement (Morena), the Labor Party (PT), and the Ecologist Green Party of Mexico (PVEM); the Fuerza y Corazón por México coalition, comprising the National Action Party (PAN), the Institutional Revolutionary Party (PRI), and the Party of the Democratic Revolution (PRD); and the Citizens' Movement (MC), the only party to run without allies.

Sigamos Haciendo Historia won a supermajority in the Chamber of Deputies, granting the ruling coalition 73% of the seats, the highest share since the LII Legislature in 1982, during Miguel de la Madrid's presidency. Although the coalition fell three seats short of a supermajority in the Senate, defections by two senators elected for the PRD on 28 August closed the gap to one. The supermajority was ultimately secured with the defection to Morena of Cynthia López, elected for the PRI in Mexico City, on 12 November. This marked the first time since the LIII Legislature in 1985 that the ruling coalition held a supermajority in both chambers.

== Major events ==
- 29 August 2024: Members-elect are sworn in. Gerardo Fernández Noroña is elected President of the Senate and Ifigenia Martínez y Hernández is elected President of the Chamber of Deputies for the first year of the legislature.
- 1 September 2024: The legislature convenes.
- 10 September 2024: Protesters opposing the judicial reform bill storm the Senate building, temporarily halting the session discussing the reforms. The Senate reconvenes in its former premises and passes the bill by an 86–41 vote at around 04:00 CST the following morning.
- 25 September 2024: The Senate approves, 86–42, a constitutional amendment that transfers control of the National Guard to the Secretariat of National Defense, following the Chamber of Deputies' 353–126 vote on 19 September.
- 30 September 2024: Senators Omar García Harfuch, Ernestina Godoy and Citlalli Hernández (all Morena) take leave to join Sheinbaum's cabinet. Godoy's alternate, Karen Castrejón Trujillo, sits with the PVEM, moving one seat from Morena to the Greens.
- 1 October 2024: Claudia Sheinbaum is sworn in as President of Mexico before a joint session of Congress.
- 5 October 2024: President of the Chamber of Deputies Ifigenia Martínez y Hernández dies.
- 8 October 2024: Sergio Gutiérrez Luna is elected President of the Chamber of Deputies.
- 9 October 2024: The Senate unanimously approves a constitutional amendment aimed at ensuring that the minimum wage rises above inflation.
- 16 October 2024: The Senate unanimously approves a constitutional amendment that enables the State to reclaim the right to provide passenger train transportation, which the Chamber of Deputies had passed 472–0 on 8 October. The same day it approves, 86–39, an energy amendment that reestablishes the Federal Electricity Commission (CFE) and Pemex as public enterprises and requires the CFE to retain a 54% share of electricity generation, following the Chamber of Deputies' 350–111 vote on 9 October.
- 30 October 2024: The Chamber of Deputies approves, 343–129, a constitutional amendment that enshrines constitutional supremacy, allowing legal challenges to constitutional amendments only on procedural grounds, following the Senate's 85–41 vote on 24 October.
- 12 November 2024: Morena and its allies secure a supermajority in the Senate when Senator Cynthia López Castro, who left the PRI caucus on 29 October, joins Morena's caucus.
- 23 November 2024: The PAN formally removes Senator Miguel Ángel Yunes Márquez of Veracruz from its caucus. He had voted for the judicial reform in September, against his party's position, and had been expelled from the PAN on 14 November.
- 12 February 2025: The Senate submits the final list of candidates for the 2025 Mexican judicial elections to the National Electoral Institute (INE).
- 4 March 2025: The Chamber of Deputies approves, 432–28, a constitutional amendment banning immediate reelection and barring relatives of sitting officeholders from seeking the same office, effective from 2030, following the Senate's 97–26 vote on 25 February.
- 25 March 2025: The Chamber of Deputies votes 291–158–12 to approve a committee report rejecting the Morelos state prosecutor's request to strip Deputy Cuauhtémoc Blanco (Morena) of his immunity from prosecution; the prosecutor had sought to investigate him for the attempted rape of his half-sister.
- 2 July 2025: Congress closes a nine-day extraordinary session in which it passed 14 reforms to 25 laws, among them a new telecommunications and broadcasting law that abolishes the Federal Telecommunications Institute, a National Guard law, a national intelligence system law and changes to the General Population Law introducing a biometric CURP. Opposition legislators label the package "spy laws".
- 29 August 2025: Laura Itzel Castillo is elected President of the Senate for the second year of the legislature.
- 31 August 2025: The Chamber of Deputies postpones the renewal of its Board of Directors amid Morena's rejection of PAN proposals; Sergio Gutiérrez Luna remains President of the Chamber of Deputies.
- 1 September 2025: At the opening of the second year, Secretary of the Interior Rosa Icela Rodríguez delivers Sheinbaum's first government report to Congress without addressing the chamber. That night the nine justices of the Supreme Court chosen in the 2025 judicial elections, led by Hugo Aguilar Ortiz, are sworn in before the Senate, followed by nearly 900 other elected judges and magistrates.
- 2 September 2025: Kenia López Rabadán is elected President of the Chamber of Deputies for the second year of the legislature.
- 15 October 2025: Congress completes passage of a reform of the Amparo Law when the Senate accepts the Chamber of Deputies' changes, 83–38. The Senate had first passed the bill 76–39 on 1 October with a transitional article applying the new rules to cases already under way; after criticism that the provision was retroactive, the Chamber removed it and passed the bill 345–131–3 on 14 October.
- 27 November 2025: The Senate approves the resignation of Attorney General Alejandro Gertz Manero in a 74–22 vote.
- 3 December 2025: After compiling a list of ten candidates for Attorney General, which the President narrows to three, the Senate appoints Ernestina Godoy Ramos in a 97–19 vote.
- 4 December 2025: The Senate approves without changes, 85–36, a new General Water Law and a reform of the National Waters Law, which the Chamber of Deputies had passed 328–131–5 the previous day as farmers ringed the Legislative Palace of San Lázaro with tractors.
- 1 February 2026: Adán Augusto López steps down as leader of Morena's Senate caucus and is replaced by Ignacio Mier, who also takes over the chamber's Political Coordination Board.
- 25 February 2026: Congress completes passage of a constitutional amendment cutting the maximum work week from 48 to 40 hours, phased in from 2027 to 2030, when the Chamber of Deputies approves it 469–0, following the Senate's 121–0 vote on 11 February. It is declared in force on 3 March after ratification by 22 state legislatures.
- 11 March 2026: The Chamber of Deputies rejects Sheinbaum's electoral reform, 259–234–1, short of the 334 votes needed for a constitutional amendment, after Morena's allies the PT and PVEM side with the opposition.
- 8 April 2026: The Chamber of Deputies approves, 377–102, a narrower "Plan B" electoral amendment limiting the size of municipal councils, capping state congress budgets and holding electoral officials' pay to the constitutional salary ceiling. The Senate had passed it 87–41 on 25 March, after the PT stripped out changes to presidential recall votes.
- 28 May 2026: Congress completes passage of a constitutional amendment postponing the second judicial election from 2027 to 2028 and allowing sitting magistrates of the Electoral Tribunal to stand again, when the Senate approves it 87–41, following the Chamber of Deputies' 341–124 vote on 26 May.
- 26 August 2026: Senator Enrique Inzunza of Sinaloa leaves Morena's caucus to sit as an independent, months after the United States Department of Justice accused him of links to the Sinaloa Cartel, which he denies.
- 31 August 2026: Higinio Martínez (Morena) is elected President of the Senate, with 116 votes, and Raúl Bolaños Cacho Cué (PVEM) President of the Chamber of Deputies, 432–1–10, for the third year of the legislature.
- 1 September 2026: Rodríguez delivers Sheinbaum's second government report to Congress, again without addressing the chamber.
- 29 September 2026: Congress completes passage of a constitutional amendment requiring the President, state governors, and the Head of Government of Mexico City to hold Mexican nationality alone, when the Senate approves it 86–42, following the Chamber of Deputies' 344–116–1 vote on 22 September.

== Major legislation ==
=== Constitutional amendments ===
DOF Citation	Official title	Votes		Published
DOF Citation	Official title	Deputies	Senate	Published
15-09-2024	A decree to amend, add, and repeal various provisions of the Political Constitution of the United Mexican States, regarding the reform of the Judicial Branch Decreto por el que se reforman, adicionan y derogan diversas disposiciones de la Constitución Política de los Estados Unidos Mexicanos, en materia de reforma del Poder Judicial	4 September 2024 (357–130)	11 September 2024 (86–41)	15 September 2024
30-09-2024	A decree to amend, add, and repeal various provisions of the Political Constitution of the United Mexican States, regarding Indigenous and Afro-Mexican Peoples and Communities Decreto por el que se reforman, adicionan y derogan diversas disposiciones del artículo 2o. de la Constitución Política de los Estados Unidos Mexicanos, en materia de Pueblos y Comunidades Indígenas y Afromexicanos	18 September 2024 (483–0)	24 September 2024 (128–0)	30 September 2024
30-09-2024	A decree to amend and add Articles 13, 16, 21, 32, 55, 73, 76, 78, 82, 89, 123, and 129 of the Political Constitution of the United Mexican States, regarding the National Guard Decreto por el que se reforman y adicionan los artículos 13, 16, 21, 32, 55, 73, 76, 78, 82, 89, 123 y 129 de la Constitución Política de los Estados Unidos Mexicanos, en materia de Guardia Nacional	19 September 2024 (353–126)	24 September 2024 (86–42)	30 September 2024
30-10-2024	A decree to amend the fourth paragraph and add a fifth paragraph to Article 28 of the Political Constitution of the United Mexican States, regarding railways and railway transportation Decreto por el que se reforma el párrafo cuarto y se adiciona un párrafo quinto al artículo 28 de la Constitución Política de los Estados Unidos Mexicanos, en materia de vías y transporte ferroviario	8 October 2024 (472–0)	16 October 2024 (123–0)	30 October 2024
31-10-2024	A decree to amend the fifth paragraph of Article 25, the sixth and seventh paragraphs of Article 27, and the fourth paragraph of Article 28 of the Political Constitution of the United Mexican States, regarding strategic areas and enterprises Decreto por el que se reforman el párrafo quinto del artículo 25, los párrafos sexto y séptimo del artículo 27 y el párrafo cuarto del artículo 28 de la Constitución Política de los Estados Unidos Mexicanos, en materia de áreas y empresas estratégicas	9 October 2024 (350–111)	16 October 2024 (86–39)	31 October 2024
31-10-2024	A decree to amend the first paragraph of Section II of Article 107 and add a fifth paragraph to Article 105 of the Political Constitution of the United Mexican States, regarding the unchallengeability of additions or amendments to the Federal Constitution Decreto por el que se reforma el primer párrafo de la fracción II del artículo 107, y se adiciona un quinto párrafo al artículo 105, de la Constitución Política de los Estados Unidos Mexicanos, en materia de inimpugnabilidad de las adiciones o reformas a la Constitución Federal	30 October 2024 (343–129)	24 October 2024 (85–41)	31 October 2024
15-11-2024	A decree to amend and add Articles 4, 21, 41, 73, 116, 122, and 123 of the Political Constitution of the United Mexican States, regarding substantive equality, gender perspective, women's right to a life free of violence, and the elimination of the gender pay gap Decreto por el que se reforman y adicionan los artículos 4o., 21, 41, 73, 116, 122 y 123 de la Constitución Política de los Estados Unidos Mexicanos, en materia de igualdad sustantiva, perspectiva de género, derecho de las mujeres a una vida libre de violencia y erradicación de la brecha salarial por razones de género	5 November 2024 (468–0)	24 October 2024 (126–0)	15 November 2024
02-12-2024	A decree to amend and add Articles 4 and 27 of the Political Constitution of the United Mexican States, regarding well-being Decreto por el que se reforman y adicionan los artículos 4o. y 27 de la Constitución Política de los Estados Unidos Mexicanos, en materia de bienestar	22 October 2024 (408–65)	30 October 2024 (117–0)	2 December 2024
02-12-2024	A decree to amend and add Section XII of Subsection A of Article 123 of the Political Constitution of the United Mexican States, regarding housing for workers Decreto por el que se reforma y adiciona la fracción XII del Apartado A del artículo 123 de la Constitución Política de los Estados Unidos Mexicanos, en materia de vivienda para las personas trabajadoras	23 October 2024 (472–0)	31 October 2024 (103–0)	2 December 2024
02-12-2024	A decree to amend and add Articles 3, 4, and 73 of the Political Constitution of the United Mexican States, regarding animal protection and care Decreto por el que se reforman y adicionan los artículos 3o, 4o y 73 de la Constitución Política de los Estados Unidos Mexicanos, en materia de protección y cuidado animal	12 November 2024 (441–0)	21 November 2024 (118–0)	2 December 2024
20-12-2024	A decree to amend, add, and repeal various provisions of the Political Constitution of the United Mexican States, regarding organizational simplification Decreto por el que se reforman, adicionan y derogan diversas disposiciones de la Constitución Política de los Estados Unidos Mexicanos, en materia de simplificación orgánica	20 November 2024 (332–119)	28 November 2024 (86–40)	20 December 2024
31-12-2024	A decree to amend the second paragraph of Article 19 of the Political Constitution of the United Mexican States, regarding mandatory pretrial detention Decreto por el que se reforma el párrafo segundo del artículo 19 de la Constitución Política de los Estados Unidos Mexicanos, en materia de prisión preventiva oficiosa	13 November 2024 (335–108)	27 November 2024 (93–35)	31 December 2024
31-12-2024	A decree to amend and add Article 21 of the Political Constitution of the United Mexican States, regarding public security Decreto por el que se reforma y adiciona el artículo 21 de la Constitución Política de los Estados Unidos Mexicanos, en materia de seguridad pública	21 November 2024 (441–0)	13 November 2024 (122–0)	31 December 2024
17-01-2025	A decree to add a fifth paragraph to Article 4 and a second paragraph to Article 5 of the Political Constitution of the United Mexican States, regarding health protection Decreto por el que se adicionan un párrafo quinto al artículo 4o y un párrafo segundo al artículo 5o, de la Constitución Política de los Estados Unidos Mexicanos, en materia de protección a la salud	3 December 2024 (327–118)	11 December 2024 (86–39)	17 January 2025
17-03-2025	A decree to amend and add various provisions of Articles 4 and 27 of the Political Constitution of the United Mexican States, regarding the conservation and protection of native maize. Decreto por el que se reforman y adicionan diversas disposiciones de los artículos 4o. y 27 de la Constitución Política de los Estados Unidos Mexicanos, en materia de conservación y protección de los maíces nativos.	25 February 2025 (382–88)	5 March 2025 (88–18)	17 March 2025
01-04-2025	A decree to add a second paragraph to Article 123 of the Political Constitution of the United Mexican States, regarding support for youth Decreto por el que se adiciona un segundo párrafo al artículo 123 de la Constitución Política de los Estados Unidos Mexicanos, en materia de apoyo a jóvenes.	25 September 2024 (473–0)	11 March 2025 (112–0)	1 April 2025
01-04-2025	A decree to amend and supplement Articles 55, 59, 82, 115, 116, and 122 of the Political Constitution of the United Mexican States, regarding non-reelection and electoral nepotism Decreto por el que se reforman y adicionan los artículos 55, 59, 82, 115, 116 y 122 de la Constitución Política de los Estados Unidos Mexicanos, en materia de no reelección y nepotismo electoral.	4 March 2025 (432–28)	25 February 2025 (97–26)	1 April 2025
01-04-2025	A decree to amend the second paragraph of Article 19 and add second and third paragraphs to Article 40 of the Political Constitution of the United Mexican States, regarding the strengthening of national sovereignty Decreto por el que se reforma el segundo párrafo del artículo 19 y se adicionan los párrafos segundo y tercero al artículo 40 de la Constitución Política de los Estados Unidos Mexicanos, en materia de fortalecimiento de la soberanía nacional.	11 March 2025 (327–116)	26 February 2025 (100–17)	1 April 2025
15-04-2025	A decree to amend the tenth paragraph of Article 25 and Subsection XXIX-Y of Article 73 of the Political Constitution of the United Mexican States, regarding administrative simplification and digitalization Decreto por el que se reforman el párrafo décimo del artículo 25 y la fracción XXIX-Y del artículo 73 de la Constitución Política de los Estados Unidos Mexicanos, en materia de simplificación administrativa y digitalización.	19 March 2025 (425–19)	12 March 2025 (107–3)	15 April 2025

=== Budgets ===
Year	Official title	Votes		Published	Total expenditures
Year	Official title	Deputies	Senate	Published	Total expenditures
2025	Law of Revenues of the Federation for the Fiscal Year 2025 Ley de Ingresos de la Federación para el Ejercicio Fiscal de 2025	26 November 2024 (367–95)	4 December 2024 (84–36)	19 December 2024	MX$9.302 trillion
2025	Budget of Expenditures of the Federation for the Fiscal Year 2025 Presupuesto de Egresos de la Federación para el Ejercicio Fiscal 2025	11 December 2024 (349–129)	—N/a	24 December 2024	MX$9.302 trillion
2026	Law of Revenues of the Federation for the Fiscal Year 2026 Ley de Ingresos de la Federación para el Ejercicio Fiscal de 2026	15 October 2025 (349–128)	29 October 2025 (80–37)	7 November 2025	MX$10.19 trillion
2026	Budget of Expenditures of the Federation for the Fiscal Year 2026 Presupuesto de Egresos de la Federación para el Ejercicio Fiscal 2026	4 November 2025 (358–133)	—N/a	21 November 2025	MX$10.19 trillion

== Party summary ==
These tables relate to the composition of the Senate of the Republic and the Chamber of Deputies at the start of the LXVI Legislature and their current makeup, highlighting the changes in party affiliation that have occurred during the legislature.

=== Senate ===
Senate membership

26 August 2026 – present

Begin (1–30 September 2024)

30 September – 29 October 2024

29 October – 12 November 2024

12–23 November 2024

23 November 2024 – 18 February 2025

18 February 2025 – 27 August 2025

27 August 2025 – 26 August 2026

Party	Start of Legislature	Current seats	±
National Regeneration Movement	66	66	Steady
National Action Party	22	21	▼1
Ecologist Green Party of Mexico	13	14	▲1
Institutional Revolutionary Party	15	13	▼2
Labor Party	6	6	Steady
Citizens' Movement	5	6	▲1
Independents / No party	1	2	▲1
Total	128	128	

=== Chamber of Deputies ===
Chamber membership

27 August 2026 – present

Begin (1 September 2024)

1–19 September 2024

19–20 September 2024

20 September 2024 – 17 September 2025

17 September 2025 – 26 August 2026

26–27 August 2026

Party	Start of Legislature	Current seats	±
National Regeneration Movement	257	254	▼3
National Action Party	71	69	▼2
Ecologist Green Party of Mexico	60	62	▲2
Labor Party	47	49	▲2
Institutional Revolutionary Party	36	36	Steady
Citizens' Movement	27	29	▲2
Independents / No party	1	1	Steady
Party of the Democratic Revolution	1	0	▼1
Total	500	500	

== Leadership ==
=== Senate Board of Directors ===
The Senate's Board of Directors (Mesa Directiva) is composed of a president, three vice presidents and four secretaries, elected by an absolute majority of the senators present in a ballot vote and serving one legislative year, with re-election permitted. For the second and third years it is chosen at a preliminary meeting held in the ten days before sessions open. The Senate has repeatedly gone beyond that statutory minimum, adding posts by parliamentary agreement so that every parliamentary group is represented: a fourth vice presidency and three further secretaryships in September 2024, and eight secretaries in 2025–2026.

==== 2024–2025 ====
The Senate elected its first Board of Directors on 29 August 2024, choosing Gerardo Fernández Noroña (Morena) as president in a ballot vote with 127 votes in favor and one against. On 3 September, the Senate approved an agreement of its Political Coordination Board adding, for that legislative year, a fourth vice presidency for the PVEM and three further secretaryships, allotted to Morena, the PAN and the PRI.

President	Morena	Gerardo Fernández Noroña
Vice presidents	Morena	Imelda Castro Castro
Vice presidents	PAN	Mauricio Vila Dosal
Vice presidents	PRI	Karla Guadalupe Toledo Zamora
Vice presidents	PVEM	Jorge Carlos Ramírez Marín from 3 September 2024
Secretaries	Morena	Verónica Camino Farjat
Secretaries	PVEM	Jasmine María Bugarín Rodríguez
Secretaries	PT	Lizeth Sánchez García
Secretaries	MC	Luis Donaldo Colosio Riojas
Secretaries	Morena	Julieta Andrea Ramírez Padilla from 3 September 2024
Secretaries	PAN	Imelda Margarita Sanmiguel Sánchez from 3 September 2024
Secretaries	PRI	Claudia Edith Anaya Mota from 3 September 2024

==== 2025–2026 ====
At the preliminary meeting of 29 August 2025, the Senate elected Laura Itzel Castillo (Morena) as president by secret ballot, approving the slate with 101 of the 106 votes cast, the remaining five going to other candidates. It was the first time in 96 years that the PRI held neither the presidency nor a vice presidency of the board, a consequence of Senator Néstor Camarillo leaving the party for Citizens' Movement (MC) two days earlier, which reduced the PRI to thirteen senators and fourth place in the chamber. The board comprised eight secretaryships, one for each parliamentary group and three for Morena. Secretary Gustavo Sánchez Vásquez (PAN) died in office on 31 January 2026 and was replaced on 24 February by Gina Gerardina Campuzano González.

President	Morena	Laura Itzel Castillo
Vice presidents	Morena	Verónica Camino Farjat
Vice presidents	PAN	Imelda Sanmiguel Sánchez
Vice presidents	PVEM	Jorge Carlos Ramírez Marín
Secretaries	Morena	Mariela Gutiérrez Escalante
Secretaries	Morena	Sandra Simey Olvera Bautista
Secretaries	Morena	María Martina Kantún Can
Secretaries	PAN	Gustavo Sánchez Vásquez to 31 January 2026
Secretaries	PAN	Gina Gerardina Campuzano González from 24 February 2026
Secretaries	PVEM	Jasmine María Bugarín Rodríguez
Secretaries	PT	Lizeth Sánchez García
Secretaries	PRI	Claudia Edith Anaya Mota
Secretaries	MC	Néstor Camarillo Medina

==== 2026–2027 ====
Morena's caucus unanimously nominated Higinio Martínez Miranda on 30 August 2026, over the objections of Gerardo Fernández Noroña, who had sought the post. The plenary elected him president on 31 August 2026 with 116 of the 117 votes cast in a nominal ballot.

President	Morena	Higinio Martínez Miranda
Vice presidents	Morena	Verónica Camino Farjat
Vice presidents	PAN	Mauricio Vila Dosal
Vice presidents	PVEM	Jorge Carlos Ramírez Marín
Secretaries	Morena	María Martina Kantún Can
Secretaries	Morena	Alejandra Berenice Arias Trevilla
Secretaries	Morena	Simey Olvera Bautista
Secretaries	PAN	Gina Gerardina Campuzano González
Secretaries	PVEM	Juanita Guerra Mena
Secretaries	PT	Lizeth Sánchez García
Secretaries	PRI	Claudia Edith Anaya Mota
Secretaries	MC	Néstor Camarillo Medina

=== Chamber of Deputies Board of Directors ===
The Board of Directors (Mesa Directiva) is elected by the plenary and consists of a president, three vice presidencies and one secretaryship proposed by each parliamentary group; its members serve one year and may be re-elected. For the second and third years of a legislature the law requires the presidency to pass, in decreasing order, to the largest parliamentary groups that have not yet held it, and bars it from the group presiding the Political Coordination Board; it accordingly went from Morena to the PAN and then to the PVEM.

==== 2024–2025 ====
The Chamber elected its first Board of Directors at the constitutive session of 29 August 2024, choosing Ifigenia Martínez y Hernández (Morena) as president with 496 votes. Martínez y Hernández died in office on 5 October 2024; three days later the Chamber designated, by a unanimous 420 votes, First Vice President Sergio Gutiérrez Luna as substitute president, Dolores Padierna Luna as vice president and José Luis Montalvo Luna as secretary in place of Pedro Vázquez González, all three taking office the same day. Third Vice President María del Carmen Pinete Vargas died on 1 April 2025; María Luisa Mendoza Mondragón was elected with 394 votes on 22 April to complete the term.

President	Morena	Ifigenia Martínez y Hernández; 1 September – 5 October 2024
President	Morena	Sergio Gutiérrez Luna from 8 October 2024
Vice presidents	Morena	Sergio Gutiérrez Luna; 1 September – 8 October 2024
Vice presidents	Morena	Dolores Padierna Luna from 8 October 2024
Vice presidents	PAN	Kenia López Rabadán
Vice presidents	PVEM	María del Carmen Pinete Vargas; 1 September 2024 – 1 April 2025
Vice presidents	PVEM	María Luisa Mendoza Mondragón from 22 April 2025
Secretaries	Morena	Julieta Villalpando Riquelme
Secretaries	PAN	Alan Sahir Márquez Becerra
Secretaries	PVEM	Nayeli Arlen Fernández Cruz
Secretaries	PT	Pedro Vázquez González; 1 September – 8 October 2024
Secretaries	PT	José Luis Montalvo Luna from 8 October 2024
Secretaries	PRI	Fuensanta Guadalupe Guerrero Esquivel
Secretaries	MC	Laura Ballesteros Mancilla

==== 2025–2026 ====
The parliamentary groups failed to agree at the preparatory session of 31 August 2025, Morena having rejected the PAN's proposals for the presidency, and the outgoing board continued in office under the fallback provided by the law. Agreement was reached two days later: on 2 September 2025, Kenia López Rabadán (PAN) was elected president with 435 votes in favor and four against.

President	PAN	Kenia López Rabadán
Vice presidents	Morena	Sergio Gutiérrez Luna
Vice presidents	PAN	Paulina Rubio Fernández
Vice presidents	PVEM	Raúl Bolaños Cacho Cué
Secretaries	Morena	Julieta Villalpando Riquelme
Secretaries	PAN	Alan Sahir Márquez Becerra
Secretaries	PVEM	Nayeli Arlen Fernández Cruz
Secretaries	PT	Magdalena del Socorro Núñez Monreal
Secretaries	PRI	Fuensanta Guadalupe Guerrero Esquivel
Secretaries	MC	Laura Ballesteros Mancilla

==== 2026–2027 ====
At the preparatory session of 31 August 2026, the Chamber approved the composition of its final Board of Directors with 432 votes in favor, one against and ten abstentions, electing Raúl Bolaños Cacho Cué (PVEM) as president. It was the first time the board was elected using the electronic voting system rather than ballots deposited in an urn. The composition had been settled earlier the same day in a resolution signed by all six parliamentary coordinators.

President	PVEM	Raúl Bolaños Cacho Cué
Vice presidents	Morena	Sergio Gutiérrez Luna
Vice presidents	PAN	Annia Sarahí Gómez Cárdenas
Vice presidents	PVEM	Nayeli Arlen Fernández Cruz
Secretaries	Morena	Julieta Villalpando Riquelme
Secretaries	PAN	Diana Estefanía Gutiérrez Valtierra
Secretaries	PVEM	Felipe Miguel Delgado Carrillo
Secretaries	PT	Francisco Amadeo Espinosa Ramos
Secretaries	PRI	Fuensanta Guadalupe Guerrero Esquivel
Secretaries	MC	Laura Ballesteros Mancilla

== Senate members ==
=== Elected by state ===
In the list, the first two positions represent the senators from the winning two-name formula who secured a majority in the state. The third corresponds to the senator who earned a seat through first minority.

Aguascalientes
▌ Juan Antonio Martín del Campo (PAN)
▌ María de Jesús Díaz Marmolejo (PAN)
▌ Nora Ruvalcaba Gámez (MORENA)

Baja California
▌ Julieta Ramírez Padilla (MORENA)
▌ Armando Ayala Robles (MORENA)
▌ Gustavo Sánchez Vásquez (PAN) (Note: Sánchez Vásquez died in office on 31 January 2026. His alternate, García López, was sworn in on 10 February.)

▌ José Máximo García López (PAN)

Baja California Sur
▌ Lucía Trasviña Waldenrath (MORENA)
▌ Homero Davis Castro (MORENA)
▌ Susana Zatarain García (PAN)

Campeche
▌ María Martina Kantun Can (MORENA)
▌ Aníbal Ostoa Ortega (MORENA)
▌ Daniel Barreda Pavón (MC) (Note: In Campeche: Before the 2024 election, Eliseo Fernández Montufar's candidacy was revoked due to an active arrest warrant. Citizens' Movement's formula secured a seat through first minority, with his alternate, Daniel Barreda Pavón, becoming the senator-elect.)

Chiapas
▌ Sasil de León Villard (MORENA)
▌ José Manuel Cruz Castellanos (MORENA)
▌ Luis Armando Melgar Bravo (PVEM)

Chihuahua
▌ Andrea Chávez Treviño (MORENA)
▌ Juan Carlos Loera de la Rosa (MORENA)
▌ Mario Vázquez Robles (PAN)

Mexico City
▌ Omar García Harfuch (MORENA) (until 30 September 2024)

▌ Francisco Chíguil Figueroa (MORENA) (since 30 September 2024)

▌ Ernestina Godoy Ramos (MORENA) (until 30 September 2024)

▌ Karen Castrejón Trujillo (PVEM) (since 30 September 2024)

▌▌▌ Cynthia López Castro (MORENA) (Note: López Castro resigned her membership in the PRI on 29 October 2024 and joined MORENA two weeks later.)

Coahuila
▌ Luis Fernando Salazar Fernández (MORENA)
▌ Cecilia Guadiana Mandujano (MORENA)
▌ Miguel Ángel Riquelme Solís (PRI)

Colima
▌ Virgilio Mendoza Amezcua (PVEM)
▌ Ana Karen Hernández Aceves (PT)
▌ Mely Romero Celis (PRI)

Durango
▌ Alejandro González Yáñez (PT)
▌ Margarita Valdez Martínez (MORENA)
▌ Gina Campuzano González (PAN)

Guanajuato
▌ Ricardo Sheffield Padilla (MORENA)
▌ Virginia Magaña Fonseca (PVEM)
▌ Miguel Márquez Márquez (PAN)

Guerrero
▌ Beatriz Mojica Morga (MORENA)
▌ Félix Salgado Macedonio (MORENA)
▌ Manuel Añorve Baños (PRI)

Hidalgo
▌ Simey Olvera Bautista (MORENA)
▌ Cuauhtémoc Ochoa Fernández (MORENA)
▌ Carolina Viggiano Austria (PRI)

Jalisco
▌ Carlos Lomelí Bolaños (MORENA)
▌ Rocío Corona Nakamura (PVEM)
▌ Francisco Javier Ramírez Acuña (PAN)

Mexico
▌ Higinio Martínez Miranda (MORENA)
▌ Mariela Gutiérrez Escalante (MORENA)
▌ Enrique Vargas del Villar (PAN)

Michoacán
▌ Celeste Ascencio Ortega (MORENA)
▌ Raúl Morón Orozco (MORENA)
▌▌ Araceli Saucedo Reyes (MORENA) (Note: Saucedo Reyes was elected for the PRD as part of the Fuerza y Corazón por México coalition but switched allegiance to Morena on 28 August 2024.)

Morelos
▌ Víctor Mercado Salgado (MORENA)
▌ Juanita Guerra Mena (PVEM)
▌ Ángel García Yáñez (PRI)

Nayarit
▌ Jasmine Bugarín Rodríguez (PVEM)
▌ Pavel Jarero Velázquez (MORENA)
▌ Ivideliza Reyes Hernández (PAN)

Nuevo León
▌ Waldo Fernández González (PVEM)
▌ Blanca Judith Díaz Delgado (MORENA)
▌ Luis Donaldo Colosio Riojas (MC)

Oaxaca
▌ Antonino Morales Toledo (MORENA)
▌ Luisa Cortés García (MORENA)
▌ Laura Estrada Mauro (MORENA)

Puebla
▌ Ignacio Mier Velazco (MORENA)
▌ Lizeth Sánchez García (PT)
▌▌ Néstor Camarillo Medina (MC) (Note: Camarillo Medina switched allegiance from the PRI to MC on 27 August 2025.)

Querétaro
▌ Guadalupe Murguía Gutiérrez (PAN)
▌ Agustín Dorantes Lámbarri (PAN)
▌ Beatriz Robles Gutiérrez (MORENA)

Quintana Roo
▌ Anahí González Hernández (MORENA)
▌ Eugenio Segura Vázquez (MORENA)
▌ Mayuli Martínez Simón (PAN)

San Luis Potosí
▌ Ruth González Silva (PVEM)
▌ Gilberto Hernández Villafuerte (PVEM)
▌ Verónica Rodríguez Hernández (PAN)

Sinaloa
▌ Imelda Castro Castro (MORENA)
▌▌ Enrique Inzunza Cázarez (No party) (Note: Inzunza Cázarez resigned from Morena's Senate caucus to continue serving unaffiliated while under investigation.)
▌ Paloma Sánchez Ramos (PRI)

Sonora
▌ Lorenia Valles Sampedro (MORENA)
▌ Heriberto Aguilar Castillo (MORENA)
▌ Manlio Fabio Beltrones (No party) (Note: Fabio Beltrones was elected as part of the Institutional Revolutionary Party (PRI), but on 12 August 2024, before the start of the legislature, the party announced his exclusion from the PRI parliamentary group due to disagreements with the party leadership.)

Tabasco
▌ Alejandra Arias Trevilla (MORENA) (Note: In Tabasco: Rosalinda López Hernández, the senator-elect, died on 5 June 2024, before being sworn in. Her alternate, Alejandra Arias Trevilla, took her place.)
▌ Óscar Cantón Zetina (MORENA)
▌▌ José Sabino Herrera Dagdug (MORENA) (Note: Herrera Dagdug was elected for the PRD as part of the Fuerza y Corazón por México coalition but switched allegiance to Morena on 28 August 2024.)

Tamaulipas
▌ Olga Patricia Sosa Ruiz (MORENA)
▌ José Ramón Gómez Leal (MORENA)
▌ Imelda Sanmiguel Sánchez (PAN)

Tlaxcala
▌ José Antonio Álvarez Lima (MORENA)
▌ Ana Lilia Rivera (MORENA)
▌ Anabell Ávalos Zempoalteca (PRI)

Veracruz
▌ Claudia Tello Espinosa (MORENA) (until 20 November 2024)

▌ Raquel Bonilla Herrera (MORENA) (since 26 November 2024)

▌ Manuel Huerta Ladrón de Guevara (MORENA)
▌▌▌ Miguel Ángel Yunes Márquez (MORENA) (Note: On 10 September 2024, Yunes Márquez was granted a leave of absence on health grounds, and Miguel Ángel Yunes Linares was sworn in as his alternate. Later the same day, however, Yunes Márquez returned to his seat.) (Note: On 23 November 2024, the National Action Party (PAN) parliamentary group expelled Yunes Márquez due to his vote in favor of the 2024 Mexican judicial reform.) (Note: Yunes Márquez joined Morena on 18 February 2025.)

Yucatán
▌ Verónica Camino Farjat (MORENA)
▌ Jorge Carlos Ramírez Marín (PVEM)
▌ Rolando Zapata Bello (PRI)

Zacatecas
▌ Verónica Díaz Robles (MORENA)
▌ Saúl Monreal Ávila (MORENA)
▌ Claudia Anaya Mota (PRI)

=== Elected by proportional representation ===
▌ Marko Cortés (PAN)
▌ Karen Michel González Márquez (PAN)
▌ Ricardo Anaya Cortés (PAN)
▌ Lilly Téllez (PAN)
▌ Mauricio Vila Dosal (PAN)
▌ Laura Esquivel Torres (PAN)
▌ Alejandro Moreno (PRI)
▌ Karla Guadalupe Toledo Zamora (PRI)
▌ Pablo Angulo Briceño (PRI)
▌ Cristina Ruiz (PRI)
▌ Alberto Anaya (PT)

▌ Yeidckol Polevnsky (PT)
▌ Manuel Velasco (PVEM)
▌ Maki Esther Ortiz (PVEM)
▌ Luis Alfonso Silva Romo (PVEM)
▌ Clemente Castañeda (MC)
▌ Alejandra Barrales (MC)
▌ Amalia García (MC)
▌ Adán Augusto López (MORENA)
▌ Citlalli Hernández (MORENA) (until 30 September 2024)

▌ Guadalupe Chavira de la Rosa (MORENA) (since 30 September 2024)

▌ Alejandro Esquer Verdugo (MORENA)
▌ Susana Harp (MORENA)

▌ Gerardo Fernández Noroña (MORENA)
▌ Laura Itzel Castillo (MORENA)
▌ Marcelo Ebrard (MORENA) (until 5 September 2024)

▌ Emmanuel Reyes Carmona (MORENA) (since 5 September 2024)

▌ Martha Lucía Mícher (MORENA)
▌ Javier Corral Jurado (MORENA)
▌ Geovanna Bañuelos de la Torre (PT)
▌ Alfonso Cepeda Salas (MORENA)
▌ Karina Isabel Ruiz Ruiz (MORENA)
▌ Alejandro Murat (MORENA)
▌ Edith López Hernández (MORENA)

== Chamber of Deputies members ==
=== Elected by district ===
==== Aguascalientes ====
01 ▌ Humberto Ambriz Delgadillo (PRI)
02 ▌ Mónica Becerra Moreno (PAN)
03 ▌ Paulo Gonzalo Martínez López (PAN)

==== Baja California ====
01 ▌ Alma Laura Ruiz López (MORENA)
02 ▌ Nancy Guadalupe Sánchez Arredondo (MORENA)
03 ▌ Claudia Moreno Ramírez (MORENA)
04 ▌ Rocío López Gorosave (MORENA)
05 ▌ Evangelina Moreno Guerra (MORENA)
06 ▌ Gilberto Herrera Solórzano (MORENA)
07 ▌ Armando Fernández Samaniego (MORENA)
08 ▌ Fausto Gallardo García (PVEM)
09 ▌ Araceli Brown Figueredo (MORENA)

==== Baja California Sur ====
01 ▌▌ Manuel Cota Cárdenas (PVEM) (Note: Was among the eight deputies who switched from Morena to the Ecologist Green Party of Mexico on 1 September 2024.)
02 ▌ Luis Armando Díaz (PT)

==== Campeche ====
01 ▌ Elda Castillo Quintana (MORENA)
02 ▌ Gabriela Basto González (MORENA)

==== Chiapas ====
01 ▌ Carlos Morelos Rodríguez (PT)
02 ▌ Karina del Río Zenteno (MORENA)
03 ▌ Alfredo Vázquez Vázquez (MORENA)
04 ▌ Joaquín Zebadúa Alva (MORENA)
05 ▌ Emilio Ramón Ramírez Guzmán (MORENA)
06 ▌ Flor Esponda Torres (MORENA)
07 ▌ Azucena Arreola Trinidad (MORENA)
08 ▌ Roberto Albores Gleason (PT)
09 ▌ Guillermo Santiago Rodríguez (MORENA)
10 ▌▌ Deliamaría González Flandez (PVEM)
11 ▌ Rosario del Carmen Moreno Villatoro (MORENA)
12 ▌ Rosa Irene Urbina Castañeda (MORENA)
13 ▌ Jorge Villatoro Osorio (PVEM)

==== Chihuahua ====
01 ▌ Daniel Murguía Lardizábal (MORENA)
02 ▌ Maité Vargas Meraz (MORENA)
03 ▌ Lilia Aguilar Gil (PT)
04 ▌▌ Alejandro Pérez Cuéllar (PVEM)
05 ▌ Juan Antonio Meléndez Ortega (PRI)
06 ▌ María Angélica Granados Trespalacios (PAN)
07 ▌ Roberto Corral Ordóñez (PT)
08 ▌ Alejandro Domínguez Domínguez (PRI)
09 ▌ Noel Chávez Velázquez (PRI)

==== Mexico City ====
01 ▌ César Cravioto Romero (MORENA)
02 ▌ José Benavides Castañeda (PT)
03 ▌ Gabriela Jiménez Godoy (MORENA)
04 ▌ Dolores Padierna Luna (MORENA)
05 ▌ Carlos Ulloa Pérez (MORENA)
06 ▌ Daniel Campos Plancarte (MORENA)
07 ▌ Guillermo Rendón Gómez (MORENA)
08 ▌ Ana María Lomelí (PVEM)
09 ▌ Rigoberto Salgado Vázquez (MORENA)
10 ▌ Margarita Zavala (PAN)
11 ▌ Elena Segura Trejo (MORENA)
12 ▌▌ Mónica Elizabeth Sandoval Hernández (PRI) (Note: Following the loss of the Party of the Democratic Revolution's registration as a federal party, on 20 September 2024, Sandoval Hernández joined the Institutional Revolutionary Party.)
13 ▌ Francisco Javier Sánchez Cervantes (MORENA)
14 ▌ Carlos Hernández Mirón (MORENA)
15 ▌ Federico Döring Casar (PAN)
16 ▌ Carina Piceno Navarro (MORENA)
17 ▌ Carlos Arturo Madrazo Silva (PVEM)
18 ▌ Gabriel García Hernández (MORENA)
19 ▌ Héctor Saúl Téllez Hernández (PAN)
20 ▌ Ana Karina Rojo Pimentel (PT)
21 ▌ José Carlos Acosta Ruiz (MORENA)
22 ▌ Marisela Zúñiga Cerón (MORENA)

==== Coahuila ====
01 ▌ Brígido Moreno Hernández (PT)
02 ▌ Javier Borrego Adame (MORENA)
03 ▌▌ Theodoros Kalionchiz de la Fuente (PRI)
04 ▌ Yerico Abramo Masso (PRI)
05 ▌ Guillermo Anaya Llamas (PAN)
06 ▌ Cintia Cuevas Sánchez (MORENA)
07 ▌ Antonio Castro Villarreal (MORENA)
08 ▌▌ Hilda Magdalena Licerio Valdés (MORENA)

==== Colima ====
01 ▌ Leoncio Morán Sánchez (MORENA)
02 ▌ Gricelda Valencia de la Mora (MORENA)

==== Durango ====
01 ▌ Martha Olivia García Vidaña (MORENA)
02 ▌▌ Betzabé Martínez Arango (MORENA) (Note: Was among the three deputies who switched from the Labor Party to Morena on 19 September 2024.)
03 ▌ Gerardo Villarreal Solís (PVEM)
04 ▌ Patricia Jiménez Delgado (PAN)

==== Guanajuato ====
01 ▌ Luis Gerardo Sánchez Sánchez (PRI)
02 ▌ Alma Rosa de la Vega Vargas (MORENA)
03 ▌ Fernando Torres Graciano (PAN)
04 ▌ Francisco Javier Estrada Domínguez (MORENA)
05 ▌ Éctor Jaime Ramírez Barba (PAN)
06 ▌ Cristina Márquez Alcalá (PAN)
07 ▌ Diana Gutiérrez Valtierra (PAN)
08 ▌ Ernesto Prieto Gallardo (MORENA)
09 ▌ Diego Rodríguez Barroso (PAN)
10 ▌ Alejandro Calderón Díaz (MORENA)
11 ▌ Miguel Salim Alle (PAN)
12 ▌ Magdalena Rosales Cruz (MORENA)
13 ▌ Lucero Higareda Segura (MORENA)
14 ▌ Juana Acosta Trujillo (MORENA)
15 ▌ José Javier Aguirre Gallardo (MORENA)

==== Guerrero ====
01 ▌ Celeste Mora Eguiluz (MORENA)
02 ▌ Yoloczin Domínguez Serna (MORENA)
03 ▌ Ma. del Carmen Cabrera Lagunas (PVEM)
04 ▌ Javier Taja Ramírez (MORENA)
05 ▌ Gerardo Olivares Mejía (PT)
06 ▌ Carmen Nava García (PVEM)
07 ▌ Carlos Sánchez Barrios (MORENA)
08 ▌ Marco Antonio de la Mora Torreblanca (PVEM)

==== Hidalgo ====
01 ▌ Daniel Andrade Zurutuza (MORENA)
02 ▌ Yamile Salomón Durán (PVEM)
03 ▌ Tatiana Ángeles Moreno (MORENA)
04 ▌ Alma de la Vega Sánchez (MORENA)
05 ▌ Viridiana Cornejo Gómez (MORENA)
06 ▌ Ricardo Crespo Arroyo (MORENA)
07 ▌ Mirna Rubio Sánchez (MORENA)

==== Jalisco ====
01 ▌▌ Javier Guízar Macías (PT) (Note: Was among the five deputies who switched from Morena to the Labor Party on 19 September 2024.)
02 ▌ Tecutli Gómez Villalobos (MC)
03 ▌ José Mario Íñiguez Franco (PAN)
04 ▌▌ Raúl Álvarez Villaseñor (MORENA) (Note: Was among the six deputies who switched from the Ecologist Green Party of Mexico to Morena on 1 September 2024.)
05 ▌ Bruno Blancas Mercado (MORENA)
06 ▌ Beatriz Carranza Gómez (MORENA)
07 ▌ Claudia García Hernández (MORENA)
08 ▌ Paola Espinosa (PAN)
09 ▌ Favio Castellanos Polanco (MORENA)
10 ▌ Omar Borboa Becerra (PAN)
11 ▌ Merilyn Gómez Pozos (MORENA)
12 ▌ Sandra Beatriz González Pérez (MORENA)
13 ▌ José Luis Sánchez González (PT)
14 ▌ Marcela Michel López (MORENA)
15 ▌ Alonso Vázquez Jiménez (PAN)
16 ▌ Alberto Maldonado Chavarín (MORENA)
17 ▌ Antonio Ramírez Ramos (PVEM)
18 ▌ Haidyd Arreola López (MORENA)
19 ▌ Clara Cárdenas Galván (MORENA)
20 ▌ Katia Castillo Lozano (MORENA)

==== Mexico ====
01 ▌ María Luisa Mendoza Mondragón (PVEM)
02 ▌▌ Dionicia Vázquez García (MORENA)
03 ▌▌ Diana Castillo Gabino (PT)
04 ▌ Melva Carrasco Godínez (MORENA)
05 ▌ Patricia Galindo Alarcón (PT)
06 ▌ Julieta Villalpando Riquelme (MORENA)
07 ▌ Xóchitl Zagal Ramírez (MORENA)
08 ▌ Anay Beltrán Reyes (MORENA)
09 ▌▌ Iván Marín Rangel (PVEM)
10 ▌▌ Fernando Vilchis Contreras (PT)
11 ▌ Xóchitl Arzola Vargas (MORENA)
12 ▌ Armando Corona Arvizu (MORENA)
13 ▌ Alma Monserrat Córdoba Navarrete (MORENA)
14 ▌ Claudia Leticia Garfias Alcantára (MORENA)
15 ▌ Josefina Anaya Martínez (MORENA)
16 ▌ Emilio Manzanilla Téllez (PT)
17 ▌ Juan Hugo de la Rosa García (MORENA)
18 ▌ Claudia Sánchez Juárez (PVEM)
19 ▌ Gabriela Valdepeñas González (MORENA)
20 ▌ Monserrat Ruiz Páez (MORENA)
21 ▌ Iván Millán Contreras (MORENA)
22 ▌ Martha Moya Bastón (PAN)
23 ▌ José Luis Hernández Pérez (PVEM)
24 ▌ José Luis Durán Reveles (PVEM)
25 ▌ Leide Avilés Domínguez (MORENA)
26 ▌ Luis Miranda Barrera (PVEM)
27 ▌ Wblester Santiago Pineda (PT)
28 ▌ Roberto Ángel Domínguez Rodríguez (MORENA)
29 ▌ Gerardo Ulloa Pérez (MORENA)
30 ▌ César Agustín Hernández Pérez (MORENA)
31 ▌ Juan Ángel Bautista Bravo (MORENA)
32 ▌ Luis Enrique Martínez Ventura (PT)
33 ▌ Anaís Burgos Hernández (MORENA)
34 ▌ Mónica Álvarez Nemer (MORENA)
35 ▌ Arturo Roberto Hernández Tapia (MORENA)
36 ▌ Juan Carlos Varela Domínguez (MORENA)
37 ▌ Pedro Zenteno Santaella (MORENA)
38 ▌ Jesús Martín Cuanalo Araujo (PVEM)
39 ▌ José Luis Montalvo Luna (PT)
40 ▌ Azucena Huerta Romero (PVEM)

==== Michoacán ====
01 ▌ Leonel Godoy Rangel (MORENA)
02 ▌ José Luis Cruz Lucatero (MORENA)
03 ▌ Mary Carmen Bernal Martínez (PT)
04 ▌ Rosa Guadalupe Ortega Tiburcio (MORENA)
05 ▌ Miroslava Shember Domínguez (MORENA)
06 ▌ José Luis Téllez Marín (PT)
07 ▌ Marcela Velázquez Vázquez (MORENA)
08 ▌ Ernesto Núñez Aguilar (PVEM)
09 ▌ Guadalupe Mendoza Arias (Independent)
10 ▌ David Cortés Mendoza (PAN)
11 ▌ Vanessa López Carrillo (PT)

==== Morelos ====
01 ▌ Sandra Anaya Villegas (MORENA)
02 ▌ Ariadna Barrera Vázquez (MORENA)
03 ▌ Cindy Winkler Trujillo (PVEM)
04 ▌ Juan Ángel Flores Bustamante (MORENA)
05 ▌ Agustín Alonso Gutiérrez (MORENA)

==== Nayarit ====
01 ▌ Any Marilú Porras Baylón (MORENA)
02 ▌ Andrea Navarro Pérez (MORENA)
03 ▌ Jorge Armando Ortiz Rodriguez (PT)

==== Nuevo León ====
01 ▌ Homero Niño de Rivera Vela (PAN)
02 ▌ Andrés Cantú Ramírez (PRI)
03 ▌ Clara Luz Flores (MORENA)
04 ▌ Lilia Olivares Castañeda (PAN)
05 ▌ Santiago González Soto (PT)
06 ▌ Annia Gómez Cárdenas (PAN)
07 ▌ Carlos Alberto Guevara Garza (PVEM)
08 ▌ Adriana Quiroz Gallegos (MORENA)
09 ▌ Juan Francisco Espinoza Eguía (PRI)
10 ▌ Ana Isabel González González (PRI)
11 ▌ Pedro Garza Treviño (PAN)
12 ▌ Héctor de la Garza Villarreal (PVEM)
13 ▌ Luis Orlando Quiroga Treviño (PVEM)
14 ▌ José Gloria López (PT)

==== Oaxaca ====
01 ▌▌ Miriam Vázquez Ruiz (MORENA)
02 ▌ Irma Juan Carlos (MORENA)
03 ▌ Margarita García García (PT)
04 ▌ Naty Jiménez Vásquez (MORENA)
05 ▌ Carol Antonio Altamirano (MORENA)
06 ▌ José Alejandro López Sánchez (PT)
07 ▌ Gloria Sánchez López (MORENA)
08 ▌ Raúl Bolaños Cacho Cué (PVEM)
09 ▌ Carmen Bautista Peláez (MORENA)
10 ▌ Carmelo Cruz Mendoza (MORENA)

==== Puebla ====
01 ▌ Gissel Santander Soto (MORENA)
02 ▌ Fátima Cruz Peláez (PVEM)
03 ▌ María de los Ángeles Ballesteros García (MORENA)
04 ▌ Juan Antonio González Hernández (MORENA)
05 ▌ Vianey García Romero (MORENA)
06 ▌ Alejandro Carvajal Hidalgo (MORENA)
07 ▌ Claudia Rivera Vivanco (MORENA)
08 ▌ Ignacio Mier Bañuelos (MORENA)
09 ▌ José Antonio Gali López (PVEM)
10 ▌ Karina Pérez Popoca (MORENA)
11 ▌ José Antonio López Ruiz (PT)
12 ▌ Nora Merino Escamilla (PT)
13 ▌ Mario Miguel Carrillo Cubillas (MORENA)
14 ▌ Eduardo Castillo López (MORENA)
15 ▌ Rosario Orozco Caballero (MORENA)
16 ▌ Adolfo Alatriste Cantú (PVEM)

==== Querétaro ====
01 ▌ Gilberto Herrera Ruiz (MORENA)
02 ▌ Ricardo Astudillo Suárez (PVEM)
03 ▌ Lorena García Jimeno Alcocer (PAN)
04 ▌ Roberto Sosa Pichardo (PAN)
05 ▌▌ Mario Calzada Mercado (MC)
06 ▌ Luis Humberto Fernández Fuentes (MORENA)

==== Quintana Roo ====
01 ▌ Juan Luis Carrillo Soberanis (PVEM)
02 ▌ Elda Xix Euán (MORENA)
03 ▌ Humberto Aldana Navarro (MORENA)
04 ▌ Mildred Ávila Vera (MORENA)

==== San Luis Potosí ====
01 ▌ Aremy Velazco Bautista (MORENA)
02 ▌ José Luis Fernández Martínez (PVEM)
03 ▌ Óscar Bautista Villegas (PVEM)
04 ▌ Francisco Adrián Castillo Morales (MORENA)
05 ▌ David Azuara Zúñiga (PAN)
06 ▌ Juan Carlos Valladares Eichelmann (PVEM)
07 ▌ Briceyda García Antonio (MORENA)

==== Sinaloa ====
01 ▌ Graciela Domínguez Nava (MORENA)
02 ▌ Ana Elizabeth Ayala Leyva (MORENA)
03 ▌ Jesús Fernando García Hernández (PT)
04 ▌ Felicita Pompa Robles (MORENA)
05 ▌ Jesús Ibarra Ramos (MORENA)
06 ▌ Olegaria Carrazco Macías (MORENA)
07 ▌ Merary Villegas Sánchez (MORENA) (Note: Villegas Sánchez resigned her seat on 31 October 2024 to serve as her party's state president in Sinaloa and was replaced by her alternate, Flores Ojeda.)

▌ Danisa Magdalena Flores Ojeda (MORENA)

==== Sonora ====
01 ▌ Manuel Baldenebro Arredondo (MORENA)
02 ▌ Jesús Antonio Pujol Irastorza (MORENA)
03 ▌ Diana Karina Barreras Samaniego (PT)
04 ▌▌ Ramón Flores Robles (PT)
05 ▌ Jacobo Mendoza Ruiz (MORENA)
06 ▌▌ Anabel Acosta Islas (PVEM)
07 ▌ Alma Higuera Esquer (MORENA)

==== Tabasco ====
01 ▌ Julio Ernesto Gutiérrez Bocanegra (MORENA)
02 ▌ Iván Peña Vidal (MORENA)
03 ▌ Rosa Margarita Graniel Zenteno (MORENA)
04 ▌ Jaime Humberto Lastra Bastar (MORENA)
05 ▌ Beatriz Millánd Pérez (MORENA)
06 ▌ Tey Mollinedo Cano (MORENA)

==== Tamaulipas ====
01 ▌▌ Carlos Enrique Canturosas Villarreal (PVEM)
02 ▌ Claudia Hernández Sáenz (MORENA)
03 ▌▌ Casandra de los Santos Flores (PVEM)
04 ▌▌ Mario Alberto López Hernández (PVEM)
05 ▌ José Braña Mojica (PVEM)
06 ▌ Blanca Narro Panameño (MORENA)
07 ▌ Olga Juliana Elizondo Guerra (PT)
08 ▌ Jesús Nader Nasrallah (PAN)

==== Tlaxcala ====
01 ▌ Alejandro Aguilar López (PT)
02 ▌▌ Raymundo Vázquez Conchas (MORENA)
03 ▌ Irma Yordana Garay Loredo (PT)

==== Veracruz ====
01 ▌ María del Carmen Pinete Vargas (PVEM) (Note: Pinete Vargas died in office on 1 April 2025. Her alternate, Guzmán González, was sworn in on 9 April.)

▌ Denisse Guzmán González (PVEM)

02 ▌ Elizabeth Cervantes de la Cruz (MORENA)
03 ▌▌ Magaly Armenta Oliveros (MORENA)
04 ▌ María Josefina Gamboa Torales (PAN)
05 ▌ Francisco Javier Velázquez Vallejo (MORENA)
06 ▌ Jaime Humberto Pérez Bernabé (MORENA)
07 ▌ Mónica Herrera Villavicencio (MORENA)
08 ▌ Jorge Alberto Mier Acolt (MORENA)
09 ▌▌ Adrián González Naveda (PT)
10 ▌ Ana Miriam Ferráez Centeno (MORENA)
11 ▌ Roberto Ramos Alor (MORENA)
12 ▌ Rosa Hernández Espejo (MORENA)
13 ▌ Blanca Estela Hernández Rodríguez (PVEM)
14 ▌ Jessica Ramírez Cisneros (MORENA)
15 ▌ Corina Villegas Guarneros (MORENA)
16 ▌ Zenyazen Escobar García (MORENA)
17 ▌ Margarita Corro Mendoza (MORENA)
18 ▌ Benito Aguas Atlahua (PVEM) (Note: Aguas Atlahua was murdered in Zongolica, Veracruz, on 9 December 2024. His alternate, Puertos Chimalhua, was sworn in on 11 December.)

▌ Jonathan Puertos Chimalhua (PVEM)

19 ▌ Paola Tenorio Adame (MORENA)

==== Yucatán ====
01 ▌ Rocío Barrera Puc (MORENA)
02 ▌ Jorge Luis Sánchez Reyes (MORENA)
03 ▌ Óscar Brito Zapata (MORENA)
04 ▌ Isabel Rodríguez Heredia (PAN)
05 ▌ Jazmín Villanueva Moo (MORENA)
06 ▌ Jessica Saiden Quiroz (MORENA)

==== Zacatecas ====
01 ▌ Soledad Luévano Cantú (MORENA)
02 ▌▌ Julia Olguín Serna (MORENA)
03 ▌ Ulises Mejía Haro (MORENA)
04 ▌ Ana Luisa del Muro García (PT)

=== Elected by proportional representation ===
==== First electoral region ====
▌ César Damián Retes (PAN)
▌ Paulina Rubio Fernández (PAN)
▌ Agustín Rodríguez Torres (PAN)
▌ Rocío González Alonso (PAN)
▌ Francisco Pelayo Covarrubias (PAN)
▌ Verónica Pérez Herrera (PAN)
▌ Miguel Ángel Monraz Ibarra (PAN)
▌ Eva María Vásquez Hernández (PAN)
▌ Arturo Yáñez Cuéllar (PRI)
▌ Graciela Ortiz González (PRI)
▌ Mario Zamora Gastélum (PRI)
▌ Sylvana Beltrones Sánchez (PRI)
▌ Juan Moreno de Haro (PRI) (Note: Héctor Melesio Cuén Ojeda had been assigned a seat through proportional representation but was murdered on 25 July 2024, before the start of the legislature. His alternate, Juan Moreno de Haro, took his place.)
▌ Greicy Marian Durán Alarcón (PT)
▌ Amarante Gonzalo Gómez Alarcón (PT)
▌ Ana Erika Santana González (PVEM)
▌▌ Alejandra Chedraui Peralta (MORENA)
▌ Mayra Espino Suárez (PVEM)
▌ Patricia Mercado (MC)
▌ Hugo Luna Vázquez (MC)
▌ Claudia Salas Rodríguez (MC)
▌ Gustavo de Hoyos Walther (MC)
▌ Patricia Flores Elizondo (MC)
▌ Alfredo Lozoya Santillán (MC)
▌ Gloria Núñez Sánchez (MC)
▌ Pablo Vázquez Ahued (MC)
▌ Adasa Saray Vázquez (MORENA)
▌ Gilberto Daniel Castillo García (MORENA)
▌ Marina Vitela Rodríguez (MORENA) (Note: On 11 December 2024, the Chamber's plenary granted Vitela Rodríguez's request to vacate her seat as of 15 January 2025.)
▌ Hugo Eric Flores Cervantes (MORENA)
▌ Mayra Dolores Palomar González (MORENA)
▌ Pedro Haces Barba (MORENA)
▌ Dora Alicia Moreno Méndez (MORENA)
▌ Fernando Castro Trenti (MORENA)
▌ Nadia Yadira Sepúlveda García (MORENA)
▌ Carlos Alfonso Candelaria López (MORENA)
▌ Karina Isabel Martínez Montaño (MORENA)
▌ Carlos Palacios Rodríguez (MORENA)
▌ Giselle Arellano Ávila (MORENA)
▌ Armando Cabada Alvídrez (MORENA)

==== Fourth electoral region ====
▌ Kenia López Rabadán (PAN)
▌ Jorge Romero Herrera (PAN)
▌ Liliana Ortiz Pérez (PAN)
▌ Rodrigo Miranda Berumen (PAN)
▌ Genoveva Huerta Villegas (PAN)
▌ Adrián Martínez Terrazas (PAN)
▌▌ Mariana Jiménez Zamora (MC)
▌ Asael Hernández Cerón (PAN)
▌ Xitlalic Ceja García (PRI)
▌ Israel Betanzos Cortés (PRI)
▌ Nadia Navarro Acevedo (PRI)
▌ Carlos Gutiérrez Mancilla (PRI)
▌ Reginaldo Sandoval Flores (PT)
▌ Magdalena Núñez Monreal (PT)
▌ Felipe Miguel Delgado Carrillo (PVEM)
▌ Nayeli Fernández Cruz (PVEM)
▌ Ricardo Madrid Pérez (PVEM)
▌ Celia Esther Fonseca Galicia (PVEM)
▌ Claudia Ruiz Massieu Salinas (MC)
▌ Juan Ignacio Zavala Gutiérrez (MC)
▌ Amancay González Franco (MC)
▌ Gibran Ramírez Reyes (MC)
▌ Ifigenia Martínez y Hernández (MORENA) (until 5 October 2024)

▌ María Guadalupe Morales Rubio (MORENA) (since 14 October 2025)

▌ Cuauhtémoc Blanco (MORENA)
▌ Maiella Martha Gabriela Gómez Maldonado (MORENA)
▌ Arturo Olivares Cerda (MORENA)
▌ Julieta Kristal Vences Valencia (MORENA)
▌ Jaime Genaro López Vela (MORENA)
▌ Maribel Solache González (MORENA)
▌ Daniel Asaf Manjarrez (MORENA)
▌ Eunice Abigail Mendoza Ramírez (MORENA)
▌ Julio César Moreno Rivera (MORENA)
▌ Olga Sánchez Cordero (MORENA)
▌ Sergio Mayer (MORENA)
▌ María Teresa Ealy Diaz (MORENA)
▌ Carlos Castillo Pérez (MORENA)
▌ Mónica Fernández Cesar (MORENA)
▌ Jesús Valdés Peña (MORENA)
▌ María Rosete Sánchez (MORENA)
▌ Manuel Vázquez Arellano (MORENA)

==== Second electoral region ====
▌ César Verástegui Ostos (PAN)
▌ Nancy Olguín Díaz (PAN)
▌ Luis Enrique García López (PAN)
▌ Elizabeth Martínez Álvarez (PAN)
▌ Alan Sahir Márquez Becerra (PAN)
▌ Blanca Leticia Gutiérrez Garza (PAN)
▌ Víctor Pérez Díaz (PAN)
▌ Nubia Castillo Medina (PAN)
▌ Marcelo Torres Cofino (PAN)
▌ Noemí Luna Ayala (PAN)
▌ César Augusto Rendón García (PAN)
▌ Rubén Moreira Valdez (PRI)
▌ Marcela Guerra Castillo (PRI)
▌ Miguel Alonso Reyes (PRI)
▌ Verónica Martínez García (PRI)
▌▌ Erubiel Alonso Que (MC)
▌ Fuensanta Guerrero Esquivel (PRI)
▌ Olga Herrera Natividad (PT)
▌ Ricardo Mejía Berdeja (PT)
▌ Rosalía León Rosas (PT)
▌ Carlos Alberto Puente Salas (PVEM)
▌ Leonor Noyola Cervantes (PVEM)
▌ Omar Alejandro Acosta Ornelas (PVEM)
▌ Graciela Gaitán Díaz (PVEM)
▌ Iraís Reyes de la Torre (MC)
▌ Miguel Ángel Sánchez Rivera (MC)
▌ Paola Longoria (MC)
▌ Raúl Lozano Caballero (MC)
▌ Anayeli Muñoz Moreno (MC)
▌ Ricardo Monreal Ávila (MORENA)
▌ Antares Vázquez Alatorre (MORENA)
▌ Arturo Ávila Anaya (MORENA)
▌ Petra Romero Gómez (MORENA)
▌ Napoleón Gómez Urrutia (MORENA)
▌ Amalia López De La Cruz (MORENA)
▌ Jorge Mendoza Sánchez (MORENA)
▌ Olga Leticia Chávez Rojas (MORENA)
▌ Gabino Morales Mendoza (MORENA)
▌ Magda Erika Salgado Ponce (MORENA)
▌ Adrián Oseguera Kernion (MORENA)

==== Fifth electoral region ====
▌ Tania Palacios Kuri (PAN)
▌ José Manuel Hinojosa Pérez (PAN)
▌ Teresa Ginez Serrano (PAN)
▌ Germán Martínez Cázares (PAN)
▌ Ana María Balderas Trejo (PAN)
▌ Armando Tejeda Cid (PAN)
▌ Julia Licet Jiménez Angulo (PAN)
▌ Samuel Palma César (PRI)
▌ Leticia Barrera Maldonado (PRI)
▌ Hugo Eduardo Gutiérrez Arroyo (PRI)
▌ Abigaíl Arredondo Ramos (PRI)
▌ Emilio Suárez Licona (PRI)
▌ Ivonne Ruiz Moreno (PRI)
▌ Ofelia Socorro Jasso Nieto (PRI)
▌ María Isidra De La Luz Rivas (PT)
▌ Javier Vázquez Calixto (PT)
▌ Gabriela Benavides Cobos (PVEM)
▌ Eruviel Ávila Villegas (PVEM)
▌ Liliana Carbajal Méndez (PVEM)
▌ Héctor Pedroza Jiménez (PVEM)
▌ Gildardo Pérez Gabino (MC)
▌ Laura Ballesteros Mancilla (MC)
▌ Juan Ignacio Samperio Montaño (MC)
▌ Laura Hernández García (MC)
▌ Juan Armando Ruiz Hernández (MC)
▌ Catalina Diaz Vilchis (MORENA)
▌ Fernando Mendoza Arce (MORENA)
▌ María Damaris Silva Santiago (MORENA)
▌ Alfonso Ramírez Cuéllar (MORENA)
▌ Diana Isela López Orozco (MORENA)
▌ Víctor Hugo Lobo Román (MORENA)
▌ Roselia Suarez Montes De Oca (MORENA)
▌ Manuel Espino Barrientos (MORENA)
▌ Mónica Miriam Granillo Velazco (MORENA)
▌ Francisco Javier Cabiedes Uranga (MORENA)
▌ Mariana Benítez Tiburcio (MORENA)
▌ Vidal Llerenas Morales (MORENA)
▌ Rosalinda Savala Díaz (MORENA)
▌ Sergio Gutiérrez Luna (MORENA)
▌ Rufina Benítez Estrada (MORENA)

==== Third electoral region ====
▌ Julen Rementería del Puerto (PAN)
▌ Claudia Quiñones Garrido (PAN)
▌ Elías Lixa Abimerhi (PAN)
▌ Abril Ferreyro Rosado (PAN)
▌ Ernesto Sánchez Rodríguez (PAN)
▌ María del Rosario Guzmán Avilés (PAN)
▌ Lorena Piñón Rivera (PRI)
▌ Christian Castro Bello (PRI)
▌ Ariana Rejón Lara (PRI)
▌ Emilio Lara Calderón (PRI)
▌ Francisco Espinosa Ramos (PT)
▌ Maribel Martínez Ruiz (PT)
▌ Pedro Vázquez González (PT)
▌ Aracely Cruz Jiménez (PT)
▌ Julio Scherer Pareyón (PVEM)
▌ Karina Alejandra Trujillo Trujillo (PVEM)
▌ Javier Herrera Borunda (PVEM)
▌▌ Santy Montemayor Castillo (MORENA)
▌ Alejandro Avilés Álvarez (PVEM)
▌ Sergio Gil Rullan (MC)
▌ Ivonne Ortega Pacheco (MC)
▌▌ Francisco Farías Bailón (PVEM)
▌ María De Fátima García León (MC)
▌ Rosa María Castro Salinas (MORENA)
▌ Kenia Muñiz Cabrera (MORENA)
▌ Patricia Armendáriz (MORENA)
▌ Luis Arturo Oliver Cen (MORENA)
▌ Zayra Linette Fernández Sarabia (MORENA)
▌ Humberto Coss Y León Zúñiga (MORENA)
▌ Herminia López Santiago (MORENA)
▌ Aniceto Polanco Morales (MORENA)
▌ Sonia Rincón Chanona (MORENA)
▌ Aciel Sibaja Mendoza (MORENA)
▌ Rocío Abreu (MORENA)
▌ Venustiano Caamal Cocom (MORENA)
▌ Karen Yaiti Calcano Constantino (MORENA)
▌ Juan Carlos Natale (MORENA)
▌ Luz María Rodríguez Pérez (MORENA)
▌ Eleazar Guerrero Pérez (MORENA)
▌ Bertha Osorio Ferral (MORENA)

== See also ==
- 2024 Mexican general election
- 2024 Mexican Senate election
- 2024 Mexican Chamber of Deputies election
