= 2nd federal electoral district of Baja California =

Federal electoral district of Mexico

Baja California's 2nd
- Electoral district of the Chamber of Deputies of Mexico

Incumbent
- Member: Nancy Guadalupe Sánchez Arredondo
- Party: ▌Morena
- Congress: 66th (2024–2027)

District
- State: Baja California
- Head town: Mexicali
- Coordinates: 32°39′N 115°28′W
- Covers: Municipality of Mexicali (part)
- PR region: First
- Precincts: 229
- Population: 400,856 (2020 census)

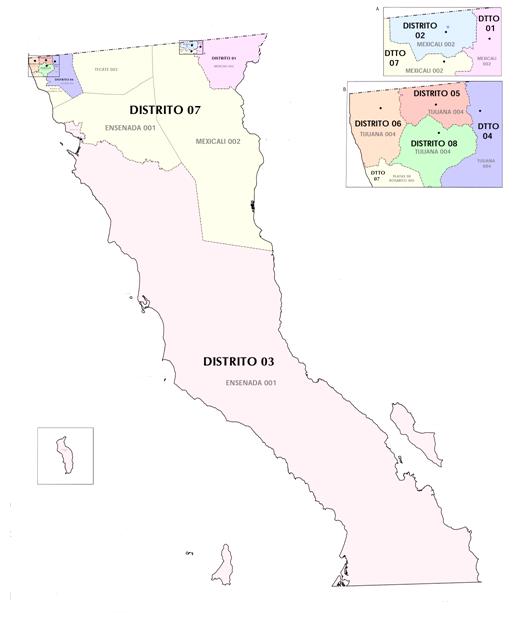
Baja California under the 2017–2022 districting scheme

Baja California's districts between 2005 and 2007

The 2nd federal electoral district of Baja California (Spanish: Distrito electoral federal 02 de Baja California) is one of the 300 electoral districts into which Mexico is divided for elections to the federal Chamber of Deputies and one of nine such districts in the state of Baja California.

It elects one deputy to the lower house of Congress for each three-year legislative session by means of the first-past-the-post system. Votes cast in the district also count towards the calculation of proportional representation ("plurinominal") deputies elected from the first region.

The current member for the district, elected in the 2024 general election, is Nancy Guadalupe Sánchez Arredondo of the National Regeneration Movement (Morena).

== District territory ==
Under the 2023 districting plan adopted by the National Electoral Institute (INE), which is to be used for the 2024, 2027 and 2030 federal elections, the second district covers 229 precincts (secciones electorales) in the western urban portion of the municipality of Mexicali. (Note: The 1st and 7th districts cover, respectively, the municipality's remaining urban and rural sectors.)

The head town (cabecera distrital), where results from individual polling stations are gathered together and tallied, is the state capital, the city of Mexicali. The district reported a population of 400,856 in the 2020 census.

== Previous districting schemes ==
Evolution of electoral district numbers
	1974	1978	1996	2005	2017	2023
Baja California	3	6	6	8	8	9
Chamber of Deputies	196	300				

2005–2017

Under the 2005 redistricting process, Baja California's 2nd district was made of the northeast portion of the municipality of Mexicali, including the eastern section of the homonymous city and other cities in the Mexicali Valley such as Los Algodones. The district's head town was the city of Mexicali.

1996–2005

Between 1996 and 2005, the district corresponded to the western portion of the city of Mexicali and was, at that time, the smallest of the state's electoral districts in terms of geographical area.

== Deputies returned to Congress ==
(Mexico) National parties
- Current
- PAN
- PRI
- PT
- PVEM
- MC
- Morena
- PAZ
- Somos
- Defunct or local only
- PLM
- PNR
- PRM
- PNM
- PP
- PPS
- PARM
- PFCRN
- CON
- PANAL
- PSD
- PES
- PES
- PRD

Baja California's 2nd district
Election	Deputy	Party	Term	Legislature
1976	Alfonso Ballesteros Pelayo	Institutional Revolutionary Party	1976–1979	50th Congress
1979	Juan Villalpando Cuevas	Institutional Revolutionary Party	1979–1982	51st Congress
1982	Martiníano Valdez Escobedo	Institutional Revolutionary Party	1982–1985	52nd Congress
1985	Rafael Sainz Moreno	Institutional Revolutionary Party	1985–1988	53rd Congress
1988	Bernardo Sánchez Ríos	Institutional Revolutionary Party	1988–1991	54th Congress
1991	José González Reyes	National Action Party (Mexico)	1991–1994	55th Congress
1994	Francisco Domínguez García	Institutional Revolutionary Party	1994–1997	56th Congress
1997	José Ricardo Fernández Candia	National Action Party (Mexico)	1997–2000	57th Congress
2000	Alfonso Sánchez Rodríguez	National Action Party (Mexico)	2000–2003	58th Congress
2003	Norberto Corella Torres	National Action Party (Mexico)	2003–2006	59th Congress
2006	Dolores Manuell-Gómez Angulo	National Action Party (Mexico)	2006–2009	60th Congress
2009	Francisco Javier Orduño Valdez	National Action Party (Mexico)	2009–2012	61st Congress
2012	María Fernanda Schroeder Verdugo	Institutional Revolutionary Party	2012–2015	62nd Congress
2015	Luz Argelia Paniagua Figueroa	National Action Party (Mexico)	2015–2018	63rd Congress
2018	Marina del Pilar Ávila Olmeda; Martha Lizeth Noriega Galaz	National Regeneration Movement	2018–2019; 2019–2021	64th Congress
2021	Julieta Ramírez Padilla	National Regeneration Movement	2021–2024	65th Congress
2024	Nancy Guadalupe Sánchez Arredondo	National Regeneration Movement	2024–2027	66th Congress

== Presidential elections ==
Baja California's 2nd district
Election	District won by	Party or coalition	%
2018	Andrés Manuel López Obrador	Juntos Haremos Historia	55.4134
2024	Claudia Sheinbaum Pardo	Sigamos Haciendo Historia	60.6785
