= Armando Ayala Robles =

Mexican politician (born 1976)

Senator of the Congress of the Union BAJA CALIFORNIA
- Incumbent
- Assumed office September 1, 2024 Serving with Gustavo Sánchez Vásquez Julieta Ramírez Padilla
- Preceded by: Alejandra León Gastélum

Armando Ayala Robles (born August 2, 1976) is a Mexican politician, and former radio personality currently serving as senator for Baja California. He formerly served as municipal president of Ensenada. Robles is currently a member of the National Regeneration Movement (Morena) party.
