= Senator Castillo =

Senator Castillo may refer to:

- Heberto Castillo (1928–1997), Senate of Mexico
- Laura Itzel Castillo (born 1957), Senate of Mexico
- Miguel Pereira Castillo (born 1947), Senate of Puerto Rico
- Susan Castillo (born 1951), Oregon State Senate
