= Jorge Carlos Ramírez Marín =

Mexican politician

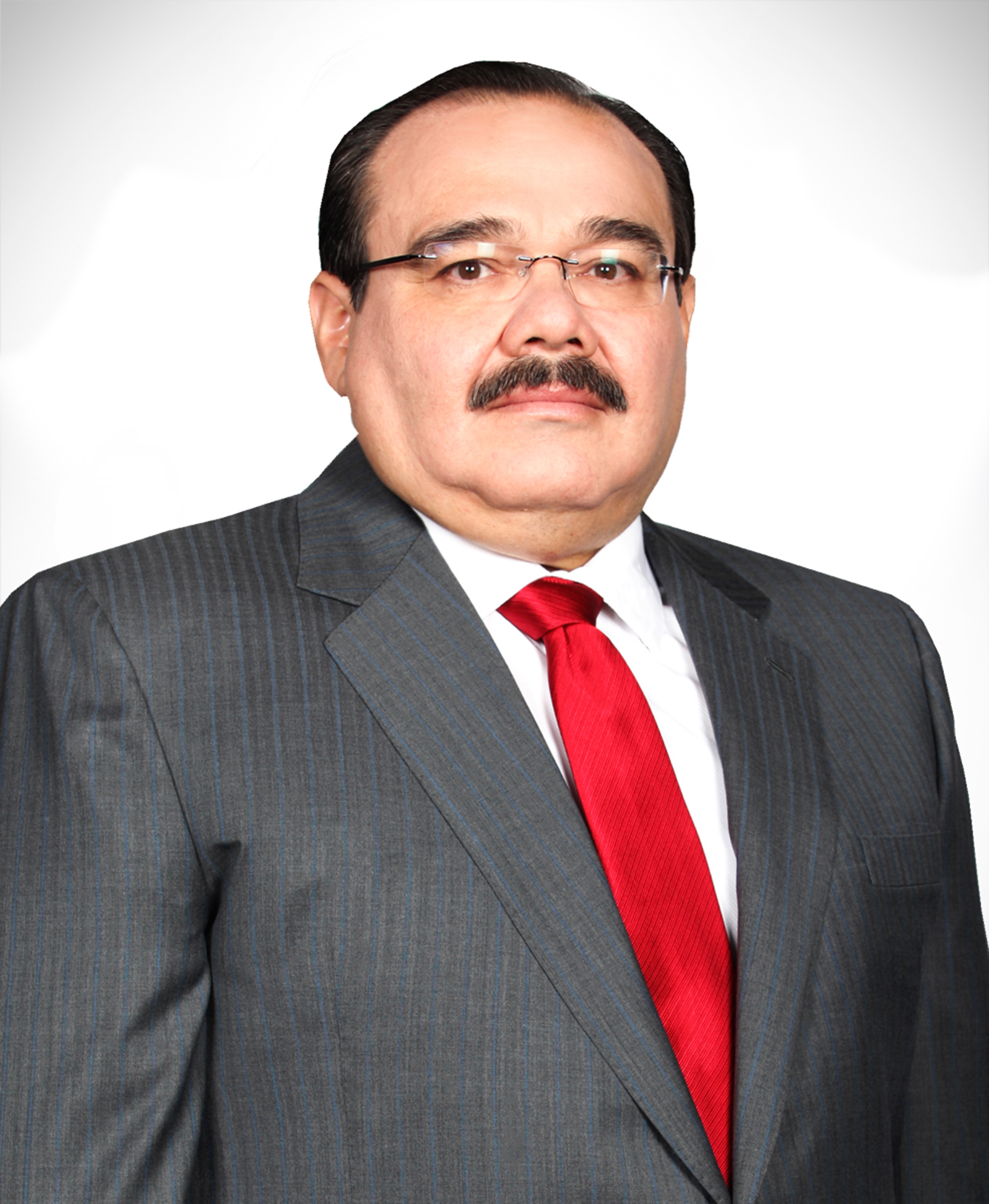

Member of the Senate of the Republic
- Incumbent
- Assumed office 1 September 2024
- Preceded by: Verónica Camino Farjat
- Constituency: Yucatán
- In office 1 September 2018 – 31 August 2024
- Preceded by: Daniel Ávila Ruiz
- Succeeded by: Verónica Camino Farjat
- Constituency: Yucatán

Secretary of Agrarian, Land and Urban Development
- In office 1 December 2012 – 27 February 2015
- President: Enrique Peña Nieto
- Preceded by: Abelardo Escobar Prieto
- Succeeded by: Jesús Murillo Karam

President of the Chamber of Deputies
- In office 7 September 2017 – 1 February 2018
- Preceded by: Guadalupe Murguía Gutiérrez
- Succeeded by: Edgar Romo García
- In office 5 September 2010 – 20 August 2011
- Preceded by: Francisco Javier Ramírez Acuña
- Succeeded by: Emilio Chuayffet
Other offices
Member of the Chamber of Deputies
In office 1 September 2015 – 16 June 2018
Succeeded by	Erubiel Alonso Que
Constituency	Third electoral region
In office 1 September 2009 – 31 August 2012
Constituency	Third electoral region
In office 1 September 2000 – 31 August 2003
Constituency	Third electoral region
Member of the Congress of Yucatán
In office 1 July 2004 – 30 June 2007
Constituency	Proportional representation
In office 1 July 1993 – 30 June 1995
Constituency	Proportional representation

Personal details
- Born: 14 August 1961 (age 64) Mérida, Yucatán, Mexico
- Party: Ecologist Green Party of Mexico (since 2023)
- Other political affiliations: Institutional Revolutionary Party (1979–2023)
- Education: Autonomous University of Yucatán (LLB)
- Profession: Politician
- Website: ramirezmarin.org

Jorge Carlos Ramírez Marín (born 14 August 1961) is a Mexican politician who was elected as a Senator for the state of Yucatán to the 64th Congress in the July 2018 general election as a member of the Institutional Revolutionary Party (PRI). He was re-elected to the Senate for Yucatán in the June 2024 general election for the Ecologist Green Party of Mexico (PVEM).

Ramírez Marín has also served as the federal Secretary of Agrarian, Land, and Urban Development from 2012 to 2015 and as a federal deputy in the 63rd and 64th Congresses, representing his home state of Yucatán and the third electoral region.

== Education ==
Jorge Carlos Ramirez Marin graduated in 1985 with a law degree from the Autonomous University of Yucatán (UADY). He also has a degree in Industrial Relations from the Monterrey Institute of Technology and Higher Education (ITESM) and in Parliamentary Law from the Change Foundation.

== Biography ==
Ramírez Marín was born on 14 August 1961 in Mérida, Yucatán, and was raised in the Santa Ana neighborhood. In 1979, he joined the PRI; in 1982, he began a 27-year career as the Director of Industrial Relations of Industria Salinera de Yucatán, S.A. de C.V.

His first experience as a legislator came in 1993, when he began the first of two terms in the Congress of Yucatán and served as the president of the Finance Commission. After his term ended, Ramírez Marín was tapped to head the PRI in Yucatán between 1996 and 1999; he was also the Chief Clerk of the Yucatán state government between 1998 and 2001. After making a failed bid in 1994, Ramírez Marín finally won a seat in the federal Chamber of Deputies in 2000. In the 58th Congress, he was the PRI's vice coordinator and sat on the Jurisdictional and Communications Commissions, as well as the Oversight Commission for the Superior Auditor of the Federation.

In 2004, Ramírez Marín served another term, this time three years, in the Yucatán state legislature. After he left, he became the president of the PRI's Institute of Training and Political Development. He left that post to become a federal deputy once more, this time in the 61st Congress. He was the president of the Board of Directors, the highest post in the legislature, and he sat on seven commissions: Jurisdictional, Finances and Public Credit, Constitutional Points, Rules and Parliamentary Practices, Science and Technology, Special on Expenses, and Oversight Commission for the Superior Auditor of the Federation. He also concurrently served as a representative of the government of Yucatán in Mexico City.

In 2012, after being a coordinator in the PRI presidential campaign and serving on President-elect Enrique Peña Nieto's transition team, Peña Nieto invited Ramírez Marín to join his cabinet as the first Secretary of Agricultural, Territorial and Urban Development (SEDATU). The aforementioned secretariat was created in the midst of a severe crisis in the housing industry; under Ramírez Marín, housing companies returned to financial stability within just two years. He left SEDATU on 27 February 2015, in order to pursue a candidacy as a PRI proportional representation deputy from the third region.

He is currently the vice coordinator of the PRI parliamentary groups in the Chamber of Deputies, a position that alternates with his duties as Representative of the PRI before the General Council of the National Electoral Institute (INE).

He was elected to the Senate for Yucatán in 2018. On 26 September 2023 he resigned his membership in the PRI and joined the Ecologist Green Party of Mexico (PVEM). He successfully sought re-election as one of Yucatán's senators in the 2024 Senate election, occupying the second place on the Sigamos Haciendo Historia coalition's two-name formula.

== Honours ==
- Grand Cordon of the Order of the Rising Sun (2025)
