= Laura Ballesteros Mancilla =

Mexican political scientist (born 1982)

Laura Iraís Ballesteros Mancilla (Santiago de Querétaro, Querétaro; August 19, 1982) is a Mexican political scientist and a member of the Citizens' Movement party. She participated in the commissions of mobility, sustainable transportation, and human rights.

She has a degree in Political Science from the Monterrey Institute of Technology and Higher Education (2004). She obtained a master's degree in Strategic Management and Innovation Management, specializing in Scenario Analysis from the Autonomous University of Barcelona and the Charles III University of Madrid (2008).

== Political career ==
She was elected Local Deputy for the National Action Party by relative majority in the VI Legislature of the Legislative Assembly of the Federal District from September 2012 to August 2015. She served as Secretary of the Human Rights Commission, in addition to being a member of the Mobility, Transportation, Indigenous Affairs, Jurisdictional and Administration Committee Commissions.

Laura Ballesteros was National and Regional Councilor of the National Action Party until her departure from that party in March 2015.

On 22 November 2023 she was sworn in as a senator to replace Xóchitl Gálvez Ruiz, who had resigned her seat to seek the presidency in the 2024 general election.

On 26 February 2024 she assumed the role of campaign coordinator for Jorge Máynez's presidential bid representing the Citizens' Movement. In that capacity, she suffered a broken ankle and required surgery in the San Pedro Garza García stage collapse on 22 May 2024.

== Transportation ==
Laura Ballesteros promoted issues such as the mobility law while she was a legislator in the VI legislature of the ALDF. In July 2015, she contributed to the first regulation of Uber and Cabify in the Federal District. She also participated in the construction of the New Traffic Regulation of the Federal District.
