= Laura Itzel Castillo =

Mexican architect and politician

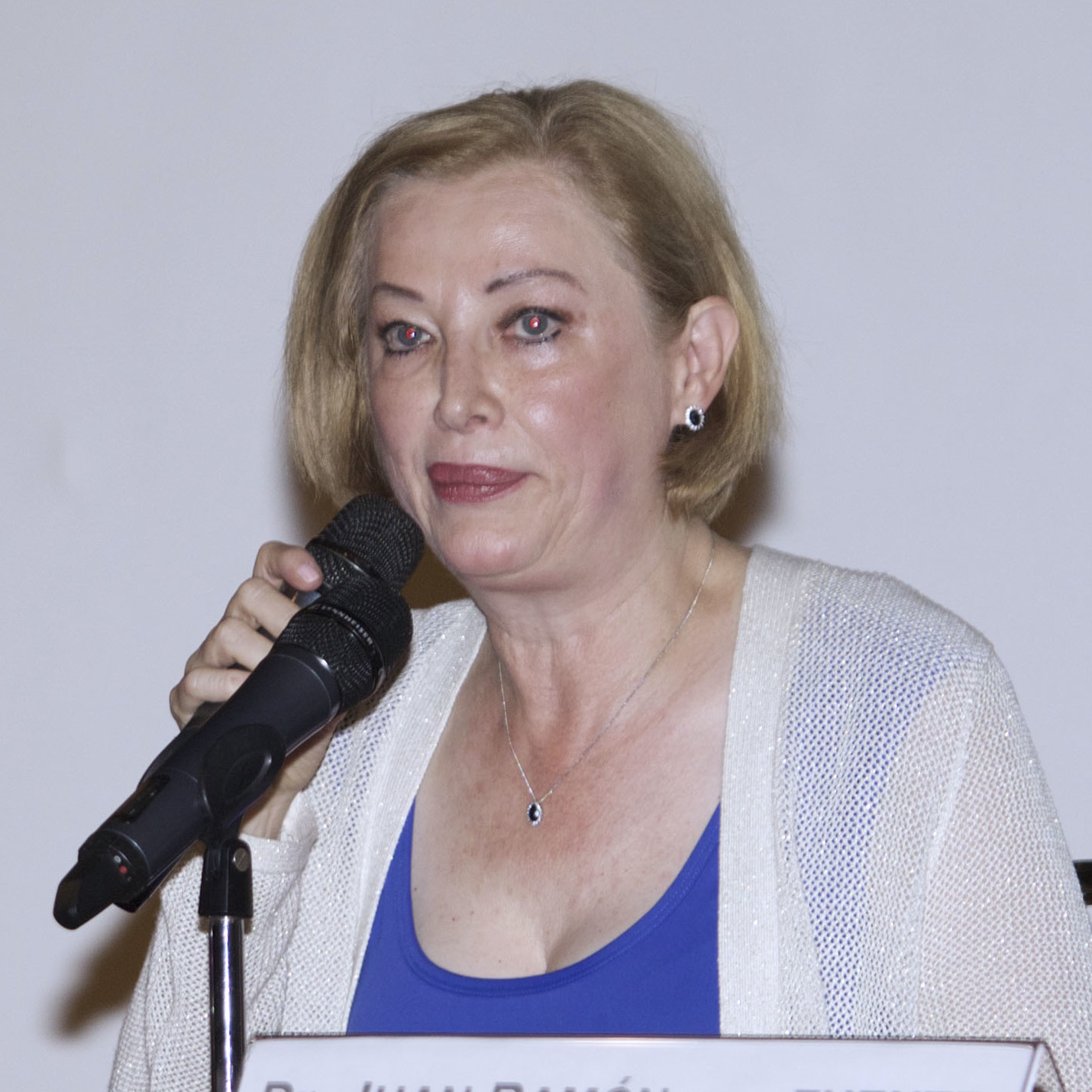
- Itzel Castillo in 2017

President of the Senate of the Republic
- In office 1 September 2025 – 31 August 2026
- Preceded by: Gerardo Fernández Noroña
- Succeeded by: Higinio Martínez

Member of the Senate of the Republic
- Incumbent
- Assumed office 1 September 2024
- Constituency: Proportional representation

Member of the Chamber of Deputies
- In office 1 September 2009 – 31 August 2012
- Constituency: Fourth electoral region
- In office 1 September 1997 – 25 September 1999
- Constituency: Fourth electoral region
Other offices
General Director of the Mexico City Passenger Transportation Network
In office 14 November 2015 – 4 December 2018
Head of Government	Miguel Ángel Mancera; José Ramón Amieva
Preceded by	Iliana Almazán Cantoral
Succeeded by	Ramón Jiménez López
Borough Chief of Coyoacán
In office 25 September 1999 – 30 September 2000
Appointed by	Cuauhtémoc Cárdenas
Preceded by	Arnoldo Martínez Verdugo
Succeeded by	María Rojo
Member of the Assembly of Representatives of the Federal District
In office 15 November 1991 – 14 November 1994
Constituency	Proportional representation

Personal details
- Born: Laura Itzel Castillo Juárez; 16 November 1957 (age 68) Mexico City, Mexico
- Party: Morena
- Other political affiliations: Labor Party; Party of the Democratic Revolution; Mexican Workers' Party
- Occupation: Architect and politician

Laura Itzel Castillo Juárez (Note: In this Mexican name, the surname is Castillo and the second or maternal family name is Juárez.) (born 16 November 1957) is a Mexican architect and politician. She has served in both chambers of the Congress of the Union and in the forerunner of the Congress of Mexico City.

== Biography ==
Laura Itzel Castillo was born in Mexico City into a political family: her father was the renowned leftist leader and engineer Heberto Castillo and her brother, Heberto Castillo Juárez, was the borough president of Coyoacán, Mexico City, from 2006 to 2009. She earned a degree in architecture from the National Autonomous University of Mexico (UNAM) in 1981.

Her political life began with the Mexican Workers' Party (PMT), founded by her father in 1974. The PMT, along with other left-wing parties, was later subsumed into the Party of the Democratic Revolution (PRD), created in 1989.

Castillo was elected to the first session of the Assembly of Representatives of the Federal District, the forerunner of the Congress of Mexico City, in 1991. In the 1997 mid-terms, she was elected to a plurinominal seat in the Chamber of Deputies for the duration of the 57th session of Congress (1997–2000), representing the PRD. She left her seat in Congress when she was appointed borough chief of Coyoacán in 1999–2000.

In 2000, she was appointed Secretary of Urban Development and Housing of the Federal District by the head of government, Andrés Manuel López Obrador, and remained in that position until 2005, when she resigned to join López Obrador's unsuccessful campaign for the presidency in the 2006 general election. When López Obrador formed the so-called legitimate government in 2006, he appointed her to the position of secretary of human settlements and housing. She left that position in 2009 to contend for her second term in the Chamber of Deputies: in the 2009 mid-terms she was elected to a plurinominal seat in the 61st congressional session (2009–2012) for the Labor Party (PT).

In the 2024 general election, she was elected to the Senate from the national list of the National Regeneration Movement (Morena). In August 2025 she was elected to serve as president of the Senate during the second year of the 66th Congress (2025–2026), replacing Gerardo Fernández Noroña. In August 2026, President Claudia Sheinbaum invited her to serve in her cabinet as secretary of women.
