= Dolores Manuell-Gómez Angulo =

Mexican politician

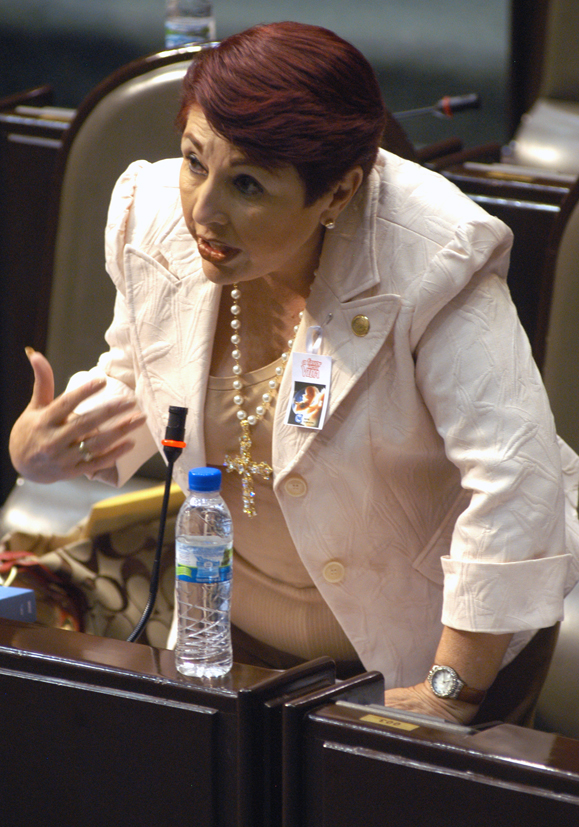
- Born: 17 June 1948 (age 78); Mexicali, Baja California, Mexico
- Occupation: Politician
- Political party: PAN

Dolores de María Manuell-Gómez Angulo (born 14 June 1948) is a Mexican politician affiliated with the National Action Party (PAN). In the 2006 election she was elected to the Chamber of Deputies for the 60th session of Congress, representing Baja California's second district. She had previously served as a local deputy in the 13th session of the Congress of Baja California.
