= Higinio Martínez =

Mexican politician (born 1956)

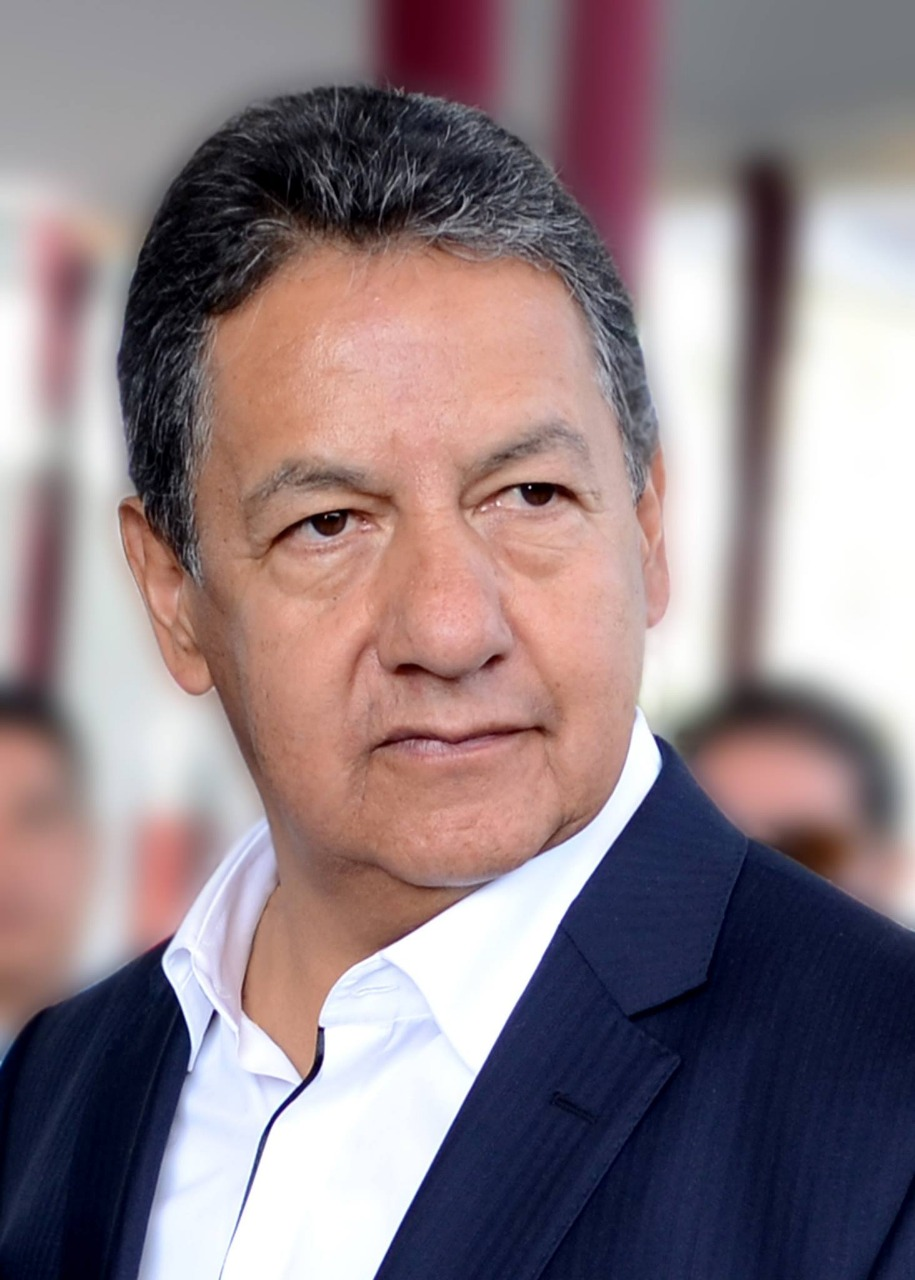

President of the Senate of the Republic
- Incumbent
- Assumed office 1 September 2026
- Preceded by: Laura Itzel Castillo

Member of the Senate of the Republic
- Incumbent
- Assumed office 1 September 2024
- Preceded by: Martha Guerrero Sánchez
- Constituency: State of Mexico (first formula)
- In office 1 September 2018 – 31 August 2024
- Preceded by: María Elena Barrera Tapia
- Succeeded by: Mariela Gutiérrez Escalante
- Constituency: State of Mexico (second formula)
- In office 1 November 1997 – 31 August 2000
- Constituency: National list
Other offices
Municipal President of Texcoco
In office 1 January 2016 – 16 January 2018
Preceded by	Nazario Gutiérrez Martínez
Succeeded by	Jesús Adán Gordo Ramírez
In office 18 August 2003 – 17 August 2006
Preceded by	Horacio Duarte Olivares
Succeeded by	Constanzo de la Vega Membrillo
Member of the Congress of the State of Mexico
In office 5 September 2012 – 27 February 2015
Succeeded by	Horacio Duarte Olivares
Constituency	Proportional representation
In office 5 September 2006 – 4 September 2009
Constituency	Proportional representation
In office 5 December 1990 – 4 December 1993
Constituency	Proportional representation

Personal details
- Born: Higinio Martínez Miranda; 18 June 1956 (age 70) Texcoco, State of Mexico, Mexico
- Party: National Regeneration Movement (since 2012)
- Other political affiliations: Party of the Democratic Revolution (1989–2011); Mexican Socialist Party (1987–1989); Mexican Workers' Party (1975–1987)
- Education: National Autonomous University of Mexico
- Occupation: Physician; Politician

Higinio Martínez Miranda (Note: In this Mexican name, the surname is Martínez and the second or maternal family name is Miranda.) (born 18 June 1956) is a Mexican physician and politician from the State of Mexico. He has served twice as municipal president of Texcoco, State of Mexico, and ran for governor of the state in 1999. He belonged to a succession of left-wing parties before joining the National Regeneration Movement (Morena) in 2012, and he has represented his state in the Senate since 2018 as a member of that party. In August 2026, he was elected president of the Senate for the 2026–2027 legislative session.

== Life and political career ==
Higinio Martínez Miranda was born in Texcoco on 18 June 1956. He studied medicine at the National Autonomous University of Mexico (UNAM) and was in private medical practice from 1986 to 1990. He was also chief of the medical service at Chapingo Autonomous University (UACh), which is based in Texcoco, from 1987 to 2000.

In 1975 he joined the Mexican Workers' Party (PMT) and, in 1987, was a founding member of the Mexican Socialist Party (PMS). He later joined the National Democratic Front (FDN) for the 1988 presidential election and, following its creation in 1989, the Party of the Democratic Revolution (PRD). In 2012 he joined the National Regeneration Movement (Morena).

In 1996, he ran unsuccessfully for the municipal presidency of Texcoco, but was elected to the Senate from the PRD's national list in the following year's mid-term election. In the state election of 4 July 1999, he competed for the governorship of the State of Mexico, representing a coalition between the PRD and the Labour Party (PT); he placed third with 22% of the vote, losing to Arturo Montiel of the Institutional Revolutionary Party (PRI).

Martínez has served three terms as local deputy in the Congress of the State of Mexico: 1990–1993, 2006–2009, and 2012–2015. He has also been elected municipal president of Texcoco twice: 2003–2006 under the banner of the PRD, and 2016–2018 as a member of Morena.

In the 2018 general election, he was elected to the Senate for Morena, occuplying the State of Mexico's second seat alongside Delfina Gómez Álvarez. During that six-year term in Congress, he served on the Senate's standing committees on communications and transport, national defence, and radio, television and cinema. Towards the end of their Senate terms, both Martínez and Gómez contended for Morena's nomination for the 2023 gubernatorial election in the State of Mexico; Gómez ultimately secured the nomination, with Martínez forming part of her campaign team, and she went on to win the governorship in the 4 June vote.

In 2024, Martínez was re-elected to the Senate, this time occupying the state's first seat. On 30 August 2026, he was elected president of the Senate for the third year of the 66th Congress, and succeeded Laura Itzel Castillo on 1 September.

== Family ==
Higinio Martínez Miranda is married to Virginia Mejía Castillo, with whom he has three children.
