= Alejandra Arias Trevilla =

Mexican politician (born 1984)

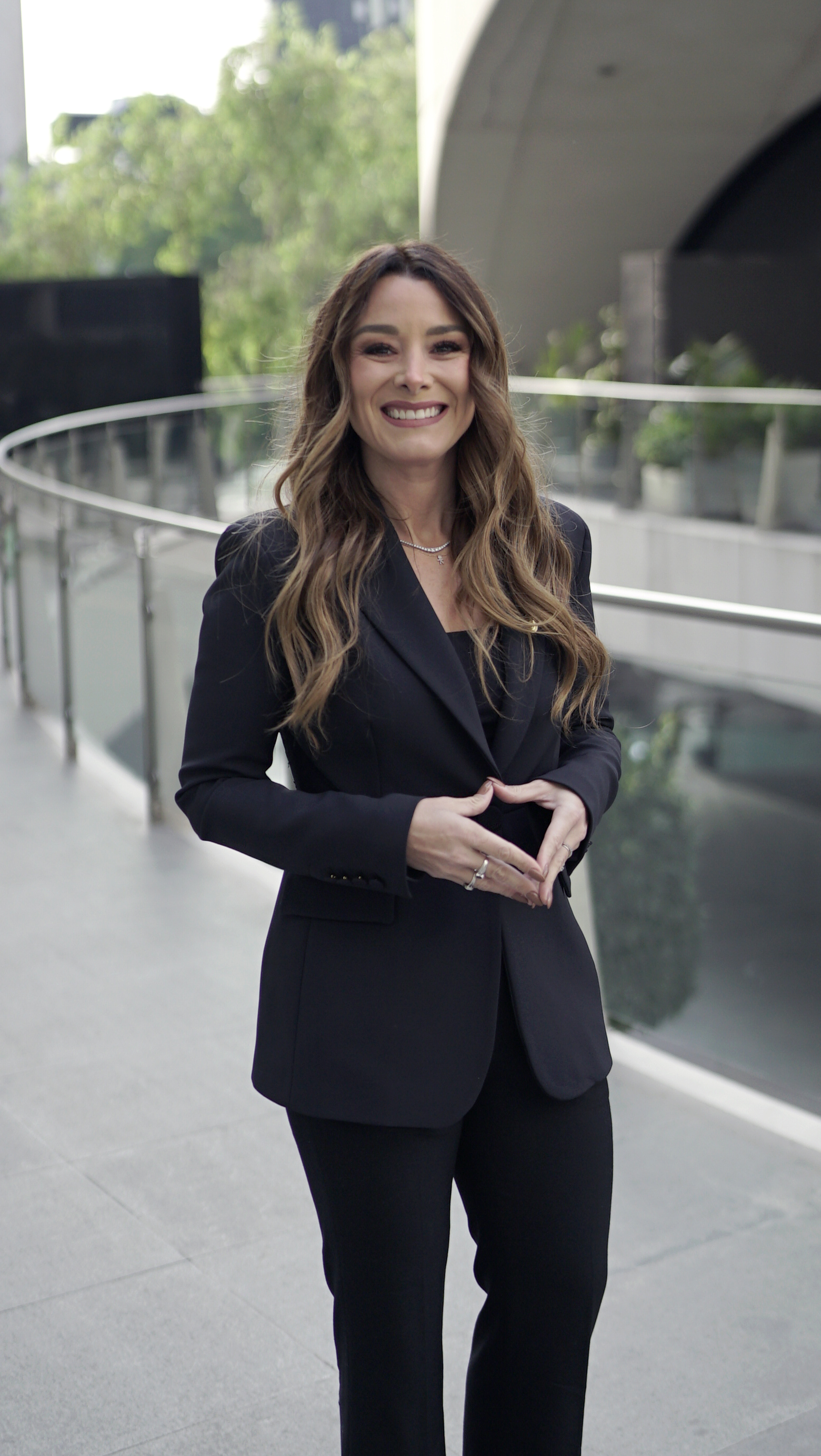

Senator of the Congress of the Union for Tabasco
- Incumbent
- Assumed office 29 August 2024

Personal details
- Born: 18 June 1984 (age 42)
- Party: MORENA
- Website: www.alejandraariastrevilla.com

Alejandra Berenice Arias Trevilla (born 18 June 1984) is a Mexican politician who has served as a senator of the Congress of the Union for Tabasco since 2024. She is a member of MORENA.
