= 9th federal electoral district of Baja California =

Federal electoral district of Mexico

Baja California's 9th
- Electoral district of the Chamber of Deputies of Mexico

Incumbent
- Member: Araceli Brown Figueredo
- Party: ▌Morena
- Congress: 66th (2024–2027)

District
- State: Baja California
- Head town: Tecate
- Coordinates: 32°34′N 116°38′W
- Covers: Municipalities of Tecate, Playas de Rosarito and Tijuana (part)
- PR region: First
- Precincts: 154
- Population: 433,965 (2020 census)

The 9th federal electoral district of Baja California (Spanish: Distrito electoral federal 09 de Baja California) is one of the 300 electoral districts into which Mexico is divided for elections to the federal Chamber of Deputies and one of nine such districts in the state of Baja California.

It elects one deputy to the lower house of Congress for each three-year legislative session by means of the first-past-the-post system. Votes cast in the district also count towards the calculation of proportional representation ("plurinominal") deputies elected from the first region.

The 9th district was created by the National Electoral Institute (INE) in its 2023 redistricting process on account of shifting demographics and was first contested in the 2024 general election. The first deputy elected from the district is Hilda Araceli Brown Figueredo of the National Regeneration Movement (Morena).

== District territory ==
Evolution of electoral district numbers
	1974	1978	1996	2005	2017	2023
Baja California	3	6	6	8	8	9
Chamber of Deputies	196	300				

The 9th district was created in the 2022 redistricting process, which is to be used for the 2024, 2027 and 2030 federal elections. It covers 47 precincts (secciones electorales) in the municipality of Tecate, 75 precincts in the municipality of Tijuana and 32 precincts in the municipality of Playas de Rosarito.

The head town (cabecera distrital), where results from individual polling stations are gathered together and tallied, is the city of Tecate. The district reported a population of 433,965 in the 2020 census.

== Deputies returned to Congress ==
(Mexico) National parties
- Current
- PAN
- PRI
- PT
- PVEM
- MC
- Morena
- PAZ
- Somos
- Defunct or local only
- PLM
- PNR
- PRM
- PNM
- PP
- PPS
- PARM
- PFCRN
- CON
- PANAL
- PSD
- PES
- PES
- PRD

Baja California's 9th district
Election	Deputy	Party	Term	Legislature
2024	Hilda Araceli Brown Figueredo	National Regeneration Movement	2024–2027	66th Congress

== Presidential elections ==
Baja California's 9th district
Election	District won by	Party or coalition	%
2024	Claudia Sheinbaum Pardo	Sigamos Haciendo Historia	74.5127
