= Verónica Camino Farjat =

Mexican politician (born 1983)

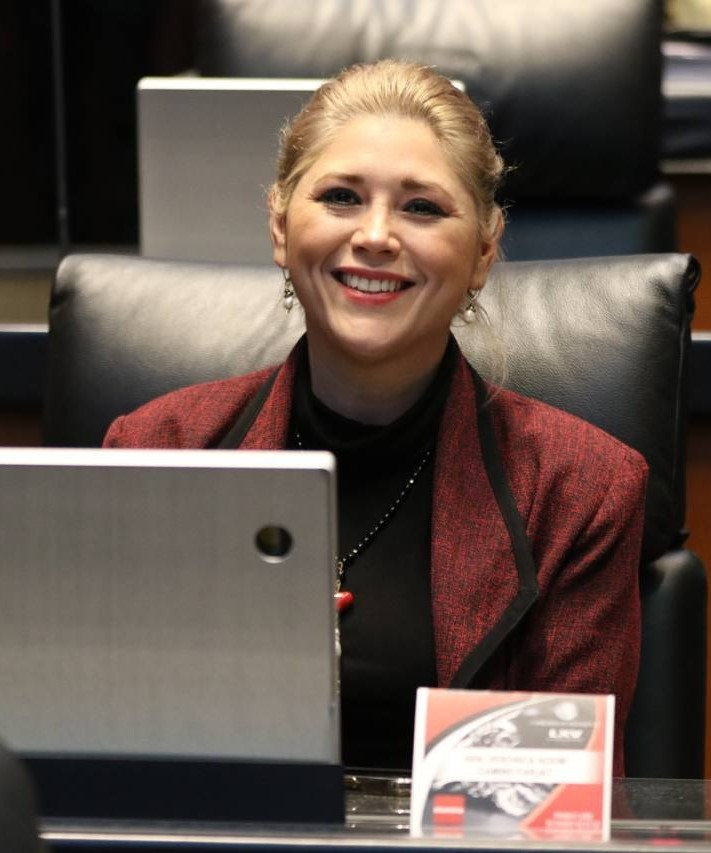
- Camino Farjat in 2022

Member of the Senate of the Republic
- Incumbent
- Assumed office 1 September 2018
- Constituency: Yucatán

Personal details
- Born: 19 November 1983 (age 42) Tizimín, Yucatán, Mexico
- Party: Morena (since 2021)

Verónica Noemí Camino Farjat (Note: In this Mexican name, the surname is Camino and the second or maternal family name is Farjat.) (born 19 November 1983) is a Mexican politician serving as a member of the Senate for Yucatán since 2018. From 2015 to 2018, she was a member of the Congress of Yucatán.
