= Norberto Enrique Corella =

Mexican politician

- Born: 8 August 1951 (age 74); El Paso Texas
- Education: BA in Political Science and Public Administration in Universidad Nacional Autonoma de Mexico.
- Occupation: Politician
- Political party: PAN

Norberto Enrique Corella Torres (born 8 August 1951) is a Mexican politician affiliated with the National Action Party. As of 2003 to 2006 he served as Deputy of the LIX Legislature of the Mexican Congress representing Baja California.
