= Enrique Inzunza =

Mexican politician

Senator for Sinaloa
- Incumbent
- Assumed office 1 September 2024

Personal details
- Born: Enrique Inzunza Cázarez; 28 June 1972 (age 54) Badiraguato, Sinaloa, Mexico
- Party: Independent (Note: Affiliated to the Morena party. Working independently as senator.)
- Spouse: Claudia Yuridia Meza Avendaño
- Occupation: Lawyer, politician

Enrique Inzunza Cázarez (born 28 June 1972) is a Mexican politician and lawyer. A member of Morena, he has served as Senator for Sinaloa since 2024.

In April 2026, the United States District Court for the Southern District of New York informed that Inzunza and nine other officials were under investigation for alleged ties with criminal organizations in Mexico. Inzunza rejected the claims describing them as libelous. In August 2026, Inzunza left his political party's caucus and will continue to serve as a senator as an independent.
