= Paulina Rubio Fernández =

Mexican politician (born 1983)

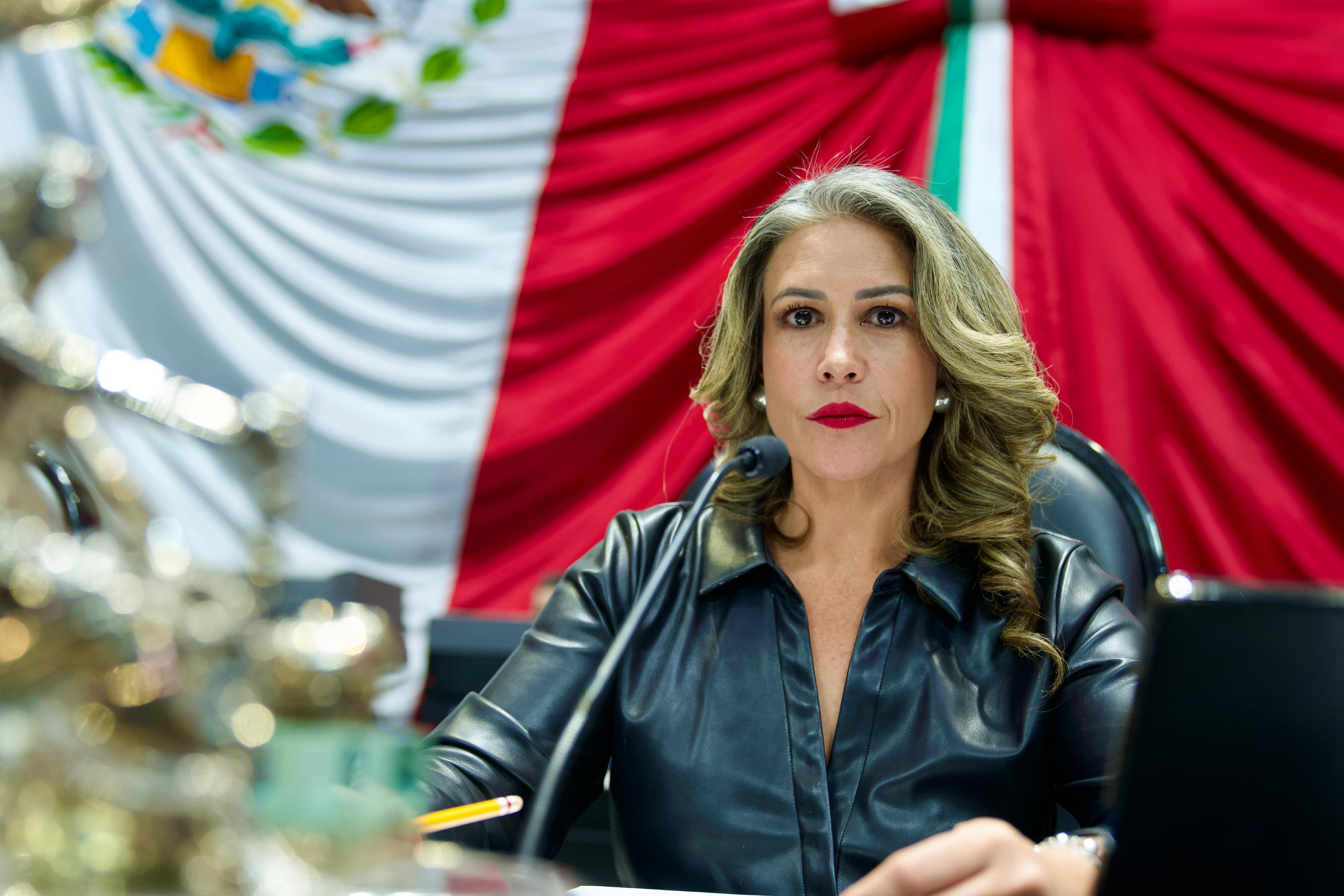

Member of the Chamber of Deputies
- Incumbent
- Assumed office 1 September 2021
- Constituency: First electoral region

Personal details
- Born: 15 January 1983 (age 43) Ciudad Valles, San Luis Potosí, Mexico
- Party: National Action Party

Paulina Rubio Fernández (Note: In this Hispanic American name, the first or paternal surname is Rubio and the second or maternal family name is Fernández.) (born 15 January 1983) is a Mexican politician serving as a plurinominal member of the Chamber of Deputies since 2021. She has served as second vice president of the Chamber since 2025.

Rubio Fernández was born in Ciudad Valles, San Luis Potosí, and is a member of the National Action Party (PAN). She holds a licentiate from ITESO, Universidad Jesuita de Guadalajara, and master's degree from the University of Guadalajara.
