= Cynthia López Castro =

Mexican politician (born 1987)

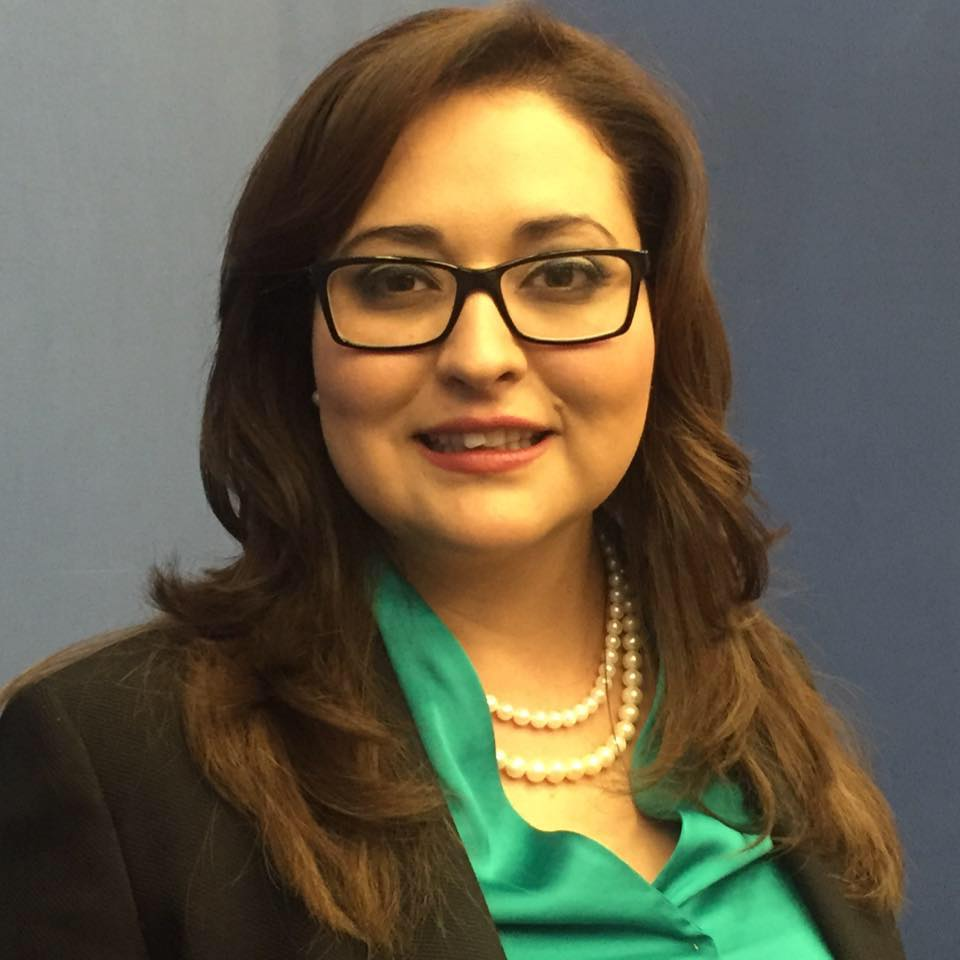
López Castro in 2015

Cynthia Iliana López Castro (born 18 February 1987) is a Mexican politician formerly affiliated with the Institutional Revolutionary Party (PRI) and currently aligned with the National Regeneration Movement (MORENA).

She was elected to the Legislative Assembly of the Federal District in 2015 and served as one of the assembly's vice-presidents during her term in office. In 2016–2017 she was also a member of the Constituent Assembly of Mexico City.

From 2018 to 2021 she served as a plurinominal deputy in the 64th Congress representing the fourth electoral region, which includes her birthplace in Mexico City. She was re-elected to the same position in 2021 for the 65th Congress.

López Castro won election as one of Mexico City's senators in the 2024 Senate election, occupying the first place on the Fuerza y Corazón por México coalition's two-name formula. On 29 October she resigned her membership in the PRI because of "differences with the party's current leadership", stating that she would remain in the Senate as an independent. Two weeks later, she joined MORENA, securing the ruling party's coalition a supermajority in the Senate.
