= María Fernanda Schroeder =

Mexican politician

- Born: 9 September 1958 (age 67); Mexicali, Baja California, Mexico
- Occupation: Deputy
- Political party: PRI

María Fernanda Schroeder Verdugo (born 9 September 1958) is a Mexican politician affiliated with the PRI. As of 2013 she served as Deputy of the LXII Legislature of the Mexican Congress representing Baja California.
