= Francisco Javier Orduño Valdez =

Mexican politician

- Born: 8 January 1955 (age 71); Baja California, Mexico
- Occupation: Politician
- Political party: PAN

Francisco Javier Orduño Valdez (born 8 January 1955) is a Mexican politician from the National Action Party. From 2009 to 2012 he served as Deputy of the LXI Legislature of the Mexican Congress representing Baja California.
