= Julieta Ramírez (politician) =

Mexican politician (born 1995)

Member of the Senate of the Republic
- Incumbent
- Assumed office 1 September 2024
- Constituency: Baja California

Personal details
- Born: 2 March 1995 (age 31)
- Party: Morena (since 2019) PAN (2014-2018)

Julieta Andrea Ramírez Padilla (born 2 March 1995) is a Mexican politician affiliated with the National Regeneration Movement (Morena). In the 2024 general election, she was elected to the Senate for the state of Baja California (first seat). From 2021 to 2024, she was a member of the Chamber of Deputies for Baja California's 2nd district (Mexicali).

In 2026, Morena announced her as the "state coordinator for the defense of the transformation and national sovereignty", a position expected to represent the party in the Baja California gubernatorial election of 6 June 2027.
