= Senate of the Republic (Mexico) =

Upper house of the Congress of the Union

Coordinates: 19°26′11.57″N 99°8′19.37″W

Senate of the Republic Senado de la República
- LXVI Legislature

Type
- Type: Upper house of the Congress of Mexico
- Term limits: Renewable once consecutively

History
- Founded: 4 October 1824

Leadership
- President of the Senate: Higinio Martínez Miranda (Morena) since 1 September 2026

Structure
- Seats: 128
- Political groups: Government (87): Morena (66); PVEM (14); PT (6); No party (1); Opposition (41): PAN (21); PRI (13); MC (6); No party (1)
- Length of term: 6 years
- Authority: Chapter II of the Constitution of the United Mexican States

Elections
- Voting system: Limited voting
- Last election: 2 June 2024
- Next election: 2 June 2030

Motto
- La patria es primero (The Homeland Is First)

Meeting place
- Senate Tribune; Senate Building; Mexico City, Mexico

Website
- senado.gob.mx

Rules
- Reglamento del Senado de la República (Spanish)

The Senate of the Republic (Spanish: Senado de la República), constitutionally the Chamber of Senators of the Honorable Congress of the Union (Spanish: Cámara de Senadores del H. Congreso de la Unión), is the upper house of Mexico's bicameral Congress. It currently consists of 128 members, who serve six-year terms.

== History ==
A bicameral legislature, including the Senate, was established on 4 October 1824. The Senate was abolished on 7 September 1857 and re-established on 13 November 1874. Under the regime of Porfirio Díaz (the Porfiriato: 1876–1910), many seats were given to elites and wealthy people loyal to the regime. During the Mexican Revolution, notably during the brief presidency of Francisco I. Madero, the Senate was left intact with Porfirian sympathizers, who blocked the president's attempts to pass reforms for the Revolution.

== Composition ==
After a series of reforms during the 1990s, the Senate consists of 128 senators:

- Two for each of the 32 states, (Note: Mexico City counts as a state for these purposes) elected under the principle of relative majority.
- One for each of the 32 states, assigned under the principle of first minority (i.e., awarded to the party or coalition with the second highest number of votes in the state).
- Thirty-two national senators-at-large, divided among the parties that received at least 3% of the vote in proportion to their share of the national vote.

In a senatorial race, each party or coalition nominates two candidates who run and are elected together by direct vote. The party or coalition of the two candidates that won the second highest vote within the state then assigns a senator to occupy the third seat (first minority seat), according to the list of candidates that the party or coalition registered with the Instituto Nacional Electoral (INE).

Senators serve six-year terms, running concurrently with the president of Mexico's sexenio. Special elections are rare, as substitutes are chosen at every election. Until 2018, the Senate was completely renewed every six years since senators were barred from immediate reelection, but they can now serve a second term.

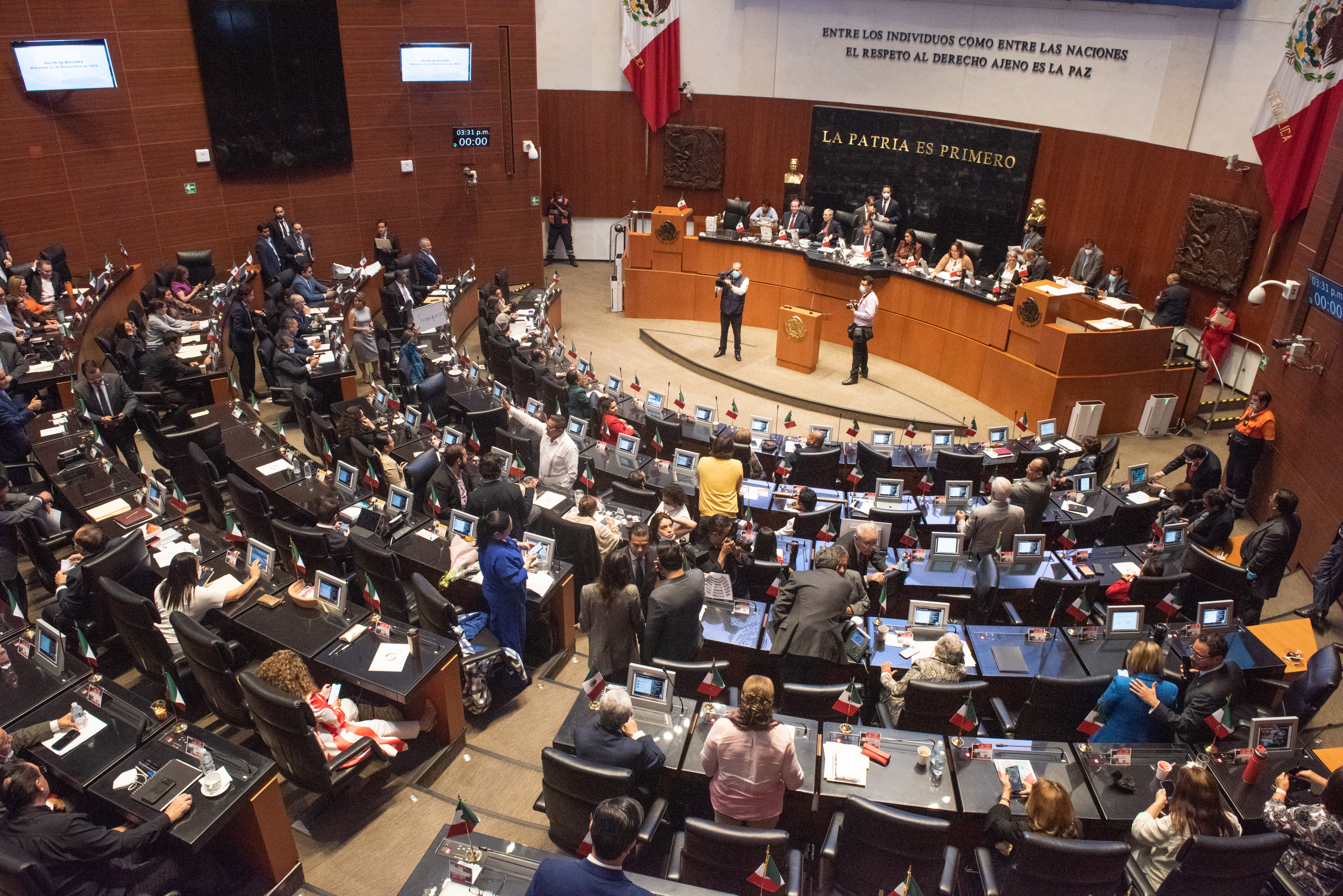
The session hall of the Chamber of Senators of Congress of the Union of Mexico.

The current composition of the Senate is as follows:

| Party | Relative majority | First minority | At-large | Total |
|---|---|---|---|---|
| Morena | 46 | 7 | 13 | 66 |
| PAN | 4 | 11 | 6 | 21 |
| PVEM | 10 | 1 | 3 | 14 |
| PRI | − | 9 | 4 | 13 |
| PT | 3 | − | 3 | 6 |
| MC | − | 3 | 3 | 6 |
| No party | 1 | 1 | − | 2 |

== Term ==
In Spanish, it is conventional to refer to each legislature by the Roman numeral of its term. The current session (from 2024 to 2027) is the LXVI Legislatura (66th Legislature).

Senators are elected to serve during two legislatures, while members of the Chamber of Deputies serve only one. Thus, current senators (elected in the general election of 2 June 2024) serve during the 66th and 67th Legislatures.

=== Legislatures ===
A senator holds office for six years for which they were elected (from 1 September of the year of the election to 31 August six years later), divided into two legislatures of three years each.

The LXVI Legislature was installed on 1 September 2024, and its term will end on 31 August 2027. Senators were elected to office in the 2024 election for six years and have been in office since 1 September of that year; therefore, they will hold office during both the LXVI Legislature and the LXVII Legislature.

== Election of senators ==
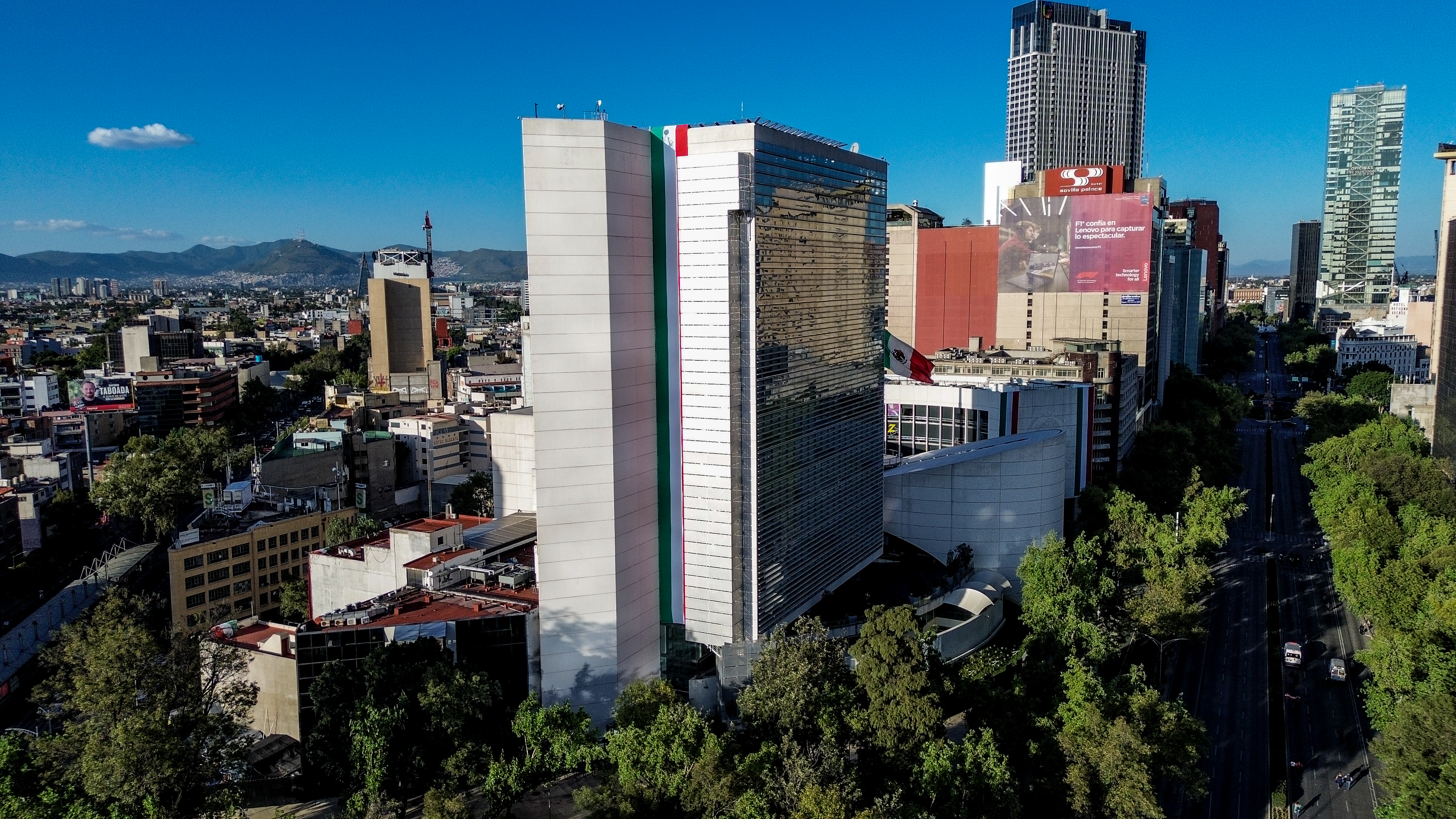
Current building of the Senate of Mexico in Paseo de la Reforma, Mexico City

=== Eligibility requirements ===
According to the Constitution, senators are the representatives of the nation. Election to the Senate, by any of the mechanisms available, requires the candidate to meet the following requirements:

- Be a Mexican citizen by birth, fully exercising their rights.
- Be twenty-five years old on election day.
- Be a native of the state where the election is held or a resident with an effective residence of more than six months before the election date.
- Not be on active duty in the military or have control of the police or rural gendarmerie at least ninety days before the election.
- Not be a secretary or undersecretary of state unless the office is definitively resigned at least ninety days before the election.
- Not be Minister of the Supreme Court unless the office is definitively resigned three years before the election.
- Not be a minister of religion.

=== Election process ===
Senators are elected for a six-year term, corresponding to two legislatures, and can be reelected only once for the immediate period.

They are elected in two ways: 96 in 32 three-seat constituencies based on the country's states and 32 in a nationwide constituency by proportional representation. In the three-seat constituencies, two seats are allocated to the party receiving the most votes (mayoría relativa) and one seat to the party receiving the second-highest votes (primera minoría).

== Last election ==
| Party or alliance | | Constituency | | | Party-list | | | Total seats | +/– |
| Party or alliance | | Votes | % | Seats | Votes | % | Seats | Total seats | +/– |
|---|---|---|---|---|---|---|---|---|---|
| Sigamos Haciendo Historia | National Regeneration Movement | 7,526,453 | 13.19 | 21 | 24,484,943 | 42.48 | 14 | 60 | +5 |
| Sigamos Haciendo Historia | Ecologist Green Party of Mexico | 2,298,726 | 4.03 | 4 | 5,357,959 | 9.30 | 3 | 14 | +8 |
| Sigamos Haciendo Historia | Labor Party | 1,215,172 | 2.13 | 0 | 3,214,708 | 5.58 | 2 | 9 | +3 |
| Sigamos Haciendo Historia | Common candidates (Note: Of the elected candidates, 25 belong to the National Regeneration Movement, 7 to the Ecologist Green Party of Mexico, and 7 to the Labor Party.) | 21,731,737 | 38.08 | 39 | | | | – | – |
| Sigamos Haciendo Historia | Total | 32,772,088 | 57.43 | 64 | 33,057,610 | 57.36 | 19 | 83 | +14 |
| Fuerza y Corazón por México | National Action Party | 1,148,920 | 2.01 | 1 | 10,107,537 | 17.54 | 6 | 22 | –1 |
| Fuerza y Corazón por México | Institutional Revolutionary Party | 316,636 | 0.55 | 0 | 6,530,305 | 11.33 | 4 | 16 | +2 |
| Fuerza y Corazón por México | Party of the Democratic Revolution | 76,082 | 0.13 | 0 | 1,363,012 | 2.36 | 0 | 2 | –6 |
| Fuerza y Corazón por México | Common candidates (Note: Of the elected candidates, 15 belong to the National Action Party, 12 to the Institutional Revolutionary Party, and 2 to the Party of the Democratic Revolution.) | 16,244,373 | 28.47 | 29 | | | | – | – |
| Fuerza y Corazón por México | Total | 17,786,011 | 31.17 | 30 | 18,000,854 | 31.23 | 10 | 40 | +2 |
| Citizens' Movement | | 6,460,220 | 11.32 | 2 | 6,528,238 | 11.33 | 3 | 5 | –2 |
| Non-registered candidates | | 46,230 | 0.08 | 0 | 47,092 | 0.08 | 0 | 0 | 0 |
| Total | | 57,064,549 | 100.00 | 96 | 57,633,794 | 100.00 | 32 | 128 | 0 |
| Valid votes | | 57,064,549 | 96.08 | | 57,633,794 | 96.05 | | | |
| Invalid/blank votes | | 2,326,742 | 3.92 | | 2,369,932 | 3.95 | | | |
| Total votes | | 59,391,291 | 100.00 | | 60,003,726 | 100.00 | | | |
Source: INE (PR)

== Governing bodies ==
Its internal government has two main instances, namely:

- Board: Composed of a chair, three vice-chairs, and four secretaries elected for each regular session of the Senate; the chair is the president of the Senate and is the head and representative of the Chamber.
- Political Coordination Board: The true governing body of the Chamber consists of a chair and six members, which always include the coordinators of the different parliamentary factions of political parties represented in the Senate.

== Commissions ==
To deal with legislative affairs, senators form commissions dedicated to a particular issue. The most important committees are interior, constitutional issues, defense, finance, and justice. Each senator belongs to at least three different commissions, and each committee elects a chair and two to five secretaries (according to the commission) to coordinate their work.

== Sessions ==
The two chambers of the Congress of the Union divide their work into two ordinary sessions, the first from 1 September to 15 December and the second from 1 February to 30 April; if necessary, special sessions may be convened to discuss urgent or pertinent matters.

The time between the regular sessions is known as recess. There are two recesses: 16 December to 31 January and 1 May to 31 August. During these breaks, the standing committee of the Congress of the Union is installed and serves as the legislature's depository. It comprises 37 members — 19 deputies and 18 senators — appointed by their respective chambers the day before the closing of the regular sessions.

The standing committee's sessions are held in the Senate during the first recess and in the Chamber of Deputies during the second recess.

== Functions ==
Among the most important functions of the Senate is to ratify or reject the president's proposals regarding:

- Ministers of the Supreme Court of Justice of the Nation.
- The Attorney General of the Republic.
- Heads of autonomous bodies.
- Diplomatic representatives (ambassadors and consuls).
- Treaties.

== Gallery ==
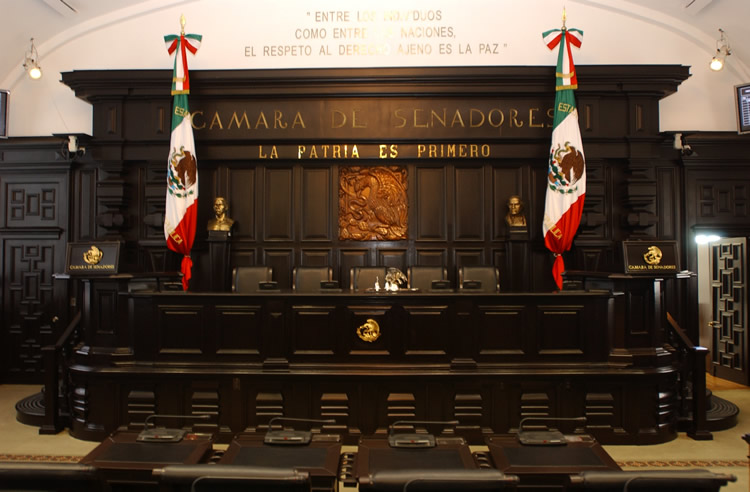
Former Senate tribune

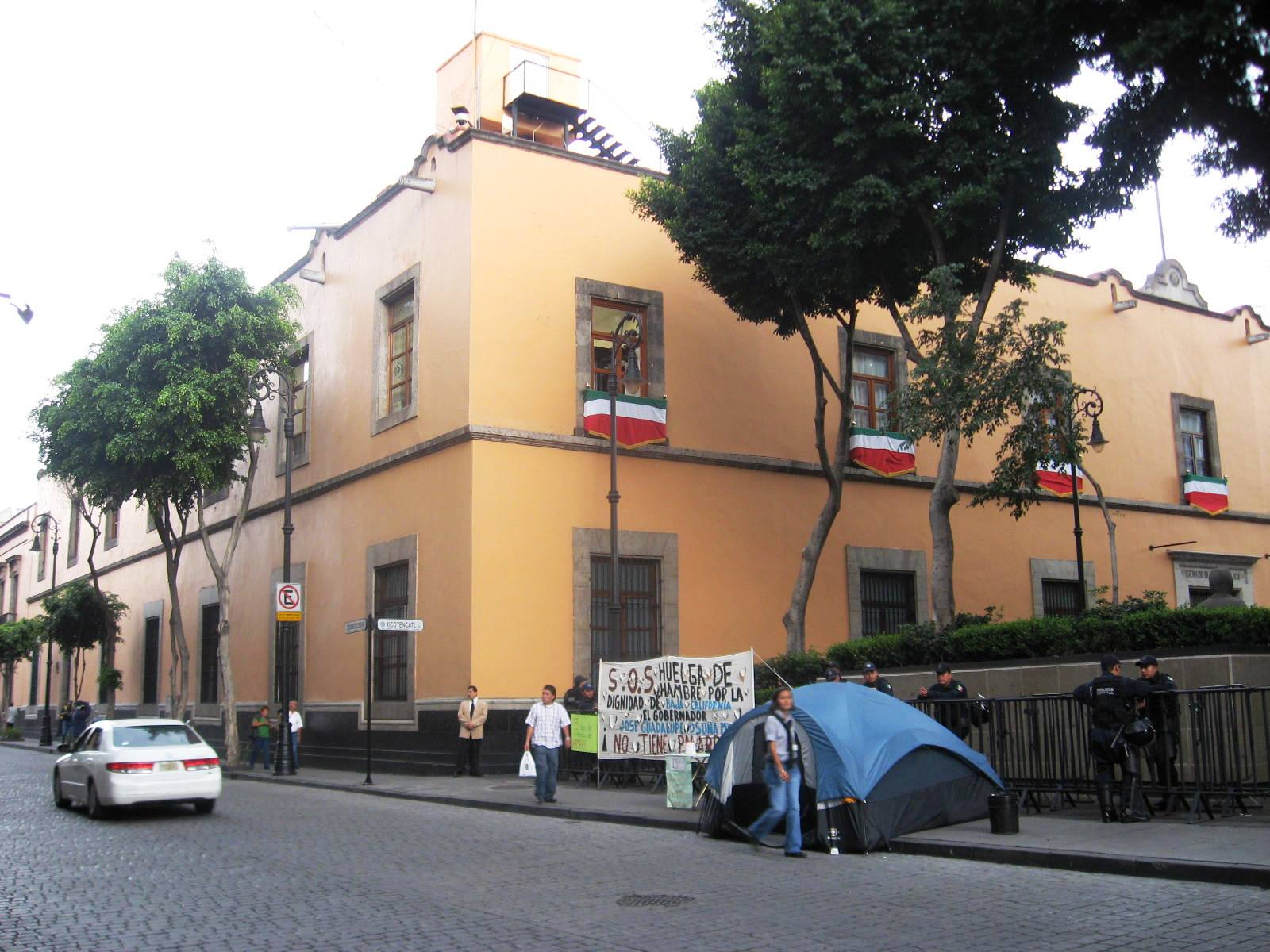
Former main Senate chamber at the corner of Donceles and Xicoténcatl streets in the historic center of Mexico City

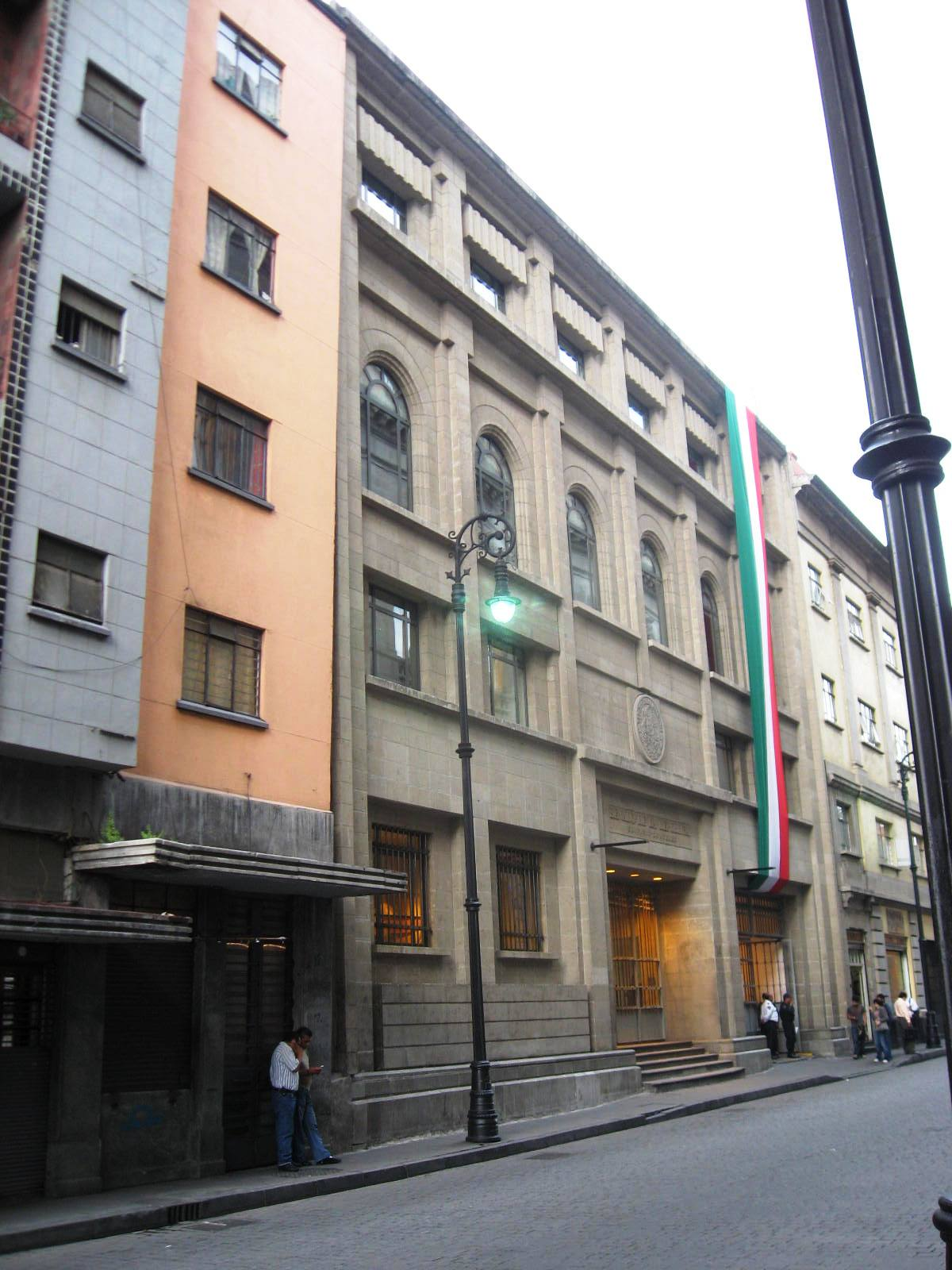
Former Senate offices on Donceles Street

== See also ==
- Chamber of Deputies (Mexico)
- Congress of the Union
