= 2024 Mexican Chamber of Deputies election =

Elections to the Chamber of Deputies of Mexico were held on 2 June 2024 as part of the 2024 general election, with all 500 seats in the Chamber of Deputies up for election. The winners will be elected for three-year terms to serve in the 66th Congress (1 September 2024 to 31 August 2027).

The 500 members of the Chamber of Deputies are elected in two ways: 300 are elected in single-member constituencies by plurality vote, and the remaining 200 are elected by proportional representation in five multi-member districts, with seats divided according to Hamilton's method. No party is permitted to hold more than 300 seats.

== Results ==
Party or alliance		Constituency			Party-list			Total seats
Party or alliance		Votes	%	Seats	Votes	%	Seats	Total seats
Sigamos Haciendo Historia	National Regeneration Movement	3,686,979	6.48	37	24,286,317	42.40	87	248
Sigamos Haciendo Historia	Ecologist Green Party of Mexico	676,092	1.19	0	4,993,988	8.72	18	75
Sigamos Haciendo Historia	Labor Party	507,604	0.89	0	3,254,718	5.68	12	50
Sigamos Haciendo Historia	Common candidates (Note: Of the elected candidates, 124 belong to the National Regeneration Movement, 57 to the Ecologist Green Party of Mexico, and 38 to the Labor Party.)	27,446,014	48.26	219				–
Sigamos Haciendo Historia	Total	32,316,689	56.82	256	33,421,610	58.35	117	373
Fuerza y Corazón por México	National Action Party	372,670	0.66	3	10,049,375	17.55	36	68
Fuerza y Corazón por México	Institutional Revolutionary Party	101,574	0.18	0	6,623,796	11.57	24	33
Fuerza y Corazón por México	Party of the Democratic Revolution	20,374	0.04	0	1,449,660	2.53	0	1
Fuerza y Corazón por México	Common candidates (Note: Of the elected candidates, 29 belong to the National Action Party, 9 to the Institutional Revolutionary Party, and 1 to the Party of the Democratic Revolution.)	17,493,425	30.76	39				–
Fuerza y Corazón por México	Total	17,988,043	31.63	42	18,000,854	31.43	60	102
Citizens' Movement		6,446,537	11.34	1	6,497,404	11.34	23	24
Independents		72,012	0.13	1	72,012	0.13	0	1
Non-registered candidates		48,871	0.09	0	47,092	0.08	0	0
Total		56,872,152	100.00	300	57,274,362	100.00	200	500
Valid votes		56,872,152	96.34		57,274,362	96.03		
Invalid/blank votes		2,162,171	3.66		2,369,932	3.97		
Total votes		59,034,323	100.00		59,644,294	100.00		
Source: INE

=== Deputies elected by district ===
==== Aguascalientes ====
01 ▌ Humberto Ambriz Delgadillo (PRI)
02 ▌ Mónica Becerra Moreno (PAN)
03 ▌ Paulo Gonzalo Martínez López (PAN)

==== Baja California ====
01 ▌ Alma Laura Ruiz López (MORENA)
02 ▌ Nancy Guadalupe Sánchez Arredondo (MORENA)
03 ▌ Claudia Moreno Ramírez (MORENA)
04 ▌ Rocío López Gorosave (MORENA)
05 ▌ Evangelina Moreno Guerra (MORENA)
06 ▌ Gilberto Herrera Solórzano (MORENA)
07 ▌ Armando Fernández Samaniego (MORENA)
08 ▌ Fausto Gallardo García (PVEM)
09 ▌ Araceli Brown Figueredo (MORENA)

==== Baja California Sur ====
01 ▌▌ Manuel Cota Cárdenas (PVEM) (Note: Was among the eight deputies who switched from Morena to the Ecologist Green Party of Mexico on 1 September 2024.)
02 ▌ Luis Armando Díaz (PT)

==== Campeche ====
01 ▌ Elda Castillo Quintana (MORENA)
02 ▌ Gabriela Basto González (MORENA)

==== Chiapas ====
01 ▌ Carlos Morelos Rodríguez (PT)
02 ▌ Karina del Río Zenteno (MORENA)
03 ▌ Alfredo Vázquez Vázquez (MORENA)
04 ▌ Joaquín Zebadúa Alva (MORENA)
05 ▌ Emilio Ramón Ramírez Guzmán (MORENA)
06 ▌ Flor Esponda Torres (MORENA)
07 ▌ Azucena Arreola Trinidad (MORENA)
08 ▌ Roberto Albores Gleason (PT)
09 ▌ Guillermo Santiago Rodríguez (MORENA)
10 ▌▌ Deliamaría González Flandez (PVEM)
11 ▌ Rosario del Carmen Moreno Villatoro (MORENA)
12 ▌ Rosa Irene Urbina Castañeda (MORENA)
13 ▌ Jorge Villatoro Osorio (PVEM)

==== Chihuahua ====
01 ▌ Daniel Murguía Lardizábal (MORENA)
02 ▌ Maité Vargas Meraz (MORENA)
03 ▌ Lilia Aguilar Gil (PT)
04 ▌▌ Alejandro Pérez Cuéllar (PVEM)
05 ▌ Juan Antonio Meléndez Ortega (PRI)
06 ▌ María Angélica Granados Trespalacios (PAN)
07 ▌ Roberto Corral Ordóñez (PT)
08 ▌ Alejandro Domínguez Domínguez (PRI)
09 ▌ Noel Chávez Velázquez (PRI)

==== Mexico City ====
01 ▌ César Cravioto Romero (MORENA)
02 ▌ José Benavides Castañeda (PT)
03 ▌ Gabriela Jiménez Godoy (MORENA)
04 ▌ Dolores Padierna Luna (MORENA)
05 ▌ Carlos Ulloa Pérez (MORENA)
06 ▌ Daniel Campos Plancarte (MORENA)
07 ▌ Guillermo Rendón Gómez (MORENA)
08 ▌ Ana María Lomelí (PVEM)
09 ▌ Rigoberto Salgado Vázquez (MORENA)
10 ▌ Margarita Zavala (PAN)
11 ▌ Elena Segura Trejo (MORENA)
12 ▌▌ Mónica Elizabeth Sandoval Hernández (PRI) (Note: Following the loss of the Party of the Democratic Revolution's registration as a federal party, on 20 September 2024, Sandoval Hernández joined the Institutional Revolutionary Party.)
13 ▌ Francisco Javier Sánchez Cervantes (MORENA)
14 ▌ Carlos Hernández Mirón (MORENA)
15 ▌ Federico Döring Casar (PAN)
16 ▌ Carina Piceno Navarro (MORENA)
17 ▌ Carlos Arturo Madrazo Silva (PVEM)
18 ▌ Gabriel García Hernández (MORENA)
19 ▌ Héctor Saúl Téllez Hernández (PAN)
20 ▌ Ana Karina Rojo Pimentel (PT)
21 ▌ José Carlos Acosta Ruiz (MORENA)
22 ▌ Marisela Zúñiga Cerón (MORENA)

==== Coahuila ====
01 ▌ Brígido Moreno Hernández (PT)
02 ▌ Javier Borrego Adame (MORENA)
03 ▌ Theodoros Kalionchiz de la Fuente (PAN)
04 ▌ Yerico Abramo Masso (PRI)
05 ▌ Guillermo Anaya Llamas (PAN)
06 ▌ Cintia Cuevas Sánchez (MORENA)
07 ▌ Antonio Castro Villarreal (MORENA)
08 ▌ Hilda Magdalena Licerio Valdés (PVEM)

==== Colima ====
01 ▌ Leoncio Morán Sánchez (MORENA)
02 ▌ Gricelda Valencia de la Mora (MORENA)

==== Durango ====
01 ▌ Martha Olivia García Vidaña (MORENA)
02 ▌▌ Betzabé Martínez Arango (PT) (Note: Was among the three deputies who switched from the Labor Party to Morena on 19 September 2024.)
03 ▌ Gerardo Villarreal Solís (PVEM)
04 ▌ Patricia Jiménez Delgado (PAN)

==== Guanajuato ====
01 ▌ Luis Gerardo Sánchez Sánchez (PRI)
02 ▌ Alma Rosa de la Vega Vargas (MORENA)
03 ▌ Fernando Torres Graciano (PAN)
04 ▌ Francisco Javier Estrada Domínguez (MORENA)
05 ▌ Éctor Jaime Ramírez Barba (PAN)
06 ▌ Cristina Márquez Alcalá (PAN)
07 ▌ Diana Gutiérrez Valtierra (PAN)
08 ▌ Ernesto Prieto Gallardo (MORENA)
09 ▌ Diego Rodríguez Barroso (PAN)
10 ▌ Alejandro Calderón Díaz (MORENA)
11 ▌ Miguel Salim Alle (PAN)
12 ▌ Magdalena Rosales Cruz (MORENA)
13 ▌ Lucero Higareda Segura (MORENA)
14 ▌ Juana Acosta Trujillo (MORENA)
15 ▌ José Javier Aguirre Gallardo (MORENA)

==== Guerrero ====
01 ▌ Celeste Mora Eguiluz (MORENA)
02 ▌ Yoloczin Domínguez Serna (MORENA)
03 ▌ Ma. del Carmen Cabrera Lagunas (PVEM)
04 ▌ Javier Taja Ramírez (MORENA)
05 ▌ Gerardo Olivares Mejía (PT)
06 ▌ Carmen Nava García (PVEM)
07 ▌ Carlos Sánchez Barrios (MORENA)
08 ▌ Marco Antonio de la Mora Torreblanca (PVEM)

==== Hidalgo ====
01 ▌ Daniel Andrade Zurutuza (MORENA)
02 ▌ Yamile Salomón Durán (PVEM)
03 ▌ Tatiana Ángeles Moreno (MORENA)
04 ▌ Alma de la Vega Sánchez (MORENA)
05 ▌ Viridiana Cornejo Gómez (MORENA)
06 ▌ Ricardo Crespo Arroyo (MORENA)
07 ▌ Mirna Rubio Sánchez (MORENA)

==== Jalisco ====
01 ▌▌ Javier Guízar Macías (PT) (Note: Was among the five deputies who switched from Morena to the Labor Party on 19 September 2024.)
02 ▌ Tecutli Gómez Villalobos (MC)
03 ▌ José Mario Íñiguez Franco (PAN)
04 ▌▌ Raúl Álvarez Villaseñor (MORENA) (Note: Was among the six deputies who switched from the Ecologist Green Party of Mexico to Morena on 1 September 2024.)
05 ▌ Bruno Blancas Mercado (MORENA)
06 ▌ Beatriz Carranza Gómez (MORENA)
07 ▌ Claudia García Hernández (MORENA)
08 ▌ Paola Espinosa (PAN)
09 ▌ Favio Castellanos Polanco (MORENA)
10 ▌ Omar Borboa Becerra (PAN)
11 ▌ Merilyn Gómez Pozos (MORENA)
12 ▌ Sandra Beatriz González Pérez (MORENA)
13 ▌ José Luis Sánchez González (PT)
14 ▌ Marcela Michel López (MORENA)
15 ▌ Alonso Vázquez Jiménez (PAN)
16 ▌ Alberto Maldonado Chavarín (MORENA)
17 ▌ Antonio Ramírez Ramos (PVEM)
18 ▌ Haidyd Arreola López (MORENA)
19 ▌ Clara Cárdenas Galván (MORENA)
20 ▌ Katia Castillo Lozano (MORENA)

==== Mexico ====
01 ▌ María Luisa Mendoza Mondragón (PVEM)
02 ▌▌ Dionicia Vázquez García (MORENA)
03 ▌▌ Diana Castillo Gabino (PT)
04 ▌ Melva Carrasco Godínez (MORENA)
05 ▌ Patricia Galindo Alarcón (PT)
06 ▌ Julieta Villapando Riquelme (MORENA)
07 ▌ Xóchitl Zagal Ramírez (MORENA)
08 ▌ Anay Beltrán Reyes (MORENA)
09 ▌▌ Iván Marín Rangel (PVEM)
10 ▌▌ Fernando Vilchis Contreras (PT)
11 ▌ Xóchitl Arzola Vargas (MORENA)
12 ▌ Armando Corona Arvizu (MORENA)
13 ▌ Alma Monserrat Córdoba Navarrete (MORENA)
14 ▌ Claudia Leticia Garfias Alcantára (MORENA)
15 ▌ Josefina Anaya Martínez (MORENA)
16 ▌ Emilio Manzanilla Téllez (PT)
17 ▌ Juan Hugo de la Rosa García (MORENA)
18 ▌ Claudia Sánchez Juárez (PVEM)
19 ▌ Gabriela Valdepeñas González (MORENA)
20 ▌ Monserrat Ruiz Páez (MORENA)
21 ▌ Iván Millán Contreras (MORENA)
22 ▌ Martha Moya Bastón (PAN)
23 ▌ José Luis Hernández Pérez (PVEM)
24 ▌ José Luis Durán Reveles (PVEM)
25 ▌ Leide Avilés Domínguez (MORENA)
26 ▌ Luis Miranda Barrera (PVEM)
27 ▌ Wblester Santiago Pineda (PT)
28 ▌ Roberto Ángel Domínguez Rodríguez (MORENA)
29 ▌ Gerardo Ulloa Pérez (MORENA)
30 ▌ César Agustín Hernández Pérez (MORENA)
31 ▌ Juan Ángel Bautista Bravo (MORENA)
32 ▌ Luis Enrique Martínez Ventura (PT)
33 ▌ Anaís Burgos Hernández (MORENA)
34 ▌ Mónica Álvarez Nemer (MORENA)
35 ▌ Arturo Roberto Hernández Tapia (MORENA)
36 ▌ Juan Carlos Varela Domínguez (MORENA)
37 ▌ Pedro Zenteno Santaella (MORENA)
38 ▌ Jesús Martín Cuanalo Araujo (PVEM)
39 ▌ José Luis Montalvo Luna (PT)
40 ▌ Azucena Huerta Romero (PVEM)

==== Michoacán ====
01 ▌ Leonel Godoy Rangel (MORENA)
02 ▌ José Luis Cruz Lucatero (MORENA)
03 ▌ Mary Carmen Bernal Martínez (PT)
04 ▌ Rosa Guadalupe Ortega Tiburcio (MORENA)
05 ▌ Miroslava Shember Domínguez (MORENA)
06 ▌ José Luis Téllez Marín (PT)
07 ▌ Marcela Velázquez Vázquez (MORENA)
08 ▌ Ernesto Núñez Aguilar (PVEM)
09 ▌ Guadalupe Mendoza Arias (Independent)
10 ▌ David Cortés Mendoza (PAN)
11 ▌ Vanessa López Carrillo (PT)

==== Morelos ====
01 ▌ Sandra Anaya Villegas (MORENA)
02 ▌ Ariadna Barrera Vázquez (MORENA)
03 ▌ Cindy Winkler Trujillo (PVEM)
04 ▌ Juan Ángel Flores Bustamante (MORENA)
05 ▌ Agustín Alonso Gutiérrez (MORENA)

==== Nayarit ====
01 ▌ Any Marilú Porras Baylón (MORENA)
02 ▌ Andrea Navarro Pérez (MORENA)
03 ▌ Jorge Armando Ortiz Rodriguez (PT)

==== Nuevo León ====
01 ▌ Homero Niño de Rivera Vela (PAN)
02 ▌ Andrés Cantú Ramírez (PRI)
03 ▌ Clara Luz Flores (MORENA)
04 ▌ Lilia Olivares Castañeda (PAN)
05 ▌ Santiago González Soto (PT)
06 ▌ Annia Gómez Cárdenas (PAN)
07 ▌ Carlos Alberto Guevara Garza (PVEM)
08 ▌ Adriana Quiroz Gallegos (MORENA)
09 ▌ Juan Francisco Espinoza Eguía (PRI)
10 ▌ Ana Isabel González González (PRI)
11 ▌ Pedro Garza Treviño (PAN)
12 ▌ Héctor de la Garza Villarreal (PVEM)
13 ▌ Luis Orlando Quiroga Treviño (PVEM)
14 ▌ José Gloria López (PT)

==== Oaxaca ====
01 ▌▌ Miriam Vázquez Ruiz (MORENA)
02 ▌ Irma Juan Carlos (MORENA)
03 ▌ Margarita García García (PT)
04 ▌ Naty Jiménez Vásquez (MORENA)
05 ▌ Carol Antonio Altamirano (MORENA)
06 ▌ José Alejandro López Sánchez (PT)
07 ▌ Gloria Sánchez López (MORENA)
08 ▌ Raúl Bolaños Cacho Cué (PVEM)
09 ▌ Carmen Bautista Peláez (MORENA)
10 ▌ Carmelo Cruz Mendoza (MORENA)

==== Puebla ====
01 ▌ Gissel Santander Soto (MORENA)
02 ▌ Fátima Cruz Peláez (PVEM)
03 ▌ María de los Ángeles Ballesteros García (MORENA)
04 ▌ Juan Antonio González Hernández (MORENA)
05 ▌ Vianey García Romero (MORENA)
06 ▌ Alejandro Carvajal Hidalgo (MORENA)
07 ▌ Claudia Rivera Vivanco (MORENA)
08 ▌ Ignacio Mier Bañuelos (MORENA)
09 ▌ José Antonio Gali López (PVEM)
10 ▌ Karina Pérez Popoca (MORENA)
11 ▌ José Antonio López Ruiz (PT)
12 ▌ Nora Merino Escamilla (PT)
13 ▌ Mario Miguel Carrillo Cubillas (MORENA)
14 ▌ Eduardo Castillo López (MORENA)
15 ▌ Rosario Orozco Caballero (MORENA)
16 ▌ Adolfo Alatriste Cantú (PVEM)

==== Querétaro ====
01 ▌ Gilberto Herrera Ruiz (MORENA)
02 ▌ Ricardo Astudillo Suárez (PVEM)
03 ▌ Lorena García Jimeno Alcocer (PAN)
04 ▌ Roberto Sosa Pichardo (PAN)
05 ▌ Mario Calzada Mercado (PRI)
06 ▌ Luis Humberto Fernández Fuentes (MORENA)

==== Quintana Roo ====
01 ▌ Juan Luis Carrillo Soberanis (PVEM)
02 ▌ Elda Xix Euán (MORENA)
03 ▌ Humberto Aldana Navarro (MORENA)
04 ▌ Mildred Ávila Vera (MORENA)

==== San Luis Potosí ====
01 ▌ Aremy Velazco Bautista (MORENA)
02 ▌ José Luis Fernández Martínez (PVEM)
03 ▌ Óscar Bautista Villegas (PVEM)
04 ▌ Francisco Adrián Castillo Morales (MORENA)
05 ▌ David Azuara Zúñiga (PAN)
06 ▌ Juan Carlos Valladares Eichelmann (PVEM)
07 ▌ Briceyda García Antonio (MORENA)

==== Sinaloa ====
01 ▌ Graciela Domínguez Nava(MORENA)
02 ▌ Ana Elizabeth Ayala Leyva (MORENA)
03 ▌ Jesús Fernando García Hernández (PT)
04 ▌ Felicita Pompa Robles (MORENA)
05 ▌ Jesús Ibarra Ramos (MORENA)
06 ▌ Olegaria Carrazco Macías (MORENA)
07 ▌ Merary Villegas Sánchez (MORENA)

==== Sonora ====
01 ▌ Manuel Baldenebro Arredondo (MORENA)
02 ▌ Jesús Antonio Pujol Irastorza (MORENA)
03 ▌ Diana Karina Barreras Samaniego (PT)
04 ▌▌ Ramón Flores Robles (PT)
05 ▌ Jacobo Mendoza Ruiz (MORENA)
06 ▌▌ Anabel Acosta Islas (PVEM)
07 ▌ Alma Higuera Esquer (MORENA)

==== Tabasco ====
01 ▌ Julio Ernesto Gutiérrez Bocanegra (MORENA)
02 ▌ Iván Peña Vidal (MORENA)
03 ▌ Rosa Margarita Graniel Zenteno (MORENA)
04 ▌ Jaime Humberto Lastra Bastar (MORENA)
05 ▌ Beatriz Millánd Pérez (MORENA)
06 ▌ Tey Mollinedo Cano (MORENA)

==== Tamaulipas ====
01 ▌▌ Carlos Enrique Canturosas Villarreal (PVEM)
02 ▌ Claudia Hernández Sáenz (MORENA)
03 ▌▌ Casandra de los Santos Flores (PVEM)
04 ▌▌ Mario Alberto López Hernández (PVEM)
05 ▌ José Braña Mojica (PVEM)
06 ▌ Blanca Narro Panameño (MORENA)
07 ▌ Olga Juliana Elizondo Guerra (PT)
08 ▌ Jesús Nader Nasrallah (PAN)

==== Tlaxcala ====
01 ▌ Alejandro Aguilar López (PT)
02 ▌▌ Raymundo Vázquez Conchas (MORENA)
03 ▌ Irma Yordana Garay Loredo (PT)

==== Veracruz ====
01 ▌ María del Carmen Pinete Vargas (PVEM)
02 ▌ Elizabeth Cervantes de la Cruz (MORENA)
03 ▌▌ Magaly Armenta Oliveros (MORENA)
04 ▌ María Josefina Gamboa Torales (PAN)
05 ▌ Francisco Javier Velázquez Vallejo (MORENA)
06 ▌ Jaime Humberto Pérez Bernabé (MORENA)
07 ▌ Mónica Herrera Villavicencio (MORENA)
08 ▌ Jorge Alberto Mier Acolt (MORENA)
09 ▌▌ Adrián González Naveda (PT)
10 ▌ Ana Miriam Ferráez Centeno (MORENA)
11 ▌ Roberto Ramos Alor (MORENA)
12 ▌ Rosa Hernández Espejo (MORENA)
13 ▌ Blanca Estela Hernández Rodríguez (PVEM)
14 ▌ Jessica Ramírez Cisneros (MORENA)
15 ▌ Corina Villegas Guarneros (MORENA)
16 ▌ Zenyazen Escobar García (MORENA)
17 ▌ Margarita Corro Mendoza (MORENA)
18 ▌ Benito Aguas Atlahua (PVEM) (Note: Aguas Atlahua was murdered in Zongolica, Veracruz, on 9 December 2024. His alternate, Puertos Chimalhua, was sworn in on 11 December.)

▌ Jonathan Puertos Chimalhua (PVEM)

19 ▌ Paola Tenorio Adame (MORENA)

==== Yucatán ====
01 ▌ Rocío Barrera Puc (MORENA)
02 ▌ Jorge Luis Sánchez Reyes (MORENA)
03 ▌ Óscar Brito Zapata (MORENA)
04 ▌ Isabel Rodríguez Heredia (PAN)
05 ▌ Jazmín Villanueva Moo (MORENA)
06 ▌ Jessica Saiden Quiroz (MORENA)

==== Zacatecas ====
01 ▌ Soledad Luévano Cantú (MORENA)
02 ▌▌ Julia Olguín Serna (MORENA)
03 ▌ Ulises Mejía Haro (MORENA)
04 ▌ Ana Luisa del Muro García (PT)

=== Deputies elected by proportional representation ===
==== First electoral region ====
▌ César Damián Retes (PAN)
▌ Paulina Rubio Fernández (PAN)
▌ Agustín Rodríguez Torres (PAN)
▌ Rocío González Alonso (PAN)
▌ Francisco Pelayo Covarrubias (PAN)
▌ Verónica Pérez Herrera (PAN)
▌ Miguel Ángel Monraz Ibarra (PAN)
▌ Eva María Vásquez Hernández (PAN)
▌ Arturo Yáñez Cuéllar (PRI)
▌ Graciela Ortiz González (PRI)
▌ Mario Zamora Gastélum (PRI)
▌ Sylvana Beltrones Sánchez (PRI)
▌ Juan Moreno de Haro (PRI) (Note: Héctor Melesio Cuén Ojeda had been assigned a seat through proportional representation but was murdered on 25 July 2024, before the start of the legislature. His alternate, Juan Moreno de Haro, took his place.)
▌ Greicy Marian Durán Alarcón (PT)
▌ Amarante Gonzalo Gómez Alarcón (PT)
▌ Ana Erika Santana González (PVEM)
▌▌ Alejandra Chedraui Peralta (MORENA)
▌ Mayra Espino Suárez (PVEM)
▌ Patricia Mercado (MC)
▌ Hugo Luna Vázquez (MC)
▌ Claudia Salas Rodríguez (MC)
▌ Gustavo de Hoyos Walther (MC)
▌ Patricia Flores Elizondo (MC)
▌ Alfredo Lozoya Santillán (MC)
▌ Gloria Núñez Sánchez (MC)
▌ Pablo Vázquez Ahued (MC)
▌ Adasa Saray Vázquez (MORENA)
▌ Gilberto Daniel Castillo García (MORENA)
▌ Marina Vitela Rodríguez (MORENA) (Note: On 11 December 2024, the Chamber's plenary granted Vitela Rodríguez's request to vacate her seat as of 15 January 2025.)
▌ Hugo Eric Flores Cervantes (MORENA)
▌ Mayra Dolores Palomar González (MORENA)
▌ Pedro Haces Barba (MORENA)
▌ Dora Alicia Moreno Méndez (MORENA)
▌ Fernando Castro Trenti (MORENA)
▌ Nadia Yadira Sepúlveda García (MORENA)
▌ Carlos Alfonso Candelaria López (MORENA)
▌ Karina Isabel Martínez Montaño (MORENA)
▌ Carlos Palacios Rodríguez (MORENA)
▌ Giselle Arellano Ávila (MORENA)
▌ Armando Cabada Alvídrez (MORENA)

==== Fourth electoral region ====
▌ Kenia López Rabadán (PAN)
▌ Jorge Romero Herrera (PAN)
▌ Liliana Ortiz Pérez (PAN)
▌ Rodrigo Miranda Berumen (PAN)
▌ Genoveva Huerta Villegas (PAN)
▌ Adrián Martínez Terrazas (PAN)
▌ Mariana Jiménez Zamora (PAN)
▌ Asael Hernández Cerón (PAN)
▌ Xitlalic Ceja García (PRI)
▌ Israel Betanzos Cortés (PRI)
▌ Nadia Navarro Acevedo (PRI)
▌ Carlos Gutiérrez Mancilla (PRI)
▌ Reginaldo Sandoval Flores (PT)
▌ Magdalena Núñez Monreal (PT)
▌ Felipe Miguel Delgado Carrillo (PVEM)
▌ Nayeli Fernández Cruz (PVEM)
▌ Ricardo Madrid Pérez (PVEM)
▌ Celia Esther Fonseca Galicia (PVEM)
▌ Claudia Ruiz Massieu Salinas (MC)
▌ Juan Ignacio Zavala Gutiérrez (MC)
▌ Amancay González Franco (MC)
▌ Gibran Ramírez Reyes (MC)
▌ Ifigenia Martínez y Hernández (MORENA)
▌ Cuauhtémoc Blanco (MORENA)
▌ Maiella Martha Gabriela Gómez Maldonado (MORENA)
▌ Arturo Olivares Cerda (MORENA)
▌ Julieta Kristal Vences Valencia (MORENA)
▌ Jaime Genaro López Vela (MORENA)
▌ Maribel Solache González (MORENA)
▌ Daniel Asaf Manjarrez (MORENA)
▌ Eunice Abigail Mendoza Ramírez (MORENA)
▌ Julio César Moreno Rivera (MORENA)
▌ Olga Sánchez Cordero (MORENA)
▌ Sergio Mayer (MORENA)
▌ María Teresa Ealy Diaz (MORENA)
▌ Carlos Castillo Pérez (MORENA)
▌ Mónica Fernández Cesar (MORENA)
▌ Jesús Valdés Peña (MORENA)
▌ María Rosete Sánchez (MORENA)
▌ Manuel Vázquez Arellano (MORENA)

==== Second electoral region ====
▌ César Verástegui Ostos (PAN)
▌ Nancy Olguín Díaz (PAN)
▌ Luis Enrique García López (PAN)
▌ Elizabeth Martínez Álvarez (PAN)
▌ Alan Sahir Márquez Becerra (PAN)
▌ Blanca Leticia Gutiérrez Garza (PAN)
▌ Víctor Pérez Díaz (PAN)
▌ Nubia Castillo Medina (PAN)
▌ Marcelo Torres Cofino (PAN)
▌ Noemí Luna Ayala (PAN)
▌ César Augusto Rendón García (PAN)
▌ Rubén Moreira Valdez (PRI)
▌ Marcela Guerra Castillo (PRI)
▌ Miguel Alonso Reyes (PRI)
▌ Verónica Martínez García (PRI)
▌ Erubiel Alonso Que (PRI)
▌ Fuensanta Guerrero Esquivel (PRI)
▌ Olga Herrera Natividad (PT)
▌ Ricardo Mejía Berdeja (PT)
▌ Rosalía León Rosas (PT)
▌ Carlos Alberto Puente Salas (PVEM)
▌ Leonor Noyola Cervantes (PVEM)
▌ Omar Alejandro Acosta Ornelas (PVEM)
▌ Graciela Gaitán Díaz (PVEM)
▌ Iraís Reyes de la Torre (MC)
▌ Miguel Ángel Sánchez Rivera (MC)
▌ Paola Longoria (MC)
▌ Raúl Lozano Caballero (MC)
▌ Anayeli Muñoz Moreno (MC)
▌ Ricardo Monreal Ávila (MORENA)
▌ Antares Vázquez Alatorre (MORENA)
▌ Arturo Ávila Anaya (MORENA)
▌ Petra Romero Gómez (MORENA)
▌ Napoleón Gómez Urrutia (MORENA)
▌ Amalia López De La Cruz (MORENA)
▌ Jorge Mendoza Sánchez (MORENA)
▌ Olga Leticia Chávez Rojas (MORENA)
▌ Gabino Morales Mendoza (MORENA)
▌ Magda Erika Salgado Ponce (MORENA)
▌ Adrián Oseguera Kernion (MORENA)

==== Fifth electoral region ====
▌ Tania Palacios Kuri (PAN)
▌ José Manuel Hinojosa Pérez (PAN)
▌ Teresa Ginez Serrano (PAN)
▌ Germán Martínez Cázares (PAN)
▌ Ana María Balderas Trejo (PAN)
▌ Armando Tejeda Cid (PAN)
▌ Julia Licet Jiménez Angulo (PAN)
▌ Samuel Palma César (PRI)
▌ Leticia Barrera Maldonado (PRI)
▌ Hugo Eduardo Gutiérrez Arroyo (PRI)
▌ Abigaíl Arredondo Ramos (PRI)
▌ Emilio Suárez Licona (PRI)
▌ Ivonne Ruiz Moreno (PRI)
▌ Ofelia Socorro Jasso Nieto (PRI)
▌ María Isidra De La Luz Rivas (PT)
▌ Javier Vázquez Calixto (PT)
▌ Gabriela Benavides Cobos (PVEM)
▌ Eruviel Ávila Villegas (PVEM)
▌ Liliana Carbajal Méndez (PVEM)
▌ Héctor Pedroza Jiménez (PVEM)
▌ Gildardo Pérez Gabino (MC)
▌ Laura Ballesteros Mancilla (MC)
▌ Juan Ignacio Samperio Montaño (MC)
▌ Laura Hernández García (MC)
▌ Juan Armando Ruiz Hernández (MC)
▌ Catalina Diaz Vilchis (MORENA)
▌ Fernando Mendoza Arce (MORENA)
▌ María Damaris Silva Santiago (MORENA)
▌ Alfonso Ramírez Cuéllar (MORENA)
▌ Diana Isela López Orozco (MORENA)
▌ Víctor Hugo Lobo Román (MORENA)
▌ Roselia Suarez Montes De Oca (MORENA)
▌ Manuel Espino Barrientos (MORENA)
▌ Mónica Miriam Granillo Velazco (MORENA)
▌ Francisco Javier Cabiedes Uranga (MORENA)
▌ Mariana Benítez Tiburcio (MORENA)
▌ Vidal Llerenas Morales (MORENA)
▌ Rosalinda Savala Díaz (MORENA)
▌ Sergio Gutiérrez Luna (MORENA)
▌ Rufina Benítez Estrada (MORENA)

==== Third electoral region ====
▌ Julen Rementería del Puerto (PAN)
▌ Claudia Quiñones Garrido (PAN)
▌ Elías Lixa Abimerhi (PAN)
▌ Abril Ferreyro Rosado (PAN)
▌ Ernesto Sánchez Rodríguez (PAN)
▌ María del Rosario Guzmán Avilés (PAN)
▌ Lorena Piñón Rivera (PRI)
▌ Christian Castro Bello (PRI)
▌ Ariana Rejón Lara (PRI)
▌ Emilio Lara Calderón (PRI)
▌ Francisco Espinosa Ramos (PT)
▌ Maribel Martínez Ruiz (PT)
▌ Pedro Vázquez González (PT)
▌ Aracely Cruz Jiménez (PT)
▌ Julio Scherer Pareyón (PVEM)
▌ Karina Alejandra Trujillo Trujillo (PVEM)
▌ Javier Herrera Borunda (PVEM)
▌▌ Santy Montemayor Castillo (MORENA)
▌ Alejandro Avilés Álvarez (PVEM)
▌ Sergio Gil Rullan (MC)
▌ Ivonne Ortega Pacheco (MC)
▌ Francisco Farías Bailón (MC)
▌ María De Fátima García León (MC)
▌ Rosa María Castro Salinas (MORENA)
▌ Kenia Muñiz Cabrera (MORENA)
▌ Patricia Armendáriz (MORENA)
▌ Luis Arturo Oliver Cen (MORENA)
▌ Zayra Linette Fernández Sarabia (MORENA)
▌ Humberto Coss Y León Zúñiga (MORENA)
▌ Herminia López Santiago (MORENA)
▌ Aniceto Polanco Morales (MORENA)
▌ Sonia Rincón Chanona (MORENA)
▌ Aciel Sibaja Mendoza (MORENA)
▌ Rocío Abreu (MORENA)
▌ Venustiano Caamal Cocom (MORENA)
▌ Karen Yaiti Calcano Constantino (MORENA)
▌ Juan Carlos Natale (MORENA)
▌ Luz María Rodríguez Pérez (MORENA)
▌ Eleazar Guerrero Pérez (MORENA)
▌ Bertha Osorio Ferral (MORENA)
