= Rafael Ramos Becerril =

Mexican politician

Rafael Plácido Ramos Becerril
- Born: 5 October 1962 (age 63); Mexico City, Mexico
- Occupation: Politician
- Predecessor: Fernando Fernández García
- Successor: Armando Corona Rivera
- Political party: MC

Rafael Plácido Ramos Becerril (born 5 October 1962) is a Mexican politician affiliated with Convergencia. In the 2006 general election he was elected to the Chamber of Deputies to represent the State of Mexico's 12th district during the 60th session of Congress.
