= Armando Corona =

Armando Corona may refer to:

- Armando Corona Rivera (born 1966), Mexican politician
- Armando Corona Arvizu (born 1995), Mexican politician
- Armando Corona (freemason) (1921–2009), grand master of the Grand Orient of Italy
