= Inocencio Ibarra Piña =

Mexican politician

- Born: 22 June 1967 (age 58); State of Mexico, Mexico
- Occupation: Politician
- Political party: PRI

Inocencio Ibarra Piña (born 22 June 1967) is a Mexican politician from the Institutional Revolutionary Party (PRI). In the 2009 mid-terms he was elected to the Chamber of Deputies to represent the State of Mexico's 25th district during the 61st session of Congress.
