= Luis Alonso Mejía García =

Mexican politician

- Born: 27 April 1946 (age 80); Tamaulipas, Mexico
- Occupation: Politician
- Political party: PAN

Luis Alonso Mejía García (born 27 April 1946) is a Mexican politician from the National Action Party (PAN). In the 2006 general election, he was elected to the Chamber of Deputies to represent Tamaulipas's 8th district during the 60th session of Congress.
