= Francisco Javier Gudiño Ortiz =

Mexican politician (born 1968)

Francisco Javier Gudiño Ortíz
- Born: 6 January 1968; Jalisco, Mexico
- Other name: Javier Gudiño
- Education: Preparatoria Regional Tizapán (Módulo Jocotepec)
- Occupation: Politician
- Political party: PAN (1990s–2012); PRI (2012–2015)

Francisco Javier Gudiño Ortíz (born 6 January 1968) is a Mexican politician affiliated with the Institutional Revolutionary Party (PRI) who previously belonged to the National Action Party (PAN).

In the 2006 general election, he was elected to the Chamber of Deputies to represent Jalisco's 17th district during the 60th session of Congress on the PAN ticket.
