= César Navarro de Alba =

Mexican politician

- Born: 9 June 1968 (age 57); State of Mexico, Mexico
- Occupation: Politician
- Political party: PRI

César Reynaldo Navarro de Alba (Note: In this Mexican name, the surname is Navarro and the second or maternal family name is de Alba.) (born 9 June 1968) is a Mexican politician affiliated with the Institutional Revolutionary Party (PRI). In the 2012 general election he was elected to the Chamber of Deputies to represent the State of Mexico's 12th district during the 62nd session of Congress.
