= Alberto López Rojas =

Mexican politician

- Born: 2 January 1959 (age 67); State of Mexico, Mexico
- Occupation: Politician
- Political party: PRD

Alberto López Rojas (born 2 January 1959) is a Mexican politician affiliated with the Party of the Democratic Revolution (PRD). In the 2006 general election he was elected to the Chamber of Deputies to represent the State of Mexico's 25th district during the 60th session of Congress.
