= Maricela Serrano Hernández =

Mexican politician

- Born: 3 March 1961 (age 65); State of Mexico, Mexico
- Occupation: Politician
- Political party: PRI
- Spouse: Jesús Tolentino Román Bojórquez

Maricela Serrano Hernández (born 3 March 1961) is a Mexican politician from the Institutional Revolutionary Party. She is a deputy to the LXIII Legislature of the Mexican Congress representing the 12th district of the State of Mexico.

== Life ==
In 1983, Serrano obtained her law degree from the UNAM; the next year, she served as a PRI representative at an electoral polling station, she served in positions related to the Antorcha Campesina movement, ultimately becoming its state leader, and as a PRI sectional committee head in Ixtapaluca. Between 1991 and 1993, she served on the municipal council of Ixtapaluca; when her term ended, she served in additional local- and state-level position, as a delegate to councils on women's matters.

In 1997, she was an alternate local deputy in the LIII Legislature of the Congress of the State of Mexico, though she was not used in that legislature. Nearly a decade later, she got legislative experience when voters sent Serrano to the LXI Legislature of the Mexican Congress as a deputy. She served on the Social Development and Housing Commissions.

Between 2013 and 2015, Serrano was the municipal president of Ixtapaluca; she left that post to pursue a successful bid to represent the area in the Chamber of Deputies. She serves on three commissions: Urban Development and Land Use, Municipal Development, and Housing.

Serrano is currently in the process of obtaining her master's degree in public administration from the National Public Administration Institute.
