= Marrufo =

Marrufo is a surname. Notable people with the name include:

- Jair Marrufo (born 1977), American soccer referee
- José Marrufo (born 1996), Venezuelan footballer
- Omar Marrufo (born 1993), Mexican footballer
- Roberto Marrufo Torres (born 1949), Mexican politician
- William Marrufo, drummer for the band Ozomatli
