= Beatriz Cervantes Mandujano =

Mexican politician

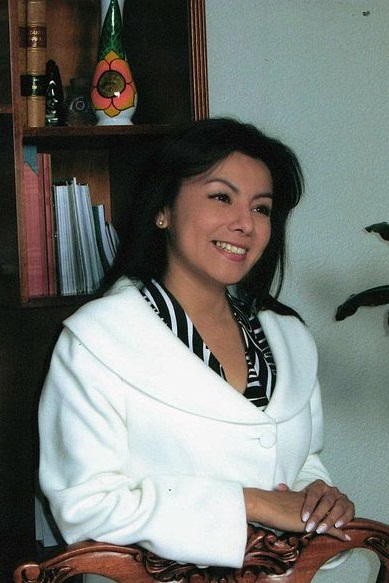
- Born: 2 September 1976 (age 49); Chiconcuac de Juárez, State of Mexico, Mexico
- Occupation: Politician
- Political party: PRI

Beatriz Cervantes Mandujano (born 2 September 1976) is a Mexican politician from the Institutional Revolutionary Party (PRI). In the 2000 general election she was elected to the Chamber of Deputies to represent the State of Mexico's 12th district during the 58th session of Congress.
