= María Angélica Ramírez Luna =

Mexican politician

- Born: 21 August 1975 (age 51); Puebla, Puebla, Mexico
- Education: UPAEP
- Occupation: Politician
- Political party: PAN

María Angélica Ramírez Luna (born 21 August 1975) is a Mexican politician affiliated with the National Action Party (PAN). In the 2003 mid-terms she was elected to the Chamber of Deputies to represent Puebla's 11th district during the 59th session of Congress.
