= Diego Alonso Hinojosa Aguerrevere =

Mexican politician

- Born: 2 December 1945 (age 80); Mexico City, Mexico
- Occupation: Politician
- Political party: PAN

Diego Alonso Hinojosa Aguerrevere (born 2 December 1945) is a Mexican politician from the National Action Party (PAN). In the 2000 general election, he was elected to the Chamber of Deputies to represent Tamaulipas's 8th district during the 58th session of Congress.
