= Alfonso Othón Bello Pérez =

Mexican politician

- Born: 4 December 1968 (age 57); Puebla, Mexico
- Occupation: Politician
- Political party: PAN

Alfonso Othón Bello Pérez (born 4 December 1968) is a Mexican politician from the National Action Party (PAN). In the 2006 general election he was elected to the Chamber of Deputies to represent Puebla's 11th district during the 60th session of Congress.
