= Julio Scherer (disambiguation) =

Julio Scherer García (1926–2015) was a Mexican author and journalist who edited Excélsior from 1968 to 1976 and founded the news-magazine Proceso.

Julio Scherer may also refer to:

- Julio Scherer Ibarra (born 1959), son of Scherer García, Mexican attorney and politician who served as Legal Counsel of the Federal Executive in 2018–2021
- Julio Scherer Pareyón (born 1966), son of Scherer Ibarra, Mexican engineer and politician, elected to Congress in the 2024 Mexican Chamber of Deputies election
