= María del Carmen Mendoza Flores =

Mexican politician (born 1965)

- Born: 1 March 1965 (age 61); Querétaro, Querétaro, Mexico
- Occupation: Politician
- Political party: PAN

María del Carmen Mendoza Flores (born 1 March 1965) is a Mexican politician affiliated with the National Action Party (PAN). In the 2003 mid-terms she was elected to the Chamber of Deputies to represent Jalisco's 10th district during the 59th session of Congress.
