= María Angélica Magaña Zepeda =

Mexican politician (born 1975)

- Born: 5 October 1975 (age 50); La Manzanilla de La Paz, Jalisco, Mexico
- Occupation: Politician
- Political party: PRI

María Angélica Magaña Zepeda (born 5 October 1975) is a Mexican politician affiliated with the Institutional Revolutionary Party (PRI). In the 2012 general election, she was elected to the Chamber of Deputies to represent Jalisco's 17th district during the 62nd session of Congress.
