= José Francisco Rábago =

Mexican politician

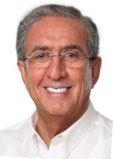
- Rábago in 2009
- Born: 8 March 1940 (age 86); Tampico, Tamaulipas, Mexico
- Occupation: Politician
- Political party: PRI

José Francisco Rábago Castillo (born 8 March 1940) is a Mexican politician from the Institutional Revolutionary Party (PRI). In the 2009 mid-terms, he was elected to the Chamber of Deputies to represent Tamaulipas's 8th district during the 61st session of Congress.
