= 2nd federal electoral district of Querétaro =

Federal electoral district of Mexico

Querétaro's 2nd
- Electoral district of the Chamber of Deputies of Mexico

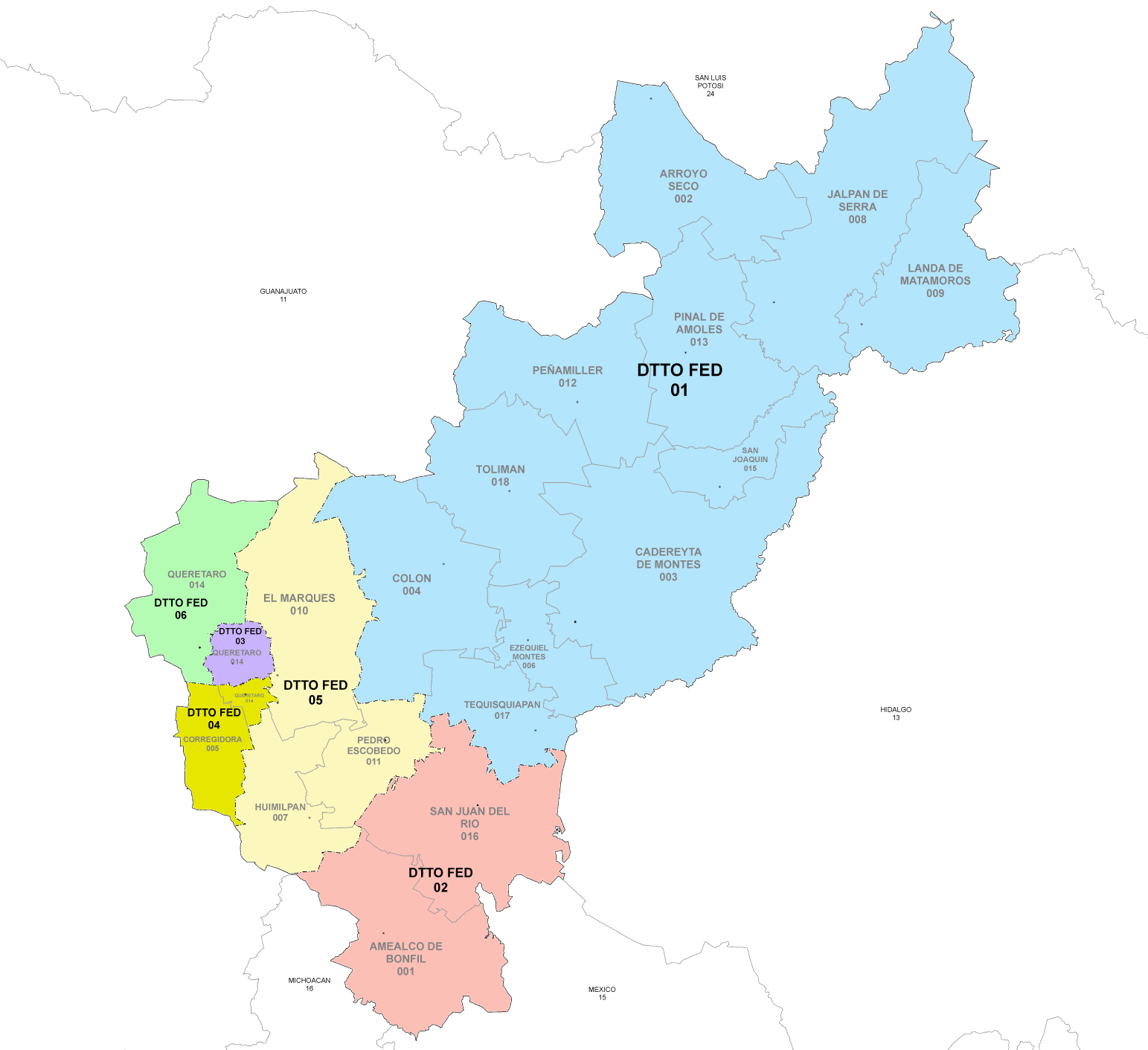
- 2nd district since 2023

Incumbent
- Member: Ricardo Astudillo Suárez
- Party: ▌Ecologist Green Party
- Congress: 66th (2024–2027)

District
- State: Querétaro
- Head town: San Juan del Río
- Coordinates: 20°23′N 99°59′W
- Covers: San Juan del Río, Amealco de Bonfil
- PR region: Fifth
- Precincts: 145
- Population: 364,463 (2020 census)

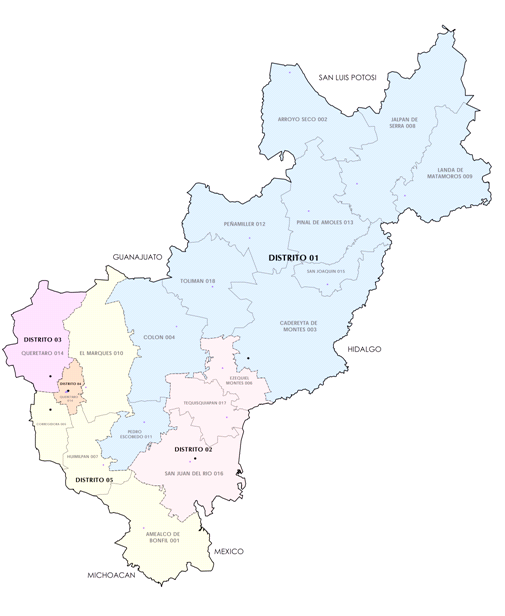
Querétaro under the 2017–2022 districting plan

The 2nd federal electoral district of Querétaro (Spanish: Distrito electoral federal 02 de Querétaro) is one of the 300 electoral districts into which Mexico is divided for elections to the federal Chamber of Deputies and one of six such districts in the state of Querétaro.

It elects one deputy to the lower house of Congress for each three-year legislative session by means of the first-past-the-post system. Votes cast in the district also count towards the calculation of proportional representation ("plurinominal") deputies; since 2024, those elected from the fifth region.

The current member for the district, elected in the 2024 general election, is Ricardo Astudillo Suárez of the Ecologist Green Party of Mexico (PVEM).

== District territory ==
Under the 2023 districting plan adopted by the National Electoral Institute (INE), which assigned Querétaro an additional seat in Congress and is to be used for the 2024, 2027 and 2030 federal elections, the 2nd district covers 145 precincts (secciones electorales) across two of the state's 18 municipalities:

- San Juan del Río and Amealco de Bonfil.

The head town (cabecera distrital), where results from individual polling stations are gathered together and tallied, is the city of San Juan del Río. The district reported a population of 364,463 in the 2020 census.

== Previous districting schemes ==
Evolution of electoral district numbers
	1974	1978	1996	2005	2017	2023
Querétaro	2	3	4	4	5	6
Chamber of Deputies	196	300				

2017–2022

Between 2017 and 2022, when the state contained five federal electoral districts, the 2nd district covered San Juan del Río, Amealco de Bonfil and Tequisquiapan. Its head town was at San Juan del Río.

2005–2017

Under the 2005 plan, Querétaro had four districts. The 2nd district had its head town at San Juan del Río and it covered Amealco de Bonfil, Corregidora, Huimilpan and San Juan del Río.

1996–2005

In the 1996 scheme, which gave Querétaro its fourth congressional seat, the district comprised Amealco de Bonfil, Corregidora, Huimilpan, El Marqués and San Juan del Río. The head town was at San Juan del Río.

1978–1996

The districting scheme in force from 1978 to 1996 was the result of the 1977 electoral reforms, which increased the number of single-member seats in the Chamber of Deputies from 196 to 300. Under that plan, Querétaro's seat allocation rose from two to three. The 2nd district had its head town at San Juan del Río and it comprised the municipalities of Amealco, Cadereyta, Ezequiel Montes, Pedro Escobedo, San Juan del Río and Tequisquiapan.

== Deputies returned to Congress ==
(Mexico) National parties
- Current
- PAN
- PRI
- PT
- PVEM
- MC
- Morena
- PAZ
- Somos
- Defunct or local only
- PLM
- PNR
- PRM
- PNM
- PP
- PPS
- PARM
- PFCRN
- CON
- PANAL
- PSD
- PES
- PES
- PRD

Querétaro's 2nd district
Election	Deputy	Party	Term	Legislature
1916	Ernesto Perusquía		1916–1917	Constituent Congress of Querétaro
...
1973	Telésforo Trejo Uribe	Institutional Revolutionary Party	1973–1976	49th Congress
1976	Vicente Montes Velázquez	Institutional Revolutionary Party	1976–1979	50th Congress
1979	Federico Flores Tavares	Institutional Revolutionary Party	1979–1982	51st Congress
1982	Ramón Ordaz Almaraz	Institutional Revolutionary Party	1982–1985	52nd Congress
1985	Ezequiel Espinoza Mejía	Institutional Revolutionary Party	1985–1988	53rd Congress
1988	Octaviano Camargo Rojas	Institutional Revolutionary Party	1988–1991	54th Congress
1991	Gil Mendoza Pichardo	Institutional Revolutionary Party	1991–1994	55th Congress
1994	Ezequiel Espinoza Mejía	Institutional Revolutionary Party	1994–1997	56th Congress
1997	José Salvador Olvera Pérez	National Action Party (Mexico)	1997–2000	57th Congress
2000	Javier Rodríguez Ferrusca	National Action Party (Mexico)	2000–2003	58th Congress
2003	Raúl Rogelio Chavarría Salas	National Action Party (Mexico)	2003–2006	59th Congress
2006	Francisco Domínguez Servién (Note: Domínguez Servién resigned his seat on 24 February 2009.); Bibiana Rodríguez Montes	National Action Party (Mexico)	2006–2008; 2008–2009	60th Congress
2009	Adriana Fuentes Cortés	National Action Party (Mexico)	2009–2012	61st Congress
2012	Ricardo Astudillo Suárez	Ecologist Green Party of Mexico	2012–2015	62nd Congress
2015	María García Pérez	National Action Party (Mexico)	2015–2018	63rd Congress
2018	Jorge Luis Montes Nieves	National Regeneration Movement	2018–2021	64th Congress
2021	Marcia Solórzano Gallego	National Action Party (Mexico)	2021–2024	65th Congress
2024	Ricardo Astudillo Suárez	Ecologist Green Party of Mexico	2024–2027	66th Congress

== Presidential elections ==
Querétaro's 2nd district
Election	District won by	Party or coalition	%
2018	Andrés Manuel López Obrador	Juntos Haremos Historia	46.9411
2024	Claudia Sheinbaum Pardo	Sigamos Haciendo Historia	56.1417
