= Germán Pacheco Díaz =

Mexican politician

- Born: 16 March 1968 (age 58); Tampico, Tamaulipas, Mexico
- Occupation: Politician
- Political party: PAN

Germán Pacheco Díaz (born 16 March 1968) is a Mexican politician affiliated with the National Action Party (PAN). In the 2012 general election, he was elected to the Chamber of Deputies to represent Tamaulipas's 8th district during the 62nd session of Congress.
