= Adriana Fuentes Cortés =

Mexican politician

- Born: 2 October 1968 (age 57); Mexico City, Mexico
- Occupation: Politician
- Political party: PAN

Adriana Fuentes Cortés (born 2 October 1968) is a Mexican politician from the National Action Party (PAN). From 2009 to 2012 she served as a federal deputy in the 61st Congress, representing Querétaro's second district.
