= 8th federal electoral district of Tamaulipas =

Federal electoral district of Mexico

Tamaulipas's 8th
- Electoral district of the Chamber of Deputies of Mexico

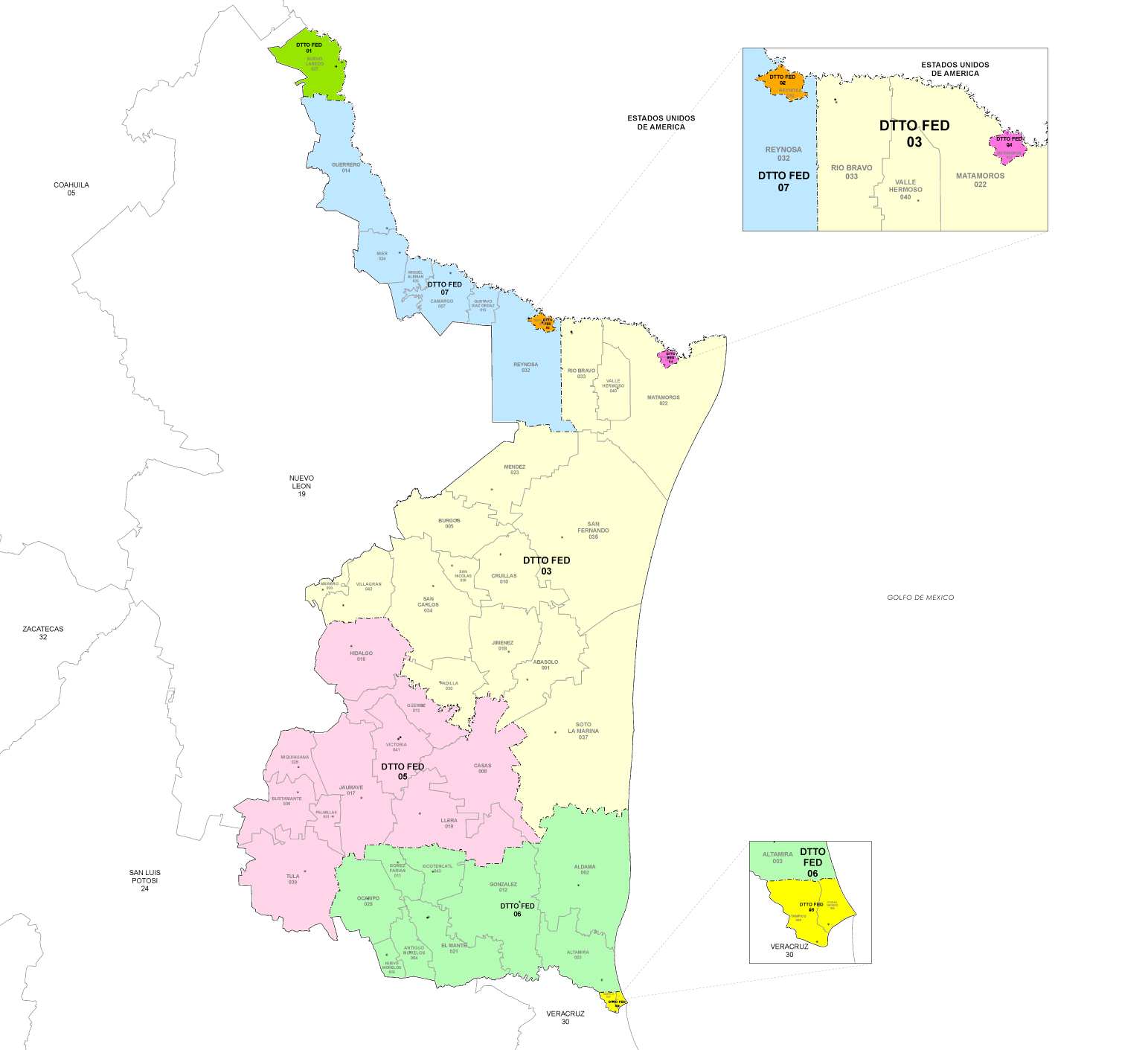
- 8th district since 2023

Incumbent
- Member: Jesús Nader Nasrallah
- Party: ▌National Action Party
- Congress: 66th (2024–2027)

District
- State: Tamaulipas
- Head town: Tampico
- Coordinates: 22°15′N 97°52′W
- Covers: Municipalities of Ciudad Madero and Tampico
- PR region: Second
- Precincts: 300
- Population: 503,518 (2020 census)

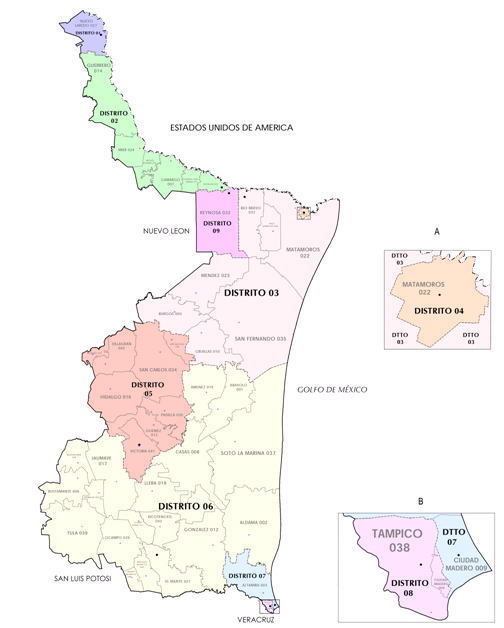
Tamaulipas's districts in 2017–2022

The 8th federal electoral district of Tamaulipas (Spanish: Distrito electoral federal 08 de Tamaulipas) is one of the 300 electoral districts into which Mexico is divided for elections to the federal Chamber of Deputies and one of eight such districts in the state of Tamaulipas.

It elects one deputy to the lower house of Congress for each three-year legislative session by means of the first-past-the-post system. Votes cast in the district also count towards the calculation of proportional representation ("plurinominal") deputies elected from the second region.

The 8th district was created as part of the 1977 electoral reforms, which increased the state's seat allocation from six to nine. The three new districts returned their first deputies in the 1979 mid-term election.

The current member for the district, elected in the 2024 general election, is Jesús Antonio Nader Nasrallah of the National Action Party (PAN).

== District territory ==
Tamaulipas lost a district in the 2023 districting plan adopted by the National Electoral Institute (INE), which is to be used for the 2024, 2027 and 2030 federal elections. The reconfigured 8th district is in the state's extreme south-east and comprises the 300 electoral precincts (secciones electorales) that make up two of the state's 43 municipalities:

- Ciudad Madero (107 precincts) and Tampico (193 precincts).

The head town (cabecera distrital), where results from individual polling stations are gathered together and tallied, is the city of Tampico. The district reported a population of 503,518 in the 2020 census.

== Previous districting schemes ==
Evolution of electoral district numbers
	1974	1978	1996	2005	2017	2023
Tamaulipas	6	9	8	8	9	8
Chamber of Deputies	196	300				

2017–2022

Between 2017 and 2022, Tamaulipas accounted for nine single-member congressional seats. The 8th district's head town was at Tampico and it covered the municipality of Tampico in its entirety and 42 precincts in Ciudad Madero (with the remainder assigned to the 7th district).

2005–2017

Under the 2005 plan, Tamaulipas had eight districts. This district's head town was at Tampico and it covered the whole of the municipality of Tampico plus 13 precincts in the west of Ciudad Madero.

1996–2005

In the 1996 scheme, under which Tamaulipas lost a single-member seat, the district had its head town at Tampico and it covered the city and its municipality.

1978–1996

The districting scheme in force from 1978 to 1996 was the result of the 1977 electoral reforms, which increased the number of single-member seats in the Chamber of Deputies from 196 to 300. Under that plan, Tamaulipas's seat allocation rose from six to nine. The new 8th district's head town was at San Fernando and it covered 17 municipalities:
- Abasolo, Aldama, Burgos, Casas, Cruillas, Guémez, Hidalgo, Jiménez, Llera, Mainero, Méndez, Padilla, San Carlos, San Fernando, San Nicolás, Soto la Marina and Villagrán.

== Deputies returned to Congress ==
(Mexico) National parties
- Current
- PAN
- PRI
- PT
- PVEM
- MC
- Morena
- PAZ
- Somos
- Defunct or local only
- PLM
- PNR
- PRM
- PNM
- PP
- PPS
- PARM
- PFCRN
- CON
- PANAL
- PSD
- PES
- PES
- PRD

Tamaulipas's 8th district
Election	Deputy	Party	Term	Legislature
1979	Pedro Reyes Martínez	Institutional Revolutionary Party	1979–1982	51st Congress
1982	Manuel Cavazos Lerma	Institutional Revolutionary Party	1982–1985	52nd Congress
1985	Gerardo Tomás Gómez Castillo	Institutional Revolutionary Party	1985–1988	53rd Congress
1988	Manuel Cavazos Lerma	Institutional Revolutionary Party	1988–1991	54th Congress
1991	Hugo Andrés Araujo de la Torre	Institutional Revolutionary Party	1991–1994	55th Congress
1994	Anastacia Guadalupe Flores Valdez	Institutional Revolutionary Party	1994–1997	56th Congress
1997	Blanca Rosa García Galván	Institutional Revolutionary Party	1997–2000	57th Congress
2000	Diego Alonso Hinojosa Aguerrevere	National Action Party (Mexico)	2000–2003	58th Congress
2003	Jesús Antonio Nader Nasrallah	National Action Party (Mexico)	2003–2006	59th Congress
2006	Luis Alonso Mejía García	National Action Party (Mexico)	2006–2009	60th Congress
2009	José Francisco Rábago Castillo	Institutional Revolutionary Party	2009–2012	61st Congress
2012	Germán Pacheco Díaz	National Action Party (Mexico)	2012–2015	62nd Congress
2015	Mercedes del Carmen Guillén Vicente	Institutional Revolutionary Party	2015–2018	63rd Congress
2018	Olga Patricia Sosa Ruiz	Social Encounter Party	2018–2021	64th Congress
2021	Rosa María González Azcárraga	National Action Party (Mexico)	2021–2024	65th Congress
2024	Jesús Antonio Nader Nasrallah	National Action Party (Mexico)	2024–2027	66th Congress

== Presidential elections ==
Tamaulipas's 8th district
Election	District won by	Party or coalition	%
2018	Andrés Manuel López Obrador	Juntos Haremos Historia	50.2724
2024	Claudia Sheinbaum Pardo	Sigamos Haciendo Historia	59.3582
