= Olga Patricia Sosa Ruiz =

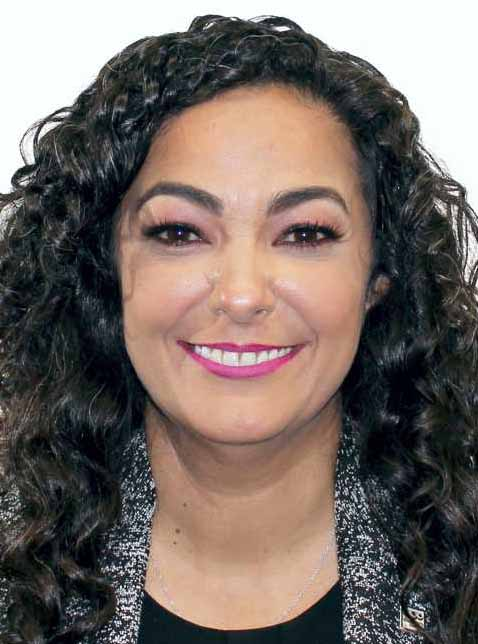
Olga Ruiz, 2018

Olga Patricia Sosa Ruiz is a Mexican politician, who serves as a federal deputy with leave for the LXIV Legislature of the Chamber of Deputies for the 8th district of Tamaulipas, after winning the district in the 2018 federal elections by the coalition "Juntos Haremos Historia" (Together We Will Make History). She had already held this position during the LXI Legislature (2009-2012), but being a substitute for José Francisco Rábago Castillo, both for the PRI (without having taken an oath).

She also served as a local deputy for the LXII Legislature of the Congress of Tamaulipas (2013-2016) for the "Todos Somos Tamaulipas" (We Are All Tamaulipas) Coalition (by the PRI and the Green Party) and for the local district XXII, after winning in the 2013 state elections.

During her term as federal deputy (2018-2021), she presented a total of 82 initiatives, of which 15 have been approved, making her work among the most outstanding among the popular representatives that the State of Tamaulipas has had.

In March 2021, Olga Sosa requested leave, to take care of other matters in her hometown (Tampico) and later her substitute Alba Silvia García Paredes took an oath to occupy her position in her absence.

In April 2021, she was registered as a candidate for the "Juntos Hacemos Historia" (Together We Make History) coalition in Tamaulipas (by MORENA and PT) to seek the municipal presidency of Tampico in the state elections of the same year.

Sosa Ruiz won election as one of Tamaulipas's senators in the 2024 Senate election, occupying the first place on the National Regeneration Movement's two-name formula.
