= 17th federal electoral district of Jalisco =

Federal electoral district of Mexico

Jalisco's 17th
- Electoral district of the Chamber of Deputies of Mexico

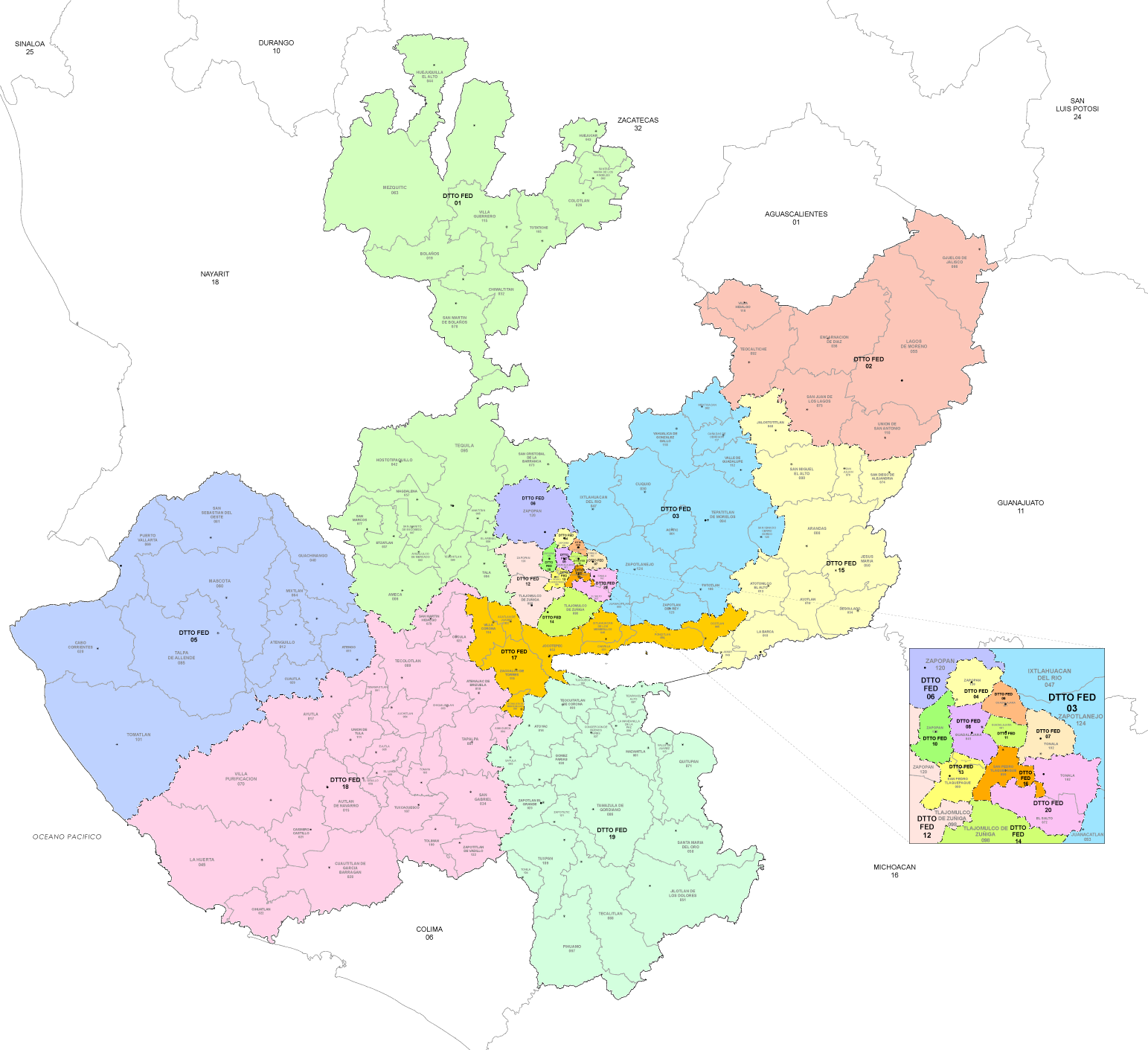
- 17th district

Incumbent
- Member: Antonio Ramírez Ramos
- Party: ▌Ecologist Green Party
- Congress: 66th (2024–2027)

District
- State: Jalisco
- Head town: Jocotepec
- Coordinates: 20°17′N 103°25′W
- Covers: Acatlán, Chapala, Ixtlahuacán, Jocotepec, Ocotlán, Poncitlán, Techaluta, Villa Corona, Zacoalco
- PR region: First
- Precincts: 153
- Population: 408,742 (2020 census)

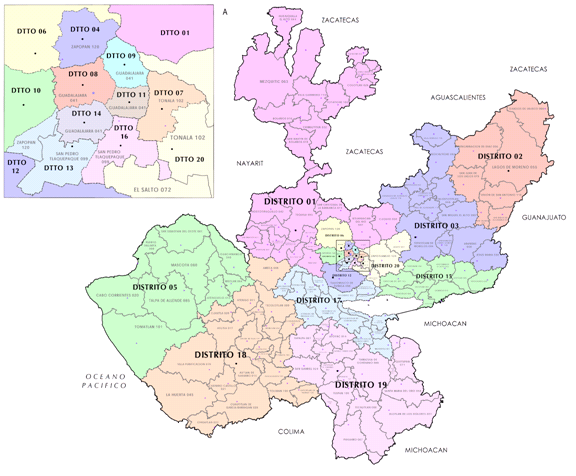
Jalisco's districts in 2017–2022

The 17th federal electoral district of Jalisco (Spanish: Distrito electoral federal 17 de Jalisco) is one of the 300 electoral districts into which Mexico is divided for elections to the federal Chamber of Deputies and one of 20 such districts in the state of Jalisco.

It elects one deputy to the lower house of Congress for each three-year legislative session by means of the first-past-the-post system. Votes cast in the district also count towards the calculation of proportional representation ("plurinominal") deputies elected from the first region.

Suspended in 1930, (Note: An amendment to Article 52 of the Constitution in 1928 changed the original provision of "one deputy per 60,000 inhabitants" to "one deputy per 100,000"; as a result, the size of the Chamber of Deputies fell from 281 in the 1928 election to 171 in 1934.) the 17th district was re-established as part of the 1977 electoral reforms. The restored district returned its first deputy in the 1979 mid-term election.

The current member for the district, re-elected in the 2024 general election, is Antonio de Jesús Ramírez Ramos of the Ecologist Green Party of Mexico (PVEM).

== District territory ==
Under the 2023 districting plan adopted by the National Electoral Institute (INE), which is to be used for the 2024, 2027 and 2030 federal elections, Jalisco's 17th district covers an area mostly located on the northern and western shores of Lake Chapala. It comprises 153 electoral precincts (secciones electorales) across nine of the state's 125 municipalities:

- Acatlán de Juárez, Chapala, Ixtlahuacán de los Membrillos, Jocotepec, Ocotlán, Poncitlán, Techaluta de Montenegro, Villa Corona and Zacoalco de Torres.

The head town (cabecera distrital), where results from individual polling stations are gathered together and tallied, is the city of Jocotepec. The district reported a population of 408,742 in the 2020 census.

== Previous districting schemes ==
Evolution of electoral district numbers
	1974	1978	1996	2005	2017	2023
Jalisco	13	20	19	19	20	20
Chamber of Deputies	196	300				

2017–2022

Jalisco regained its 20th congressional seat in the 2017 redistricting process. The 17th district's head town was at Jocotepec and it covered 15 municipalities:
- Acatlán de Juárez, Atemajac de Brizulea, Cocula, Concepción de Buenos Aires, Chapala, Ixtlahuacán de los Membrillos, Jocotepec, La Manzanilla de La Paz, Mazamitla, San Martín Hidalgo, Teocuitatlán de Corona, Tizapán El Alto, Tuxcueca, Villa Corona and Zacoalco de Torres.

2005–2017

Under the 2005 plan, Jalisco had 19 districts. This district's head town was at Jocotepec and it covered 18 municipalities:
- Acatlán de Juárez, Atoyac, Concepción de Buenos Aires, Chapala, Ixtlahuacán de los Membrillos, Jocotepec, Juanacatlán, La Manzanilla de La Paz, Mazamitla, Poncitlán, Quitupan, Techaluta de Montenegro, Teocuitatlán de Corona, Tizapán El Alto, Tuxcueca, Valle de Juárez, Zacoalco de Torres and Zapotlanejo.

1996–2005

In the 1996 scheme, under which Jalisco lost a single-member seat, the district had its head town at Jocotepec and it comprised 16 municipalities.
- Acatlán de Juárez, Amacueca, Atemajac de Brizulea, Atoyac, Chapala, Ixtlahuacán de los Membrillos, Jocotepec, Sayula, Tapalpa, Techaluta, Teocuitatlán de Corona, Tizapán El Alto, Tlacomulco de Zúñiga, Tuxcueca, Villa Corona and Zacoalco de Torres.

1978–1996

The districting scheme in force from 1978 to 1996 was the result of the 1977 electoral reforms, which increased the number of single-member seats in the Chamber of Deputies from 196 to 300. Under that plan, Jalisco's seat allocation rose from 13 to 20. The restored 17th district's head town was at Zapopan and it covered a part of the city and of its surrounding municipality.

== Deputies returned to Congress ==
(Mexico) National parties
- Current
- PAN
- PRI
- PT
- PVEM
- MC
- Morena
- PAZ
- Somos
- Defunct or local only
- PLM
- PNR
- PRM
- PNM
- PP
- PPS
- PARM
- PFCRN
- CON
- PANAL
- PSD
- PES
- PES
- PRD

Jalisco's 17th district
Election	Deputy	Party	Term	Legislature
1916	Esteban Baca Calderón		1916–1917	Constituent Congress of Querétaro
...
The 17th district was suspended between 1930 and 1979
1979	Margarita Gómez Juárez	Institutional Revolutionary Party	1979–1982	51st Congress
1982	Nicolás de Jesús Orozco Ramírez	Institutional Revolutionary Party	1982–1985	52nd Congress
1985	Jesús González Gortázar	Institutional Revolutionary Party	1985–1988	53rd Congress
1988	Sofía Valencia Abundis	Institutional Revolutionary Party	1988–1991	54th Congress
1991	Bernardo Gutiérrez Ochoa	Institutional Revolutionary Party	1991–1994	55th Congress
1994	Francisco Javier Guízar Macías	Institutional Revolutionary Party	1994–1997	56th Congress
1997	Felipe de Jesús Rangel Vargas	National Action Party (Mexico)	1997–2000	57th Congress
2000	Rafael Ramírez Sánchez	National Action Party (Mexico)	2000–2003	58th Congress
2003	Roberto Antonio Marrufo Torres	Institutional Revolutionary Party	2003–2006	59th Congress
2006	Francisco Javier Gudiño Ortiz	National Action Party (Mexico)	2006–2009	60th Congress
2009	Felipe de Jesús Rangel Vargas	National Action Party (Mexico)	2009–2012	61st Congress
2012	María Angélica Magaña Zepeda	Institutional Revolutionary Party	2012–2015	62nd Congress
2015	Martha Lorena Covarrubias Anaya	Institutional Revolutionary Party	2015–2018	63rd Congress
2018	Juan Martín Espinoza Cárdenas	Citizens' Movement (Mexico)	2018–2021	64th Congress
2021	Antonio de Jesús Ramírez Ramos	Ecologist Green Party of Mexico	2021–2024	65th Congress
2024	Antonio de Jesús Ramírez Ramos	Ecologist Green Party of Mexico	2024–2027	66th Congress

== Presidential elections ==
Jalisco's 17th district
Election	District won by	Party or coalition	%
2018	Andrés Manuel López Obrador	Juntos Haremos Historia	43.0479
2024	Claudia Sheinbaum Pardo	Sigamos Haciendo Historia	54.4784
