= Juan Carlos Natale =

Mexican politician (born 1981)

Juan Carlos Natale López (born 26 January 1981) is a Mexican politician. A Universidad Iberoamericana Puebla graduate, in the 2009 mid-terms he was elected to the Chamber of Deputies to represent Puebla's 11th district during the 61st session of Congress (2009–2012)
