= 10th federal electoral district of Jalisco =

Federal electoral district of Mexico

Jalisco's 10th
- Electoral district of the Chamber of Deputies of Mexico

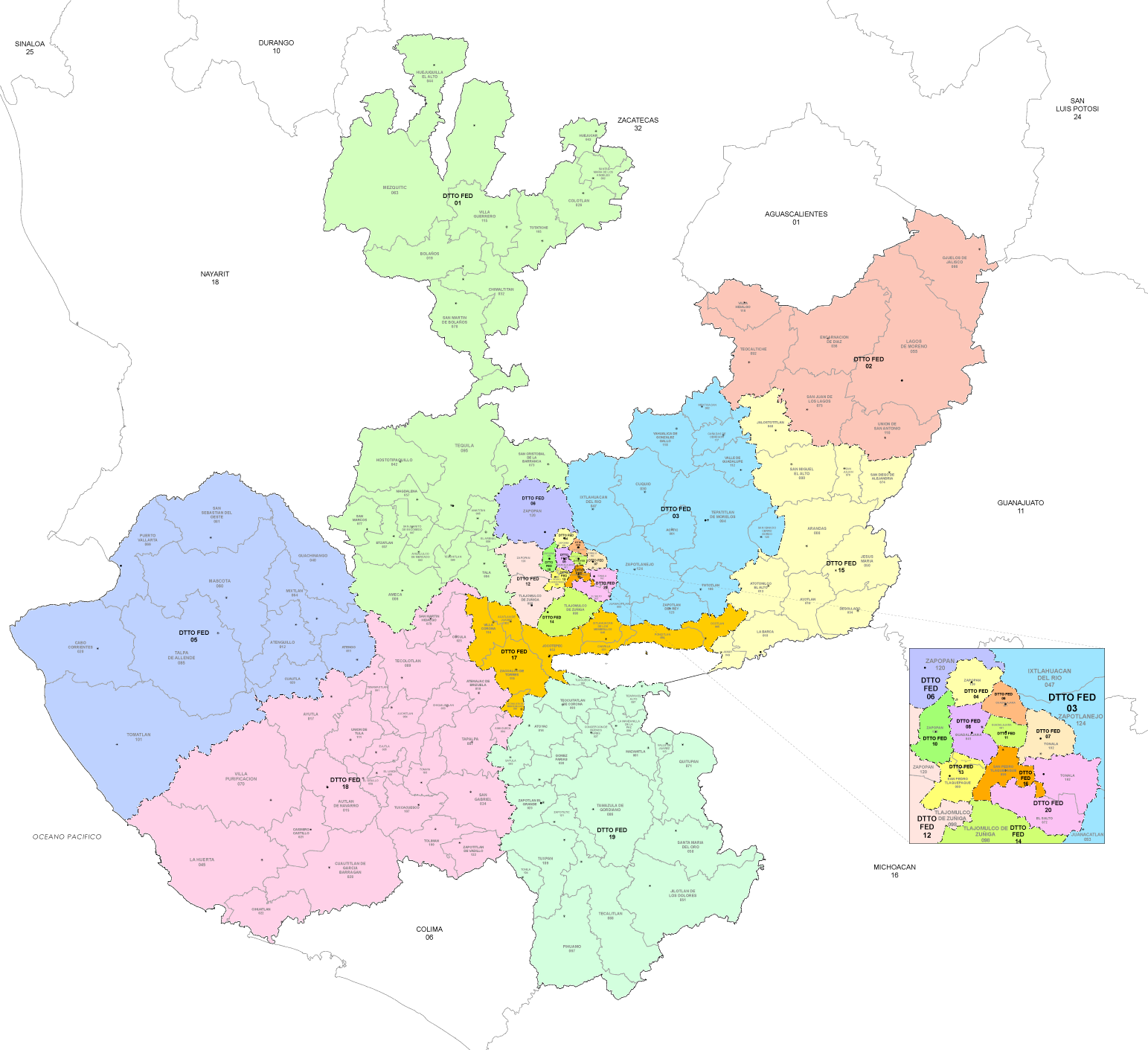
- 10th district

Incumbent
- Member: Omar Borboa Becerra
- Party: ▌National Action Party
- Congress: 66th (2024–2027)

District
- State: Jalisco
- Head town: Zapopan
- Coordinates: 20°43′N 103°23′W
- Covers: Municipality of Zapopan (part)
- PR region: First
- Precincts: 160
- Population: 440,616 (2020 census)

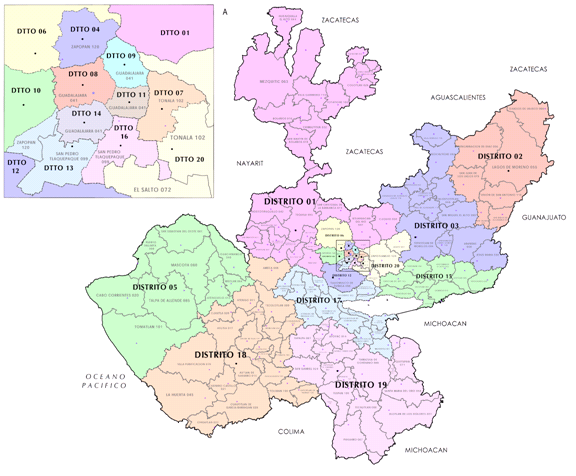
Jalisco's districts in 2017–2022

The 10th federal electoral district of Jalisco (Spanish: Distrito electoral federal 10 de Jalisco) is one of the 300 electoral districts into which Mexico is divided for elections to the federal Chamber of Deputies and one of 20 such districts in the state of Jalisco.

It elects one deputy to the lower house of Congress for each three-year legislative session by means of the first-past-the-post system. Votes cast in the district also count towards the calculation of proportional representation ("plurinominal") deputies elected from the first region.

The current member for the district, elected in the 2024 general election, is Omar Antonio Borboa Becerra of the National Action Party (PAN).

== District territory ==
Under the 2023 districting plan adopted by the National Electoral Institute (INE), which is to be used for the 2024, 2027 and 2030 federal elections, Jalisco's 10th district is located in the Guadalajara Metropolitan Area and comprises 160 electoral precincts (secciones electorales) across the municipality of Zapopan. (Note: The 4th, 6th and 12th districts cover the remainder of the municipality.)

The head town (cabecera distrital), where results from individual polling stations are gathered together and tallied, is the city of Zapopan. The district reported a population of 440,616 in the 2020 census.

== Previous districting schemes ==
Evolution of electoral district numbers
	1974	1978	1996	2005	2017	2023
Jalisco	13	20	19	19	20	20
Chamber of Deputies	196	300				

2017–2022

Jalisco regained its 20th congressional seat in the 2017 redistricting process. The 10th district covered 109 precincts in the south of the municipality of Zapopan.

2005–2017

Under the 2005 plan, Jalisco had 19 districts. The 10th comprised 103 precincts in the south of the municipality of Zapopan.

1996–2005

In the 1996 scheme, under which Jalisco lost a single-member seat, the district covered 109 precincts in the south-east of Zapopan.

1978–1996

The districting scheme in force from 1978 to 1996 was the result of the 1977 electoral reforms, which increased the number of single-member seats in the Chamber of Deputies from 196 to 300. Under that plan, Jalisco's seat allocation rose from 13 to 20. The 10th district's head town was at Ciudad Guzmán and it covered 16 municipalities:
- Atemajac de Brizuela, Ciudad Venustiano Carranza, Cocula, Chiquilistlán, Ejutla, El Grullo, Juchitlán, El Limón, Sayula, Tapalpa, Tecolotlán, Tolimán, Tonaya, Tuxcacuesco, Unión de Tula and Ciudad Guzmán.

== Deputies returned to Congress ==
(Mexico) National parties
- Current
- PAN
- PRI
- PT
- PVEM
- MC
- Morena
- PAZ
- Somos
- Defunct or local only
- PLM
- PNR
- PRM
- PNM
- PP
- PPS
- PARM
- PFCRN
- CON
- PANAL
- PSD
- PES
- PES
- PRD

Jalisco's 10th district
Election	Deputy	Party	Term	Legislature
1916	Jorge Villaseñor		1916–1917	Constituent Congress of Querétaro
...
1976	Francisco Javier Santillán Oceguera	Institutional Revolutionary Party	1976–1979	50th Congress
1979	Javier Michel Vega	Institutional Revolutionary Party	1979–1982	51st Congress
1982	Francisco Galindo Musa	Institutional Revolutionary Party	1982–1985	52nd Congress
1985	Francisco Contreras Contreras	Institutional Revolutionary Party	1985–1988	53rd Congress
1988	Francisco Javier Santillán Oceguera	Institutional Revolutionary Party	1988–1991	54th Congress
1991	Alejandro Ontiveros Gómez	Institutional Revolutionary Party	1991–1994	55th Congress
1994	Heriberto Santana Rubio	Institutional Revolutionary Party	1994–1997	56th Congress
1997	Juan José García de Alba Bustamante	National Action Party (Mexico)	1997–2000	57th Congress
2000	Jorge Urdapilleta Núñez	National Action Party (Mexico)	2000–2003	58th Congress
2003	María del Carmen Mendoza Flores	National Action Party (Mexico)	2003–2006	59th Congress
2006	Omar Antonio Borboa Becerra	National Action Party (Mexico)	2006–2009	60th Congress
2009	Francisco Javier Ramírez Acuña	National Action Party (Mexico)	2009–2012	61st Congress
2012	Omar Antonio Borboa Becerra	National Action Party (Mexico)	2012–2015	62nd Congress
2015	Macedonio Salomón Támez Guajardo	Citizens’ Movement (Mexico)	2015–2018	63rd Congress
2018	Geraldina Isabel Herrera Vega	Citizens’ Movement (Mexico)	2018–2021	64th Congress
2021	Horacio Fernández Castillo	Citizens’ Movement (Mexico)	2021–2024	65th Congress
2024	Omar Antonio Borboa Becerra	National Action Party (Mexico)	2024–2027	66th Congress

== Presidential elections ==
Jalisco's 10th district
Election	District won by	Party or coalition	%
2018	Ricardo Anaya Cortés	Por México al Frente	50.3930
2024	Bertha Xóchitl Gálvez Ruiz	Fuerza y Corazón por México	61.7101
