= 25th federal electoral district of the State of Mexico =

Federal electoral district of Mexico

State of Mexico's 25th
- Electoral district of the Chamber of Deputies of Mexico

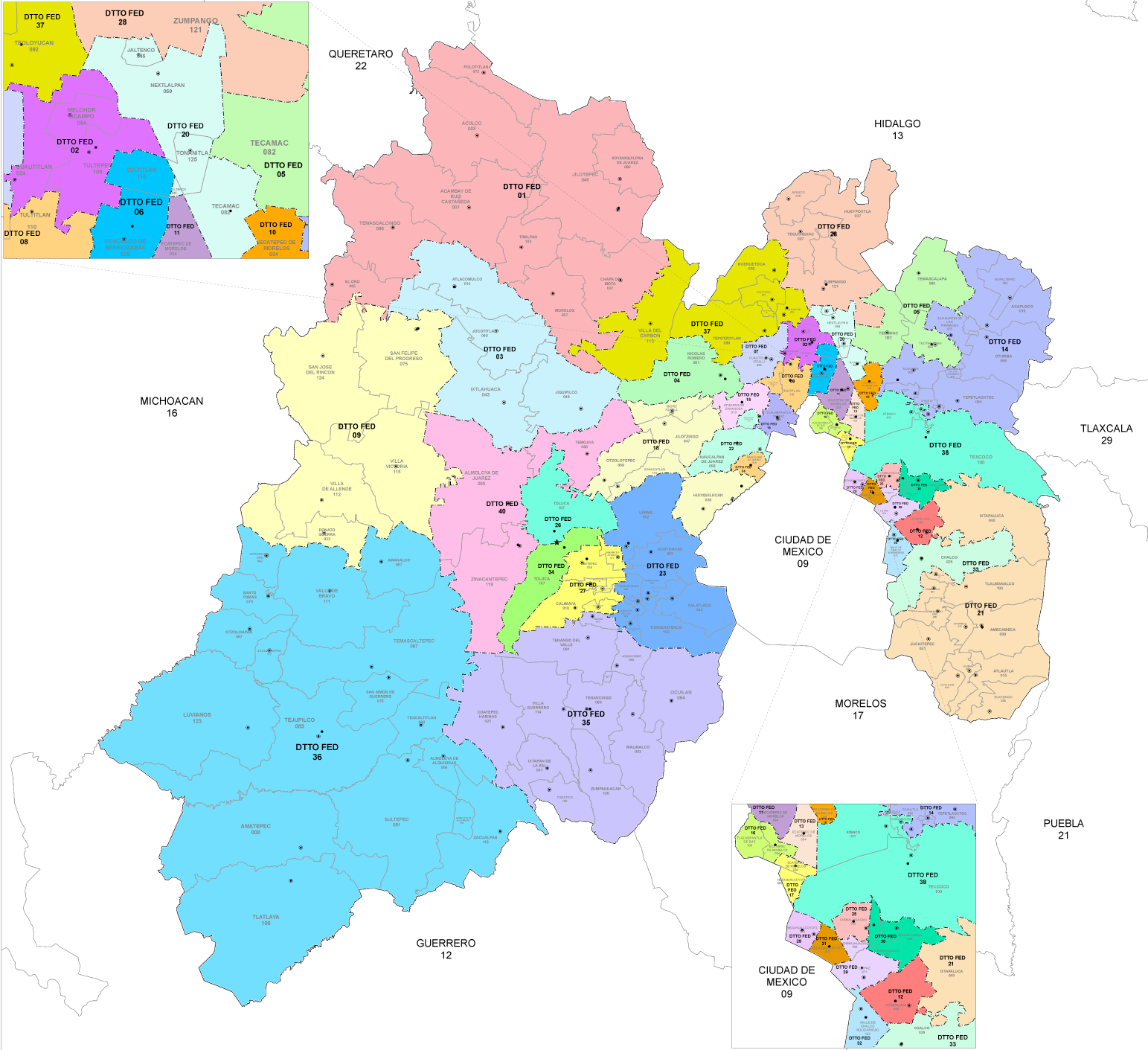
- State of Mexico's districts since 2023

Incumbent
- Member: Leide Avilés Domínguez
- Party: ▌Morena
- Congress: 66th (2024–2027)

District
- State: State of Mexico
- Head town: Chimalhuacán
- Coordinates: 19°24′N 98°58′W
- Covers: Chimalhuacán (part)
- PR region: Fifth
- Precincts: 98
- Population: 414,679 (2020 census)

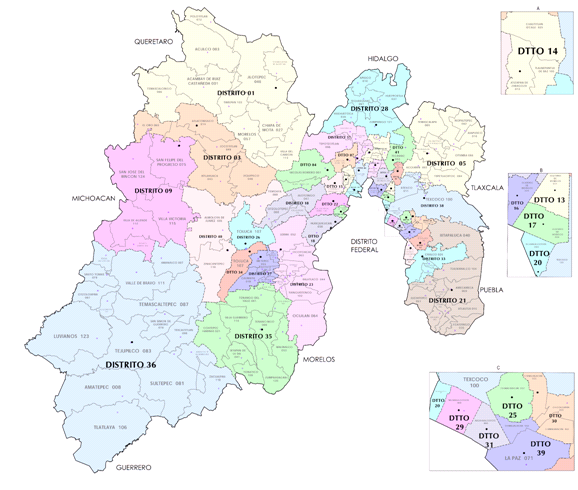
2017–2022 districting scheme

The 25th federal electoral district of the State of Mexico (Spanish: Distrito electoral federal 25 del Estado de México) is one of the 300 electoral districts into which Mexico is divided for elections to the federal Chamber of Deputies and one of 40 such districts in the State of Mexico.

It elects one deputy to the lower house of Congress for each three-year legislative session by means of the first-past-the-post system. Votes cast in the district also count towards the calculation of proportional representation ("plurinominal") deputies elected from the fifth region.

The 25th district was created by the 1977 electoral reforms, which increased the number of single-member seats in the Chamber of Deputies from 196 to 300. Under that plan, the State of Mexico's seat allocation rose from 15 to 34. The new districts were first contended in the 1979 mid-term election.

The current member for the district, elected in the 2024 general election, is Leide Avilés Domínguez of the National Regeneration Movement (Morena).

== District territory ==
Under the 2023 districting plan adopted by the National Electoral Institute (INE), which is to be used for the 2024, 2027 and 2030 federal elections, the 25th district is in the Greater Mexico City urban area and covers 98 electoral precincts (secciones electorales) across the central and northern portions of one of the state's 125 municipalities:

- Chimalhuacán (Note: Districts 30 and 39 cover the rest of the municipality.)

The head town (cabecera distrital), where results from individual polling stations are gathered together and tallied, is the city of Chimalhuacán. In the 2020 census, the district reported a total population of 414,679.

== Previous districting schemes ==
Evolution of electoral district numbers
	1974	1978	1996	2005	2017	2023
State of Mexico	15	34	36	40	41	40
Chamber of Deputies	196	300				

Under the previous districting plans enacted by the INE and its predecessors, the 25th district was situated as follows:

2017–2022

The centre and west of the municipality of Chimalhuacán.

2005–2017

The centre, south and south-east of Chimalhuacán.

1996–2005

The municipalities of Chimalhuacán and Chicoloapan and one neighbourhood in Nezahualcóyotl. The head town was at Chimalhuacán.

1978–1996

A portion of the municipality of Nezahualcóyotl.

== Deputies returned to Congress ==
(Mexico) National parties
- Current
- PAN
- PRI
- PT
- PVEM
- MC
- Morena
- PAZ
- Somos
- Defunct or local only
- PLM
- PNR
- PRM
- PNM
- PP
- PPS
- PARM
- PFCRN
- CON
- PANAL
- PSD
- PES
- PES
- PRD

State of Mexico's 25th district
Election	Deputy	Party	Term	Legislature
1979	Leonel Domínguez Rivero	Institutional Revolutionary Party	1979–1982	51st Congress
1982	Juan Herrera Servín	Institutional Revolutionary Party	1982–1985	52nd Congress
1985	José Delgado Valle	Institutional Revolutionary Party	1985–1988	53rd Congress
1988	Delfino Ronquillo Nava	Institutional Revolutionary Party	1988–1991	54th Congress
1991	José Benigno López Mateos	Institutional Revolutionary Party	1991–1994	55th Congress
1994	Olga Bernal Arenas	Institutional Revolutionary Party	1994–1997	56th Congress
1997	José Luis García Cortés	Party of the Democratic Revolution	1997–2000	57th Congress
2000	Elba Arrieta Pérez	Institutional Revolutionary Party	2000–2003	58th Congress
2003	Jesús Tolentino Román Bojórquez	Institutional Revolutionary Party	2003–2006	59th Congress
2006	Alberto López Rojas	Party of the Democratic Revolution	2006–2009	60th Congress
2009	Inocencio Ibarra Piña	Institutional Revolutionary Party	2009–2012	61st Congress
2012	Jesús Tolentino Román Bojórquez	Institutional Revolutionary Party	2012–2015	62nd Congress
2015	Telésforo García Carreón	Institutional Revolutionary Party	2015–2018	63rd Congress
2018	Delfino López Aparicio (Note: López Aparicio died in office on 20 December 2020. His alternate, López Cornejo, was sworn in on 13 January 2021.); Silvestre López Cornejo	National Regeneration Movement	2018–2020; 2021	64th Congress
2021	Carlos López Guadarrama	National Regeneration Movement	2021–2024	65th Congress
2024	Leide Avilés Domínguez	National Regeneration Movement	2024–2027	66th Congress

== Presidential elections ==
State of Mexico's 25th district
Election	District won by	Party or coalition	%
2018	Andrés Manuel López Obrador	Juntos Haremos Historia	58.1502
2024	Claudia Sheinbaum Pardo	Sigamos Haciendo Historia	67.3293
