= Roberto Marrufo Torres =

Mexican politician (born 1949)

- Born: 13 December 1949 (age 76); Guadalajara, Jalisco, Mexico
- Education: University of Guadalajara
- Occupation: Politician
- Political party: PRI

Roberto Antonio Marrufo Torres (born 13 December 1949) is a Mexican politician affiliated with the Institutional Revolutionary Party (PRI). In the 2003 mid-terms, he was elected to the Chamber of Deputies to represent Jalisco's 17th district during the 59th session of Congress.
