= Jorge Luis Montes Nieves =

Mexican psychologist and politician

Jorge Luis Montes Nieves is a Mexican psychologist and politician, and a member of the Movimiento Regeneración Nacional (Morena) party. He served as a federal deputy for the 2018 to 2021 period.

== Biography ==
Jorge Luis Montes Nieves has a degree in Clinical Area Psychology from the Universidad Autónoma de Querétaro, and has diplomas in Health and Gender, Alcoholism and Drug Addiction, Mental Health, and High School Education. He has exercised his career in a particular way, from 2004 to 2005 he was a psychologist at the DIF in Ezequiel Montes, Querétaro, and in 2005 he was a psycho-pedagogical advisor at the Colegio de Bachilleres de Querétaro.

From 2014 to 2017 he was secretary of Sexual Diversity of the municipal committee of Morena in Ezequiel Montes, in the elections of 2015 he was a candidate for local deputy, not having achieved the victory, and from 2017 to 2018 he was state advisor and member of the commission of Partisan Ethics of Morena.

In 2018, he was a candidate for federal deputy for the Juntos Haremos Historia ("Together we will make history") coalition for Querétaro's second district and was elected to the LXIV Legislature (2018–2021). In the Chamber of Deputies he was a member of the commissions of Education; of Regime, Regulations and Parliamentary Practices; and of Housing.

On May 16, 2020, he denounced having been arbitrarily detained by police officers from the state of Querétaro, without respect for his parliamentary immunity; this fact was condemned by the leader of Morena's deputies, Mario Delgado Carrillo, and the president of the Chamber of Deputies, Laura Rojas Hernández.
