= Delfino López Aparicio =

Mexican politician (1960–2020)

Delfino López Aparicio (9 February 1960 – 20 December 2020) was a Mexican politician from the National Regeneration Movement (Morena).

== Biography ==
In the 2018 general election he was elected to the Chamber of Deputies to represent the State of Mexico's 25th district. He served from 1 September 2018 till his death in office in 2020.

He died from COVID-19 during the COVID-19 pandemic in Mexico on 20 December 2020, aged 60. He was the second member of the Chamber of Deputies to succumb to the pandemic, after the death of Miguel Acundo González in September.
