= 12th federal electoral district of the State of Mexico =

Federal electoral district of Mexico

State of Mexico's 12th
- Electoral district of the Chamber of Deputies of Mexico

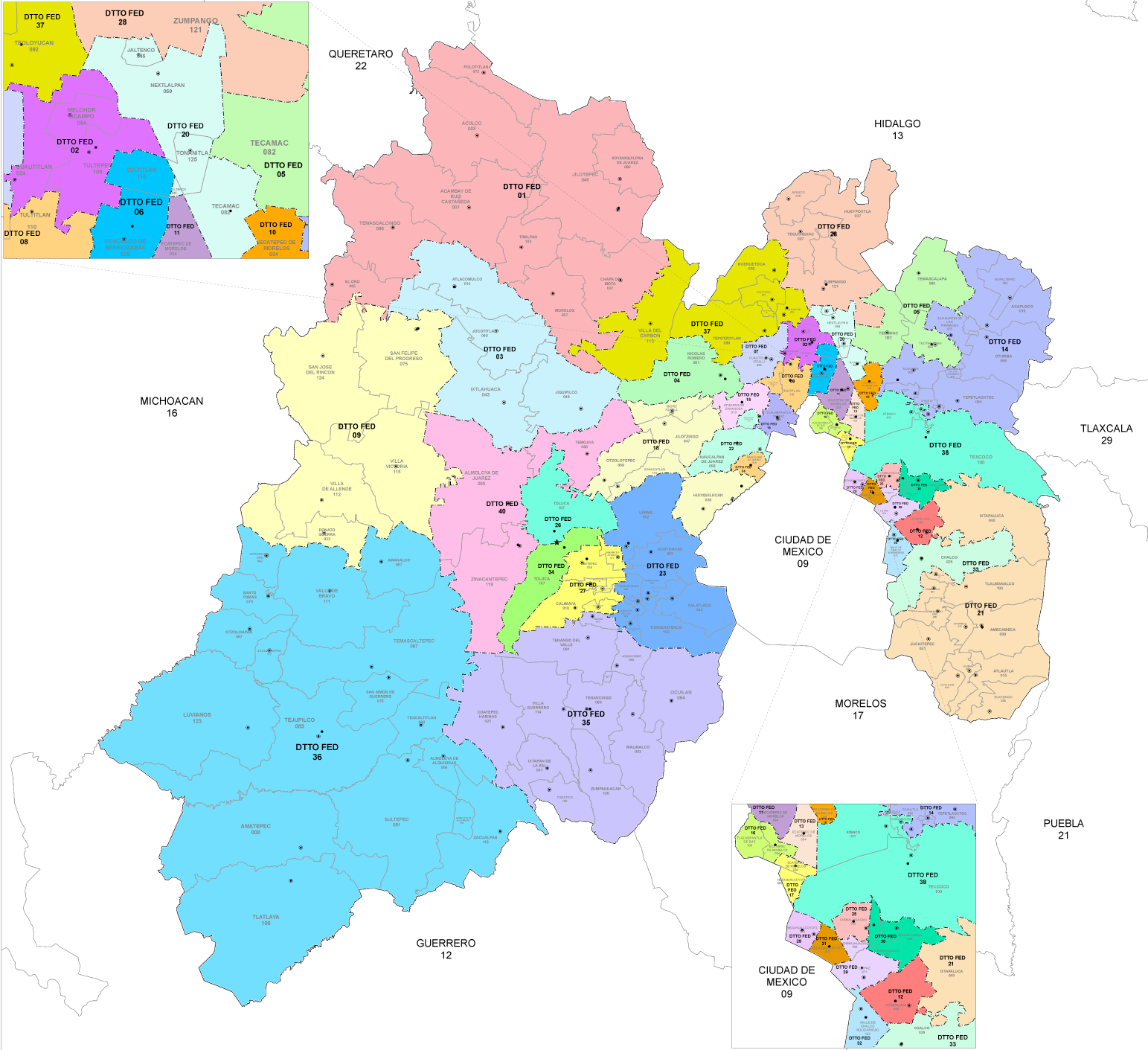
- State of Mexico's districts since 2023

Incumbent
- Member: Armando Corona Arvizu
- Party: ▌Morena
- Congress: 66th (2024–2027)

District
- State: State of Mexico
- Head town: Ixtapaluca
- Coordinates: 19°19′N 98°53′W
- Covers: Ixtapaluca (part)
- PR region: Fifth
- Precincts: 172
- Population: 407,396 (2020 census)

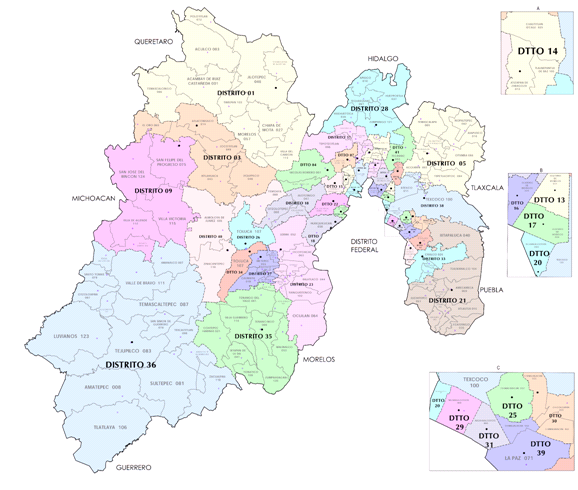
2017–2022 districting scheme

The 12th federal electoral district of the State of Mexico (Spanish: Distrito electoral federal 12 del Estado de México) is one of the 300 electoral districts into which Mexico is divided for elections to the federal Chamber of Deputies and one of 40 such districts in the State of Mexico.

It elects one deputy to the lower house of Congress for each three-year legislative session by means of the first-past-the-post system. Votes cast in the district also count towards the calculation of proportional representation ("plurinominal") deputies elected from the fifth region.

The current member for the district, re-elected in the 2024 general election, is Armando Corona Arvizu of the National Regeneration Movement (Morena).

== District territory ==
Under the 2023 districting plan adopted by the National Electoral Institute (INE), which is to be used for the 2024, 2027 and 2030 federal elections, the 12th district is located in the Greater Mexico City urban area, covering 172 precincts (secciones electorales) in the western portion of one of the state's 125 municipalities:

- Ixtapaluca (Note: The remainder of Ixtapaluca is covered by the 21st district (Amecameca).)

The head town (cabecera distrital), where results from individual polling stations are gathered together and tallied, is the city of Ixtapaluca. In the 2020 census, the district reported a total population of 407,396.

== Previous districting schemes ==
Evolution of electoral district numbers
| | 1974 | 1978 | 1996 | 2005 | 2017 | 2023 |
|---|---|---|---|---|---|---|
| State of Mexico | 15 | 34 | 36 | 40 | 41 | 40 |
| Chamber of Deputies | 196 | 300 | | | | |

Under the previous districting plans enacted by the INE and its predecessors, the 12th district was situated as follows:

2017–2022

The western portion of Ixtapaluca.

2005–2017

The entire municipality of Ixtapaluca and some northern neighbourhoods of Chalco.

1996–2005

The municipalities of Atenco, Chiautla, Chiconcuac, Ixtapaluca, Papalotla and Texcoco. The head town was at Texcoco de Mora.

1978–1996

Portions of the municipalities of Atizapán de Zaragoza and Tlalnepantla, with its head town at Atizapán de Zaragoza.

== Deputies returned to Congress ==
(Mexico) National parties
- Current
- PAN
- PRI
- PT
- PVEM
- MC
- Morena
- PAZ
- Somos
- Defunct or local only
- PLM
- PNR
- PRM
- PNM
- PP
- PPS
- PARM
- PFCRN
- CON
- PANAL
- PSD
- PES
- PES
- PRD

State of Mexico's 12th district
| Election | Deputy | Party | Term | Legislature |
|---|---|---|---|---|
| 1916 | Juan Manuel Giffard | | 1916–1917 | Constituent Congress of Querétaro |
...
| 1979 | Lorenzo Valdepeñas Machuca | Institutional Revolutionary Party | 1979–1982 | 51st Congress |
| 1982 | Maurilio Hernández González | Institutional Revolutionary Party | 1982–1985 | 52nd Congress |
| 1985 | Luis Pérez Díaz | Institutional Revolutionary Party | 1985–1988 | 53rd Congress |
| 1988 | Regulo Pastor Hernández Rivera | National Action Party (Mexico) | 1988–1991 | 54th Congress |
| 1991 | Pablo Casas Jaime | Institutional Revolutionary Party | 1991–1994 | 55th Congress |
| 1994 | José Francisco Lozada Chávez | Institutional Revolutionary Party | 1994–1997 | 56th Congress |
| 1997 | Alberto Martínez Miranda | Party of the Democratic Revolution | 1997–2000 | 57th Congress |
| 2000 | Beatriz Cervantes Mandujano | Institutional Revolutionary Party | 2000–2003 | 58th Congress |
| 2003 | Fernando Fernández García | Institutional Revolutionary Party | 2003–2006 | 59th Congress |
| 2006 | Rafael Plácido Ramos Becerril | Citizens' Movement (Mexico) | 2006–2009 | 60th Congress |
| 2009 | Armando Corona Rivera | Institutional Revolutionary Party | 2009–2012 | 61st Congress |
| 2012 | César Reynaldo Navarro de Alba | Institutional Revolutionary Party | 2012–2015 | 62nd Congress |
| 2015 | Maricela Serrano Hernández | Institutional Revolutionary Party | 2015–2018 | 63rd Congress |
| 2018 | Felipe Rafael Arvizu de la Luz | National Regeneration Movement | 2018–2021 | 64th Congress |
| 2021 | Armando Corona Arvizu | National Regeneration Movement | 2021–2024 | 65th Congress |
| 2024 | Armando Corona Arvizu | National Regeneration Movement | 2024–2027 | 66th Congress |

== Presidential elections ==
State of Mexico's 12th district
| Election | District won by | Party or coalition | % |
|---|---|---|---|
| 2018 | Andrés Manuel López Obrador | Juntos Haremos Historia | 60.1416 |
| 2024 | Claudia Sheinbaum Pardo | Sigamos Haciendo Historia | 67.2635 |
