= Antonio Ramírez Ramos =

Mexican politician (born 1987)

Member of Congress for Jalisco's 17th
- Incumbent
- Assumed office 1 September 2021

Municipal president of Mazamitla, Jalisco
- In office 2015–2021

Personal details
- Born: 17 January 1987 (age 38); Mazamitla, Jalisco, Mexico
- Political party: PVEM

Antonio de Jesús Ramírez Ramos (Note: In this Spanish name, the first or paternal surname is Ramírez and the second or maternal family name is Ramos.) (born 17 January 1987) is a Mexican architect and politician affiliated with the Ecologist Green Party of Mexico (PVEM). He has served two terms as municipal president of Mazamitla, Jalisco, and has been elected twice to the Chamber of Deputies for Jalisco's 17th congressional district.

== Career ==
Ramírez Ramos was born in Mazamitla, Jalisco, in 1987. He holds a degree in architecture (2009) and a master's in strategic communication (2020).

His career in public service began in 2012 when he joined the department of public works of the Mazamitla municipal government. In 2015 he was elected to a three-year term as municipal president of Mazamitla, and he was re-elected in 2018.

In the 2021 mid-term election, he was elected to the federal Chamber of Deputies to represent Jalisco's 17th district, based in Jocotepec, during the 65th session of Congress. During that term he was the secretary of the lower house's committees on education and livestock, and a member of the committees on science, technology and innovation, communications and transport, and sport.

He was re-elected to a second term in the 2024 general election. During the 66th session of Congress he serves on the committees for education and communications and transport, and is the secretary of the metropolitan areas committee.
