= Mercedes Guillén Vicente =

Mexican politician

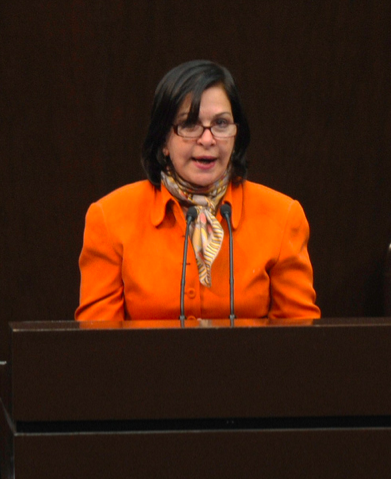
- Born: 5 June 1954 (age 72); Tampico, Tamaulipas, Mexico
- Occupation: Politician
- Political party: PRI

Mercedes del Carmen Guillén Vicente (born 5 June 1954) is a Mexican politician from the Institutional Revolutionary Party (PRI). She has served as a deputy in the Congress of Tamaulipas since 2024.

She has been elected to the Chamber of Deputies on two occasions: in the 2009 mid-terms (61st Congress) as a plurinominal deputy, and in the 2015 mid-terms (63rd Congress) for the 8th district of Tamaulipas.

She is the sister of Rafael Sebastián Guillén Vicente, whom the government alleges is the real identity of Subcomandante Marcos, the leader of the EZLN Zapatista guerrilla in Chiapas.
