= Fernando Fernández García =

Mexican politician

- Born: 21 December 1954 (age 71); Puebla, Puebla, Mexico
- Occupation: Politician
- Political party: PRI

Fernando Fernández García (born 21 December 1954) is a Mexican politician affiliated with the Institutional Revolutionary Party (PRI). In the 2003 mid-terms he was elected to the Chamber of Deputies to represent the State of Mexico's 12th district during the 59th session of Congress.
