= María Isabel Ortiz Mantilla =

Mexican politician

María Isabel Ortíz Mantilla
- Born: 3 September 1975 (age 50); Puebla, Puebla, Mexico
- Occupation: Secretaría de Medio Ambiente y ordenamiento territorial del Estado de Guanajuato
- Political party: PAN

María Isabel Ortíz Mantilla (born 3 September 1975) is a Mexican politician affiliated with the National Action Party (PAN).

In the 2012 general election she was elected to the Chamber of Deputies to represent Puebla's 11th district during the 62nd Congress.

She has also served as the secretary of the environment and zoning in the state of Guanajuato.
