= Felipe Rangel Vargas =

Mexican politician (born 1962)

- Born: 5 February 1962 (age 64); Guadalajara, Jalisco, Mexico
- Occupation: Politician
- Political party: PAN

Felipe de Jesús Rangel Vargas (born 5 February 1962) is a Mexican politician from the National Action Party (PAN).

A native of Guadalajara, Jalisco, Rangel Vargas has been elected to the Chamber of Deputies for Jalisco's 17th district (Jocotepec) on two occasions: in the 1997 mid-terms (to the 57th Congress), and in the 2009 mid-terms (to the 61st Congress).
