= Jesús Nader Nasrallah =

Mexican politician (born 1959)

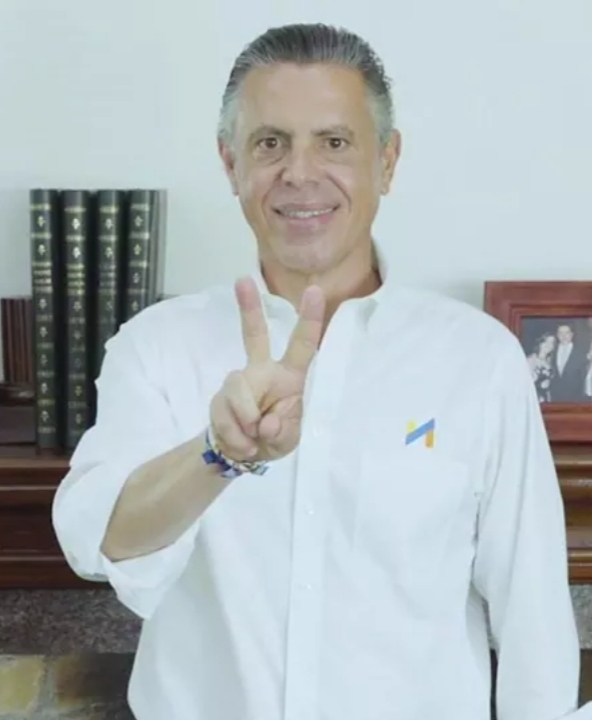
- Nasrallah in 2018
- Born: 21 January 1959 (age 67); Tampico, Tamaulipas, Mexico
- Occupation: Politician
- Political party: PAN
- Spouse: Aida Feres

Jesús Antonio Nader Nasrallah (born 2 May 1959) is a Mexican politician affiliated with the National Action Party (PAN). He is currently serving in the Chamber of Deputies during the 66th Congress for the 8th district of Tamaulipas.

He previously represented the same district during the 59th Congress (2003–2006) and was Tamaulipas state secretary of administration from 2016 to 2018.

In 2018, Nader was elected the municipal president of Tampico, Tamaulipas. He was re-elected to another three-year term in 2021.
