= Liliana Carbajal Méndez =

Mexican politician

- Born: 19 October 1976 (age 49); San Luis Potosí, San Luis Potosí, Mexico
- Occupation: Politician
- Political party: PAN

Liliana Carbajal Méndez (born 19 October 1976) is a Mexican politician from the National Action Party. From 2006 to 2009 she served as Deputy of the LX Legislature of the Mexican Congress representing San Luis Potosí.
