= Omar Borboa =

Mexican politician (born 1980)

- Born: 24 August 1980 (age 45); Guadalajara, Jalisco, Mexico
- Occupation: Politician
- Political party: PAN

Omar Antonio Borboa Becerra (born 24 August 1980) is a Mexican politician affiliated with the National Action Party (PAN).

Born in Guadalajara, Jalisco, in 1980, Borboa Becerra earned a law degree from the Universidad del Valle de Atemajac (UNIVA) in 2001. He has been elected to the Chamber of Deputies for Jalisco's 10th district (Zapopan) on three occasions: in the 2006 general election (to the 60th Congress), in the 2012 general election (to the 62nd Congress), and in the 2024 general election (to the 66th Congress).

In 2017 he was the general secretary of the PAN in Jalisco.
