= Jesús Tolentino Román =

Mexican politician

- Born: Jesús Tolentino Román Bojórquez; 10 September 1956 (age 69); León Fonseca, Sinaloa, Mexico
- Education: UNAM
- Occupation: Deputy
- Political party: PRI

Jesús Tolentino Román Bojórquez (born 10 September 1956) is a Mexican politician affiliated with the Institutional Revolutionary Party (PRI).

He was elected to the Chamber of Deputies to represent the State of Mexico's 25th district in both the 2003 mid-terms and the 2012 general election.
