= Ricardo Astudillo Suárez =

Mexican politician

- Born: 26 June 1975 (age 50); Mexico City, Mexico
- Occupation: Politician
- Political party: PVEM

Ricardo Astudillo Suárez (born 26 June 1975) is a Mexican politician affiliated with the Ecologist Green Party of Mexico (PVEM). In 2012–2015 he served as a federal deputy in the 62nd Congress, representing Querétaro's second district. He was re-elected to Congress for the same district in the 2024 general election.
