= Francisco Espinosa Ramos =

Mexican politician

- Born: 1 April 1954 (age 72); Chiapas, Mexico
- Occupation: Politician
- Political party: PT

Francisco Amadeo Espinosa Ramos (born 1 April 1954) is a Mexican politician affiliated with the Labor Party. He served as Deputy of the LIX and LXI Legislatures of the Mexican Congress as a plurinominal representative, and previously served in LXI Legislature of the Congress of Chiapas.
