= Armando Corona Rivera =

Mexican politician

- Born: February 17, 1966; Ixtapaluca, State of Mexico, Mexico
- Died: August 12, 2020 (aged 54); Mexico City, Mexico
- Occupation: Politician
- Political party: PRI
- Children: Armando Corona Arvizu

Armando Corona Rivera (17 February 1966 – 12 August 2020) was a Mexican politician from the Institutional Revolutionary Party (PRI). In the 2009 mid-terms he was elected to the Chamber of Deputies to represent the State of Mexico's 12th district during the 61st session of Congress.
