= Pedro Vázquez González =

Mexican economist and politician

- Born: 23 October 1953 (age 72); Nuevo León, Mexico
- Occupations: Economist and politician
- Political party: PT

Pedro Vázquez González (born 23 October 1953) is a Mexican economist and politician affiliated with the Labor Party. He served as Deputy of the LIX and LXI Legislatures of the Mexican Congress as a plurinominal representative, and previously served in the Congress of Nuevo León
