= Samuel Palma César =

Mexican politician

- Born: 19 January 1957 (age 69); Cuernavaca, Morelos, Mexico
- Occupation: Politician
- Political party: PRI

Víctor Samuel Palma César (born 19 January 1957) is a Mexican politician from the Institutional Revolutionary Party. From 2006 to 2009 he served as Deputy of the LX Legislature of the Mexican Congress representing Morelos.
