= Raúl Rogelio Chavarría Salas =

Mexican politician

- Born: 11 August 1956 (age 69); Querétaro, Mexico
- Died: March 10, 2019
- Occupation: Politician
- Political party: PAN

Raúl Rogelio Chavarría Salas (born 11 August 1956) is a Mexican politician affiliated with the National Action Party. As of 2014 he served as Deputy of the LIX Legislature of the Mexican Congress representing Querétaro.
