= Sonia Rincón Chanona =

Mexican politician

- Born: 10 November 1952 (age 73); Tuxtla Gutiérrez, Chiapas, Mexico
- Occupation: Deputy
- Political party: PANAL

Sonia Rincón Chanona (born 10 November 1952) is a Mexican politician affiliated with the PANAL. She served as federal deputy of both the LIX and LXII Legislatures of the Mexican Congress representing Chiapas, as well as a local deputy in the LXIII Legislature of the Congress of Chiapas.
