= Armando Corona Arvizu =

Mexican politician (born 1995)

Member of the Chamber of Deputies
- Incumbent
- Assumed office 1 September 2021
- Preceded by: Felipe Arvizu
- Constituency: State of Mexico's 12th

Personal details
- Born: 20 June 1995 (age 31)
- Party: Morena (since 2021)
- Parent: Armando Corona Rivera (father)
- Education: Universidad del Valle de México

Armando Corona Arvizu (born 20 June 1995) is a Mexican politician serving as a member of the Chamber of Deputies since 2021. He is the son of Armando Corona Rivera.
