= Congress of the Union =

Bicameral legislature of Mexico

General Congress of the United Mexican States Congreso General de los Estados Unidos Mexicanos
- LXVI Legislature

Type
- Type: Bicameral
- Houses: Senate of the Republic; Chamber of Deputies

History
- Founded: 28 September 1821

Leadership
- President of the Senate: Higinio Martínez Miranda (Morena) since 1 September 2026
- President of the Chamber of Deputies: Raúl Bolaños Cacho Cué (PVEM) since 1 September 2026

Structure
- Seats: 628 (500 Deputies) (128 Senators)
- Senate political groups: Government (87): Morena (66); PVEM (14); PT (6); No party (1); Opposition (41): PAN (21); PRI (13); MC (6); No party (1)
- Chamber of Deputies political groups: Government (365): Morena (253); PVEM (62); PT (49); Independent (1); Opposition (135): PAN (69); PRI (37); MC (29)
- Authority: Title III, Chapter II of the Political Constitution of the United Mexican States
- Salary: $131,874 pesos (Senator) $99,457 pesos (Deputy)

Elections
- Last Senate election: 2 June 2024
- Last Chamber of Deputies election: 2 June 2024
- Next Senate election: 2 June 2030
- Next Chamber of Deputies election: 6 June 2027

Motto
- La Patria Es Primero (The Fatherland Is First)

Meeting place
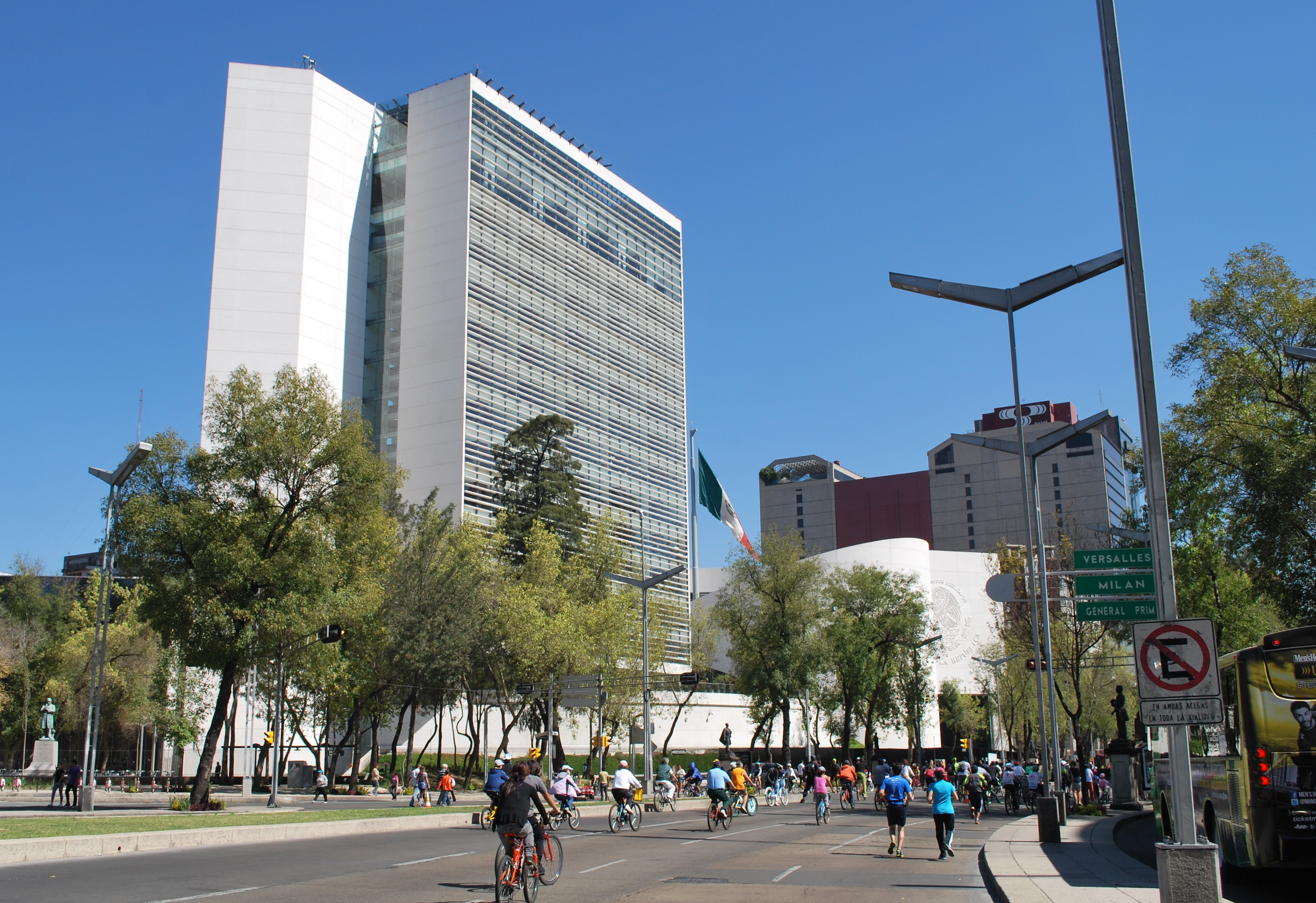
- Senate Building; Mexico City
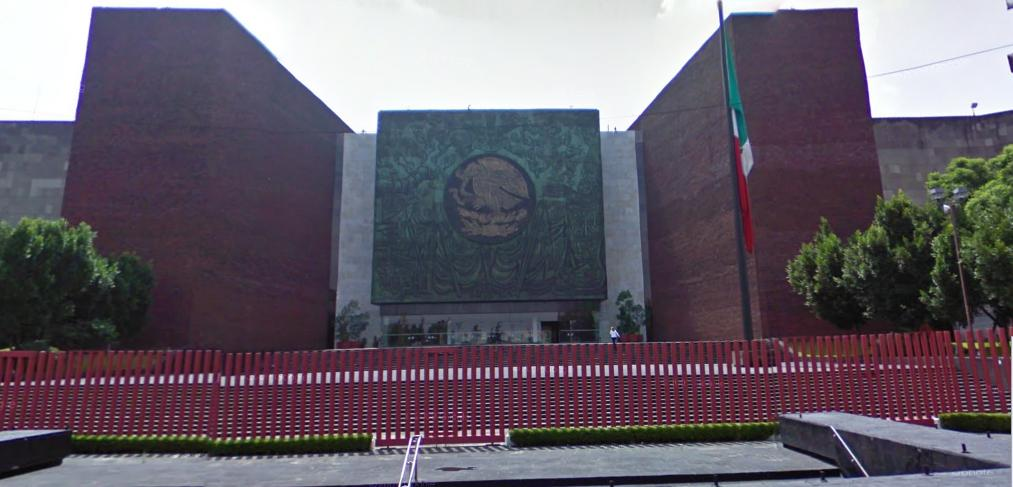
- San Lázaro Building; Mexico City

Website
- Senate website Chamber of Deputies website

Constitution
- Mexican Constitution of 1917

Rules
- "Organic Law of the General Congress of the United Mexican States" (Spanish) "Rules for the Interior Government of the General Congress of the United Mexican States" (Spanish)

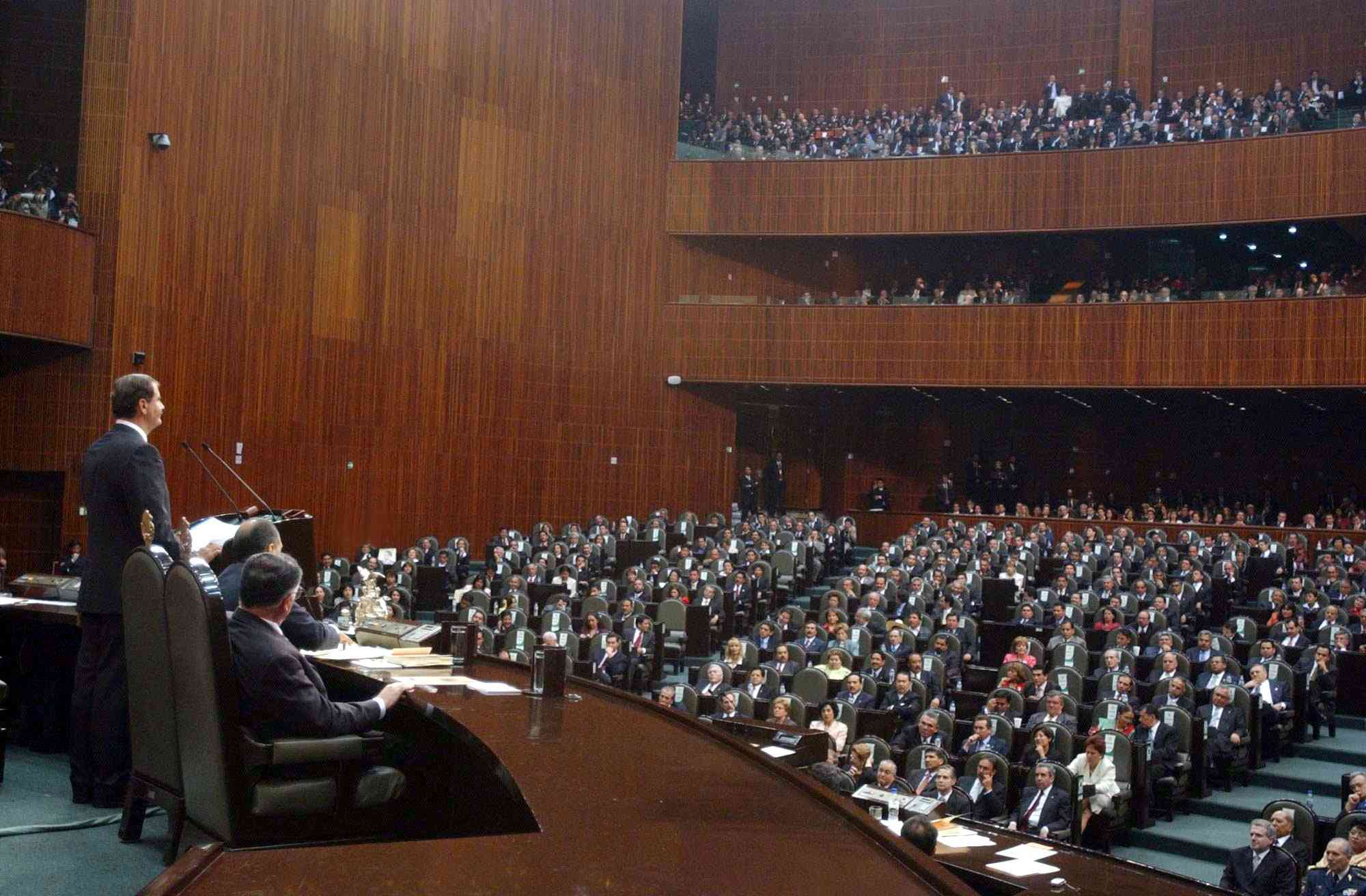
San Lázaro Building, the Chamber of Deputies, Congress of the Union

The Congress of the Union (Spanish: Congreso de la Unión, pronounced [koŋˈɡɾeso ðe lawˈnjon]), formally known as the General Congress of the United Mexican States (Congreso General de los Estados Unidos Mexicanos), is the legislature of the federal government of Mexico. It consists of two chambers: the Senate of the Republic and the Chamber of Deputies. Its 628 members (128 senators and 500 deputies) meet in Mexico City.

== Structure ==
The Congress is a bicameral body, consisting of two chambers: the Senate of the Republic and the Chamber of Deputies. Its structure and responsibilities are defined in the Third Title, Second Chapter, Articles 50 to 79 of the 1917 Constitution. The upper chamber is the Senate, Cámara de Senadores or Senado. It comprises 128 seats: 96 members are elected by plurality vote, with three members being elected in each state (two seats are awarded to the winning party or coalition and one to the first runner-up); the other 32 members are elected by proportional representation in a single country-wide constituency. Senators serve six-year terms.

The lower house is the Chamber of Deputies, or Cámara de Diputados. It has 500 seats; 300 members are elected by plurality vote and the other 200 members are elected according to proportional representation (PR), through a system of regional lists (one for each of the five constituencies established for the election by law). Deputies serve three-year terms.

The 200 PR seats are distributed generally without taking into account the 300 plurality seats (parallel voting). Since 1996, however, a party cannot get more seats overall than 8% above its result for the PR seats (a party must win 42% of the votes for the PR seats to achieve an overall majority).

There are two exceptions to that rule. A party can lose only PR seats by that rule (not plurality seats). Also, a party cannot get more than 300 seats overall (even if it has more than 52% of the votes for the PR seats).

== Powers ==
The powers invested in Congress are defined in article 73 of the Constitution. Among its powers, Congress can admit new States into the Union, alter the allocation of powers granted to the federal government, lay and collect taxes, declare war (upon request of the Government), provide for and maintain the Union's armed forces, and coordinate economic activities.

Article 74, 75 and 76 of the Constitution state that each Chamber can address specific matters. In fact, some powers are reserved either to the Chamber of Deputies or to the Chamber of Senators, making the Congress of the Union an example of imperfect bicameralism. For example, the former can approve the federal budget submitted by the Government, while the latter has the power to analyze the foreign policy of the Government, approve or dismiss the Presidential nominations of the Attorney General, Supreme Court Justices, diplomatic agents, general consuls, and senior civil and military officials.

== Permanent Committee ==
The Comisión Permanente del Congreso de la Unión, translated variously as the Permanent Committee or Standing Committee, is a body of 19 deputies and 18 senators that is responsible for tasks relating to the Congress when it is in recess.

== Term ==
It is conventional to refer to each Legislature by the Roman numeral of its term. Thus, the current Congress (whose term lasts from 2024 to 2027) is known as the "LXVI Legislature"; the previous Congress (whose term lasted from 2018 to 2021) was the "LXIV Legislature", and so forth. The I Legislature of Congress was the one that met right after the Constituent Congress that enacted the 1857 Constitution.

Early in the 20th century, the revolutionary leader Francisco I. Madero popularized the slogan Sufragio Efectivo – no Reelección ("Effective suffrage, no reelection"). In keeping with that long-held principle, and until 2014, the 1917 Constitution stated that "Deputies and Senators could not be reelected for the next immediate term".

=== Reelection ===
On February 10, 2014, Article 59 of the Mexican Constitution was amended to allow reelection to the legislative bodies for the first time. Starting with the general election of 2018, deputies and senators are allowed to run for reelection. Members of the Chamber of Deputies may serve up to four terms of three years each while members of the Senate may serve two terms of six years each; in total, members of both houses will be allowed to remain in office for a total of 12 years.

== Last election ==
=== Senate ===
Party or alliance		Constituency			Party-list			Total seats	+/–
Party or alliance		Votes	%	Seats	Votes	%	Seats	Total seats	+/–
Sigamos Haciendo Historia	National Regeneration Movement	7,526,453	13.19	21	24,484,943	42.48	14	60	+5
Sigamos Haciendo Historia	Ecologist Green Party of Mexico	2,298,726	4.03	4	5,357,959	9.30	3	14	+8
Sigamos Haciendo Historia	Labor Party	1,215,172	2.13	0	3,214,708	5.58	2	9	+3
Sigamos Haciendo Historia	Common candidates (Note: Of the elected candidates, 25 belong to the National Regeneration Movement, 7 to the Ecologist Green Party of Mexico, and 7 to the Labor Party.)	21,731,737	38.08	39				–	–
Sigamos Haciendo Historia	Total	32,772,088	57.43	64	33,057,610	57.36	19	83	+14
Fuerza y Corazón por México	National Action Party	1,148,920	2.01	1	10,107,537	17.54	6	22	–1
Fuerza y Corazón por México	Institutional Revolutionary Party	316,636	0.55	0	6,530,305	11.33	4	16	+2
Fuerza y Corazón por México	Party of the Democratic Revolution	76,082	0.13	0	1,363,012	2.36	0	2	–6
Fuerza y Corazón por México	Common candidates (Note: Of the elected candidates, 15 belong to the National Action Party, 12 to the Institutional Revolutionary Party, and 2 to the Party of the Democratic Revolution.)	16,244,373	28.47	29				–	–
Fuerza y Corazón por México	Total	17,786,011	31.17	30	18,000,854	31.23	10	40	+2
Citizens' Movement		6,460,220	11.32	2	6,528,238	11.33	3	5	–2
Non-registered candidates		46,230	0.08	0	47,092	0.08	0	0	0
Total		57,064,549	100.00	96	57,633,794	100.00	32	128	0
Valid votes		57,064,549	96.08		57,633,794	96.05			
Invalid/blank votes		2,326,742	3.92		2,369,932	3.95			
Total votes		59,391,291	100.00		60,003,726	100.00			
Source: INE (PR)

=== Chamber of Deputies ===
Party or alliance		Constituency			Party-list			Total seats	+/–
Party or alliance		Votes	%	Seats	Votes	%	Seats	Total seats	+/–
Sigamos Haciendo Historia	National Regeneration Movement	3,686,979	6.48	37	24,286,317	42.40	75	236	+38
Sigamos Haciendo Historia	Ecologist Green Party of Mexico	676,092	1.19	0	4,993,988	8.72	20	77	+34
Sigamos Haciendo Historia	Labor Party	507,604	0.89	0	3,254,718	5.68	13	51	+14
Sigamos Haciendo Historia	Common candidates (Note: Of the elected candidates, 124 belong to the National Regeneration Movement, 57 to the Ecologist Green Party of Mexico, and 38 to the Labor Party.)	27,446,014	48.26	219				–	–
Sigamos Haciendo Historia	Total	32,316,689	56.82	256	32,535,023	56.80	108	364	+86
Fuerza y Corazón por México	National Action Party	372,670	0.66	3	10,049,375	17.55	40	72	–42
Fuerza y Corazón por México	Institutional Revolutionary Party	101,574	0.18	0	6,623,796	11.56	26	35	–35
Fuerza y Corazón por México	Party of the Democratic Revolution	20,374	0.04	0	1,449,660	2.53	0	1	–14
Fuerza y Corazón por México	Common candidates (Note: Of the elected candidates, 29 belong to the National Action Party, 9 to the Institutional Revolutionary Party, and 1 to the Party of the Democratic Revolution.)	17,493,425	30.76	39				–	–
Fuerza y Corazón por México	Total	17,988,043	31.63	42	18,122,831	31.64	66	108	–91
Citizens' Movement		6,446,537	11.34	1	6,497,404	11.34	26	27	+4
Independents		72,012	0.13	1	72,012	0.13	0	1	+1
Non-registered candidates		48,871	0.09	0	49,329	0.09	0	0	0
Total		56,872,152	100.00	300	57,276,599	100.00	200	500	0
Valid votes		56,872,152	96.34		57,276,599	96.32			
Invalid/blank votes		2,162,171	3.66		2,189,869	3.68			
Total votes		59,034,323	100.00		59,466,468	100.00			
Source: INE (PR)

== See also ==
- Chamber of Deputies
- Senate of the Republic
- Politics of Mexico
- List of legislatures by country
- History of democracy in Mexico
