= 4th federal electoral district of Oaxaca =

Federal electoral district of Mexico

Oaxaca's 4th
- Electoral district of the Chamber of Deputies of Mexico

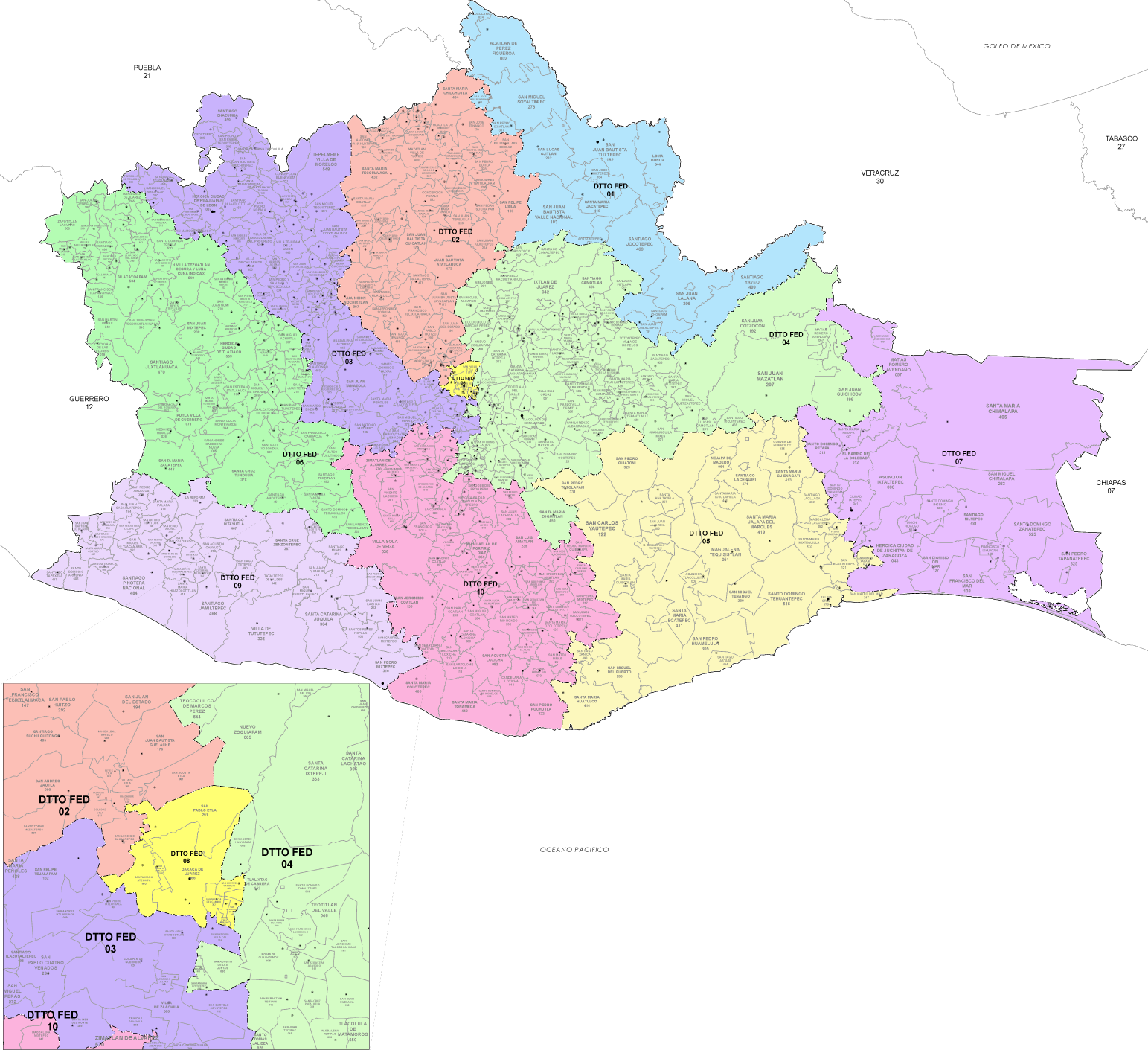
- 4th district

Incumbent
- Member: Naty Jiménez Vásquez
- Party: ▌Morena
- Congress: 66th (2024–2027)

District
- State: Oaxaca
- Head town: Tlacolula de Matamoros
- Coordinates: 16°57′N 96°28′W
- Covers: 119 municipalities
- PR region: Third
- Precincts: 303
- Population: 454,056 (2020 census)
- Indigenous: Yes (78%)

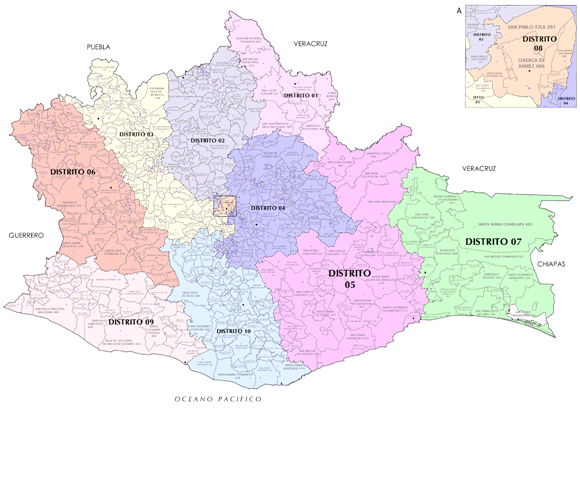
Oaxaca under the 2017–2022 districting plan

The 4th federal electoral district of Oaxaca (Spanish: Distrito electoral federal 04 de Oaxaca) is one of the 300 electoral districts into which Mexico is divided for elections to the federal Chamber of Deputies and one of 10 such districts in the state of Oaxaca.

It elects one deputy to the lower house of Congress for each three-year legislative period by means of the first-past-the-post system. Votes cast in the district also count towards the calculation of proportional representation ("plurinominal") deputies elected from the third region.

The current member for the district, elected in the 2024 general election, is Naty Poob Pijy Jiménez Vásquez of the National Regeneration Movement (Morena).

== District territory ==
Under the 2023 districting plan adopted by the National Electoral Institute (INE), which is to be used for the 2024, 2027 and 2030 federal elections, the 4th district covers 303 precincts (secciones electorales) across 119 of the state's municipalities. (Note: Oaxaca accounts for 3.3% of the country's population and 4.8% of its surface area, but it contains almost a quarter of its municipalities: 570 out of 2,446 as of 2022.)

The head town (cabecera distrital), where results from individual polling stations are gathered together and tallied, is the city of Tlacolula de Matamoros in the Valles Centrales region. The district reported a population of 454,056 in the 2020 census and, with Indigenous and Afrodescendent inhabitants accounting for over 78% of that total, it is classified by the INE as an indigenous district. (Note: The INE deems any local or federal electoral district where Indigenous or Afrodescendent inhabitants number 40% or more of the population to be an indigenous district. In the 2023 scheme, Oaxaca's 10 federal districts and 25 local districts are all indigenous.)

== Previous districting schemes ==
Evolution of electoral district numbers
	1974	1978	1996	2005	2017	2023
Oaxaca	9	10	11	11	10	10
Chamber of Deputies	196	300				

2017–2022

Oaxaca's 11th district was dissolved in the 2017 redistricting process. Under the 2017 to 2022 scheme, the 4th district had its head town at Tlacolula de Matamoros and it covered 121 municipalities.

2005–2017

Between 2005 and 2017, the district's head town was at Tlacolula de Matamoros and it comprised 113 municipalities.

1996–2005

Between 1996 and 2017, Oaxaca's seat allocation was increased to 11. Under the 1996 districting plan, the head town was at Ixtlán de Juárez in the Sierra Norte region of the state and it covered 90 municipalities.

1978–1996

The districting scheme in force from 1978 to 1996 was the result of the 1977 electoral reforms, which increased the number of single-member seats in the Chamber of Deputies from 196 to 300. Under that plan, Oaxaca's seat allocation rose from nine to ten. The 4th district had its head town at San Juan Bautista Tuxtepec in the Papaloapan region.

== Deputies returned to Congress ==
(Mexico) National parties
- Current
- PAN
- PRI
- PT
- PVEM
- MC
- Morena
- PAZ
- Somos
- Defunct or local only
- PLM
- PNR
- PRM
- PNM
- PP
- PPS
- PARM
- PFCRN
- CON
- PANAL
- PSD
- PES
- PES
- PRD

Oaxaca's 4th district
Election	Deputy	Party	Term	Legislature
1916	Luis Espinosa		1916–1917	Constituent Congress of Querétaro
...
1937	Jorge Meixueiro Hernández	Institutional Revolutionary Party	1937–1940	37th Congress
...
1979	Rosalino Porfirio López Ortiz	Institutional Revolutionary Party	1979–1982	51st Congress
1982	Odila Torres Avila	Institutional Revolutionary Party	1982–1985	52nd Congress
1985	Alberto Juan Pérez Mariscal	Institutional Revolutionary Party	1985–1988	53rd Congress
1988	Juan José Moreno Sada	Institutional Revolutionary Party	1988–1991	54th Congress
1991	Antonio Sacre Ebrahim	Institutional Revolutionary Party	1991–1994	55th Congress
1994	Rolando Hernández Castillo	Institutional Revolutionary Party	1994–1997	56th Congress
1997	Miguel Sadot Sánchez Carreño	Institutional Revolutionary Party	1997–2000	57th Congress
2000	Cándido Coheto Martínez	Institutional Revolutionary Party	2000–2003	58th Congress
2003	Jacobo Sánchez López	Institutional Revolutionary Party	2003–2006	59th Congress
2006	Carlos Martínez Martínez	Party of the Democratic Revolution	2006–2009	60th Congress
2009	Heriberto Ambrocio Cipriano	Institutional Revolutionary Party	2009–2012	61st Congress
2012	Eva Diego Cruz (Note: At the congressional session of 4 September 2012, Diego Cruz announced she was abandoning the PT benches for the PRD.)	Labour Party (Mexico) Party of the Democratic Revolution	2012–2015	62nd Congress
2015	Cándido Coheto Martínez	Institutional Revolutionary Party	2015–2018	63rd Congress
2018	Azael Santiago Chepi	National Regeneration Movement	2018–2021	64th Congress
2021	Azael Santiago Chepi	National Regeneration Movement	2021–2024	65th Congress
2024	Naty Poob Pijy Jiménez Vásquez	National Regeneration Movement	2024–2027	66th Congress

== Presidential elections ==
Oaxaca's 4th district
Election	District won by	Party or coalition	%
2018	Andrés Manuel López Obrador	Juntos Haremos Historia	67.8267
2024	Claudia Sheinbaum Pardo	Sigamos Haciendo Historia	79.3921
