= Aleida Alavez Ruiz =

Mexican politician

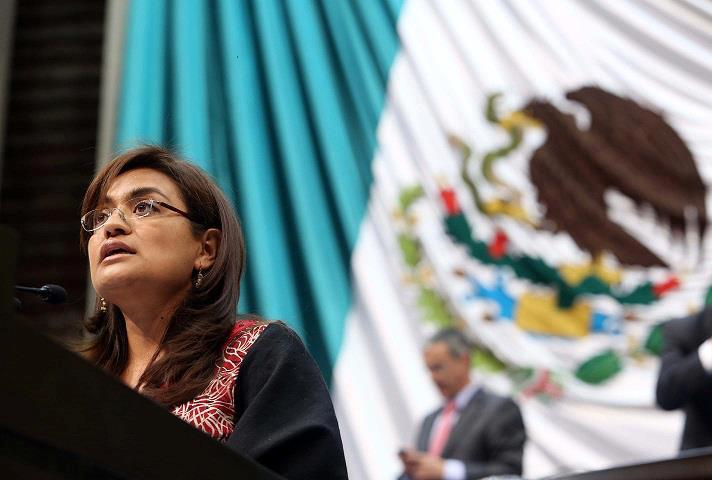

Deputy of the Congress of the Union for the 19th district of Mexico City
- Incumbent
- Assumed office 1 September 2018
- Preceded by: Jerónimo Alejandro Ojeda Anguiano
- In office 1 September 2012 – 31 August 2015
- Preceded by: Gerardo Fernández Noroña
- Succeeded by: Jerónimo Alejandro Ojeda Anguiano

Deputy of the Congress of the Union for the 17th district of Mexico City
- In office 1 September 2006 – 31 August 2009
- Preceded by: María Angélica Díaz del Campo
- Succeeded by: María Araceli Vázquez Camacho

Personal details
- Born: 10 January 1974 (age 52) Iztapalapa, Federal District, Mexico
- Party: MORENA
- Occupation: Politician

Aleida Alavez Ruiz (Note: In this Mexican name, the surname is Alavez and the second or maternal family name is Ruiz.) (born 10 January 1974) is a Mexican politician affiliated with Morena. From 2021 to 2024 she served as a deputy during the 65th Congress representing Mexico City's 19th district. She also served as a deputy during the 60th, 62nd, and 64th Congresses, the first two times as a member of the Party of the Democratic Revolution (PRD).
