= 17th federal electoral district of Mexico City =

Federal electoral district of Mexico

Mexico City's 17th
- Electoral district of the Chamber of Deputies of Mexico

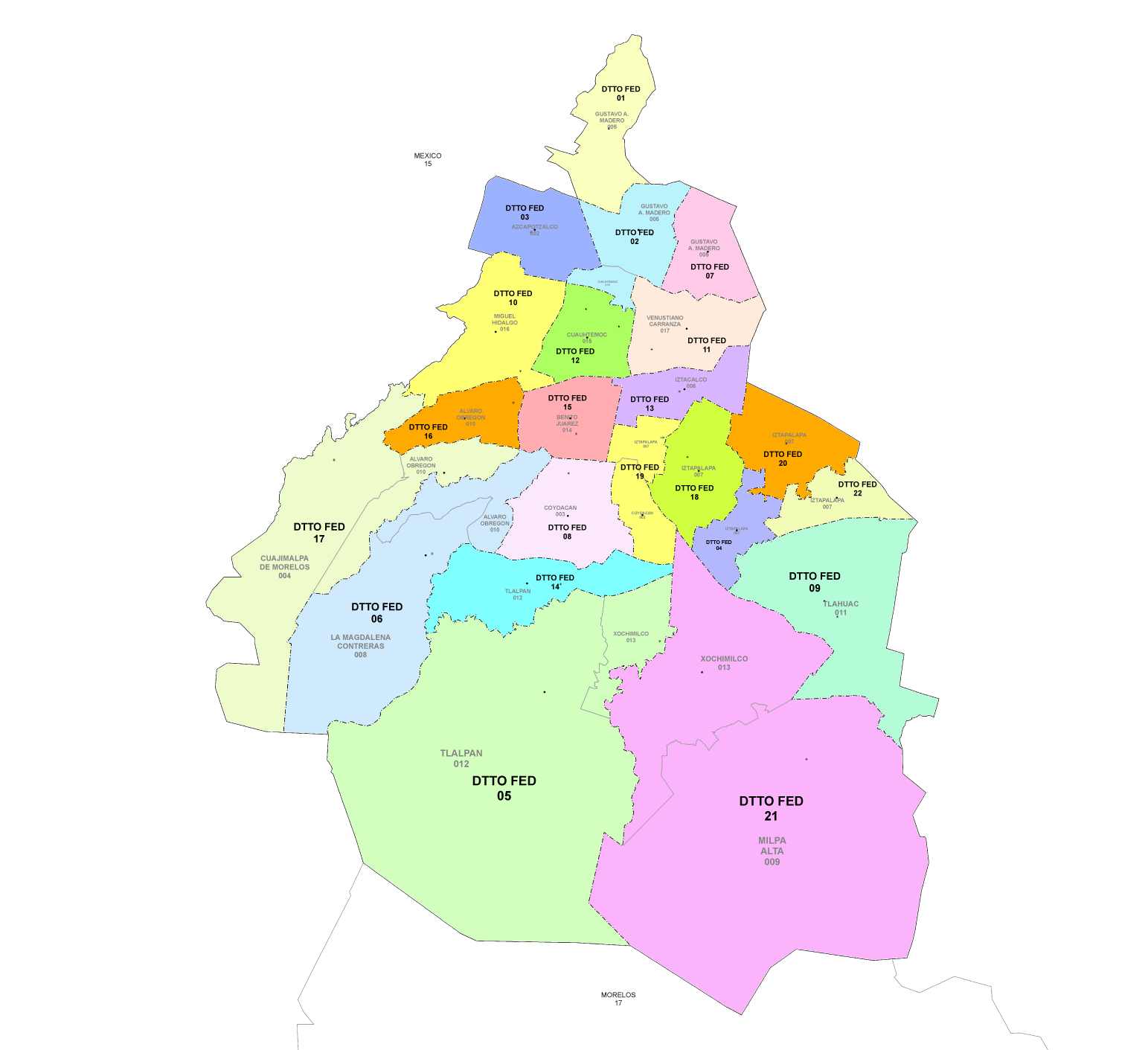
- 17th district since 2023

Incumbent
- Member: Carlos Arturo Madrazo Silva
- Party: ▌Ecologist Green Party of Mexico
- Congress: 66th (2024–2027)

District
- State: Mexico City
- Head town: Álvaro Obregón
- Coordinates: 19°21′23″N 99°14′10″W
- Covers: Álvaro Obregón (part), Cuajimalpa
- PR region: Fourth
- Precincts: 176
- Population: 423,921 (2020 census)

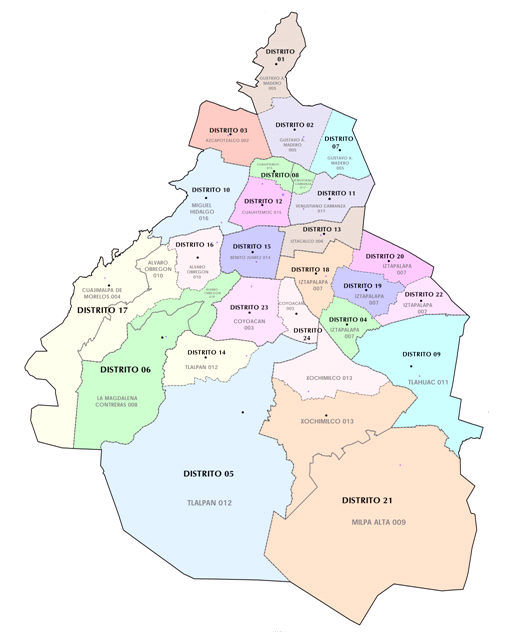
Mexico City under the 2017–2022 districting plan

The 17th federal electoral district of Mexico City (Spanish: Distrito electoral federal 17 de la Ciudad de México; prior to 2016, "of the Federal District") is one of the 300 electoral districts into which Mexico is divided for elections to the federal Chamber of Deputies and one of the 22 currently operational districts in Mexico City.

It elects one deputy to the lower house of Congress for each three-year legislative session by means of the first-past-the-post system. Votes cast in the district also count towards the calculation of proportional representation ("plurinominal") deputies elected from the fourth region.

The current member for the district, elected in the 2024 general election, is Carlos Arturo Madrazo Silva of the Ecologist Green Party of Mexico (PVEM).

== District territory ==
Under the 2023 districting plan adopted by the National Electoral Institute (INE), which is to be used for the 2024, 2027 and 2030 federal elections, the 17th district covers the whole of the borough (alcaldía) of Cuajimalpa (79 electoral precincts), plus the central portion of Álvaro Obregón (97 precincts) not covered by either the 16th or 6th districts.

The district reported a population of 423,921 in the 2020 census.

== Previous districting schemes ==
Evolution of electoral district numbers
	1974	1978	1996	2005	2017	2023
Mexico City (Federal District)	27	40	30	27	24	22
Chamber of Deputies	196	300				

2017–2022

In the 2017 plan, the 17th district comprised the whole of the borough of Cuajimalpa and 95 precincts in Álvaro Obregón.

2005–2017

Under the 2005 districting scheme, the district covered the whole of Cuajimalpa, plus that portion of Álvaro Obregón not covered by either the 16th or 26th districts.

1996–2005

Between 1996 and 2005, the district covered the whole of Cuajimalpa, plus a slice of Álvaro Obregón located in the north of the borough.

1978–1996

The districting scheme in force from 1978 to 1996 was the result of the 1977 electoral reforms, which increased the number of single-member seats in the Chamber of Deputies from 196 to 300. Under that plan, the Federal District's seat allocation rose from 27 to 40. The 17th district covered portions of the boroughs of Benito Juárez, Miguel Hidalgo and Álvaro Obregón.

== Deputies returned to Congress ==
(Mexico) National parties
- Current
- PAN
- PRI
- PT
- PVEM
- MC
- Morena
- PAZ
- Somos
- Defunct or local only
- PLM
- PNR
- PRM
- PNM
- PP
- PPS
- PARM
- PFCRN
- CON
- PANAL
- PSD
- PES
- PES
- PRD

Mexico City's 17th district
Election	Deputy	Party	Term	Legislature
1952	Alfonso Martínez Domínguez	Institutional Revolutionary Party	1952–1955	42nd Congress
1955	Alfonso Ituarte Servín	National Action Party (Mexico)	1955–1958	43rd Congress
1958	Gonzalo Peña Manterola	Institutional Revolutionary Party	1958–1961	44th Congress
1961	Gonzalo Castellot Madrazo	Institutional Revolutionary Party	1961–1964	45th Congress
1964	Alejandro Carrillo Marcor	Institutional Revolutionary Party	1964–1967	46th Congress
1967	Raúl Noriega Ondovilla	Institutional Revolutionary Party	1967–1970	47th Congress
1970	Cuauhtémoc Santa Ana Senthe	Institutional Revolutionary Party	1970–1973	48th Congress
1973	Humberto Mateos Gómez	Institutional Revolutionary Party	1973–1976	49th Congress
1976	Héctor Hernández Casanova	Institutional Revolutionary Party	1976–1979	50th Congress
1979	Rubén Figueroa Alcocer	Institutional Revolutionary Party	1979–1982	51st Congress
1982	Guillermo Dávila Martínez	Institutional Revolutionary Party	1982–1985	52nd Congress
1985	Guillermo Fonseca Álvarez	Institutional Revolutionary Party	1985–1988	53rd Congress
1988	José Luis Luege Tamargo	National Action Party (Mexico)	1988–1991	54th Congress
1991	Everardo Javier Garduño Pérez	Institutional Revolutionary Party	1991–1994	55th Congress
1994	Sebastián Lerdo de Tejada Covarrubias	Institutional Revolutionary Party	1994–1997	56th Congress
1997	Francisco de Souza Machorro	Party of the Democratic Revolution	1997–2000	57th Congress
2000	Sara Guadalupe Figueroa Canedo	Ecologist Green Party of Mexico	2000–2003	58th Congress
2003	María Angélica Díaz del Campo	Party of the Democratic Revolution	2003–2006	59th Congress
2006	Aleida Alavez Ruiz	Party of the Democratic Revolution	2006–2009	60th Congress
2009	María Araceli Vázquez Camacho	Party of the Democratic Revolution	2009–2012	61st Congress
2012	Fernando Zárate Salgado	Party of the Democratic Revolution	2012–2015	62nd Congress
2015	Paola Félix Díaz	National Regeneration Movement	2015–2018	63rd Congress
2018	Francisco Javier Saldívar Camacho	Social Encounter Party	2018–2021	64th Congress
2021	Jorge Triana Tena	National Action Party (Mexico)	2021–2024	65th Congress
2024	Carlos Arturo Madrazo Silva	Ecologist Green Party of Mexico	2024–2027	66th Congress

== Presidential elections ==
Mexico City's 17th district
Election	District won by	Party or coalition	%
2018	Andrés Manuel López Obrador	Juntos Haremos Historia	51.4510
2024	Claudia Sheinbaum Pardo	Sigamos Haciendo Historia	50.7466
