= Sofía Castro Ríos =

Mexican lawyer and politician (born 1970)

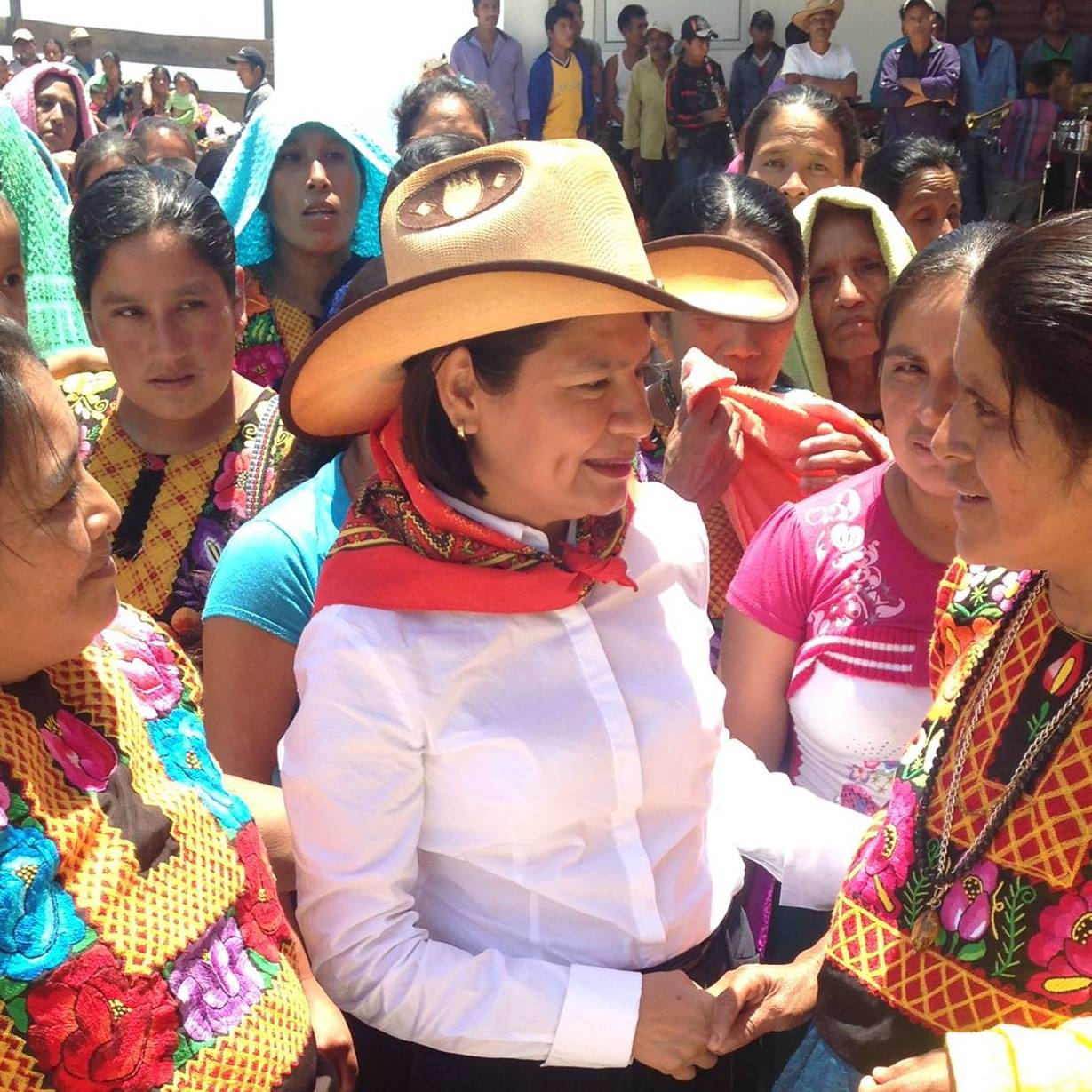
- Born: 18 September 1970 (age 55); San Carlos Yautepec, Oaxaca, Mexico
- Education: UABJO
- Occupations: Lawyer and politician
- Political party: PRI

Sofía Castro Ríos (born 18 September 1970) is a Mexican lawyer and politician affiliated with the Institutional Revolutionary Party (PRI).

She has been elected to the Chamber of Deputies for the fifth district of Oaxaca on two occasions: in the 2003 mid-terms and in the 2009 mid-terms.

Castro Ríos was the joint candidate of the PRI, the National Action Party (PAN) and the Party of the Democratic Revolution (PRD) for Oaxaca's fifth in the 2021 mid-terms but lost to Carol Antonio Altamirano of the National Regeneration Movement (Morena).
