= 7th federal electoral district of Oaxaca =

Federal electoral district of Mexico

Oaxaca's 7th
- Electoral district of the Chamber of Deputies of Mexico

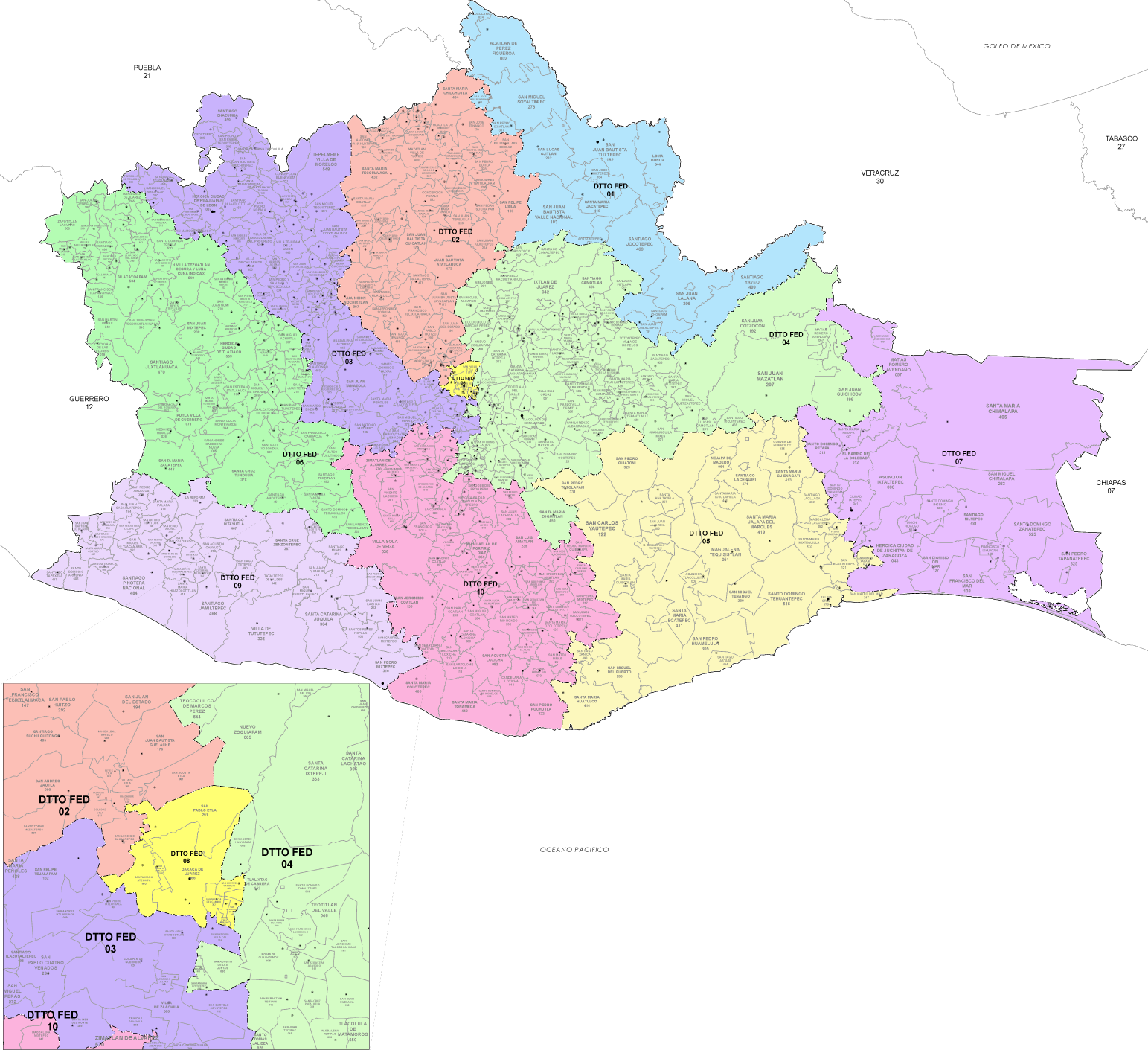
- 7th district

Incumbent
- Member: Gloria Sánchez López
- Party: ▌Morena
- Congress: 66th (2024–2027)

District
- State: Oaxaca
- Head town: Ciudad Ixtepec
- Coordinates: 16°34′N 95°06′W
- Covers: 22 municipalities
- PR region: Third
- Precincts: 224
- Population: 354,789 (2020 census)
- Indigenous: Yes (73%)

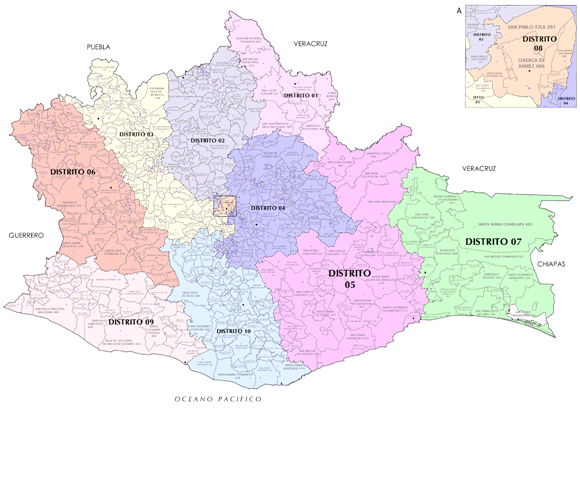
Oaxaca under the 2017–2022 districting plan

The 7th federal electoral district of Oaxaca (Spanish: Distrito electoral federal 07 de Oaxaca) is one of the 300 electoral districts into which Mexico is divided for elections to the federal Chamber of Deputies and one of 10 such districts in the state of Oaxaca.

It elects one deputy to the lower house of Congress for each three-year legislative period by means of the first-past-the-post system. Votes cast in the district also count towards the calculation of proportional representation ("plurinominal") deputies elected from the third region.

The current member for the district, elected in the 2024 general election, is Gloria Sánchez López of the National Regeneration Movement (Morena).

== District territory ==
Under the 2023 districting plan adopted by the National Electoral Institute (INE), which is to be used for the 2024, 2027 and 2030 federal elections, the 7th district covers 224 precincts (secciones electorales) across 22 of the state's municipalities. (Note: Oaxaca accounts for 3.3% of the country's population and 4.8% of its surface area, but it contains almost a quarter of its municipalities: 570 out of 2,446 as of 2022.)

The head town (cabecera distrital), where results from individual polling stations are gathered together and tallied, is the city of Ciudad Ixtepec in the Istmo de Tehuantepec region. The district reported a population of 354,789 in the 2020 census and, with Indigenous and Afrodescendent inhabitants accounting for over 73% of that total, it is classified by the INE as an indigenous district. (Note: The INE deems any local or federal electoral district where Indigenous or Afrodescendent inhabitants number 40% or more of the total to be an indigenous district. In the 2023 scheme, Oaxaca's 10 federal districts and 25 local districts are all indigenous.)

== Previous districting schemes ==
Evolution of electoral district numbers
| | 1974 | 1978 | 1996 | 2005 | 2017 | 2023 |
|---|---|---|---|---|---|---|
| Oaxaca | 9 | 10 | 11 | 11 | 10 | 10 |
| Chamber of Deputies | 196 | 300 | | | | |

2017–2022

Oaxaca's 11th district was dissolved in the 2017 redistricting process. Under the 2017 to 2022 scheme, the 7th district had its head town at Ciudad Ixtepec and it covered 24 municipalities.

2005–2017

Between 2005 and 2017, the district's head town was at Juchitán de Zaragoza and it comprised 22 municipalities.

1996–2005

Between 1996 and 2017, Oaxaca's seat allocation was increased to 11. Under the 1996 districting plan, the head town was at Juchitán de Zaragoza and it covered 22 municipalities.

1978–1996

The districting scheme in force from 1978 to 1996 was the result of the 1977 electoral reforms, which increased the number of single-member seats in the Chamber of Deputies from 196 to 300. Under that plan, Oaxaca's seat allocation rose from nine to ten. The 7th district had its head town at Tlaxiaco in the Mixteca region.

== Deputies returned to Congress ==
(Mexico) National parties
- Current
- PAN
- PRI
- PT
- PVEM
- MC
- Morena
- PAZ
- Somos
- Defunct or local only
- PLM
- PNR
- PRM
- PNM
- PP
- PPS
- PARM
- PFCRN
- CON
- PANAL
- PSD
- PES
- PES
- PRD

Oaxaca's 7th district
| Election | Deputy | Party | Term | Legislature |
|---|---|---|---|---|
| 1973 | José Murat Casab | Institutional Revolutionary Party | 1973–1976 | 49th Congress |
| 1976 | Zoraida Bernal de Vadillo | Institutional Revolutionary Party | 1976–1979 | 50th Congress |
| 1979 | Aurelio Mora Contreras | Institutional Revolutionary Party | 1979–1982 | 51st Congress |
| 1982 | Antonio Fabila Meléndez | Institutional Revolutionary Party | 1982–1985 | 52nd Congress |
| 1985 | Patricia Villanueva Abrajam | Institutional Revolutionary Party | 1985–1988 | 53rd Congress |
| 1988 | María Teresa Chagoya Méndez | Institutional Revolutionary Party | 1988–1991 | 54th Congress |
| 1991 | Antonia Irma Piñeyra Arias | Institutional Revolutionary Party | 1991–1994 | 55th Congress |
| 1994 | Francisco Andrés Bolaños Bolaños | Party of the Democratic Revolution | 1994–1997 | 56th Congress |
| 1997 | Vicente de la Cruz Santiago | Institutional Revolutionary Party | 1997–2000 | 57th Congress |
| 2000 | Abel Trejo González | Institutional Revolutionary Party | 2000–2003 | 58th Congress |
| 2003 | José Guzmán Santos | Institutional Revolutionary Party | 2003–2006 | 59th Congress |
| 2006 | Jorge Toledo Luis (Note: Toledo Luis resigned his seat on 11 January 2009.); Daniel Gurrión Matías | Institutional Revolutionary Party | 2006–2009; 2009 | 60th Congress |
| 2009 | Emilio Mendoza Kaplan | Institutional Revolutionary Party | 2009–2012 | 61st Congress |
| 2012 | Samuel Gurrión Matías | Institutional Revolutionary Party | 2012–2015 | 62nd Congress |
| 2015 | Yarith Tannos Cruz | Institutional Revolutionary Party | 2015–2018 | 63rd Congress |
| 2018 | Rosalinda Domínguez Flores | National Regeneration Movement | 2018–2021 | 64th Congress |
| 2021 | José Antonio Estefan Gillessen | Ecologist Green Party of Mexico | 2021–2024 | 65th Congress |
| 2024 | Gloria Sánchez López | National Regeneration Movement | 2024–2027 | 66th Congress |

== Presidential elections ==
Oaxaca's 7th district
| Election | District won by | Party or coalition | % |
|---|---|---|---|
| 2018 | Andrés Manuel López Obrador | Juntos Haremos Historia | 65.6614 |
| 2024 | Claudia Sheinbaum Pardo | Sigamos Haciendo Historia | 83.8016 |
