= 5th federal electoral district of Oaxaca =

Federal electoral district of Mexico

Oaxaca's 5th
- Electoral district of the Chamber of Deputies of Mexico

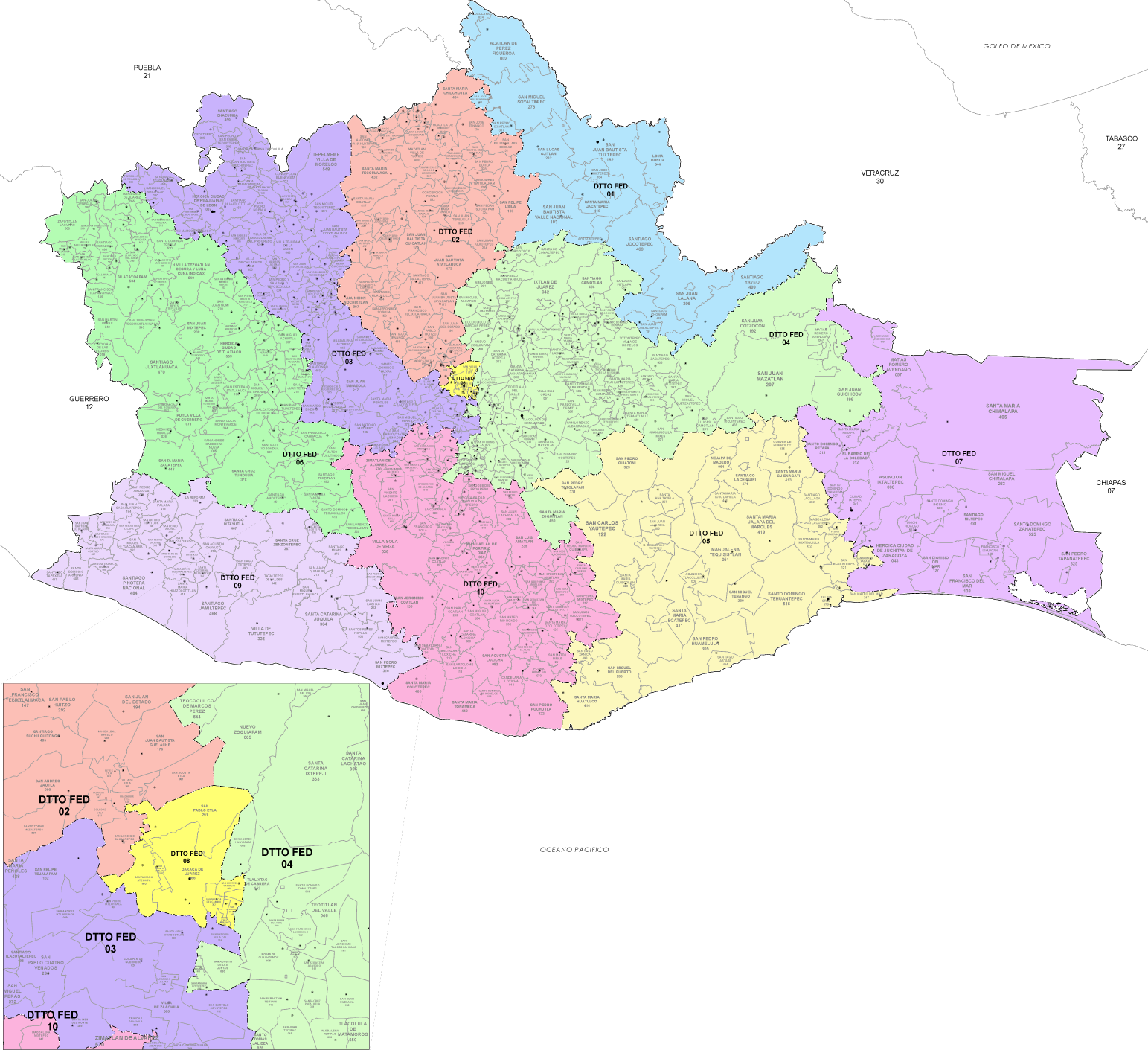
- 5th district

Incumbent
- Member: Carol Antonio Altamirano
- Party: ▌Morena
- Congress: 66th (2024–2027)

District
- State: Oaxaca
- Head town: Salina Cruz
- Coordinates: 16°10′N 95°12′W
- Covers: 32 municipalities
- PR region: Third
- Precincts: 202
- Population: 366,861 (2020 census)
- Indigenous: Yes (64%)

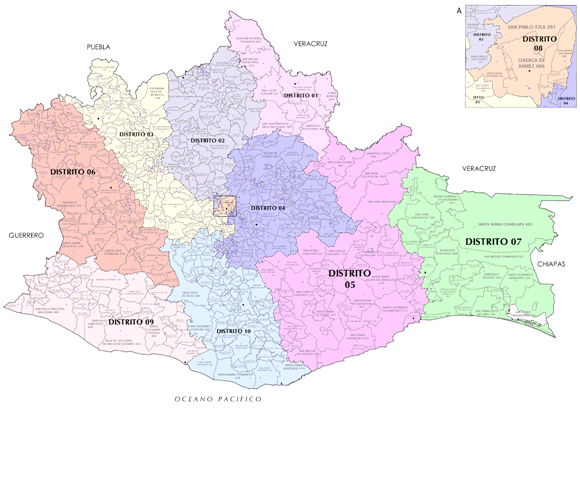
Oaxaca under the 2017–2022 districting plan

The 5th federal electoral district of Oaxaca (Spanish: Distrito electoral federal 05 de Oaxaca) is one of the 300 electoral districts into which Mexico is divided for elections to the federal Chamber of Deputies and one of 10 such districts in the state of Oaxaca.

It elects one deputy to the lower house of Congress for each three-year legislative period by means of the first-past-the-post system. Votes cast in the district also count towards the calculation of proportional representation ("plurinominal") deputies elected from the third region.

The current member for the district, re-elected in the 2024 general election, is Carol Antonio Altamirano of the National Regeneration Movement (Morena).

== District territory ==
Under the 2023 districting plan adopted by the National Electoral Institute (INE), which is to be used for the 2024, 2027 and 2030 federal elections, the 5th district covers 202 precincts (secciones electorales) across 32 of the state's municipalities. (Note: Oaxaca accounts for 3.3% of the country's population and 4.8% of its surface area, but it contains almost a quarter of its municipalities: 570 out of 2,446 as of 2022.)

The head town (cabecera distrital), where results from individual polling stations are gathered together and tallied, is the port city of Salina Cruz on the Isthmus of Tehuantepec. The district reported a population of 366,861 in the 2020 census and, with Indigenous and Afrodescendent inhabitants accounting for over 64% of that total, it is classified by the INE as an indigenous district. (Note: The INE deems any local or federal electoral district where Indigenous or Afrodescendent inhabitants number 40% or more of the population to be an indigenous district. In the 2023 scheme, Oaxaca's 10 federal districts and 25 local districts are all indigenous.)

== Previous districting schemes ==
Evolution of electoral district numbers
	1974	1978	1996	2005	2017	2023
Oaxaca	9	10	11	11	10	10
Chamber of Deputies	196	300				

2017–2022

Oaxaca's 11th district was dissolved in the 2017 redistricting process. Under the 2017 to 2022 scheme, the 5th district had its head town at Salina Cruz and it covered 45 municipalities.

2005–2017

Between 2005 and 2017, the district's head town was at Santo Domingo Tehuantepec, also in the Istmo de Tehuantepec region, and it comprised 26 municipalities.

1996–2005

Between 1996 and 2017, Oaxaca's seat allocation was increased to 11. Under the 1996 districting plan, the head town was at Santo Domingo Tehuantepec and it covered 33 municipalities.

1978–1996

The districting scheme in force from 1978 to 1996 was the result of the 1977 electoral reforms, which increased the number of single-member seats in the Chamber of Deputies from 196 to 300. Under that plan, Oaxaca's seat allocation rose from nine to ten. The 5th district had its head town at Huautla de Jiménez in the Cañada region.

== Deputies returned to Congress ==
(Mexico) National parties
- Current
- PAN
- PRI
- PT
- PVEM
- MC
- Morena
- PAZ
- Somos
- Defunct or local only
- PLM
- PNR
- PRM
- PNM
- PP
- PPS
- PARM
- PFCRN
- CON
- PANAL
- PSD
- PES
- PES
- PRD

Oaxaca's 5th district
Election	Deputy	Party	Term	Legislature
...
1928	Jorge Meixueiro Hernández		1928–1930	33rd Congress
...
1979	Genoveva Medina de Márquez	Institutional Revolutionary Party	1979–1982	51st Congress
1982	Luis Martínez Fernández del Campo	Institutional Revolutionary Party	1982–1985	52nd Congress
1985	Rodolfo Linares González	Institutional Revolutionary Party	1985–1988	53rd Congress
1988	Diódoro Carrasco Palacios	Institutional Revolutionary Party	1988–1991	54th Congress
1991	Armando David Palacios García	Institutional Revolutionary Party	1991–1994	55th Congress
1994	Virginia Hernández Hernández	Institutional Revolutionary Party	1994–1997	56th Congress
1997	José Antonio Estefan Garfias	Institutional Revolutionary Party	1997–2000	57th Congress
2000	Bulmaro Rito Salinas (Note: Rito Salinas resigned his seat on 7 August 2002.); Edith Escobar Camacho	Institutional Revolutionary Party	2000–2002; 2002–2003	58th Congress
2003	Sofía Castro Ríos	Institutional Revolutionary Party	2003–2006	59th Congress
2006	Carlos Altamirano Toledo	Party of the Democratic Revolution	2006–2009	60th Congress
2009	Sofía Castro Ríos	Institutional Revolutionary Party	2009–2012	61st Congress
2012	Carol Antonio Altamirano	Party of the Democratic Revolution	2012–2015	62nd Congress
2015	José Antonio Estefan Garfias	Party of the Democratic Revolution	2015–2018	63rd Congress
2018	Carol Antonio Altamirano	National Regeneration Movement	2018–2021	64th Congress
2021	Carol Antonio Altamirano	National Regeneration Movement	2021–2024	65th Congress
2024	Carol Antonio Altamirano	National Regeneration Movement	2024–2027	66th Congress

== Presidential elections ==
Oaxaca's 5th district
Election	District won by	Party or coalition	%
2018	Andrés Manuel López Obrador	Juntos Haremos Historia	74.1850
2024	Claudia Sheinbaum Pardo	Sigamos Haciendo Historia	85.0526
