= 19th federal electoral district of Mexico City =

Federal electoral district of Mexico

Mexico City's 19th
- Electoral district of the Chamber of Deputies of Mexico

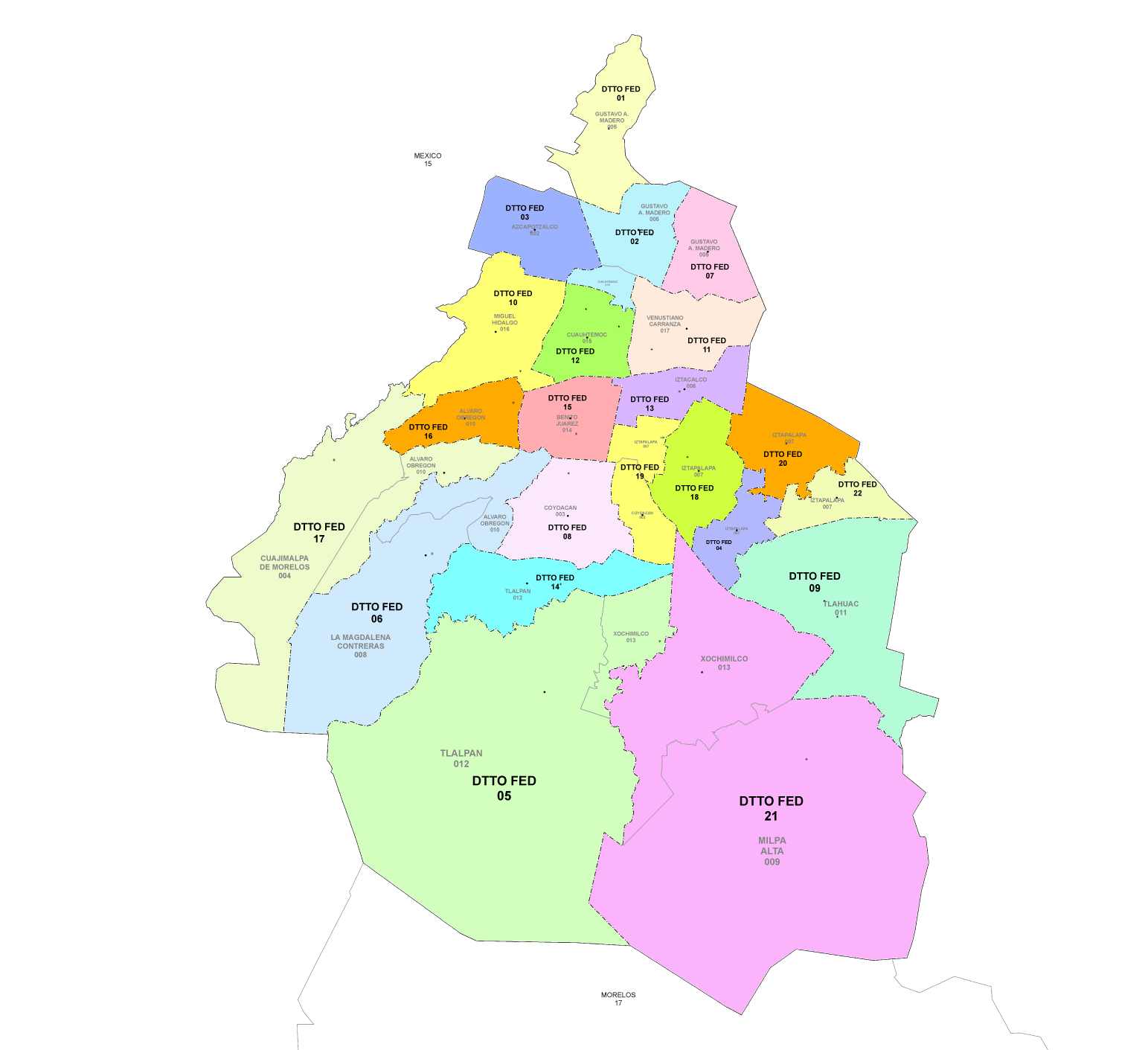
- 19th district since 2023

Incumbent
- Member: Héctor Saúl Téllez Hernández
- Party: ▌National Action Party
- Congress: 66th (2024–2027)

District
- State: Mexico City
- Head town: Coyoacán
- Coordinates: 19°21′00″N 99°09′44″W
- Covers: Coyoacán (part), Iztapalapa (part)
- PR region: Fourth
- Precincts: 275
- Population: 369,360 (2020 census)

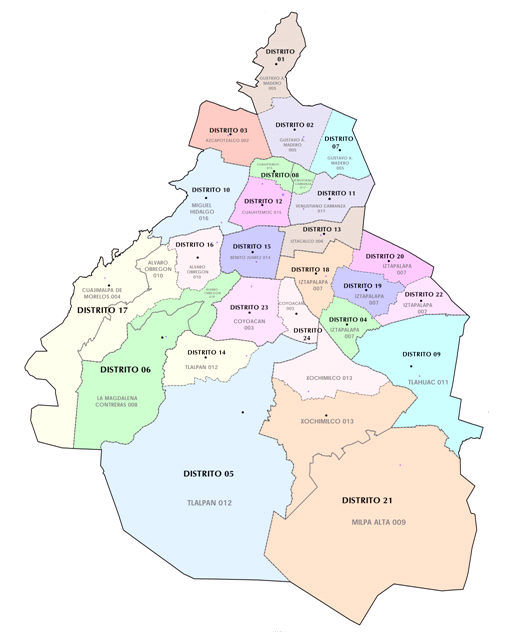
Mexico City under the 2017–2022 districting plan

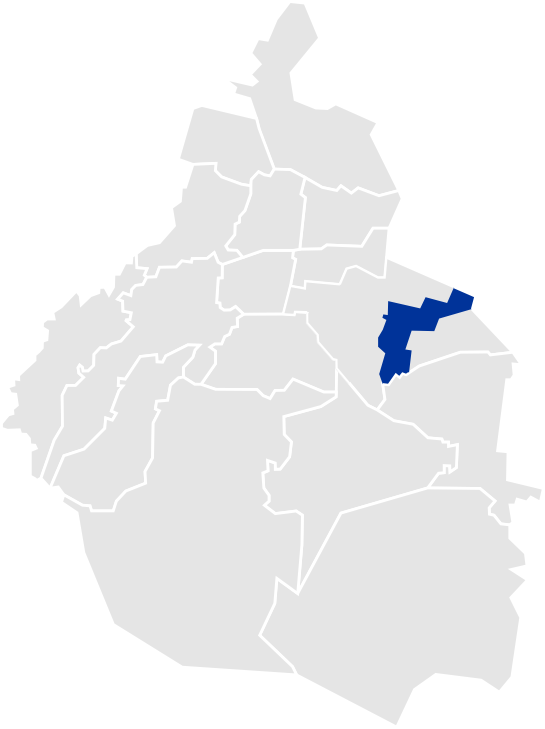
2005–2017 nineteenth district shaded blue

The 19th federal electoral district of Mexico City (Spanish: Distrito electoral federal 19 de la Ciudad de México; previously "of the Federal District") is one of the 300 electoral districts into which Mexico is divided for elections to the federal Chamber of Deputies and one of the 22 currently operational districts in Mexico City.

It elects one deputy to the lower house of Congress for each three-year legislative session by means of the first-past-the-post system. Votes cast in the district also count towards the calculation of proportional representation ("plurinominal") deputies elected from the fourth region.

The current member for the district, elected in the 2024 general election, is Héctor Saúl Téllez Hernández of the National Action Party (PAN).

== District territory ==
Under the 2023 districting plan adopted by the National Electoral Institute (INE), which is to be used for the 2024, 2027 and 2030 federal elections, the 19th district covers the eastern portion of the borough (alcaldía) of Coyoacán excluded from the 8th district and the adjacent westernmost part of Iztapalapa, for a total of 275 electoral precincts (secciones electorales).

The district reported a population of 369,360 in the 2020 census.

== Previous districting schemes ==
Evolution of electoral district numbers
	1974	1978	1996	2005	2017	2023
Mexico City (Federal District)	27	40	30	27	24	22
Chamber of Deputies	196	300				

2017–2022

In the 2017 plan, the 19th district comprised 226 precincts in the central part of Iztapalapa.

2005–2017

Between 2005 and 2017, the district covered 164 precincts in the east of Iztapalapa.

1996–2005

Under the 1996 scheme, the district covered 174 precincts in the east of Iztapalapa.

1978–1996

The districting scheme in force from 1978 to 1996 was the result of the 1977 electoral reforms, which increased the number of single-member seats in the Chamber of Deputies from 196 to 300. Under that plan, the Federal District's seat allocation rose from 27 to 40. The 19th district was located in the borough of Azcapotzalco.

== Deputies returned to Congress ==
(Mexico) National parties
- Current
- PAN
- PRI
- PT
- PVEM
- MC
- Morena
- PAZ
- Somos
- Defunct or local only
- PLM
- PNR
- PRM
- PNM
- PP
- PPS
- PARM
- PFCRN
- CON
- PANAL
- PSD
- PES
- PES
- PRD

Mexico City's 19th district
Election	Deputy	Party	Term	Legislature
1952	Manuel Marcué Pardiñas	Institutional Revolutionary Party	1952–1955	42nd Congress
1955	Marcelino Murrieta Carreto	Institutional Revolutionary Party	1955–1958	43rd Congress
1958	Emiliano Aguilar Garcés	Institutional Revolutionary Party	1958–1961	44th Congress
1961	Salvador Carrillo Echeveste	Institutional Revolutionary Party	1961–1964	45th Congress
1964	Salvador Padilla Flores	Institutional Revolutionary Party	1964–1967	46th Congress
1967	Adolfo Ruiz Sosa	Institutional Revolutionary Party	1967–1970	47th Congress
1970	Hilda Anderson Nevárez	Institutional Revolutionary Party	1970–1973	48th Congress
1973	Alejandro Ruiz Zavala	Institutional Revolutionary Party	1973–1976	49th Congress
1976	Abraham Martínez Rivero	Institutional Revolutionary Party	1976–1979	50th Congress
1979	Francisco Simeano y Chávez	Institutional Revolutionary Party	1979–1982	51st Congress
1982	Sara Villalpando Núñez	Institutional Revolutionary Party	1982–1985	52nd Congress
1985	Luis Manuel Altamirano Cuadros	Institutional Revolutionary Party	1985–1988	53rd Congress
1988	Eleazar Cervantes Medina	National Action Party (Mexico)	1988–1991	54th Congress
1991	Eduardo Francisco Trejo González	Institutional Revolutionary Party	1991–1994	55th Congress
1994	Jaime Mariano del Río Navarro (Note: Mariano del Río Navarro resigned his seat on 10 April 1997 to take up a position with the federal government; he was replaced by his alternate for the remainder of his term.); José Luis Zanela Sierra	Institutional Revolutionary Party	1994–1997	56th Congress
1997	Esperanza Villalobos Pérez	Party of the Democratic Revolution	1997–2000	57th Congress
2000	Alfredo Hernández Raigosa	Party of the Democratic Revolution	2000–2003	58th Congress
2003	María Elba Garfias	Party of the Democratic Revolution	2003–2006	59th Congress
2006	Silvia Oliva Fragoso	Party of the Democratic Revolution	2006–2009	60th Congress
2009	Gerardo Fernández Noroña	Labour Party (Mexico)	2009–2012	61st Congress
2012	Aleida Alavez Ruiz	Party of the Democratic Revolution	2012–2015	62nd Congress
2015	Jerónimo Alejandro Ojeda Anguiano	Party of the Democratic Revolution	2015–2018	63rd Congress
2018	Aleida Alavez Ruiz	National Regeneration Movement	2018–2021	64th Congress
2021	Aleida Alavez Ruiz	National Regeneration Movement	2021–2024	65th Congress
2024	Héctor Saúl Téllez Hernández	National Action Party (Mexico)	2024–2027	66th Congress

== Presidential elections ==
Mexico City's 19th district
Election	District won by	Party or coalition	%
2018	Andrés Manuel López Obrador	Juntos Haremos Historia	63.3042
2024	Claudia Sheinbaum Pardo	Sigamos Haciendo Historia	45.5759
