= Raúl Bolaños =

Raúl Bolaños may refer to:

- Raúl Bolanos Cacho Güendulain (1916–1984), Mexican politician, president of the Chamber of Deputies in 1955, father of:
- Raúl Bolaños Cacho Guzmán (born 1948), Mexican politician, deputy for the 3rd federal electoral district of Oaxaca in 1988–1991, father of:
- Raúl Bolaños Cacho Cué (born 1988), Mexican politician
