= 2nd federal electoral district of Oaxaca =

Federal electoral district of Mexico

Oaxaca's 2nd
- Electoral district of the Chamber of Deputies of Mexico

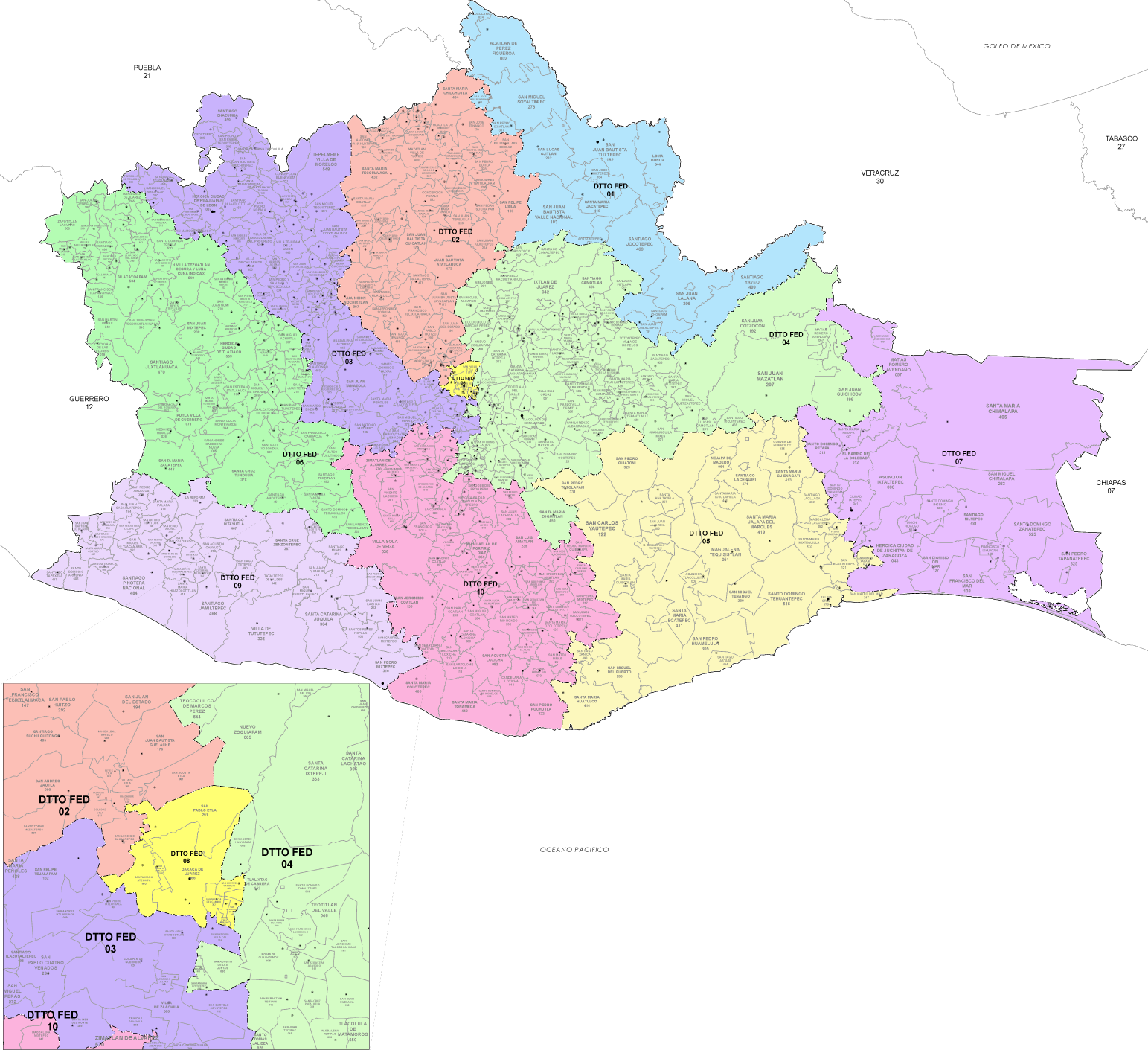
- 2nd district

Incumbent
- Member: Irma Juan Carlos
- Party: ▌Morena
- Congress: 66th (2024–2027)

District
- State: Oaxaca
- Head town: Teotitlán de Flores Magón
- Coordinates: 18°08′N 97°05′W
- Covers: 74 municipalities
- PR region: Third
- Precincts: 251
- Population: 386,221 (2020 census)
- Indigenous: Yes (73%)

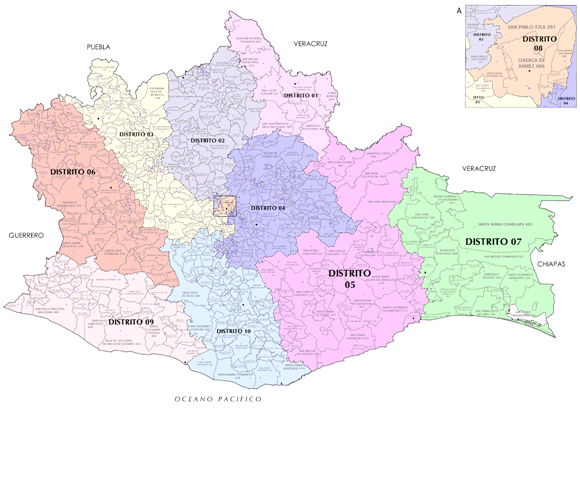
Oaxaca under the 2017–2022 districting plan

The 2nd federal electoral district of Oaxaca (Spanish: Distrito electoral federal 02 de Oaxaca) is one of the 300 electoral districts into which Mexico is divided for elections to the federal Chamber of Deputies and one of 10 such districts in the state of Oaxaca.

It elects one deputy to the lower house of Congress for each three-year legislative period by means of the first-past-the-post system. Votes cast in the district also count towards the calculation of proportional representation ("plurinominal") deputies elected from the third region.

The current member for the district, re-elected in the 2024 general election, is Irma Juan Carlos of the National Regeneration Movement (Morena).

== District territory ==
Under the 2023 districting plan adopted by the National Electoral Institute (INE), which is to be used for the 2024, 2027 and 2030 federal elections, the 2nd district comprises 251 precincts (secciones electorales) across 74 of the state's municipalities in the Cañada region and neighbouring areas. (Note: Oaxaca accounts for 3.3% of the country's population and 4.8% of its surface area, but it contains almost a quarter of its municipalities: 570 out of 2,446 as of 2022.)

The head town (cabecera distrital), where results from individual polling stations are gathered together and tallied, is the city of Teotitlán de Flores Magón. The district reported a population of 386,221 in the 2020 census and, with Indigenous and Afrodescendent inhabitants accounting for over 73% of that total, it is classified by the INE as an indigenous district. (Note: The INE deems any local or federal electoral district where Indigenous or Afrodescendent inhabitants number 40% or more of the total population to be an indigenous district. In the 2023 scheme, Oaxaca's 10 federal districts and 25 local districts are all indigenous.)

== Previous districting schemes ==
Evolution of electoral district numbers
	1974	1978	1996	2005	2017	2023
Oaxaca	9	10	11	11	10	10
Chamber of Deputies	196	300				

2005–2017

Under the scheme in force from 2017 to 2022, the 2nd district had its head town at Teotitlán de Flores Magón and it covered 76 municipalities.

2005–2017

Between 2005 and 2017, the district's head town was at Teotitlán de Flores Magón and it comprised 51 municipalities.

1996–2005

Between 1996 and 2017, Oaxaca's seat allocation was increased to 11. Under the 1996 districting plan, the head town was at Teotitlán de Flores Magón and it covered 68 municipalities.

1978–1996

The districting scheme in force from 1978 to 1996 was the result of the 1977 electoral reforms, which increased the number of single-member seats in the Chamber of Deputies from 196 to 300. Under that plan, Oaxaca's seat allocation rose from nine to ten. The 2nd district had its head town at Ixtlán de Juárez in the Sierra Norte de Oaxaca.

== Deputies returned to Congress ==
(Mexico) National parties
- Current
- PAN
- PRI
- PT
- PVEM
- MC
- Morena
- PAZ
- Somos
- Defunct or local only
- PLM
- PNR
- PRM
- PNM
- PP
- PPS
- PARM
- PFCRN
- CON
- PANAL
- PSD
- PES
- PES
- PRD

Oaxaca's 2nd district
Election	Deputy	Party	Term	Legislature
1916	Israel del Castillo		1916–1917	Constituent Congress of Querétaro
...
1940	Manuel Rueda Magro		1940–1943	38th Congress
1943	Election annulled (Note: Annulled on 12 November 1943 following Jorge Meixueiro Hernández's death by suicide over the disputed result on 18 August.)		1943–1946	39th Congress
1946	Francisco Eli Sigüenza	Institutional Revolutionary Party	1946–1949	40th Congress
1949	Ernesto Meixueiro Hernández	Institutional Revolutionary Party	1949–1952	41st Congress
1952	Eustorgio Cruz Aguilar	Institutional Revolutionary Party	1952–1955	42nd Congress
1955	Graciano Federico Hernández López	Institutional Revolutionary Party	1955–1958	43rd Congress
1958	Jenaro Maldonado Matías	Institutional Revolutionary Party	1958–1961	44th Congress
1961	Manuel Orozco Mendoza	Institutional Revolutionary Party	1961–1964	45th Congress
1964	Eliseo Jiménez Ruiz	Institutional Revolutionary Party	1964–1967	46th Congress
1967	Juvencio Molina Valera	Institutional Revolutionary Party	1967–1970	47th Congress
1970	Rodolfo Alavez Flores	Institutional Revolutionary Party	1970–1973	48th Congress
1973	Jorge Reyna Toledo	Institutional Revolutionary Party	1973–1976	49th Congress
1976	Gustavo Santaella Cortés	Institutional Revolutionary Party	1976–1979	50th Congress
1979	Leandro Martínez Machuca	Institutional Revolutionary Party	1979–1982	51st Congress
1982	Demetrio Meixueiro Sigüenza	Institutional Revolutionary Party	1982–1985	52nd Congress
1985	Mauro Rodríguez Cruz	Institutional Revolutionary Party	1985–1988	53rd Congress
1988	Artemio Meixueiro Sigüenza	Institutional Revolutionary Party	1988–1991	54th Congress
1991	Cándido Coheto Martínez	Institutional Revolutionary Party	1991–1994	55th Congress
1994	Blas Fortino Figueroa Montes	Institutional Revolutionary Party	1994–1997	56th Congress
1997	Emilia García Guzmán	Institutional Revolutionary Party	1997–2000	57th Congress
2000	María Lilia Mendoza Cruz	Institutional Revolutionary Party	2000–2003	58th Congress
2003	Elpidio Concha Arellano	Institutional Revolutionary Party	2003–2006	59th Congress
2006	Patricia Villanueva Abraján (Note: Villanueva Abraján resigned her seat on 10 February 2009 and was replaced by her alternate, Virgen Carrera.); Víctor Manuel Virgen Carrera	Institutional Revolutionary Party	2006–2009	60th Congress
2009	Elpidio Concha Arellano	Institutional Revolutionary Party	2009–2012	61st Congress
2012	Juan Luis Martínez Martínez (Note: Martínez Martínez switched allegiance from MC to Morena on 3 February 2015.)	Citizens' Movement (Mexico) National Regeneration Movement	2012–2015	62nd Congress
2015	Álvaro Rafael Rubio	Institutional Revolutionary Party	2015–2018	63rd Congress
2018	Irma Juan Carlos	National Regeneration Movement	2018–2021	64th Congress
2021	Irma Juan Carlos	National Regeneration Movement	2021–2024	65th Congress
2024	Irma Juan Carlos	National Regeneration Movement	2024–2027	66th Congress

== Presidential elections ==
Oaxaca's 2nd district
Election	District won by	Party or coalition	%
2018	Andrés Manuel López Obrador	Juntos Haremos Historia	58.7017
2024	Claudia Sheinbaum Pardo	Sigamos Haciendo Historia	70.1484
