= Gerardo Fernández Noroña =

Mexican politician

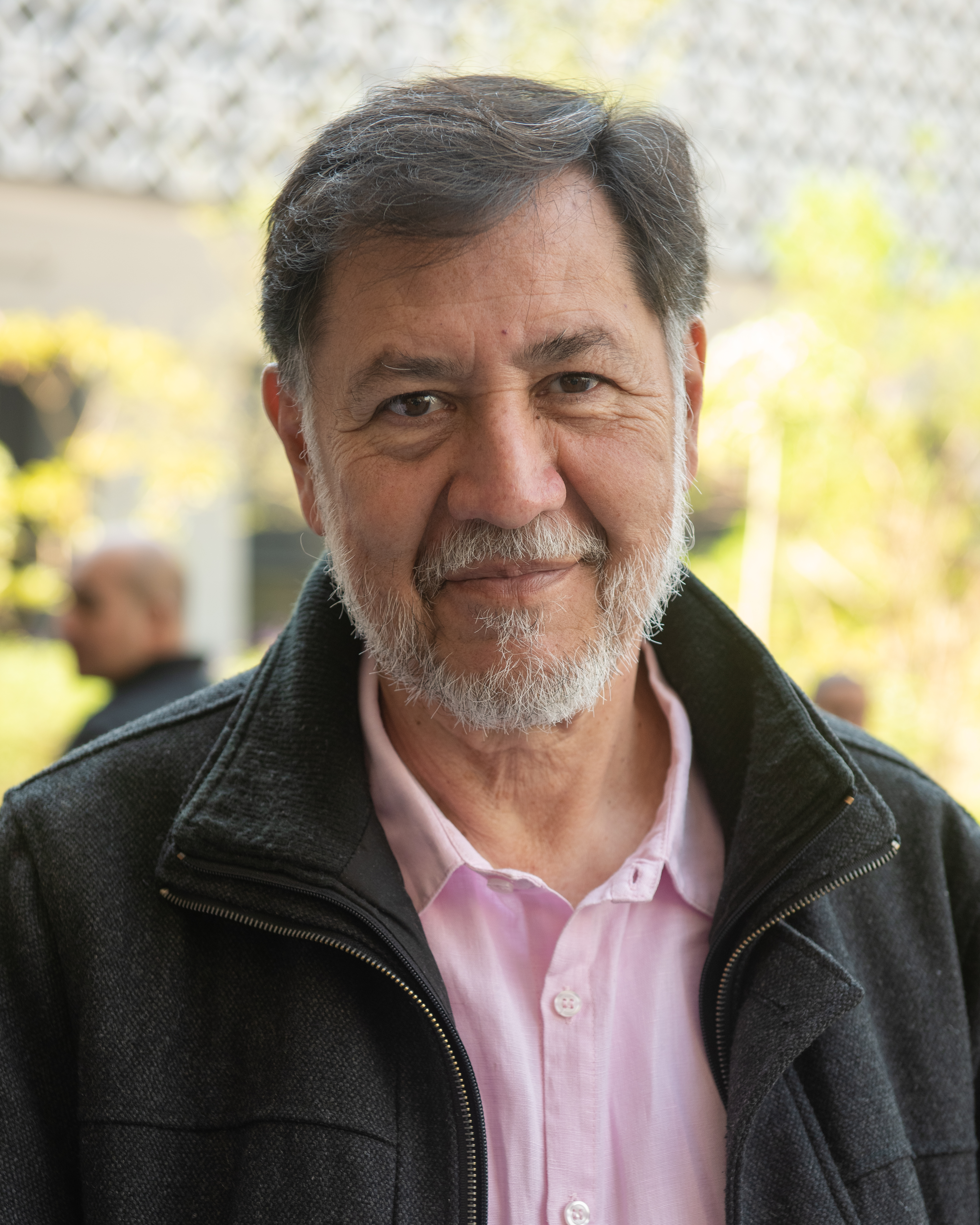
- Fernández Noroña in 2023

President of the Senate of the Republic
- In office 1 September 2024 – 31 August 2025
- Preceded by: Ana Lilia Rivera
- Succeeded by: Laura Itzel Castillo

Member of the Senate of the Republic
- Incumbent
- Assumed office 1 September 2024
- Constituency: Proportional representation

Member of the Chamber of Deputies
- In office 1 September 2018 – 31 August 2024
- Preceded by: Ernestina Godoy Ramos
- Succeeded by: Dolores Padierna Luna
- Constituency: Mexico City's 4th district
- In office 1 September 2009 – 31 August 2012
- Preceded by: Silvia Oliva Fragoso
- Succeeded by: Aleida Alavez Ruiz
- Constituency: Federal District's 19th district

Personal details
- Born: José Gerardo Rodolfo Fernández Noroña; 19 March 1960 (age 66) Mexico City, Mexico
- Party: Morena (2024–present)
- Other political affiliations: Independent (2008–2024) (Note: Although Fernández Noroña was part of the Labor Party parliamentary group during the 61st, 64th, and 65th Legislatures of the Mexican Congress, he was not formally a member of the party.); Party of the Democratic Revolution (1994–2008)
- Education: Universidad Autónoma Metropolitana (BA)
- Occupation: Sociologist, politician

José Gerardo Rodolfo Fernández Noroña (born 19 March 1960) is a Mexican politician and sociologist, previously served as the president of the Senate from 2024 until 31 August 2025, a member of the National Regeneration Movement (Morena), formerly from the Labor Party and the Party of the Democratic Revolution. He is known for his protest acts, especially starting with the 2006 presidential election. He served as a federal deputy on two occasions (2009–2012 and 2018–2023), and in 2023, he was nominated by the Labor Party to run as a candidate for the presidency within the "Together We Make History" coalition for the general election.

== Biography ==
=== Political career ===
In 1983, he earned a degree in Sociology at the Metropolitan Autonomous University (UAM).

He was an external candidate for federal deputy for the Mexican Socialist Party in 1988, and he joined the National Democratic Front (DFN), before it became the Party of the Democratic Revolution (PRD). In 1995, he led the creation of the Citizen Assembly in Defense of Bank Debtors, an organization that defended those who, due to the economic crisis that year in Mexico, had seen their debts increase as a result of their bank loans. He led protests, including one in 1996 in Cancún, in front of President Ernesto Zedillo, for which he was briefly imprisoned. However, he was released shortly after when Andrés Manuel López Obrador, then the national president of the PRD, intervened. He continued to be involved in the grassroots organization for the party until 2004, when he was appointed communications secretary of the PRD's national executive committee, headed by Leonel Cota Montaño, and therefore became the party's spokesperson.

During the 2006 presidential campaigns and the post-electoral conflict that followed, he led protests against the electoral fraud denounced by his party and its candidate, López Obrador, as well as in places where outgoing and incoming presidents, Vicente Fox and Felipe Calderón, were present.

From 2009 to 2012, Fernández Noroña served as deputy in the 61st Congress, representing the Federal District's 19th district.

His conflicts with members of the presidential general staff during the Calderón administration stemmed from his numerous demonstrations at official events that he attended. In 2009, he was already a deputy when he was denied access to the third State of the Nation Address. He accused the Calderón government of causing these incidents and claimed to have received death threats. As a deputy once again, he was barred from viewing one of Enrique Peña Nieto's State of the Nation addresses, which was held at the National Palace, and he also encountered Federal Police personnel due to his protests.

==== 2012 to present ====
In August 2012, Fernández Noroña began a tour to promote a movement against the victory of presidential candidate Enrique Peña Nieto. He also proposed the creation of a new left-wing political party, the Movimiento de Izquierda Libertaria.

On 15 September 2012, an assembly was held in Mexico City's Zócalo, where Balfre Vargas Cortez, Rosendo Marín Díaz, and Gerardo Fernández Noroña announced what they called an "appeal to the people of Mexico", a document in which they drafted the action plan against an alleged imposition by Peña Nieto through peaceful civil disobedience.

On 1 April 2015, Gerardo Fernández Noroña, leader of the National Assembly for the Independence of Mexico (ÁNIMO), was an external candidate for proportional representation federal deputy for the Labor Party (PT). Fernández Noroña carried out a national campaign, calling for votes and supporting PT candidates. He focused his campaign on touring the fourth electoral region with particular emphasis, for which he was a candidate, and which includes the Federal District, Puebla, Guerrero, Morelos, and Tlaxcala.

Regarding the alliance the Labor Party made in some states with the PRI and the PAN, Fernández Noroña emphasized that these alliances are local, that he disagrees with them, and that he would only run as a PT candidate. He also stated that despite significant pressure, the PT has remained firm by refusing to sign the Pact for Mexico and by voting against all structural reforms.

In 2016, he denounced the assault and theft of cell phones by the undersecretary of government of Puebla, Luis Arturo Cornejo, during the administration of Rafael Moreno Valle Rosas, when he was trying to mediate the release of political prisoners.

He was elected again to the Chamber of Deputies in 2018, representing Mexico City's 4th district for the Labor Party, and was re-elected to the same seat in 2021.

In September 2023, Noroña was appointed by Claudia Sheinbaum to oversee coordination tasks and strengthen the link with social organizations and civilians, and serve as a key spokesperson for the Juntos Hacemos Historia coalition in the 2024 general election.

He was elected to the Senate as a Morena proportional representation senator in the 2024 election. At the start of the August 2024 legislative session, he was elected president of the Senate.

== Controversies ==
- On 21 May 2021, Noroña visited Twitter's offices in Mexico City to protest the blocking of his account due to alleged violations of its terms of service. He was widely criticized after a video surfaced of the incident, where he was shown to abuse the Twitter member of staff who received him. Noroña said in a belligerent tone: "I'm here to complain. If you don't like it because you think it's going to be docked from your wages, then do not act as if you were the owner."
- In July 2021, he tested positive for COVID-19. He had been criticized for spreading COVID-19 misinformation, including stating that face masks are not effective in preventing the spread of the virus. In January 2022, he tested positive for the second time.
- On 15 April 2024, in response to the raid on the Mexican embassy in Quito, Noroña lodged a formal complaint against President Daniel Noboa of Ecuador with the Attorney General of Mexico, seeking his extradition for violating diplomatic premises. The Attorney General's office received the complaint but did not comment.
- In June 2025, in response to the Los Angeles protests, Noroña suggested that the whole Southwestern United States should be returned to Mexico, saying, "names don't lie. The most spoken language in Los Angeles is Spanish. You don't need to speak English to be in Los Angeles." He went on to denounce the existence of the United States and claimed that Mexicans had settled in the region long before the U.S. had achieved its independence.
- On 27 August 2025, Fernández Noroña figured in a brawl with Institutional Revolutionary Party leader Alito Moreno inside the Senate after Moreno accused him of not allowing him to speak following that day's session.
- In September 2025, during a forum at the Senate of the Republic, Fernández Noroña sparked controversy with his remarks on sexual violence. While acknowledging the seriousness of violence against women, he stated that cases of men being sexually assaulted by women are "practically exceptional".
