= L Legislature of the Mexican Congress =

Sitting of the Congress of the Union, 1976–1979

The L Legislature of the Congress of the Union met from 1976 to 1979. This 50th session of Congress consisted of senators and deputies who were members of their respective chambers. They began their duties on September 1, 1976, and ended on August 31, 1979.

The senators and deputies were elected to office in the 1976 Mexican general election. The senators were elected for a period of six years (so they maintained their seat in the next legislature), and the deputies were elected for a period of three years.

== Members ==
The composition of the 50th Congress was as follows:

=== Senate of the Republic ===
Two members were elected to the Senate from each state and the Federal District, giving a total of 64 senators. For the first time in history a senator was elected who did not belong to the Institutional Revolutionary Party (PRI). Jorge Cruickshank García had been nominated by the PPS; the PRI did not lose this seat, however, because it formed an electoral alliance with the winning party. Thus this senator posed no opposition to the PRI or the government during his term.

==== Number of Senators by political party ====
Party	Senators
Institutional Revolutionary Party	63
Popular Socialist Party	1

The 64 Senators forming the L Legislature were the following:

==== Senators by state ====
State	Senator	Party	State	Senator	Party
Aguascalientes	Rodolfo Landeros Gallegos		Nayarit	Leobardo Ramos Martínez	
Aguascalientes	Héctor Hugo Olivares Ventura		Nayarit	Daniel Espinoza Galindo	
Baja California	Rafael García Vázquez; Replaced Roberto de la Madrid Romandía		Nuevo León	Napoleón Gómez Sada	
Baja California	Oscar Baylón Chacón		Nuevo León	Adrián Yáñez Martínez	
Baja California Sur	Alberto Alvarado Arámburo		Oaxaca	Rodolfo Alaves Flores	
Baja California Sur	Víctor Manuel Liceaga Ruibal; Replaced Marcelo Rubio Ruiz (Note: Rubio Ruiz died on 6 January 1977.)		Oaxaca	Jorge Cruickshank García	
Campeche	Rosa María Martínez Denegri; Replaced Carlos Sansores Pérez		Puebla	Horacio Labastida Muñoz	
Campeche	Joaquín Repetto Ocampo; Replaced Fernando Rafful Miguel		Puebla	Blas Chumacero	
Chiapas	Roberto Corzo Gay		Querétaro	Rafael Camacho Guzmán	
Chiapas	Horacio Castellanos Coutiño		Querétaro	Telésforo Trejo Uribe	
Chihuahua	Óscar Ornelas		Quintana Roo	Vicente Coral Martínez	
Chihuahua	Mario Carballo Pazos		Quintana Roo	José Blanco Peyrefitte	
Coahuila	Eliseo Mendoza Berrueto		San Luis Potosí	Rafael Tristán López	
Coahuila	Gustavo Guerra Castaños		San Luis Potosí	Francisco Padrón Puyou	
Colima	Griselda Álvarez		Sinaloa	Hilda Anderson Nevárez	
Colima	Antonio Salazar y Salazar		Sinaloa	Gilberto Ruiz Almada	
Durango	Ignacio Castillo Mena		Sonora	Juan José Gastelum García	
Durango	Tomás Rangel Perales		Sonora	Adolfo de la Huerta Oriol	
Guanajuato	Euquerio Guerrero López		Tabasco	Antonio Ocampo Ramírez; Replaced Carlos Pellicer	
Guanajuato	Jesús Cabrera Muñoz Ledo		Tabasco	Nicolás Reynés Berazaluce; Replaced David Gustavo Gutiérrez	
Guerrero	Jorge Soberón Acevedo		Tamaulipas	Morelos Jaime Canseco González	
Guerrero	Alejandro Cervantes Delgado		Tamaulipas	Martha Chávez Padrón	
Hidalgo	Humberto Lugo Gil		Tlaxcala	Jesús Hernández Rojas	
Hidalgo	Vacant; By leave of Guillermo Rossell de la Lama and Jorge Rojo Lugo		Tlaxcala	Rafael Minor Franco	
Jalisco	José María Martínez Rodríguez		Veracruz	Silverio Ricardo Alvarado	
Jalisco	Arnulfo Villaseñor Saavedra		Veracruz	Sergio Martínez Mendoza	
State of Mexico	Leonardo Rodríguez Alcaine		Yucatán	Víctor Cervera Pacheco	
State of Mexico	Gustavo Baz		Yucatán	Graciliano Alpuche Pinzón	
Michoacán	José Luis Escobar Herrera; Replaced Cuauhtémoc Cárdenas Solórzano		Zacatecas	Jorge Gabriel García Rojas	
Michoacán	Guillermo Morfín García		Zacatecas	José Guadalupe Cervantes Corona	
Morelos	Angel Ventura Valle		Federal District of Mexico	Luis del Toro Calero; Replaced Hugo Cervantes del Río	
Morelos	Javier Rondero Zubieta		Federal District of Mexico	Joaquín Gamboa Pascoe	

=== Chamber of Deputies ===
For this legislative session, the Chamber of Deputies was composed of a total of 237 deputies, of whom 196 were elected by majority vote in each constituency and 41 more were party deputies (Spanish: diputados de partido), allocated in proportion to the votes that the non-winning parties obtained in the districts.

The composition of the Chamber of Deputies during the 50th session of Congress was as follows:

==== Number of deputies by political party ====
Party	Deputies
Institutional Revolutionary Party	196
National Action Party	20
Popular Socialist Party	12
Partido Auténtico de la Revolución Mexicana	9

==== Deputies from single-member districts (plurality) ====
State	District	Deputy	Party	State	District	Deputy	Party
Aguascalientes	01	Jesús Martínez Gortari		México	08	Armando Labra Manjarrez	
Aguascalientes	02	Camilo López Gómez		México	09	Juan Ortíz Montoya	
Baja California	01	Ricardo Eguía Valderrama		México	10	José Luis García García	
Baja California	02	Alfonso Ballesteros Pelayo		México	11	Guillermo Choussal Valladares	
Baja California	03	Alfonso Garzón Santibáñez		México	12	Cecilio Salas Gálvez	
Baja California Sur	01	Víctor Manuel Peralta Osuna		México	13	Pedro Ávila Hernández	
Baja California Sur	02	Agapito Duarte Hernández		México	14	Armando Hurtado Navarro	
Campeche	01	Abelardo Carrillo Zavala		México	15	Héctor Ximénez González	
Campeche	02	Jorge Muñoz Icthé		Michoacán	01	Nicanor Gómez Reyes	
Chiapas	01	Jaime Sabines		Michoacán	02	Antonio Jaimes Aguilar	
Chiapas	02	Fernando Correa Suárez		Michoacán	03	Raúl Lemus García	
Chiapas	03	Homero Tovilla Cristiani		Michoacán	04	Roberto Garibay Ochoa	
Chiapas	04	Manuel Villafuerte Mijangos		Michoacán	05	Jaime Bravo Ramírez	
Chiapas	05	Gonzalo Esponda Zebadúa		Michoacán	06	Eduardo Estrada Pérez	
Chiapas	06	Leonardo León Cerpa		Michoacán	07	Juan Rodríguez González	
Chihuahua	01	Alberto Ramírez Gutiérrez		Michoacán	08	Héctor Terán Torres	
Chihuahua	02	Oswaldo Rodríguez González		Michoacán	09	Roberto Ruiz del Río	
Chihuahua	03	José Reyes Estrada Aguirre		Morelos	01	Antonio Riva Palacio López	
Chihuahua	04	Juan Ernesto Madera Prieto		Morelos	02	Filomeno López Rea	
Chihuahua	05	Artemio Iglesias		Nayarit	01	Ignacio Langarica Quintana	
Chihuahua	06	José Refugio Mar de la Rosa		Nayarit	02	María Hilaria Domínguez Arvizu	
Coahuila	01	José de las Fuentes Rodríguez		Nuevo León	01	Carlota Vargas Garza	
Coahuila	02	Carlos Ortiz Tejeda		Nuevo León	02	Heriberto Santos Lozano	
Coahuila	03	Fernando Cabrera Rodríguez		Nuevo León	03	Raúl Caballero Escamilla	
Coahuila	04	Julián Muñoz Uresti		Nuevo León	04	Eleazar Ruiz Cerda	
Colima	01	Ramón Serrano García		Nuevo León	05	Arturo Luna Lugo	
Colima	02	Fernando Moreno Peña		Nuevo León	06	Jesús Puente Leyva	
Federal District	01	Eduardo Andrade Sánchez		Nuevo León	07	Roberto Olivares Vera	
Federal District	02	José Salvador Lima Zuno		Oaxaca	01	Lucía Betanzos de Bay	
Federal District	03	Carlos Riva Palacio Velazco		Oaxaca	02	Gustavo Santaella Cortés	
Federal District	04	Enrique Ramírez y Ramírez		Oaxaca	03	Ericel Gómez Nucamendi	
Federal District	05	Miguel Molina Herrera		Oaxaca	04	Ernesto Aguilar Flores	
Federal District	06	Alfonso Rodríguez Rivera		Oaxaca	05	Luis Candelario Jiménez Sosa	
Federal District	07	María Elena Márques de Torruco		Oaxaca	06	Heladio Ramírez López	
Federal District	08	Julio César Mena Brito		Oaxaca	07	Zoraida Bernal de Badillo	
Federal District	09	Venustiano Reyes López		Oaxaca	08	Julio Esponda Solana	
Federal District	10	Gloria Carrillo Salinas		Oaxaca	09	Raúl Bolaños Cacho Guzmán	
Federal District	11	Jaime Aguilar Álvarez		Puebla	01	Nicolás Pérez Pavón	
Federal District	12	Miguel López Riveroll		Puebla	02	Jorge Domínguez Ramírez	
Federal District	13	Rodolfo González Guevara		Puebla	03	Antonio Montes García	
Federal District	14	Jorge Mendicutti Negrete		Puebla	04	Antonio Hernández Jiménez	
Federal District	15	Juan José Osorio Palacios		Puebla	05	Sacramento Jofre Vázquez	
Federal District	16	Alfonso Argudín Laria		Puebla	06	Antonio Tenorio Adame	
Federal District	17	Héctor Hernández Casanova		Puebla	07	Guadalupe López Bretón	
Federal District	18	Hugo Díaz Velázquez		Puebla	08	Jesús Sarabia y Ordóñez	
Federal District	19	Abraham Martínez Rivero		Puebla	09	Jorge Murad Macluf; Replaced Manuel Rivera Anaya	
Federal District	20	Jesús González Balandrano		Puebla	10	Adolfo Rodríguez Juárez	
Federal District	21	Martha Andrade de Del Rosal		Querétaro	01	Eduardo Ugalde Vargas	
Federal District	22	Ifigenia Martínez		Querétaro	02	Vicente Montes Velázquez	
Federal District	23	Enrique Soto Izquierdo		Quintana Roo	01	Carlos Gómez Barrera	
Federal District	24	Enrique Álvarez del Castillo		Quintana Roo	02	Emilio Oxte Tah	
Federal District	25	Celia Torres de Sánchez		San Luis Potosí	01	Roberto Leyva Torres	
Federal District	26	Humberto Serrano Pérez		San Luis Potosí	02	Guadalupe Vega Macías	
Federal District	27	Hugo Roberto Castro Aranda		San Luis Potosí	03	Víctor Maldonado Moreleón	
Durango	01	Ángel Sergio Guerrero Mier		San Luis Potosí	04	Héctor González Lárraga	
Durango	02	Maximiliano Silerio Esparza		San Luis Potosí	05	Eusebio López Sáinz	
Durango	03	Salvador Reyes Nevárez		Sinaloa	01	Tolentino Rodríguez Félix	
Durango	04	José Ramírez Gamero		Sinaloa	02	Felipe Armenta Gallardo	
Guanajuato	01	Esteban Mario Garaiz		Sinaloa	03	Rafael Oceguera Ramos	
Guanajuato	02	Enrique Gómez Guerra		Sinaloa	04	Antonio Toledo Corro	
Guanajuato	03	Juan Varela Mayorga		Sinaloa	05	Patricio Robles Robles	
Guanajuato	04	Miguel Montes García		Sonora	01	Ricardo Castillo Peralta	
Guanajuato	05	Aurelio García Sierra		Sonora	02	César Augusto Tapia Quijada	
Guanajuato	06	Alfredo Carrillo Juárez		Sonora	03	José Luis Vargas González	
Guanajuato	07	Enrique León Hernández		Sonora	04	Bernabé Arana León	
Guanajuato	08	Graciela Meave Torrescano		Tabasco	01	Luis Priego Ortiz	
Guanajuato	09	Donaciano Luna Hernández		Tabasco	02	Roberto Madrazo Pintado	
Guerrero	01	Isaías Gómez Salgado		Tabasco	03	Francisco Rabelo Cupido	
Guerrero	02	Isaías Duarte Martínez		Tamaulipas	01	Abdón Rodríguez Sánchez	
Guerrero	03	Miguel Bello Pineda		Tamaulipas	02	Oscar Mario Santos Gómez	
Guerrero	04	Hortensia Santoyo de Martínez		Tamaulipas	03	Agapito González Cavazos	
Guerrero	05	Reveriano García Castrejón		Tamaulipas	04	Aurora Cruz de Mora	
Guerrero	06	Salustio Salgado Guzmán		Tamaulipas	05	Fernando San Pedro Salem	
Hidalgo	01	Ladislao Castillo Feregrino		Tamaulipas	06	Julio Martínez Rodríguez	
Hidalgo	02	Luis José Dorantes Segovia		Tlaxcala	01	Nazario Romero Díaz	
Hidalgo	03	Efraín Mera Arias		Tlaxcala	02	Antonio Vega García	
Hidalgo	04	José Antonio Zorrilla Pérez		Veracruz	01	Guilebaldo Flores Fuentes	
Hidalgo	05	Vicente Trejo Callejas		Veracruz	02	Pericles Namorado Urrutia	
Jalisco	01	Guillermo Cosío Vidaurri		Veracruz	03	Emilio Salgado Zubiaga	
Jalisco	02	Reynaldo Dueñas Villaseñor		Veracruz	04	Manuel Gutiérrez Zamora Zamudio	
Jalisco	03	Félix Flores Gómez		Veracruz	05	Seth Cardeña Luna	
Jalisco	04	Porfirio Cortés Silva		Veracruz	06	Carlos Manuel Vargas Sánchez	
Jalisco	05	José Mendoza Padilla		Veracruz	07	Daniel Nogueira Huerta	
Jalisco	06	Rigoberto González Quezada		Veracruz	08	Celeste Castillo Moreno	
Jalisco	07	Ma. Refugio Castillón Coronado		Veracruz	09	Mario Martínez Dector	
Jalisco	08	Ricardo Chávez Pérez		Veracruz	10	Pastor Munguía González	
Jalisco	09	María Guadalupe Urzúa Flores		Veracruz	11	Miguel Portela Cruz	
Jalisco	10	Francisco Javier Santillán Oceguera		Veracruz	12	Mario Hernández Posadas	
Jalisco	11	Héctor Castañeda Jiménez		Veracruz	13	Francisco Cinta Guzmán	
Jalisco	12	Rafael González Pimienta		Veracruz	14	Juan Meléndez Pacheco	
Jalisco	13	Jesús Alberto Mora López		Veracruz	15	Eduardo Thomae Domínguez	
México	01	Gildardo Herrera		Yucatán	01	Mirna Hoyos Schlamme	
México	02	Josefina Esquivel de Quintana		Yucatán	02	Rubén Calderón Cecilio	
México	03	José Delgado Valle		Yucatán	03	Víctor Manzanilla Schaffer	
México	04	Arturo Martínez Legorreta		Zacatecas	01	Gustavo Salinas Íñiguez	
México	05	José Martínez Martínez		Zacatecas	02	Crescencio Herrera Herrera	
México	06	Rosendo Franco Escamilla		Zacatecas	03	José Leal Longoria	
México	07	Julio Zamora Bátiz		Zacatecas	04	Julián Macías Pérez	

==== Party deputies ====
Deputy	Party	Deputy	Party	Deputy	Party
Fausto Alarcón Escalona		José Ortega Mendoza		Eugenio Soto Sánchez	
Gonzalo Altamirano Dimas		Francisco Pedraza Villarreal		Rafael Campos López	
María Elena Álvarez Bernal		Francisco José Peniche Bolio		Víctor Manuel Carrasco	
Miguel Campos Martínez		Adrián Peña Soto		Felipe Cerecedo López	
Guillermo Carlos de Carcer		Jacinto Silva Flores		Alberto Contreras Valencia	
Jorge Garabito Martínez		Juan Torres Ciprés		Francisco Hernández Juárez	
Ramón Garcilita Partida		Saúl Castorena Monterrubio		Marcela Lombardo Otero	
Miguel Hernández Labastida		Fortino Garza Cárdenas		Jesús Luján Gutiérrez	
Guillermo Islas Olguín		Pedro González Azcuaga		Francisco Ortiz Mendoza	
Sergio Lujambio Rafols		Raúl Guillén Pérez Vargas		Román Ramírez Contreras	
Rosalba Magallón Camacho		Manuel Hernández Alvarado		Héctor Ramírez Cuéllar	
José Luis Martínez Galicia		Edilio Hinojosa López		Idelfonso Reyes Soto	
Tomás Nava de la Rosa		Apolinar Ramírez Meneses		Ezequiel Rodríguez Otal	
Teodoro Ortega García		Arcelia Sánchez			

==== Presidents of the high commission of the Chamber of Deputies ====
- 1976–1977: Augusto Gómez Villanueva
- 1977–1979: Rodolfo González Guevara
- 1979: Antonio Riva Palacio López

== Main accomplishments ==
It was the 50th Congress that, in 1977, adopted the first political reforms to occur in Mexico. This reform, negotiated by Secretary of the Interior Jesús Reyes Heroles, included legal recognition of political organizations from the left, traditionally marginalized and pushed into armed struggle, especially after the events of 1968 and which degenerated into a "Dirty War" during the 1970s.

Legal reform, known formally as the Ley de Organizaciones Políticas y Procedimientos Electorales (LOPPE) (Law of Political Organizations and Electoral Procedures), defined and made possible procedures for the registration of new political parties (in 1977 legally there were only the PRI, the National Action Party (PAN), the Popular Socialist Party (PPS) and the Authentic Party of the Mexican Revolution (PARM)). This allowed for the registration, for the first time in 40 years, of the Mexican Communist Party, which was followed by the National Assembly of the Socialist Left, the Mexican Democratic Party and the Social Democratic Party.

In addition, the LOPPE increased the size of the Chamber of Deputies, increasing the number of single-member districts from 196 to 300 and establishing deputies by proportional representation, replacing the previous deputies by party. There were initially 100 such positions, resulting in the Chamber of Deputies comprising 400 deputies.

== See also ==
- Congress of the Union
- Mexico Chamber of Deputies
- Senate of the Republic (Mexico)
