= Samuel Gurrión Matías =

Mexican politician and lawyer

- Born: 3 January 1968 (age 58); Juchitán de Zaragoza, Oaxaca, Mexico
- Other name: Sami
- Occupations: Deputy and lawyer
- Political party: PAN
- Family: Elizabeth Gurrión Matías, Daniel Gurrión Matías, Omar Gurrión Matías, Normando Gurrión Matías, Nery Ruth Gurrión Matías, Elizabeth Valdivieso Gurrion (Valgur), Carlos Orozco Elwin

Samuel Gurrión Matías (born 3 January 1968) is a Mexican politician and lawyer affiliated with the Institutional Revolutionary Party (PRI). In the 2012 general election he was elected to the Chamber of Deputies to represent the seventh district of Oaxaca during the 62nd Congress.
