= Juan Luis Martínez Martínez =

Mexican politician

- Born: 26 June 1972 (age 53); Oaxaca, Mexico
- Occupation: Deputy
- Political party: MC (1990s–2015); MORENA (2015–present)

Juan Luis Martínez Martínez (born 26 June 1972) is a Mexican politician affiliated with the National Regeneration Movement (Morena) who formerly belonged to the Citizens' Movement (MC).

In the 2012 general election he was elected to the Chamber of Deputies to represent the second district of Oaxaca during the 62nd Congress representing Oaxaca. He defected from the Citizens' Movement to Morena on 3 February 2015 while in office.
