= Irma Juan Carlos =

Mexican politician (born 1977)

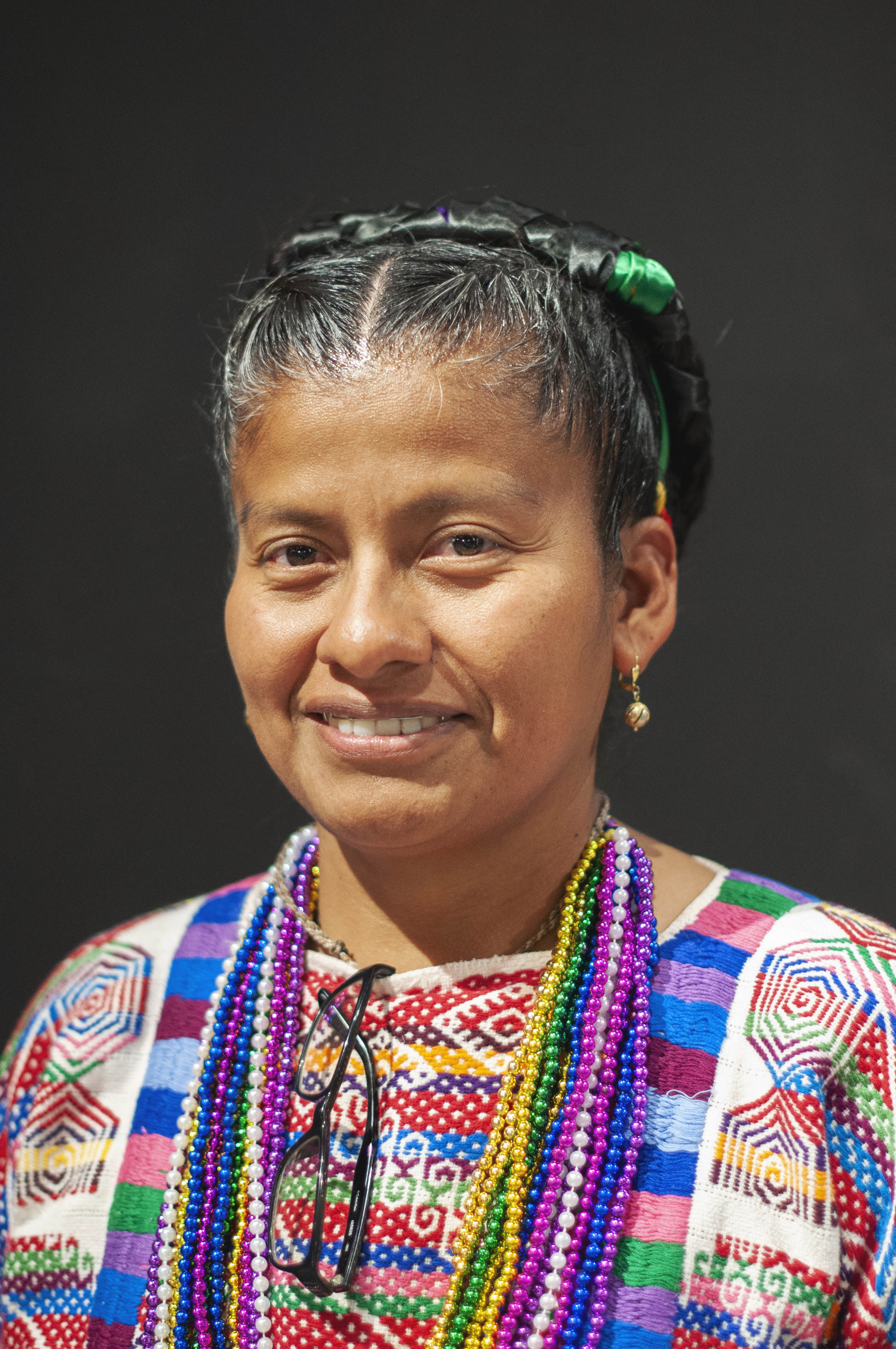

Federal deputy for Oaxaca's 2nd district
- Incumbent
- Assumed office 1 September 2018

Personal details
- Born: 19 July 1977 (age 49) Santiago Jocotepec, Oaxaca, Mexico
- Party: PRD, Morena
- Education: Instituto Tecnológico de la Cuenca del Papaloapan

Irma Juan Carlos (Note: In this Spanish name, the first or paternal surname is Juan and the second or maternal family name is Carlos.) (born 19 July 1977) is a Mexican politician. Previously affiliated with the Party of the Democratic Revolution (PRD), she has represented Oaxaca's 2nd district in the Chamber of Deputies for the National Regeneration Movement (Morena) since 2018.

== Career ==
Irma Juan Carlos was born on 19 July 1977 in Santiago Jocotepec, in the Papaloapan region of the state of Oaxaca. A member of the Chinantec Indigenous people, she holds a degree in biology from the Instituto Tecnológico de la Cuenca del Papaloapan in Tuxtepec (2002) and a master's in tropical forest management and conservation from the Centro Agronómico Tropical de Investigación y Enseñanza in Costa Rica (2005).

Her political activism began in 2000 when she worked for the 2000 presidential campaign of Cuauhtémoc Cárdenas (PRD). She was later a national delegate of the PRD in Oaxaca and a member of the party's state council. By 2012 she had switched allegiance to Morena; in 2013–2018 she was one of the party's state council members, including a period as the council's president in 2016–2018.

In the 2018 general election she was elected to the Chamber of Deputies for Oaxaca's 2nd district for the first time, and she was re-elected to subsequent terms in the 2021 mid-terms and the 2024 general election. During her 2018–2021 and 2021–2024 periods in Congress, she chaired the lower house's Committee on Indigenous and Afro-Mexican Peoples. She also represented the lower house on the board of the National Institute of Indigenous Peoples (INPI) in 2020.

In 2021, Juan Carlos contended for Morena's nomination to compete in the 2022 gubernatorial election in Oaxaca. She made it to the final stages of the process but ultimately lost to Salomón Jara Cruz, who went on to win the 5 June 2022 election.

In April 2025, she was among a group of Morena deputies who demanded the dismissal of Secretary of Welfare Ariadna Montiel Reyes on account of her "despotic attitude" and alleged acts of corruption within her department.
