= Gloria Bautista Cuevas =

Mexican politician

- Born: 16 March 1953 (age 73); Huajuapan de León, Oaxaca, Mexico
- Occupation: Deputy
- Political party: PRD

Gloria Bautista Cuevas (born 16 March 1953) is a Mexican politician affiliated with the Party of the Democratic Revolution (PRD). In the 2012 general election she was elected to the Chamber of Deputies to represent the third district of Oaxaca during the 62nd Congress.
