= Alavez =

Alavez is a surname. Notable people with the surname include:

- Aleida Alavez Ruiz (born 1974), Mexican politician
- Francita Alavez (c. 1816–c. 1906), Texan heroine
- Gilberto Alavez, Mexican Paralympic athlete
