= Miguel Sánchez Carreño =

Mexican politician (born 1948)

- Born: 28 September 1948 (age 77); Oaxaca, Oaxaca, Mexico
- Occupation: Politician
- Political party: PRI

Miguel Sadot Sánchez Carreño (born 29 September 1948) is a Mexican politician affiliated with the Institutional Revolutionary Party (PRI).

In the 1997 mid-terms he was elected to the Chamber of Deputies to represent the fourth district of Oaxaca during the 57th Congress, and in the 2000 general election he was elected to the Senate to represent Oaxaca during the 58th and 59th Congresses.
