= Pedro Cabrera Rivero =

Mexican politician (born 1962)

- Born: 22 December 1962 (age 63); Oaxaca, Mexico
- Occupation: Politician
- Political party: PRI

Pedro Gustavo Cabrera Rivero (born 22 December 1962) is a Mexican politician affiliated with the Institutional Revolutionary Party (PRI). In 2006 he served in the Chamber of Deputies representing Oaxaca's 11th district as the substitute of Gonzalo Ruiz Cerón.
