= Daniel Gurrión Matías =

Mexican politician

- Born: 30 January 1958 (age 68); Oaxaca, Mexico
- Occupation: Politician
- Political party: PRI

Daniel Gurrión Matías (born 30 January 1958) is a Mexican politician from the Institutional Revolutionary Party (PRI). In 2009 he served in the Chamber of Deputies representing the seventh district of Oaxaca as the substitute of Jorge Toledo Luis.
