= Sara Guadalupe Figueroa Canedo =

Mexican politician

- Born: 17 February 1956 (age 70); Mexico City, Mexico
- Education: Universidad Iberoamericana
- Occupation: Politician
- Political party: PVEM

Sara Guadalupe Figueroa Canedo (born 17 February 1956) is a Mexican politician from the Ecologist Green Party of Mexico (PVEM). From 2000 to 2003 she served as a federal deputy in the 58th Congress, representing the Federal District's seventeenth district for the PVEM.
