= Elpidio Concha =

Mexican politician

- Born: Elpidio Desiderio Concha Arellano; 29 March 1963 (age 63); San Juan Bautista, Cuicatlan, Oaxaca Mexico
- Other name: RATA
- Education: B.A. in political science, UAM
- Occupation: Politician
- Political party: PRI

Elpidio Desiderio Concha Arellano (born 29 March 1963) is a Mexican politician affiliated with the Institutional Revolutionary Party (PRI).

He has been elected to the Chamber of Deputies on two occasions, both times representing the second district of Oaxaca for the PRI: in the 2003 mid-terms, to serve during the 59th Congress, and in the 2009 mid-terms, to serve during the 61st Congress.
