= María Garfias Maldonado =

Mexican politician

- Born: 24 August 1968 (age 57); Iztapalapa, Federal District, Mexico
- Occupation: Politician
- Political party: PRD

María Elba Garfias Maldonado (born 24 August 1968) is a Mexican politician affiliated with the Party of the Democratic Revolution (PRD). In the 2003 mid-terms she was elected to the Chamber of Deputies to represent the Federal District's 19th district during the 59th Congress.
