= Fernando Zárate Salgado =

Mexican politician (born 1979)

- Born: 16 August 1979 (age 46); Álvaro Obregón, D.F., Mexico
- Education: Instituto Tecnológico Autónomo de México-ITAM (law); Columbia University in the City of New York (law, masters degree); Universidad Nacional Autónoma de México (UNAM) Phd
- Occupation: Deputy
- Website: www.fernandozarate.com

Fernando Zárate Salgado (born August 16, 1979) is a Mexican Congressman, elected in the 23rd district in Mexico City for the 2024-2027 period representing Morena political party. In 2015-2018, he served as Congressman in Mexico City for the 25th district, and in 2012–2015, he served as a federal deputy in the 62nd Congress, representing the Federal District's seventeenth district for the Party of the Democratic Revolution (PRD).

He served as Secretary of the International and Foreign Affairs Committee and a member of the Constitutional Reforms and Justice Committee.

As President of the Special Gaming Committee, he denounced corruption cases regarding licenses of casinos in Mexico by the cabinet of Felipe Claderon Hinojosa (President of Mexico 2006–2012). He filed a new legislative bill on gaming and casinos to reform the existing 1948 law, approved by the lower House.

He was the first legislator to file and secure approval for imposing taxes on soft drinks, sugar-sweetened beverages, and junk food. Mexico is the first country in the world to approve such a legislative measure, which has served as an example to the rest of Latin America and has started filing legislative bills to prevent obesity.

In March 2015, after denouncing corruption cases within the PRD, and foreseeing that the left-wing party was going to lose the intermediate election, he resigned from the political party. He was the target of a political and media attack in May 2015, while seeking a local representative position within PRI/PVEM (Partido Revolucionario Institucional) launched by his former political party, while defending the property and freedom of expression rights of an indigenous community.

Elected to the Legislative Assembly of the Federal District for the VII legislature 2015–2018, he was appointed Chairman of the Metropolitan Area Committee.

Due to the excessive exploitation, excessive and illegal use of urban areas by some of the top construction companies in Mexico, he deepened the criticism and made it public cases of corruption and illegal use of power, filing criminal and Human Rights cases against the Mayor of Mexico City, Miguel Ángel Mancera, members of his cabinet, and other elected governors (chiefs of four boroughs), creating a political moment where the opposition capitalized beating the government and the ruling party in the 2018 election.

He served as Chairman of Mexico City's Congress in 2018. During his presidency, Mexico City's reconstruction law was discussed and passed, addressing the six-month gap in economic support and reconstruction gap for victims of the 7.1 (Richter scale) 2017 earthquake.

In 2022-2023, he served as Undersecretary of Welfare in Mexico's city government. Among his responsibilities were homeless people, shelters, community kitchens, relationships with stakeholders and NGO's, social emergency programs and actions, and migration. Special strategies and actions to reduce inequalities were taken under his leadership, including the "winter campaign," which delivered more than 400,000 winter clothes and blankets to the vulnerable community in the city, distributed across more than 500 neighbourhoods, and other goods to protect and reduce vulnerabilities. Also, he supervised and implemented the city's first homeless census, with important institutions involved, including the Secretary of Security and Human Rights.

He won for the third time a decision mechanism -poll- to become the political leader and candidate in Álvaro Obregón's borough in 2024, but he was appointed to run in the 23rd district as Congressman, one of the largest districts and more contrasting in the whole city including the area of San Angel, Pedregal de San Angel, Las Aguilas, which was one of the stronghold districts for PAN in the country. Finishing second in the race but the most voted among Morena and the rest of the political parties, he was elected Congressman in the "first minority" system.
