= José Antonio Yglesias Arreola =

Mexican politician

- Born: 28 June 1957 (age 68); Oaxaca, Oaxaca, Mexico
- Occupation: Politician
- Political party: PRI

José Antonio Yglesias Arreola (born 28 June 1957) is a Mexican politician from the Institutional Revolutionary Party (PRI). He was born in the city of Oaxaca.

In the 2009 mid-terms he was elected to the Chamber of Deputies to represent the 11th district of Oaxaca during the 61st Congress.
