= Jorge Toledo Luis =

Mexican politician (born 1966)

- Born: 10 December 1966 (age 59); Juchitán de Zaragoza, Oaxaca, Mexico
- Occupation: Politician
- Political party: PRI

Jorge Toledo Luis (born 10 December 1966) is a Mexican politician affiliated with the Institutional Revolutionary Party (PRI).

In the 2006 general election he was elected to the Chamber of Deputies to represent the seventh district of Oaxaca during the 60th Congress; however, he resigned his seat on 11 January 2009 and was replaced by his substitute, Daniel Gurrión Matías. He also served in the Senate during the 63rd Congress, representing Oaxaca.
