= Delfina Guzmán Díaz =

Mexican politician

- Born: 13 November 1960 (age 65); Jamiltepec, Oaxaca, Mexico
- Occupation: Deputy
- Political party: MORENA

Delfina Elizabeth Guzmán Díaz (born 13 November 1960) is a Mexican politician affiliated with National Regeneration Movement (Morena) who previously belonged to the Party of the Democratic Revolution (PRD). She was born in the city of Jamiltepec, Oaxaca.

In the 2012 general election, running on the PRD ticket, she was elected to the Chamber of Deputies to represent the 11th district of Oaxaca during the 62nd session of Congress (2012–2015).

In 2018, she won election as a local deputy to the Congress of Oaxaca, one of 24 Morena candidates (out of 25 districts) to win election.
