= Edith Escobar Camacho =

Mexican politician

- Born: 17 September 1938 (age 87); Chiapas, Mexico
- Occupation: Politician
- Political party: PRI

Edith Escobar Camacho (born 17 September 1938) is a Mexican politician from the Institutional Revolutionary Party (PRI). From 2002 to 2003 she sat in the Chamber of Deputies representing the fifth district of Oaxaca as the substitute of Bulmaro Rito Salinas.
