= Marcelo Rubio Ruiz =

Mexican politician (1932–1977)

Senator from Baja California Sur
- In office 6 September 1976 – 6 January 1977 Serving with Alberto Alvarado Arámburo
- Preceded by: Jesús Castro Agúndez
- Succeeded by: Víctor Manuel Liceaga Ruibal

Personal details
- Born: 1932 Santa Rosalía, Baja California Sur, Mexico
- Died: 6 January 1977 (aged 44–45) La Paz, Baja California Sur, Mexico
- Party: PRI
- Spouse: Cecilia Beltrán
- Children: 4
- Education: Higher Normal School of Mexico
- Occupation: Politician and teacher

Marcelo Rubio Ruiz (1932 – 6 January 1977) was a Mexican politician and teacher affiliated with the Institutional Revolutionary Party (PRI). He served as a Senator for Baja California Sur in the L Legislature of the Mexican Congress from 1976 until his death in 1977.

== Biography ==
Rubio Ruiz was born in Santa Rosalía, Baja California Sur in 1932. He later moved to the state capital of La Paz, where he completed his secondary studies before earning his teaching certificate at the Urban Normal School in 1951. After that, he graduated from the Higher Normal School of Mexico with a licentiate degree in education. He taught at primary and secondary schools before serving an administrative role at the Urban Normal School in La Paz.

Rubio Ruiz joined the cabinet of governor Ángel César Mendoza Arámburo, serving as secretary-general of government. He was also president of the PRI regional committee of Baja California Sur. In 1976 he was elected to represent his home state as a Senator in the L Legislature of the Mexican Congress, where he served as president of the fishing committee. However, just a few months after taking office, he died during a surgical procedure on 6 January 1977 in La Paz. He was survived by his wife, Cecilia Beltrán, and four children. A minute of silence was observed at the next Congressional meeting on 12 January, and he was replaced by his substitute senator, Víctor Manuel Liceaga Ruibal.

A teacher's college bearing his name, the Centro Regional de Educación Normal Marcelo Rubio Ruiz, was established in 1976. Based in the city of Loreto, it is considered one of the most prestigious institutions of higher learning in the state. There is also a street in La Paz named Calle Profesor Marcelo Rubio Ruiz, as well as a district in the town of Guerrero Negro named after him.
