= Emilio Mendoza Kaplan =

Mexican politician

- Born: 28 December 1955 (age 70); Mexico City, Mexico
- Occupation: Politician
- Political party: PRI

Emilio Andrés Mendoza Kaplan (born 28 December 1955) is a Mexican politician from the Institutional Revolutionary Party (PRI). In the 2009 mid-terms he was elected to the Chamber of Deputies to represent the seventh district of Oaxaca during the 61st Congress.
