= Daisy Hernández Gaytán =

Mexican politician

- Born: 6 January 1983 (age 43); Santiago Suchilquitongo, Oaxaca, Mexico
- Occupation: Politician
- Political party: PRD

Daisy Hernández Gaytán (born 6 January 1983) is a Mexican politician affiliated with the Party of the Democratic Revolution (PRD).

In the 2006 general election she was elected to the Chamber of Deputies to represent the third district of Oaxaca during the 60th Congress.
