= Joaquín de los Santos Molina =

Mexican politician

- Born: 26 November 1963 (age 62); Oaxaca, Mexico
- Occupation: Politician
- Political party: PRD

Joaquín Conrado de los Santos Molina (born 26 November 1963) is a Mexican politician affiliated with the Party of the Democratic Revolution (PRD). In the 2006 general election he was elected to the Chamber of Deputies to represent the 11th district of Oaxaca during the 60th Congress.
