= Gonzalo Ruiz Cerón =

Mexican politician

- Born: 26 June 1962 (age 64); San Pedro Mixtepec, Juquila, Oaxaca, Mexico
- Education: UAAAN
- Occupation: Politician
- Political party: PRI

Gonzalo Ruiz Cerón (born 26 June 1962) is a Mexican politician affiliated with the Institutional Revolutionary Party (PRI). He was born in San Pedro Mixtepec, Oaxaca.

In the 2003 mid-terms he was elected to the Chamber of Deputies to represent the 11th district of Oaxaca during the 59th Congress; on 13 March 2006, however, he resigned his seat and was replaced by his substitute, Pedro Cabrera Rivero. He previously served as municipal president of San Pedro Mixtepec (1990–1992) and as a local deputy in the Congress of Oaxaca.
