= Víctor Manuel Virgen =

Mexican politician

- Born: 2 November 1961 (age 64); Oaxaca, Mexico
- Occupation: Politician
- Political party: PRI

Víctor Manuel Virgen Carrera (born 2 November 1961) is a Mexican politician from the Institutional Revolutionary Party (PRI). In 2009 he served as a deputy during the 60th session of Congress representing Oaxaca's second district.
