= Carlos Altamirano Toledo =

Mexican politician (born 1946)

- Born: 28 March 1946 (age 80); Oaxaca, Mexico
- Occupation: Politician
- Political party: PRD

Carlos Altamirano Toledo (born 28 March 1946) is a Mexican politician affiliated with the Party of the Democratic Revolution (PRD). In the 2006 general election he was elected to the Chamber of Deputies to represent the fifth district of Oaxaca during the 60th Congress.
