= Jorge Meixueiro =

Mexican lawyer and politician (1907–1943)

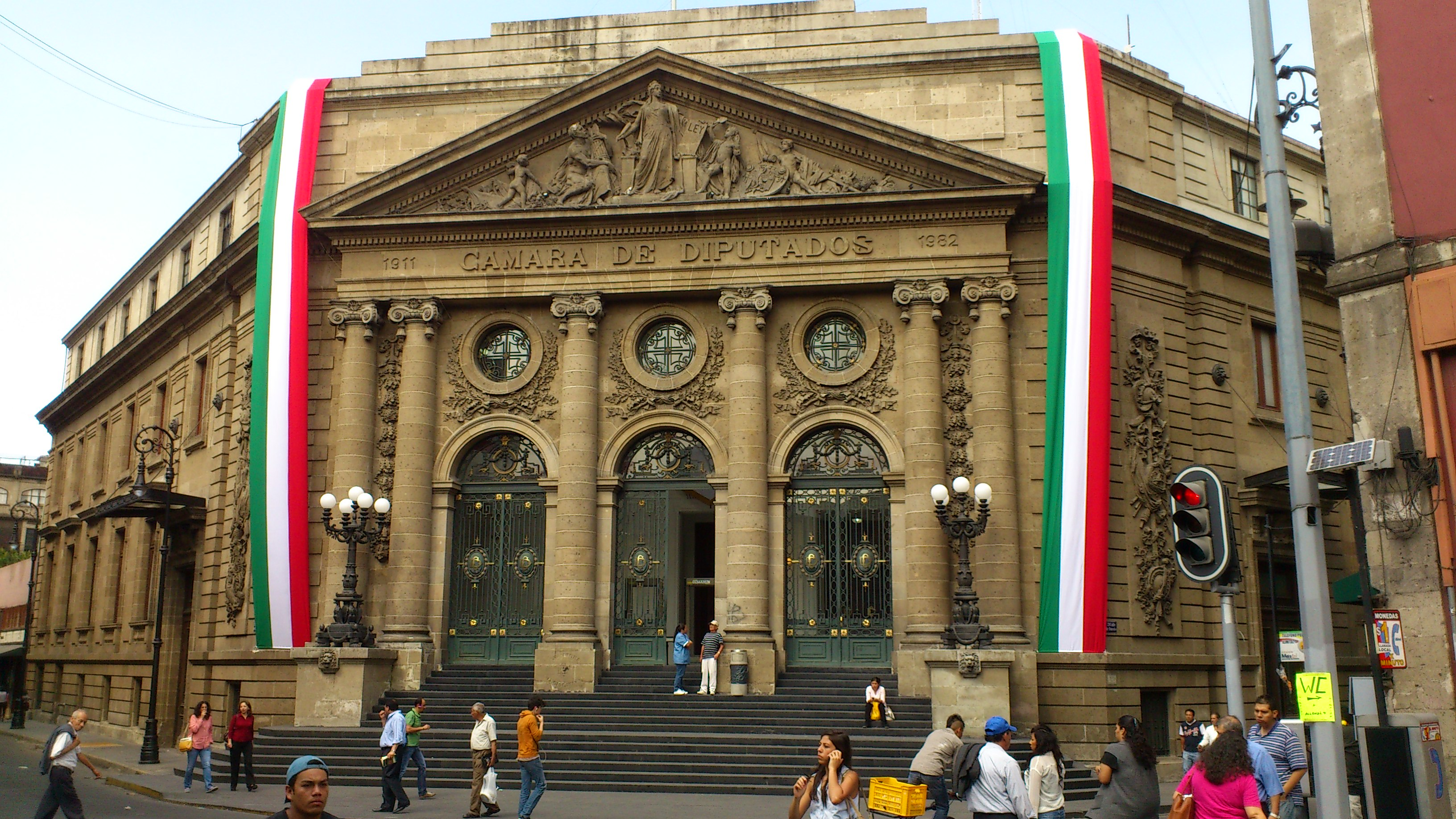
Palacio Legislativo de Donceles: former Chamber of Deputies building, now the seat of the Congress of Mexico City.

Jorge Meixueiro Hernández (1907 – 18 August 1943) was a Mexican lawyer and politician affiliated with the National Revolutionary Party (PNR) and the Party of the Mexican Revolution (PRM), the forerunners of the Institutional Revolutionary Party (PRI). He served three terms in the Chamber of Deputies in the 1920s and 1930s before dying by suicide in the congressional chamber in protest at what he perceived as electoral fraud denying him a fourth term.

== Political career ==
Jorge Meixueiro Hernández was born in Ixtlán de Juárez, Oaxaca, in 1907, to Guillermo Meixueiro, who served in the Senate and as interim governor of Oaxaca in 1914. To complete his schooling, he moved to the city of Oaxaca, where he earned a law degree from the Institute of Sciences and Arts of Oaxaca.

In the 1928 general election he was elected to Congress for the first time, for Oaxaca's 5th district. He was re-elected to Congress in 1930, for Oaxaca's 3rd district. Finally, he was elected for Oaxaca's 4th district in 1937.

He ran for Congress again in the 1943 legislative election, contending Oaxaca's 2nd district (Tlacolula) for the PRM. The electoral authorities, however, ruled that that the district had been won by his opponent, the independent Leopoldo Gatica Neri. On 18 August 1943, he took the stand before the Chamber of Deputies and denounced what he described as the fraud perpetrated against him:

Because I am no novice in these matters, I know the meaning of the silence seen from my colleagues (...) I know that to try and prevent this would be like trying to melt the snow on a volcano with a match (...) and since on this occasion I cannot keep my word, I want to make my last argument and take my leave.

He then pulled out a .38 calibre pistol from his pocket, put it in his mouth, and pulled the trigger. Alan Valverde, another deputy who was also a physician, declared him dead, and the session was suspended until the following day.

== Aftermath ==
On 20 August 1943, the Mexico City daily El Universal published an article titled Meixueiro mató ayer al PRM ("Yesterday Meixueiro killed the PRM"); however, the party and its successors remained in power for the following 57 years. Gatica Neri became the object of public scorn, particularly after a 24 September interview in Excélsior in which he claimed that he had won fair and square, that the governor of Oaxaca sought to impose Meixueiro as the winner, and that Meixueiro's suicide was the result of a "moment of confusion". The election in Oaxaca's 2nd was annulled on 12 November; a special election was called for the district, which eventually took place in 1946, towards the end of the congressional session.
