= Cándido Coheto =

Mexican politician

Vitálico Cándido Coheto Martínez (born 4 September 1941) is a Mexican politician from the Institutional Revolutionary Party (PRI).

He has been elected to the Chamber of Deputies on three occasions:

- In the 1991 mid-term election, for Oaxaca's second district.
- In the 2000 general election, for Oaxaca's fourth district.
- In the 2015 mid-terms, for Oaxaca's fourth district. During that term in office, he chaired the Chamber's Indigenous Affairs Committee.

He stood again for Oaxaca's fourth in the 2021 mid-terms but placed second behind Azael Santiago Chepi of the National Regeneration Movement (Morena).
