= José Luis Luege Tamargo =

Member of Chamber of Deputies

José Luis Luege Tamargo (born November 9, 1953, in Mexico City, Mexico) is a Mexican politician and bureaucrat. Luege holds a degree in Chemical and Metallurgical Engineering at UNAM, where he taught for five years. He obtained two specialties in iron and steel processes, one at the National Autonomous University of Mexico and another at the "National Center for Iron and Steel Processes" in Madrid. He worked for 14 years in the national iron and steel industry.

== His career ==
- Luege Tamargo's political career began in the early 1980s and in 1988 he was elected to the federal Chamber of Deputies, representing the National Action Party in the Seventeenth Federal Electoral District of the Federal District. He participated in the Ecology, Industry, Trade and Federal District Commissions.
- From 1994 to 1997, he served as Representative of the Federal District Legislative Assembly, where he headed the Commission for Urban Roads and Highway Administration. During this period, he achieved consensus for a new law of transport for the capital and took part in crucial studies on the problem of transport and highway administration from a metropolitan perspective.
- From 1990 to 1995, he was PAN representative in the National Commission for the Surveillance of the Federal Voters' Register, where he encouraged the reorganization of the Federal Voters' list and the issuing of a new voting card with a photograph and during the period from 94-87, he was also a replacement deputy for the general IFE Council.
- From 1999 to 2003, Luege has been President of the PAN Regional Board of Directors in the Federal District for two periods.
- He is currently a member of the National Council and since February 2002, has been a member of the National Executive Committee.
- On 2003, he was appointed Attorney General for Environmental Protection.
- On 2005, he was appointed Head of the Secretariat of the Environment and Natural Resources.
- On 1 December 2006, he was appointed Director General of the National Water Commission by President Felipe Calderón.
