= Heriberto Ambrosio =

Mexican politician

- Born: 16 March 1968 (age 58); Oaxaca, Mexico
- Occupation: Politician
- Political party: PRI

Heriberto Ambrosio Cipriano (born 16 March 1968) is a Mexican politician from the Institutional Revolutionary Party (PRI). In the 2009 mid-terms he was elected to the Chamber of Deputies to represent the fourth district of Oaxaca during the 61st Congress.
