= Jacobo Sánchez López =

Mexican politician

- Born: 20 October 1955 (age 70); Río Manso, Oaxaca, Mexico
- Education: UABJO
- Occupation: Politician
- Political party: PRI

Jacobo Sánchez López (born 20 October 1955) is a Mexican politician affiliated with the Institutional Revolutionary Party. As of 2014 he served as Deputy of the LIX Legislature of the Mexican Congress representing Oaxaca.
