= Alfredo Hernández Raigosa =

Mexican politician (1963–2022)

Member of the Chamber of Deputies of Mexico
- In office 28 August 2000 – 31 August 2003

Personal details
- Born: 12 January 1963; Mexico City, Mexico
- Died: 29 June 2022 (aged 59)
- Political party: Democratic Revolution; Morena

Alfredo Hernández Raigosa (12 January 1963 – 29 June 2022) was a Mexican politician. He served as a member of the Chamber of Deputies of Mexico from 2000 to 2003. Raigosa died in June 2022, at the age of 59.
