= Jorge González Ilescas =

Mexican politician

- Born: 30 December 1956 (age 69); Oaxaca, Oaxaca, Mexico
- Occupation: Politician
- Political party: PRI

Jorge Venustiano González Ilescas (born 30 December 1956) is a Mexican politician from the Institutional Revolutionary Party. He has served as Deputy of the LIV and LXI Legislatures of the Mexican Congress representing Oaxaca.
