= Eva Diego Cruz =

Mexican politician

- Born: 2 May 1975 (age 51); Córdoba, Veracruz, Mexico
- Education: UABJO
- Occupation: Deputy
- Political party: PRD

Eva Diego Cruz (born 2 May 1975) is a Mexican politician affiliated with the PRD. She served as a federal deputy in the LXII Legislature of the Mexican Congress representing Oaxaca, and previously served in the Congress of Oaxaca.
