= Patricia Villanueva Abraján =

Mexican politician

- Born: 15 February 1955 (age 71); Oaxaca, Mexico
- Occupation: Politician
- Political party: PRI

Patricia Villanueva Abraján (born 15 February 1955) is a Mexican politician affiliated with the Institutional Revolutionary Party. As of 2014 she served as Deputy of the LIII and LX Legislatures of the Mexican Congress representing Oaxaca.
