= Silvia Oliva Fragoso =

Mexican politician

- Born: 8 November 1947 (age 78); Mexico City, Mexico
- Occupation: Politician
- Political party: PRD

Silvia Oliva Fragoso (born 8 November 1947) is a Mexican politician affiliated with the Party of the Democratic Revolution (PRD). She has served as a federal deputy on two occasions: during the 57th Congress (1997–2000), and again during the 60th Congress (2006–2009), for the Federal District's 19th district.
