= Carol Antonio Altamirano =

Mexican politician (born 1963)

- Born: 13 December 1963 (age 62); Asunción Ixtaltepec, Oaxaca, Mexico
- Occupation: Politician
- Political party: PRD; MORENA

Carol Antonio Altamirano (Note: In this Mexican name, the surname is Antonio and the second or maternal family name is Altamirano.) (born 13 December 1963) is a Mexican politician and lawyer. He was previously affiliated with the Party of the Democratic Revolution (PRD) but has since aligned with the National Regeneration Movement (Morena).

Carol Antonio Altamirano was born in Asunción Ixtaltepec, Oaxaca, on 13 December 1963. He served as the municipal president of his home town in 2008–2010 and in the Congress of Oaxaca in 2010–2012 and 2016–2018.

He has been elected to the Chamber of Deputies to represent the fifth district of Oaxaca on four occasions: in the 2012 general election, for the PRD; and in the 2018 general election, the 2021 mid-terms, and the 2024 general election, on the Morena ticket.
