= María Angélica Díaz del Campo =

Mexican politician

- Born: 17 August 1965 (age 60)
- Education: UVM
- Occupation: Politician
- Political party: PRD

María Angélica Díaz del Campo (born 17 August 1965) is a Mexican politician affiliated with the Party of the Democratic Revolution. As of 2014 she served as Deputy of the LIX Legislature of the Mexican Congress representing the Federal District.
