= María Araceli Vázquez Camacho =

Mexican politician

- Born: 16 March 1948 (age 78); Mexico City, Mexico
- Occupation: Politician
- Political party: PRD

María Araceli Vázquez Camacho (born 16 March 1948) is a Mexican politician from the Party of the Democratic Revolution. From 2009 to 2012 she served as Deputy of the LXI Legislature of the Mexican Congress representing the Federal District.
