= 11th federal electoral district of Oaxaca =

Defunct federal electoral district of Mexico

Coordinates: 16°20′N 98°03′W

The 11th federal electoral district of Oaxaca (Spanish: Distrito electoral federal 11 de Oaxaca) was a Mexican federal electoral district from 1997 to 2018. During its existence, it returned one deputy to the Chamber of Deputies for each three-year legislative period by means of the first-past-the-post system. Votes cast in the district also counted towards the calculation of proportional representation ("plurinominal") deputies elected from the country's electoral regions.

Oaxaca's 11th district was created by the Federal Electoral Institute (IFE) as part of its 1996 redistricting process, which assigned the state an additional district to the ten it already had. In the 2017 redistricting process, Oaxaca's seat allocation was again reduced to ten. The 11th district was thus first contested in the 1997 mid-term election and it elected its final deputy in the 2015 mid-terms.

== District territory ==
Evolution of electoral district numbers
	1974	1978	1996	2005	2017	2023
Oaxaca	9	10	11	11	10	10
Chamber of Deputies	196	300				

Throughout its existence, the 11th district's head town (cabecera distrital), where results from individual polling stations were gathered together and tallied, was the city of Pinotepa Nacional. Located in the state's Costa Chica region, it covered 40 municipalities under the 2005 districting plan and 38 under the 1996 plan.

== Deputies returned to Congress ==
(Mexico) National parties
- Current
- PAN
- PRI
- PT
- PVEM
- MC
- Morena
- Defunct or local only
- PLM
- PNR
- PRM
- PNM
- PP
- PPS
- PARM
- PFCRN
- Convergencia
- PANAL
- PSD
- PES
- PES
- PRD

Oaxaca's 11th district
Election	Deputy	Party	Term	Legislature
1997	Luisa Cortés Carrillo	Institutional Revolutionary Party	1997–2000	57th Congress
2000	Nahum Ildefonso Zorrilla Cuevas	Institutional Revolutionary Party	2000–2003	58th Congress
2003	Gonzalo Ruiz Cerón (Note: Ruiz Cerón resigned his seat on 13 March 2006 and was replaced by his alternate, Cabrera Rivero.); Pedro Gustavo Cabrera Rivero	Institutional Revolutionary Party	2003–2006; 2006	59th Congress
2006	Joaquín de los Santos Molina	Party of the Democratic Revolution	2006–2009	60th Congress
2009	José Antonio Yglesias Arreola	Institutional Revolutionary Party	2009–2012	61st Congress
2012	Delfina Guzmán Díaz	Party of the Democratic Revolution	2012–2015	62nd Congress
2015	Carlos Sarabia Camacho	Institutional Revolutionary Party	2015–2018	63rd Congress
