= Guanajuato =

State of Mexico

Guanajuato Kuahnasï Juáta (Purépecha)
- State
- Free and Sovereign State of Guanajuato Estado Libre y Soberano de Guanajuato (Spanish); Hyodi Uanahuatö (Otomí)
- Flag Coat of arms

- State of Guanajuato within Mexico
- Coordinates: 21°1′N 101°16′W
- Country: Mexico
- Capital: Guanajuato
- Largest City: León de Los Aldama
- Largest metro: Greater León
- Municipalities: 46
- Admission: December 20, 1823
- Order: 2nd

Government
  - Governor: Libia García Muñoz Ledo (PAN)
  - Legislature: Congress of Guanajuato
  - Senators: Ricardo Sheffield Padilla (Morena); Virginia Magaña Fonseca (Ecologist Green Party); Miguel Márquez Márquez (PAN)
  - Deputies: Federal deputies: • Luis Gerardo Sánchez Sánchez (1st); • Alma Rosa de la Vega Vargas (2nd); • Fernando Torres Graciano (3rd); • Francisco Javier Estrada Domínguez (4th); • Éctor Jaime Ramírez Barba (5th); • Cristina Márquez Alcalá (6th); • Diana Gutiérrez Valtierra (7th); • Ernesto Prieto Gallardo (8th); • Diego Rodríguez Barroso (9th); • Alejandro Calderón Díaz (10th); • Miguel Salim Alle (11th); • Magdalena Rosales Cruz (12th); • Lucero Higareda Segura (13th); • Juana Acosta Trujillo (14th); • José Javier Aguirre Gallardo (15th)

Area
  - Total: 30,607 km^{2} (11,817 sq mi)
- Ranked 22nd
- Highest elevation: 3,110 m (10,200 ft)

Population (2020)
  - Total: 6,166,934
  - Rank: 6th
  - Density: 201.49/km^{2} (521.85/sq mi)
  - Rank: 5th
- Demonym: Guanajuatense

GDP (2022)
  - Total: MXN 1.212 trillion (US$60.3 billion)
  - Per capita: US$9,568
- Time zone: UTC−6 (CST)
- Postal code: 36–38
- Area code: Area codes: • 411; • 412; • 413; • 415; • 417; • 418; • 419; • 421; • 428; • 429; • 432; • 438; • 442; • 445; • 456; • 461; • 462; • 464; • 466; • 468; • 469; • 472; • 473; • 476; • 477
- ISO 3166 code: MX-GUA
- HDI: ▲0.769 high ranked 26th of 32
- Website: Official Web site
- a. The state's GDP was MXN 329,720,355,000 in 2008, an amount corresponding to US$25,759,402,740, a dollar being worth 12.80 pesos (value as of June 3, 2010).

Guanajuato, (Note: Spanish pronunciation: [gwanaˈxwato]) officially the Free and Sovereign State of Guanajuato, (Note: Spanish: Estado Libre y Soberano de Guanajuato) is one of the 32 states that make up the Federal Entities of Mexico. It is divided into 46 municipalities and its capital city is Guanajuato.

It is located in central Mexico and is bordered by the states of Jalisco to the west, Zacatecas to the northwest, San Luis Potosí to the north, Querétaro to the east, and Michoacán to the south. It covers an area of 30,608 km^{2} (11,818 sq mi). The state is home to several historically important cities, especially those along the "Bicentennial Route", which retraces the path of Miguel Hidalgo y Costilla's insurgent army at the beginning of the Mexican War of Independence. This route begins at Dolores Hidalgo, and passes through the Sanctuary of Atotonilco, San Miguel de Allende, Celaya, and the capital of Guanajuato. Other important cities in the state include León, the state's biggest city, Salamanca, and Irapuato. The first town established by the Spaniards in Guanajuato is Acámbaro while the first to be named a city is Salvatierra.

Guanajuato is between the arid north of the country and the lusher south, and is geographically part of the Trans-Mexican Volcanic Belt, the Mexican Plateau. It was initially settled by the Spanish in the 1520s due to mineral deposits found around the city of Guanajuato, but areas such as the Bajío region also became important for agriculture and livestock. Mining and agriculture were the mainstays of the state's economy, but have since been eclipsed by the secondary sector. Guanajuato has particularly seen growth in the automotive industry. The name Guanajuato comes from Purépecha kuanhasï juáta (or in older spelling quanax huato), which means 'frog hill'.

== Geography ==
Guanajuato is in the center of Mexico, northwest of Mexico City, bordering Zacatecas, San Luis Potosí, Michoacán, Querétaro, and Jalisco. It is the 20th-largest of Mexico's states, with an area of 30,589 km^{2}. It has an average altitude of 2,015 meters (6,611 ft) above sea level, with its territory divided among three of Mexico's physical regions, the Sierra Madre Oriental, the Mexican Plateau and the Trans-Mexican Volcanic Belt. The Sierra Madre Oriental in Guanajuato consists of the Sierra Gorda and the Sierra del Azafrán in the northeast. The Mexican Plateau extends through the center of the state. It is subdivided into various regions parted by low-lying mountain chains such as the Sierra de la Cuatralba and the Sierra de Cubo. The Trans Mexican Volcanic Belt crosses the state in the south and includes the Bajío area, the Altos de Jalisco and the valleys area in the far south. The state is crossed by several mountain ranges with mountains between 2,300 and 3,000 meters high. Mountain ranges average 2,305 meters and flat areas lie at around 1,725 meters above mean sea level. Other important mountain ranges include the Sierra Gorda to the north, the Sierra de Guanajuato in the southeast, the Comanja in the northwest and the Codorniz in the east.

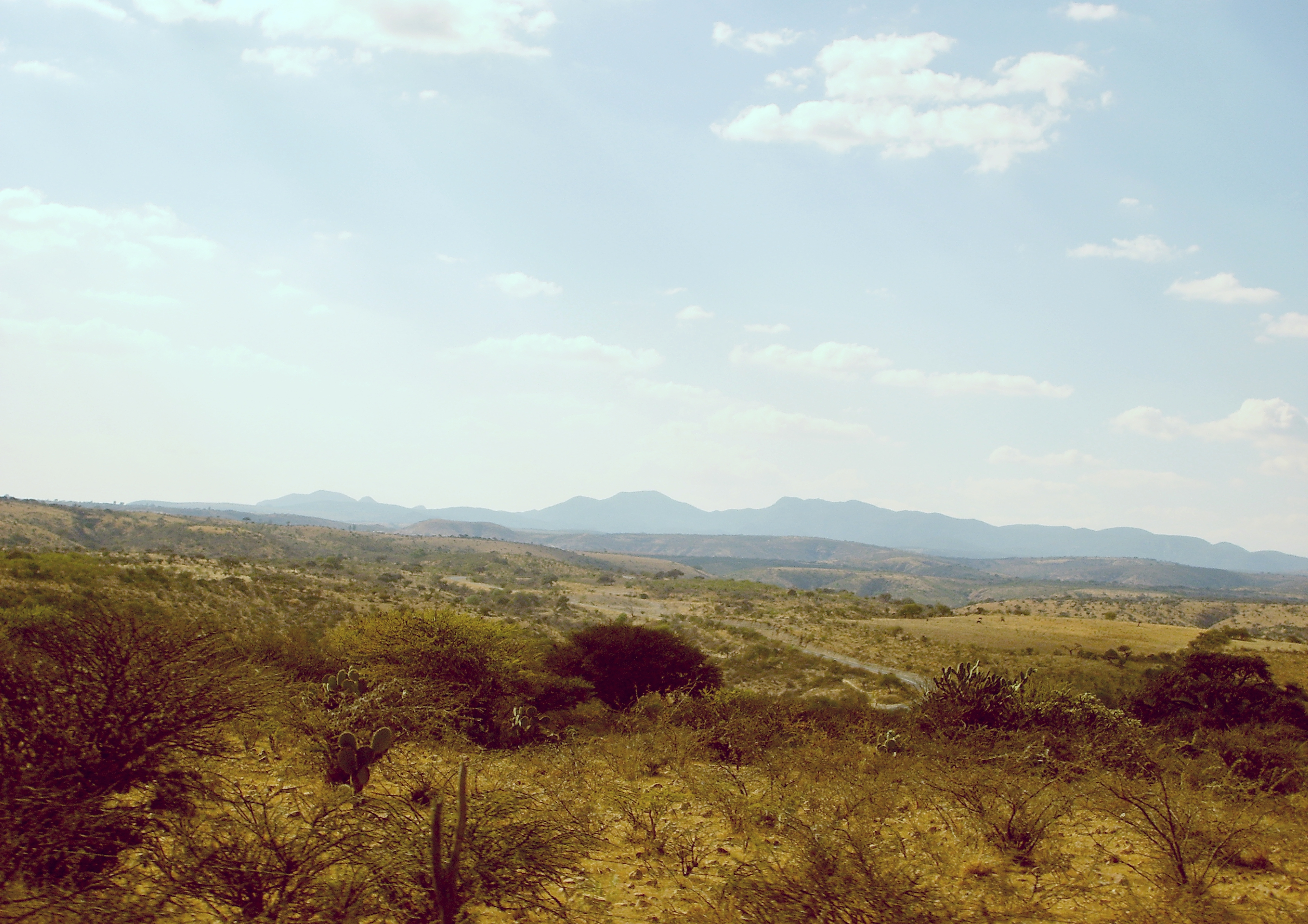
Matorral in Dolores Hidalgo Municipality

The state is divided into five regions, taking into consideration geography and climate: Altos de Guanajuato (the Highlands of Guanajuato), La Sierra Central (the Central Mountain Range), Bajío (the Lowlands), La Sierra Gorda (the Fat Mountain Range), and Los Valles del Sur (the Southern Valleys). The Altos de Guanajuato, in the north, are a chain of forested mountains interspersed with pastures, small fields and areas with cacti and other desert plants. They begin near the border with San Luis Potosí, and extend south to Dolores Hidalgo, San Miguel de Allende, and the Querétaro border. This area's altitude varies from 1,800 meters (5,900 ft) to peaks over 2,900 meters (9,500 ft), such as La Giganta (the Giantess) and La Sierra del Cubo (the Mountain Range of the Cube). The climate is mostly semiarid with a rainy season in the summer, with average temperatures between 15 and 20 °C (59 and 68 °F). Winter lows often reach 0 °C (32 °F) or lower with frosts. Wildlife is found mostly in the most rugged and inaccessible areas and includes deer, coyotes, eagles and rattlesnakes.

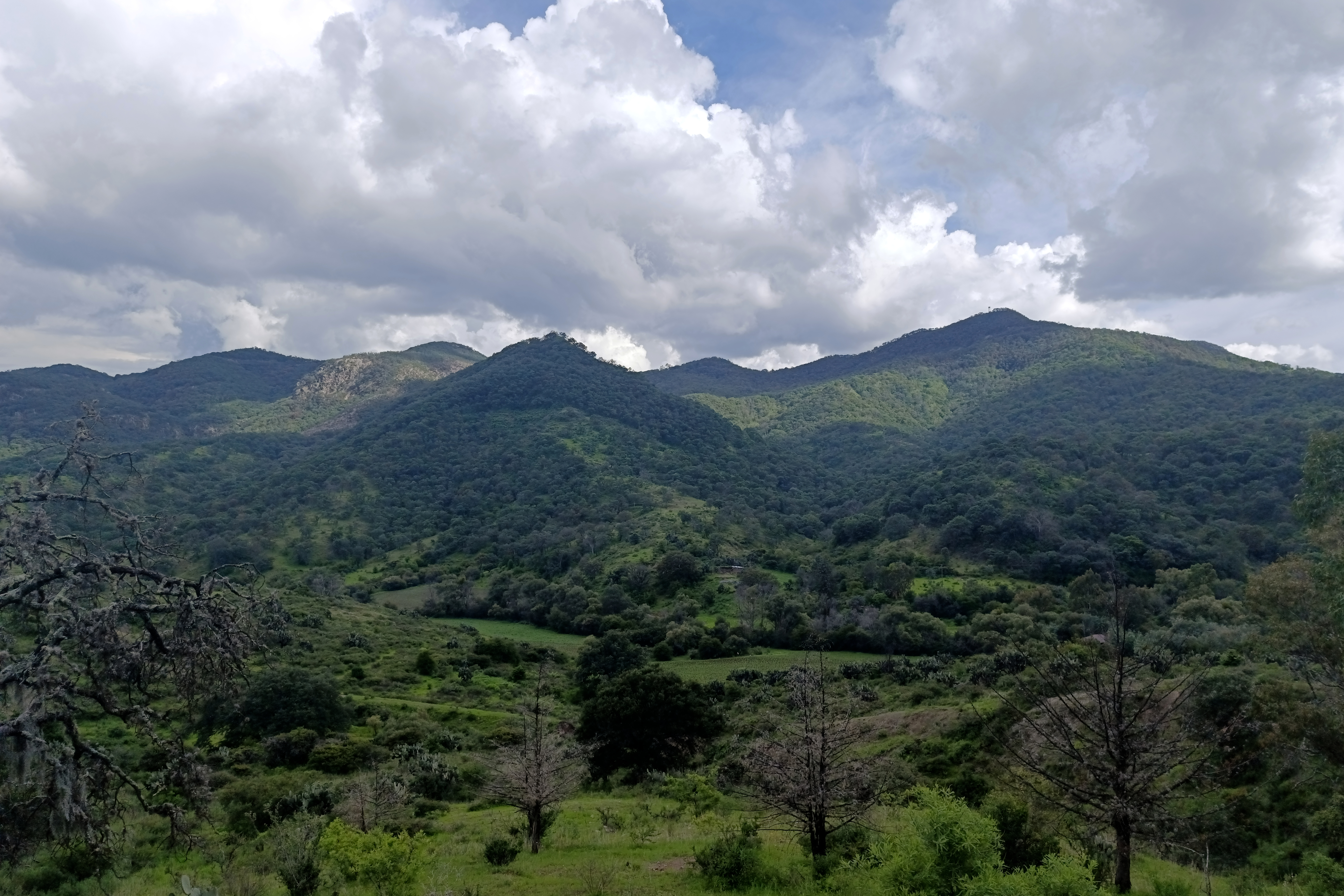
Oak forest in the Sierra de Santa Rosa

La Sierra Gorda is shared between Guanajuato and Querétaro and is considered an important biosphere. This area is the most rugged in the state where most of the natural areas and small villages remain intact due to their inaccessibility. The Sierra Gorda is part of the Sierra Madre Occidental (Western Mothern Mountain Range), with extreme variations in its geography and climate. The rugged terrain means that there are a wide number and variety of micro-climates, although average temperatures vary only between 16 and 19 °C (61 and 66 °F). It lowest point is a canyon called Paso de Hormigas (Ant Pass) in Xichú at 650 meters (2,130 ft) above sea level with a very warm climate suitable for tropical fruit. The highest point is Pinal de Zamorano (Zamorano's Pine forrest) at 3,300 meters (10,800 ft), followed by El Picacho de Pueblo Nuevo (the Picacho of New Town), El Zorillo (the Skunk) and El Cuervo (the Raven), all above 2,700 meters (8,900 ft). The largest changes are seen in arid versus wetter zones, which can often be relatively nearby, with foliage changing from rainforest to pine forest to desert landscapes. In 1997, the federal government declared the Sierra Gorda region in Querétaro a Biosphere Reserve, with Guanajuato's portion added in 2007. On the Guanajuato side, it covers 236,882 hectares over the municipalities of Xichú, San Luis de la Paz, Atarjea, Victoria and Santa Catarina. Culturally, the Sierra Gorda region is the far western part of La Huasteca, which extends over parts of Querétaro, San Luis Potosí, Hidalgo and Veracruz.

The Sierra Central is a series of low, gentle mountains in the center of the state that are part of the Sierra Madre Occidental. They cover 12 municipalities: Ocampo, San Felipe, León, Silao, Guanajuato, Dolores Hidalgo, San Miguel de Allende, Irapuato, Salamanca, Santa Cruz de Juventino Rosas, Comonfort and Apaseo el Grande. Wild vegetation runs from tropical rainforest to arid grasslands with cactus, with cypress trees along rivers and other surface water. Wildlife includes raccoons, quail, rabbits, skunks and migratory birds. The land is productive, especially for fruit orchards producing guavas, tejocote, apples, limes, quince and more. Desert fruits such as cactus pears (tuna), garambullos and xoconostle are also produced commercially.

The state's best-known geographical region is the Bajío, a relatively low and flat area of between 1,700 and 1,800 meters that surrounds the Lerma River and its tributaries. Centered in Guanajuato, parts also extend into Querétaro and Jalisco. This low area is the source of its name, coming from the Spanish word bajo or low. The Bajío is filled with rolling hills and interrupted by the occasional chain of low mountains such as the Gavia and the Culiacán. Before the Spanish arrived, this area was covered in dense forests of holm oak and mesquite trees, but mining's need for wood fuel eventually cleared them. Today, the area is the center of most of the state's agriculture and industry since the terrain allows for highways and large farms, which produce grains, vegetables and fruit. This farmland is considered some of Mexico's most productive.

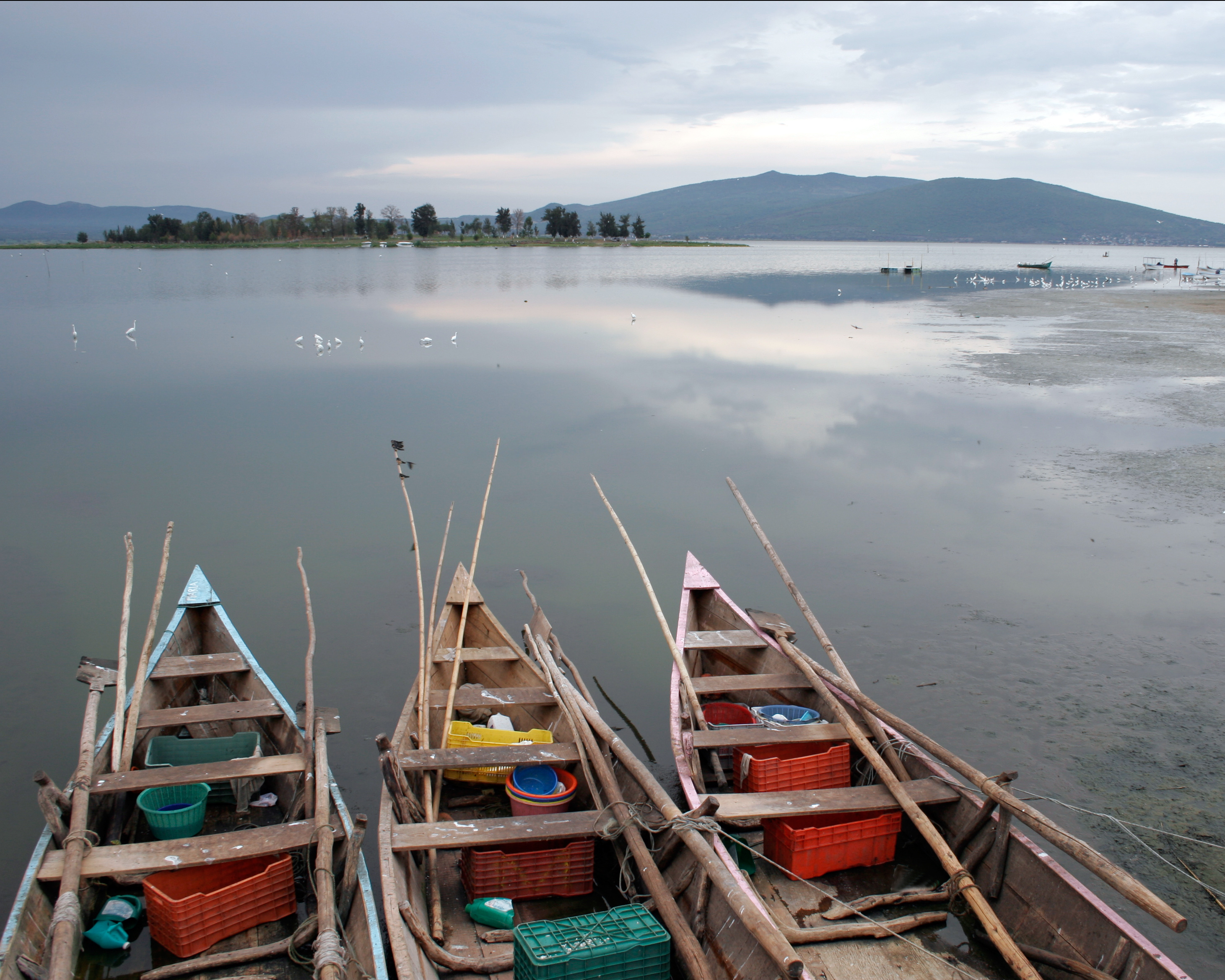
Lake Yuriria was artificially enlarged in 1548 through a canal to the Lerma River, making it one of the oldest engineered hydraulic works in the Americas.

Los Valles del Sur, also called the Valles Abajeños, are valleys located in southwestern Guanajuato, bordering Michoacán. This area is distinguished by the large number of Purépecha place names and covers the municipalities of Valle de Santiago, Yuriria, Tarimoro, Apaseo el Alto, Moroleón, Uriangato, Santiago Maravatío, Acámbaro, Jerécuaro, Coroneo and Tarandacuao. The area is part of the Trans-Mexican Volcanic Belt, with elevations ranging between 1,700 and 2,000 meters. The soil is fertile due to its volcanic base, producing crops such as sorghum, wheat, corn and vegetables. The land also produces building materials such as tezontle and black sandstone. In the higher elevations, there are forests of pine and holm oak but these have been much reduced by deforestation. The more arid areas have mesquite, nopal and other desert plants. There are several small lakes, the best known being Lake Yuriria as well as canyons and cave systems, some of which were used for ceremonial purposes by pre-Hispanic peoples. It is also the home of the Siete Luminarias de Valle de Santiago (Seven Luminaries of Saint James Valley), a set of seven inactive volcanic craters in the northwest and southwest of the Santiago Valley. The volcano cones rise abruptly out of the ground with craters up to one kilometer across. Locals call the formations "holes" (hoyos) and they are named La Alberca (the Pool), La Cíntora, Estrada, Blanca (White), Alvarez, Solís and Rincón de Parangueo (Prangueo's Corner). La Cíntora and Rincón de Parangueo contain cave paintings and evidence that people once lived in the craters. La Alberca ("The Pool") is a crater lake open to the public for swimming, rowing or boating. The name of Siete Luminarias ("Seven Lanterns") comes from an imagined prehistoric time when the seven were active at once.

The state has about 1,500 bodies of surface water, along with underground aquifers in most parts of the state. Its principal lake is Lake Cuitzeo, on the border with Michoacán and the Yuriria. Several of the Siete Luminarias craters have also developed crater lakes, especially La Joya, Parangueo and Olla de Zìntora. The most important river in Guanajuato and one of the most important in the country is the Lerma, along with its tributaries Guanajuato River, La Laja, and Turbio. The Lerma river basin covers 81% of the state (center and south); the Pánuco River basin (north of the state) and Cuitzeo Lake cover the remainder. The Lerma is regulated by various dams in part to control the fact that it ran very high in the rainy season and very low in the dry season. These dams include the Ignacio Allende, la Purísima, Solís, La Gavia, Conejo II and Santa Ifigenia.

=== Climate ===
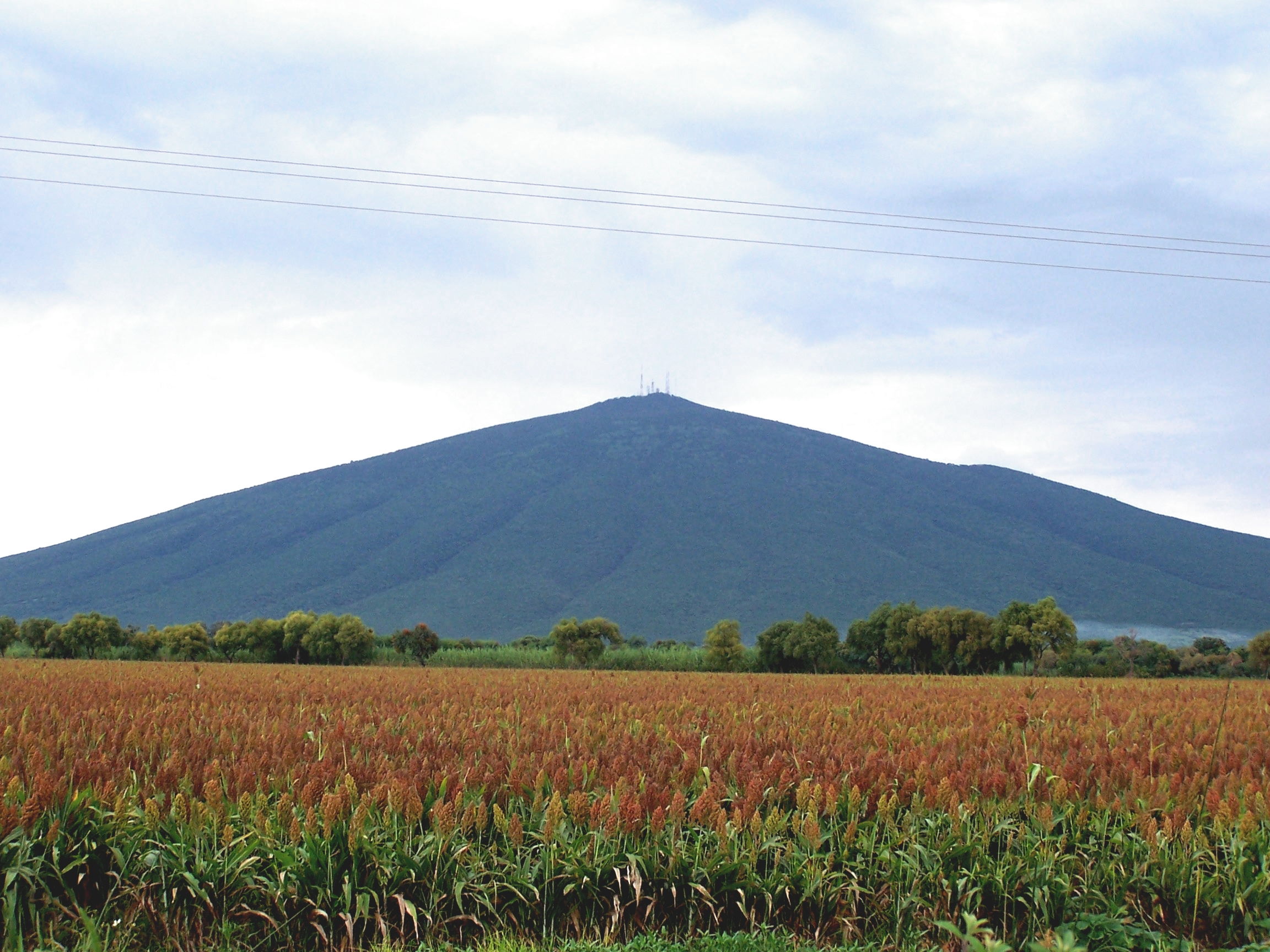
Cerro Culiacán viewed from a sorghum field in Jaral del Progreso

Climates in the state are grouped by precipitation and average temperatures into three major groups. The semiarid climate is characterized by the fact that evaporation often exceeds precipitation. Most of the vegetation in these areas is arid grassland with desert plants such as nopal. These climates cover about 40% of the state, mostly in the north. Semiarid temperate regions are found in the municipalities of San Felipe, San Diego de la Unión, San Luis de la Paz, part of Dolores Hidalgo and San José de Iturbide, where precipitation varies between 400 and 500 mm and the average temperature is between 16 and 18 °C (61 and 64 °F). Semiarid semihot climates can be found north of Dolores Hidalgo, around León and in areas near Celaya. In these municipalities, rainfall averages between 600 and 700 mm and the average annual temperature is between 18 and 20 °C (64 and 68 °F). Temperate climates are judged by the presence of oak and pine forest, pine forests and/or pine forests with meadows. Humidity varies in these forest regions. Temperate semi-moist areas are mostly found in the southeast municipalities of Apaseo, Coroneo and Jerécuaro and in the center of the state. Precipitation varies from 600 to 700 mm and the average temperature is between 16 and 18 °C. Temperate and somewhat humid climates have rainfall averages of between 700 and 800 mm, with temperatures between 16 and 18 °C. These can be found in Pénjamo, Coroneo, Jerécuaro and parts of Guanajuato (municipality) and Dolores Hidalgo. Temperate climates with the most humidity are in Santa Rosa and municipality of Guanajuato. These have rainfall averages over 800 mm and average temperatures under 16 °C. Hot and moist climates in the state have temperatures ranging from 18 and 22 °C (64 and 72 °F) and are associated with tropical rainforest, with some grassland. These climates are subdivided into two types, one that receives less rainfall with a significant dry season and one that is wetter. The drier type is found in Abasolo, Irapuato, Salamanca and Romita. In total, these hot and relatively moist climates can be found in about 40% of the state.

=== Ecology ===
From the beginning of the colonial period, much of Guanajato's environment suffered greatly from the mining techniques and intensive agriculture the Spanish introduced. The process has been ongoing since then to modern times. Before the conquest, the state was covered in forests, but mining requires large amounts of fuel to process minerals, so they were cut down for fuel and construction projects. Agriculture leached nutrients from the soil, caused erosion, and introduced plants, animals and diseases that have had a large impact.

Today, the state contains 21 protected areas that extend over 63,611 hectares in 26 municipalities. These include Sierra de Lobos, Siete Luminarias, the Silva Dam, Megaparque de Dolores Hidalgo, Cuenca de la Esperanza, Las Fuentes, Peña Alta, Pinal de Zamorano, Parque Metropolitano, La Joya Crater, Lake Yuriria, Las Musas, Culiacán and La Gavia Mountains, Sierra de los Agustinos, Sierra de Pénjamo, Cerro de Cubilete, Cerro de Amoles, La Purisima Dam, Arandas Mountain, La Soledad Dam, and the upper basin of the Temascatío River. Another protected area is the Sierra Gorda Biosphere Reserve. In Guanajuato, it extends over 236,882 hectares and contains 182 bird species, 42 mammal species and 84 plant species, including two recently discovered ones, Beaucamea compacta and Beaucarnea glassiana (formerly known as Calibanus glassianus). The park contains a number of species in danger of extinction, including the black bear and the puma. The climate is semiarid with variations in temperature due to altitude changes, but most of the area is covered in tropical forest in which many plants lose leaves during the dry season from November to May.

Flora and fauna of Guanajuato

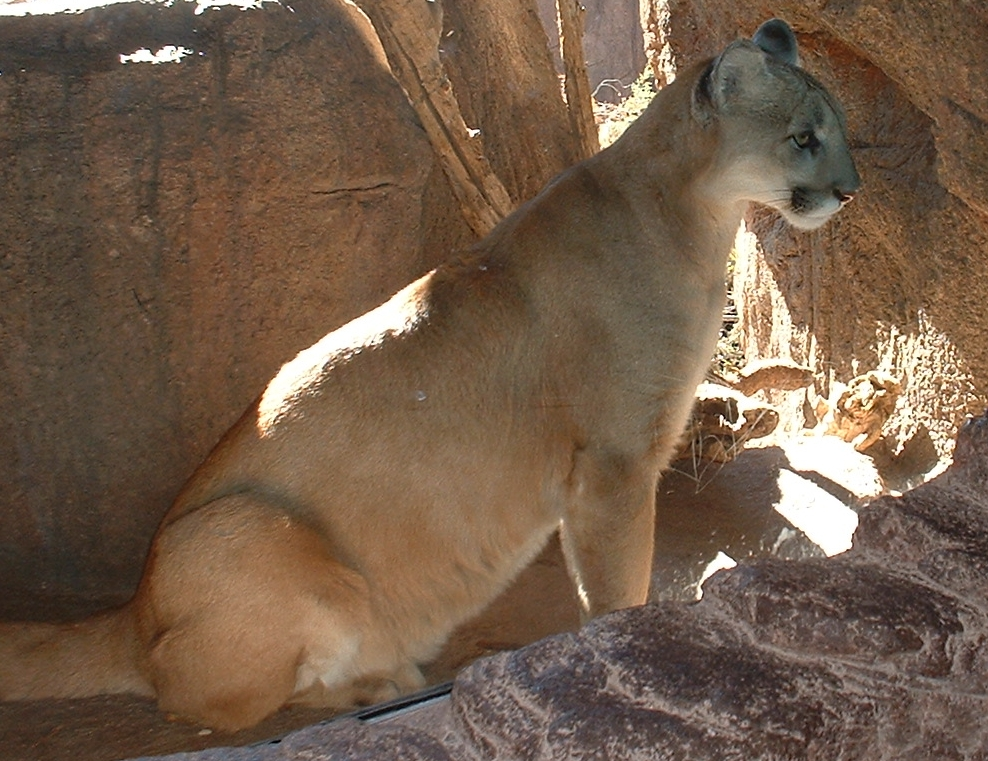
Puma concolor

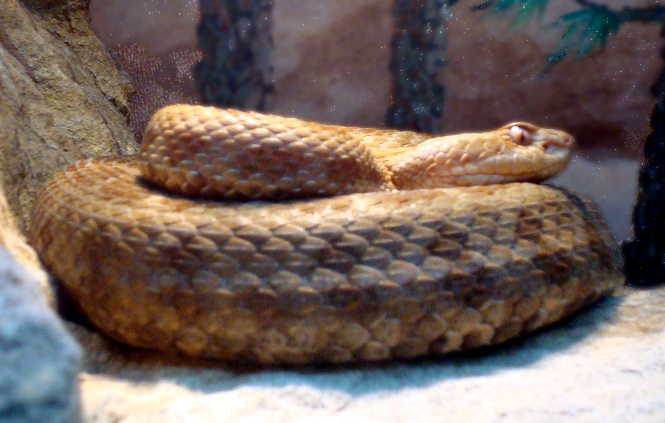
Crotalus aquilus

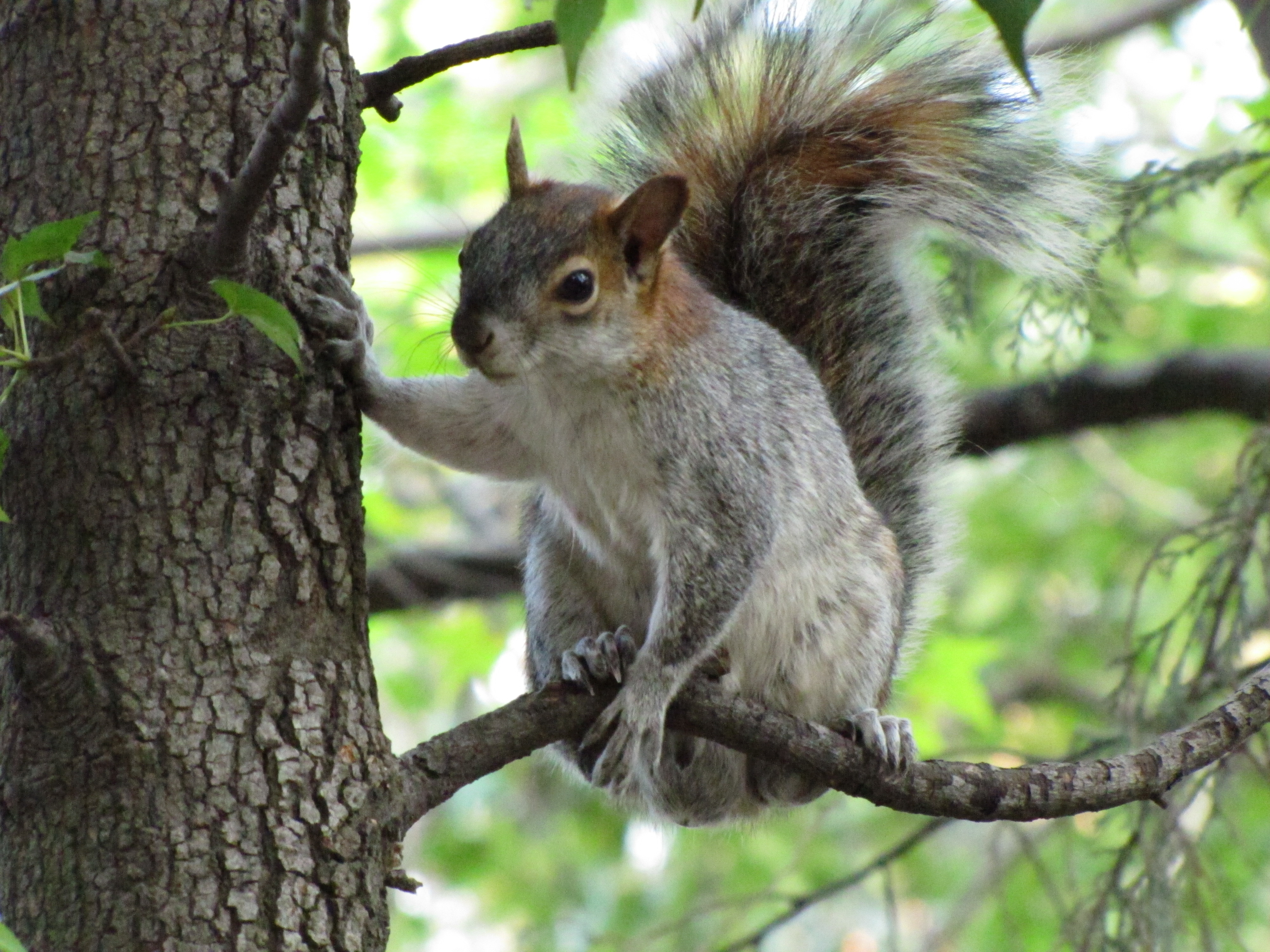
Sciurus aureogaster

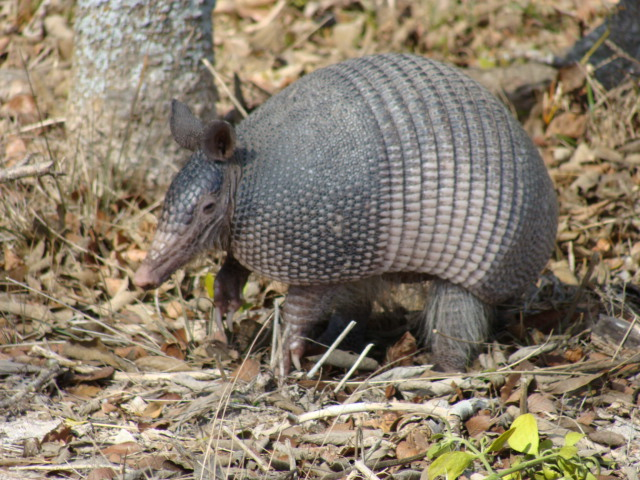
Dasypus novemcinctus

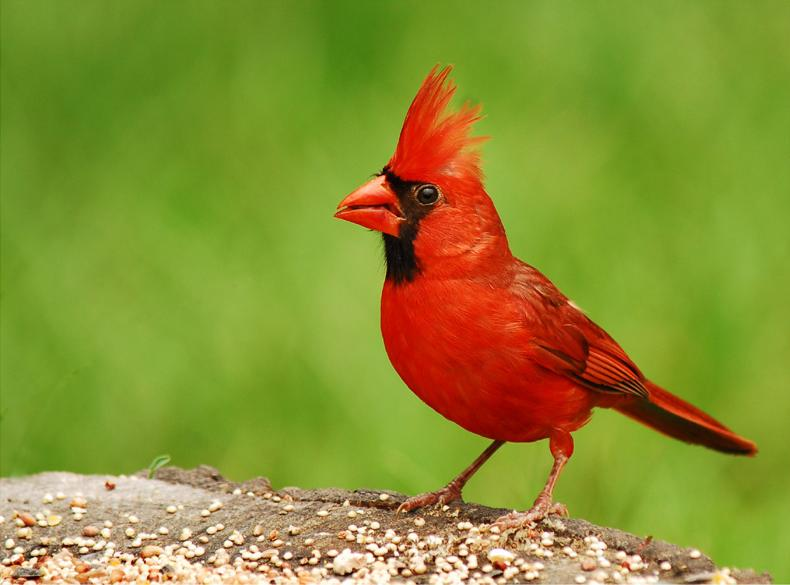
Cardinalis cardinalis

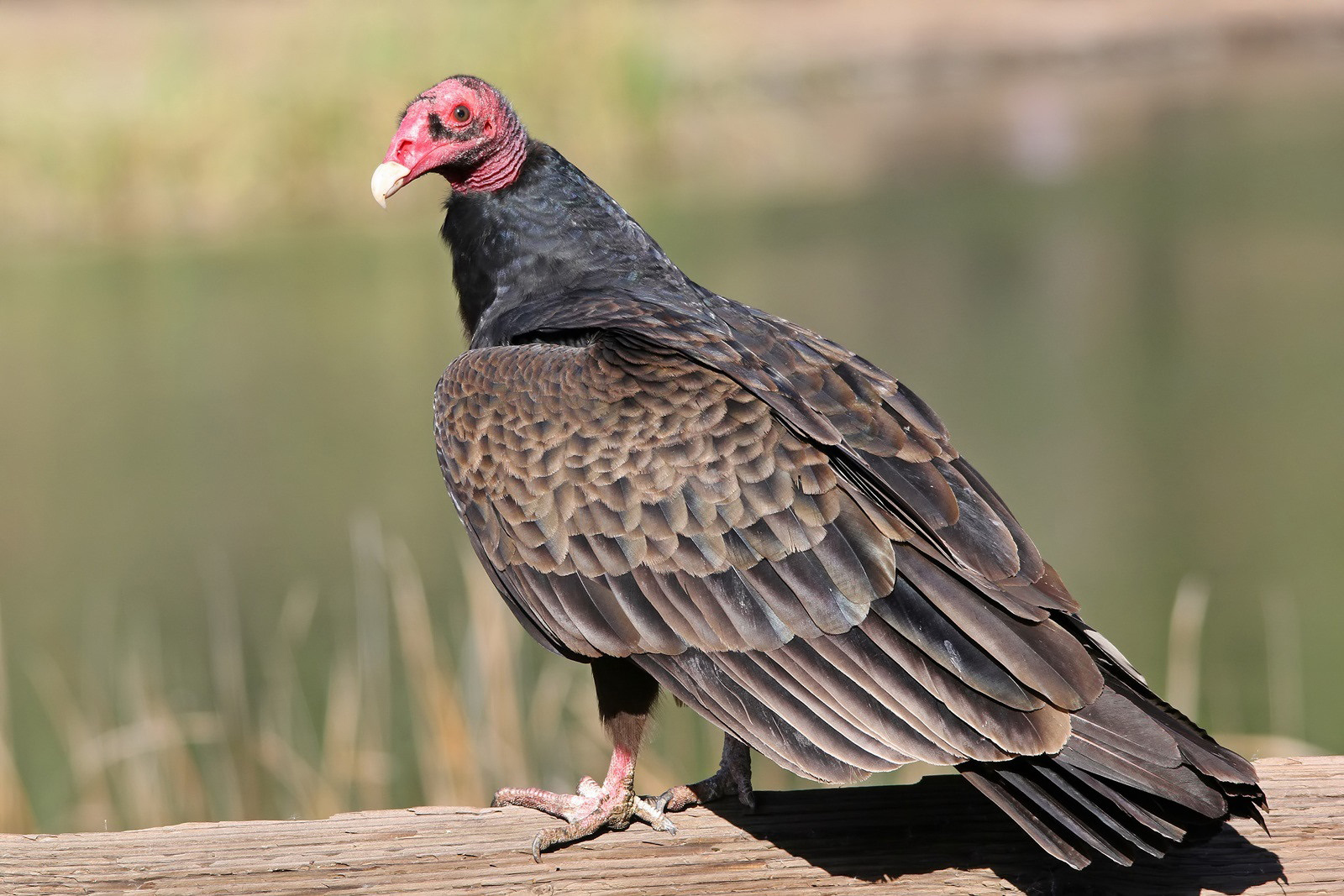
Cathartes aura

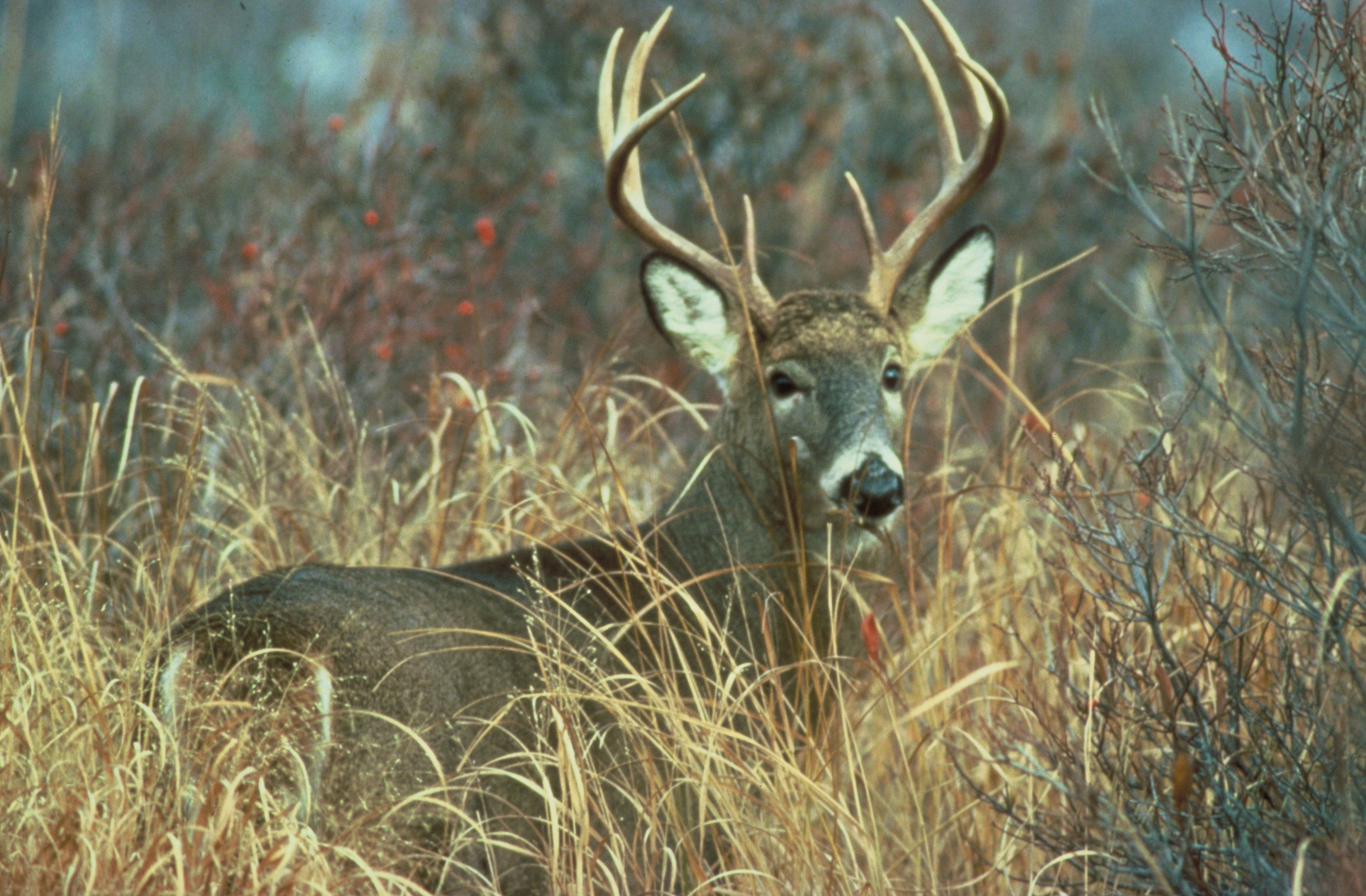
Odocoileus virginianus

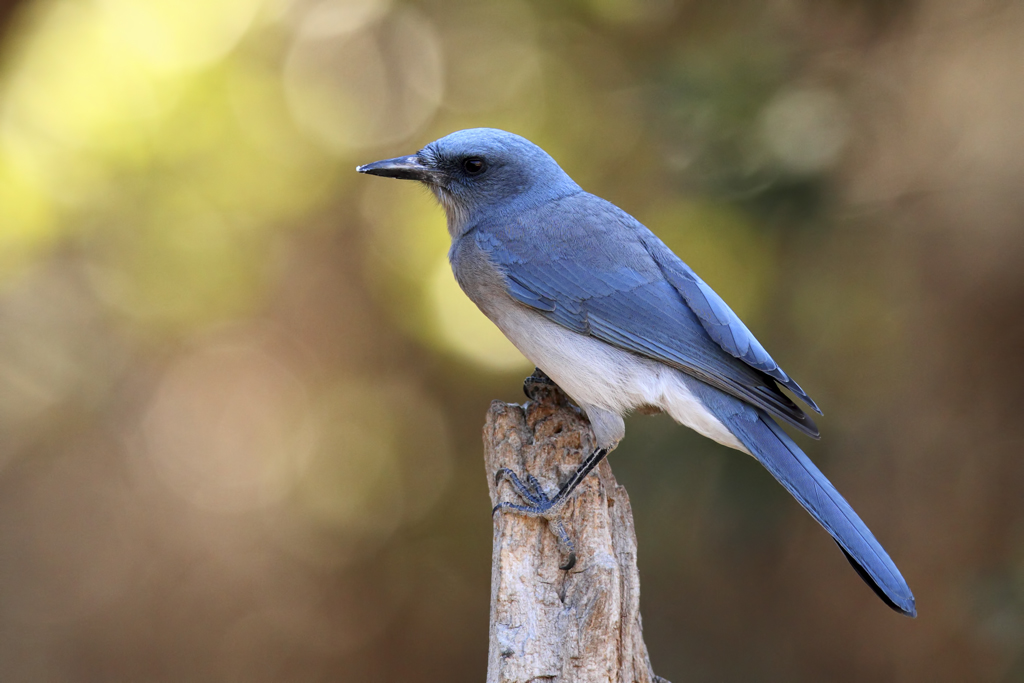
Aphelocoma wollweberi

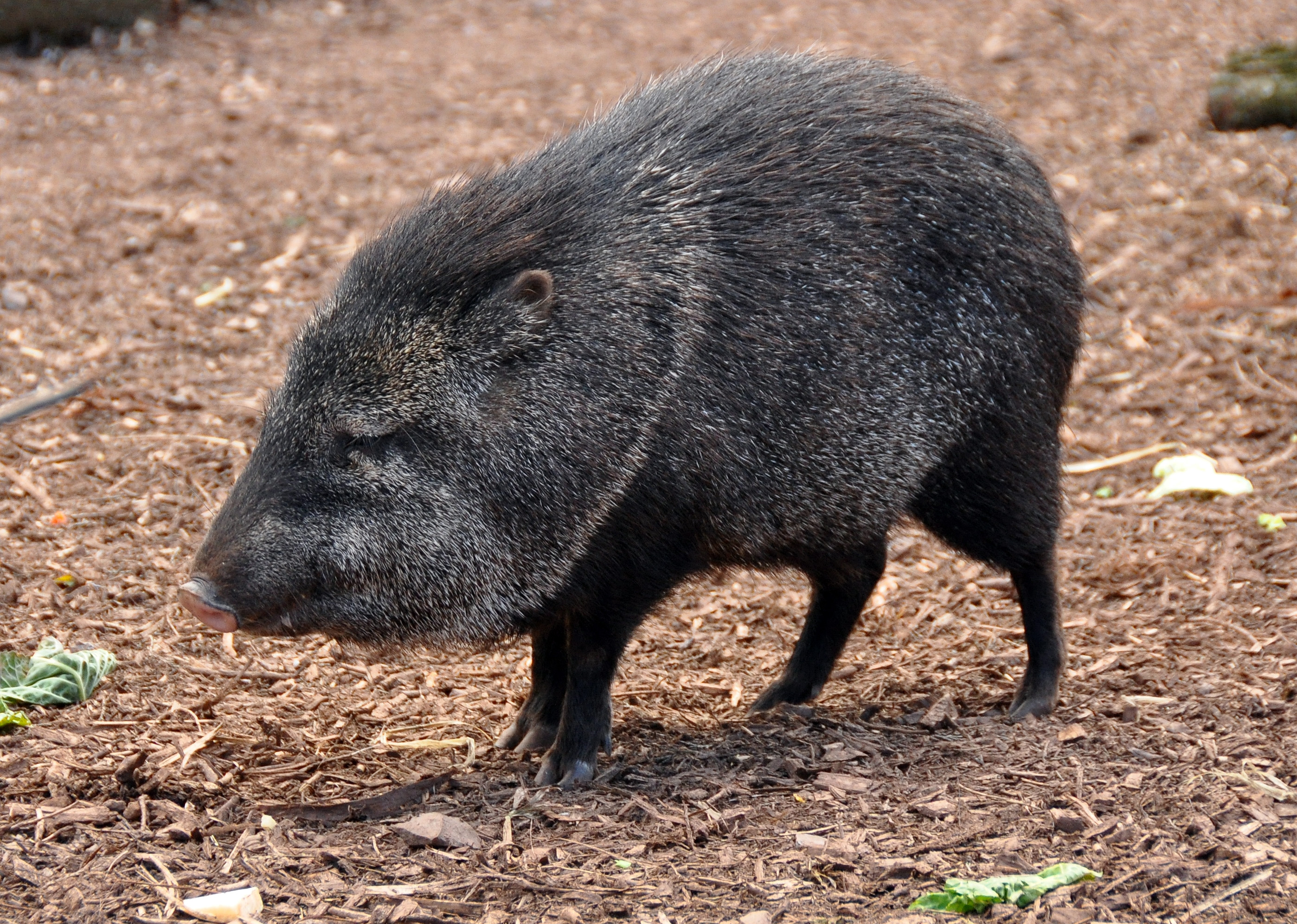
Dicotyles tajacu

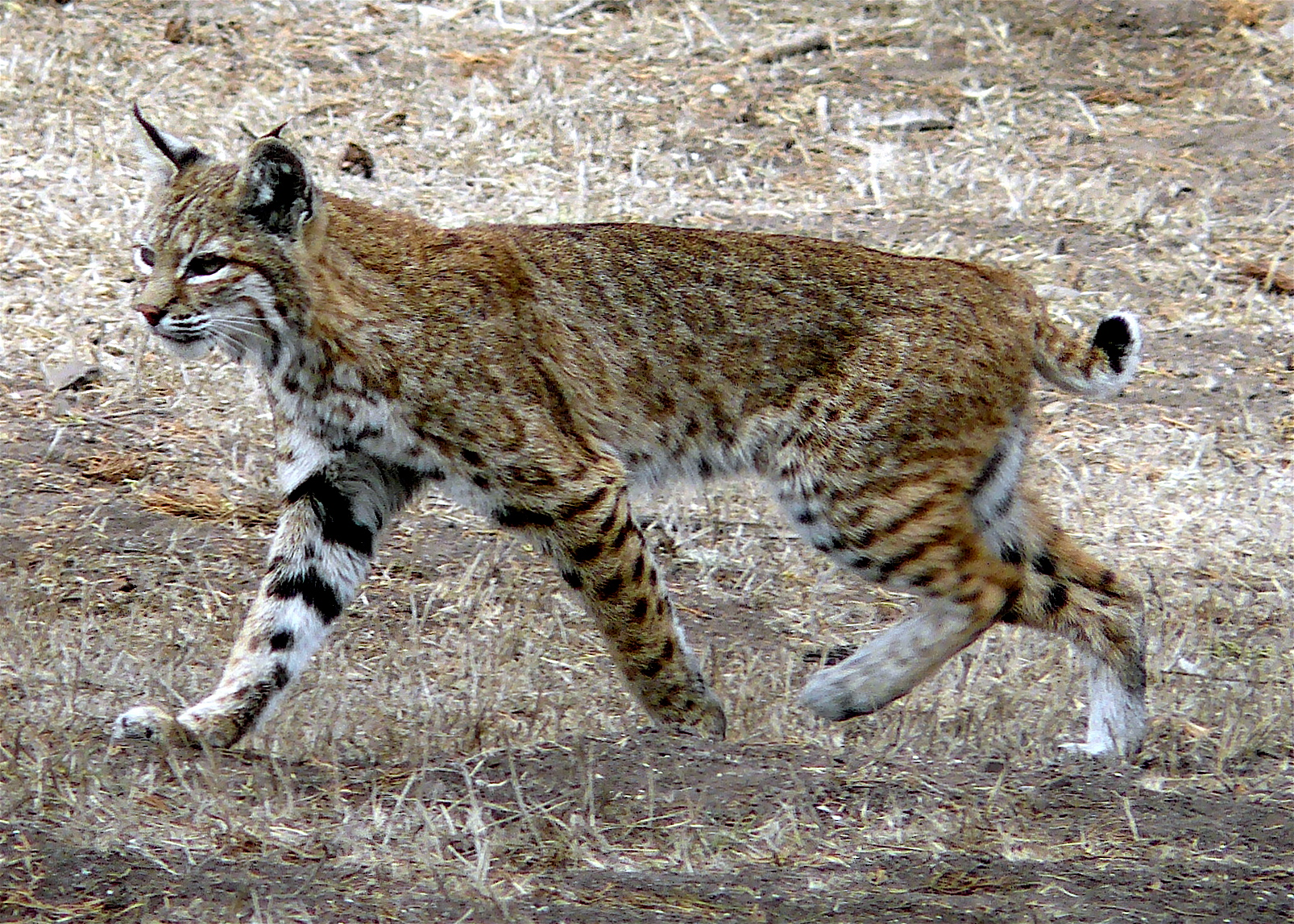
Lynx rufus

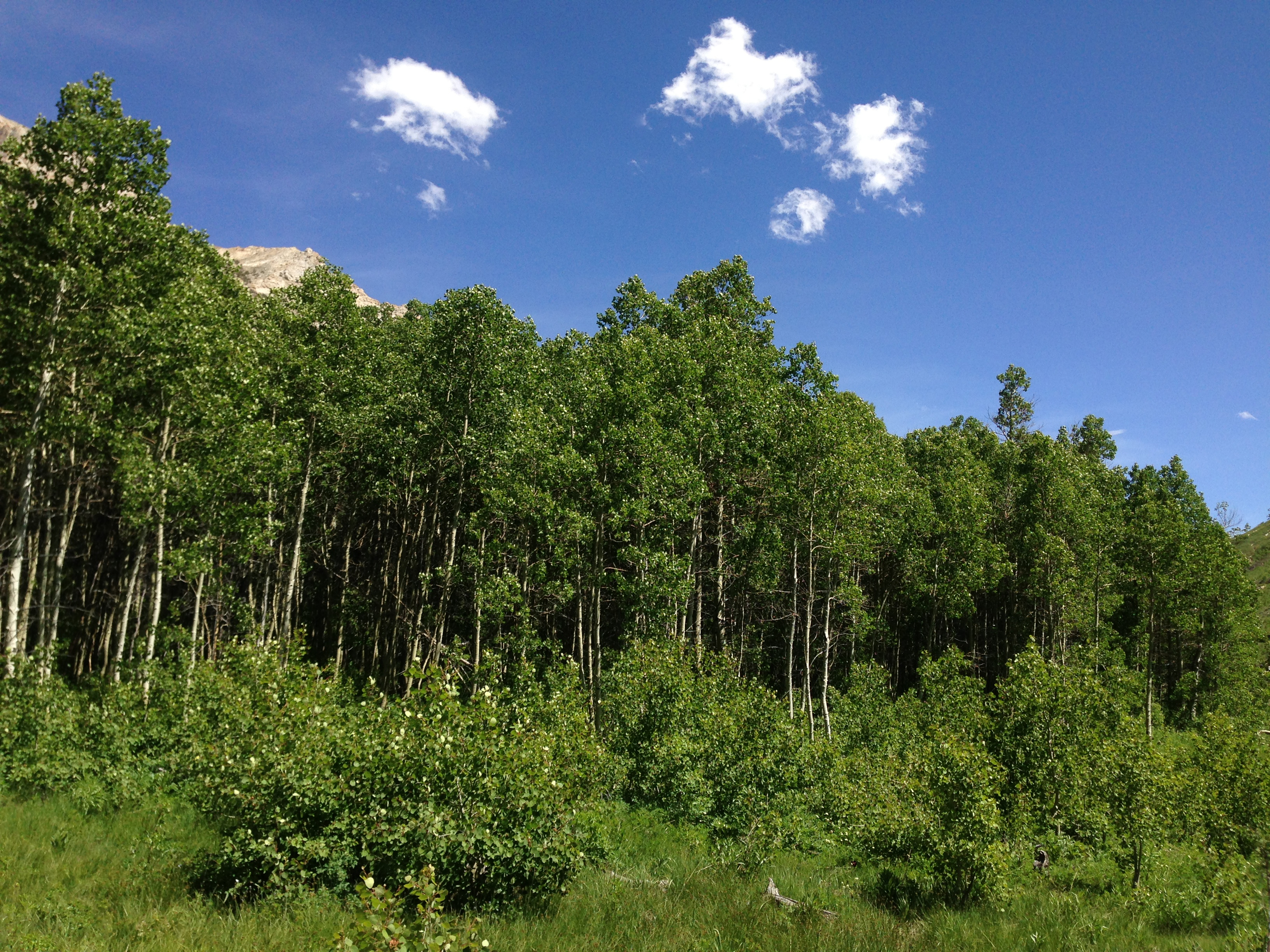
Populus tremuloides

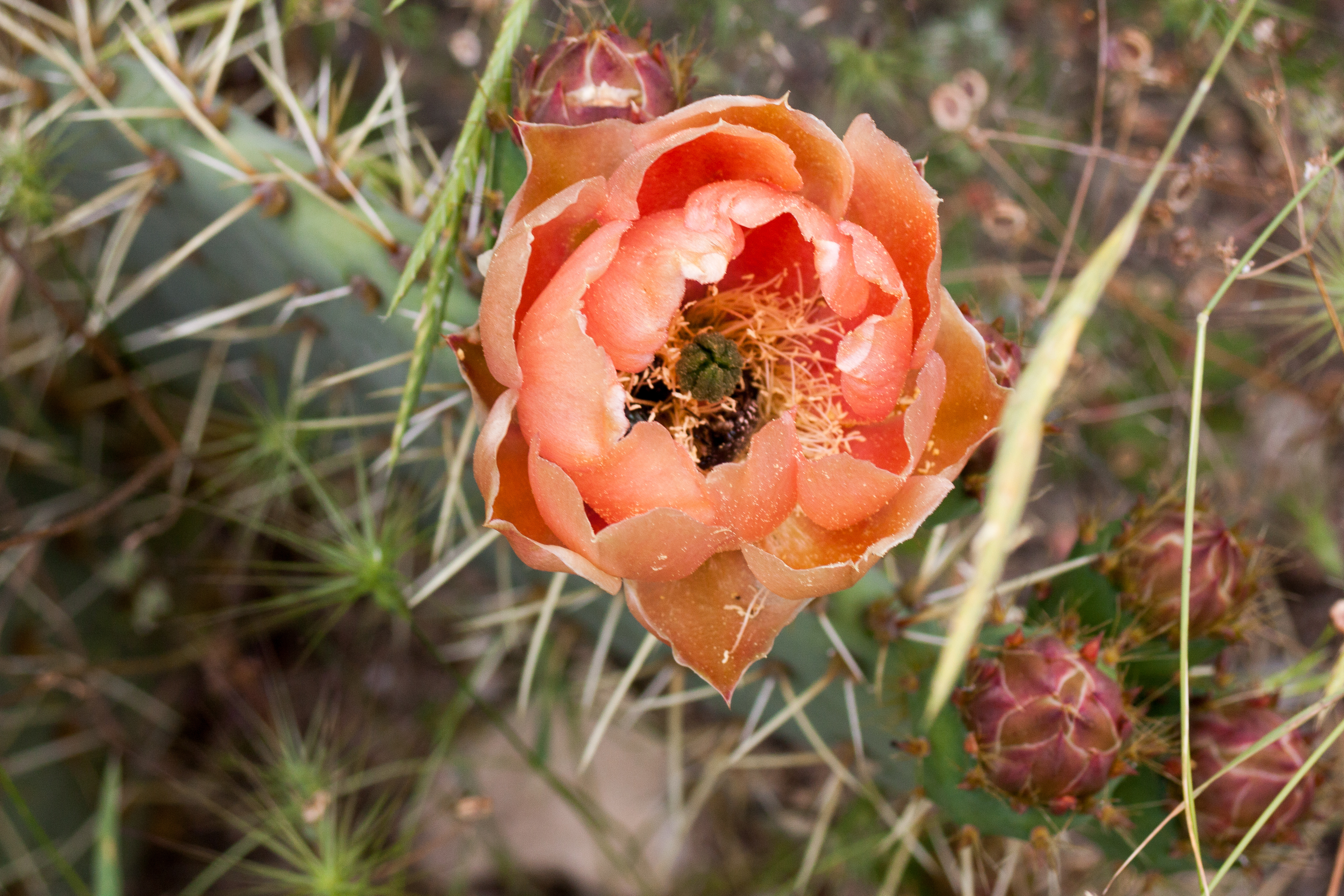
Opuntia ficus-indica

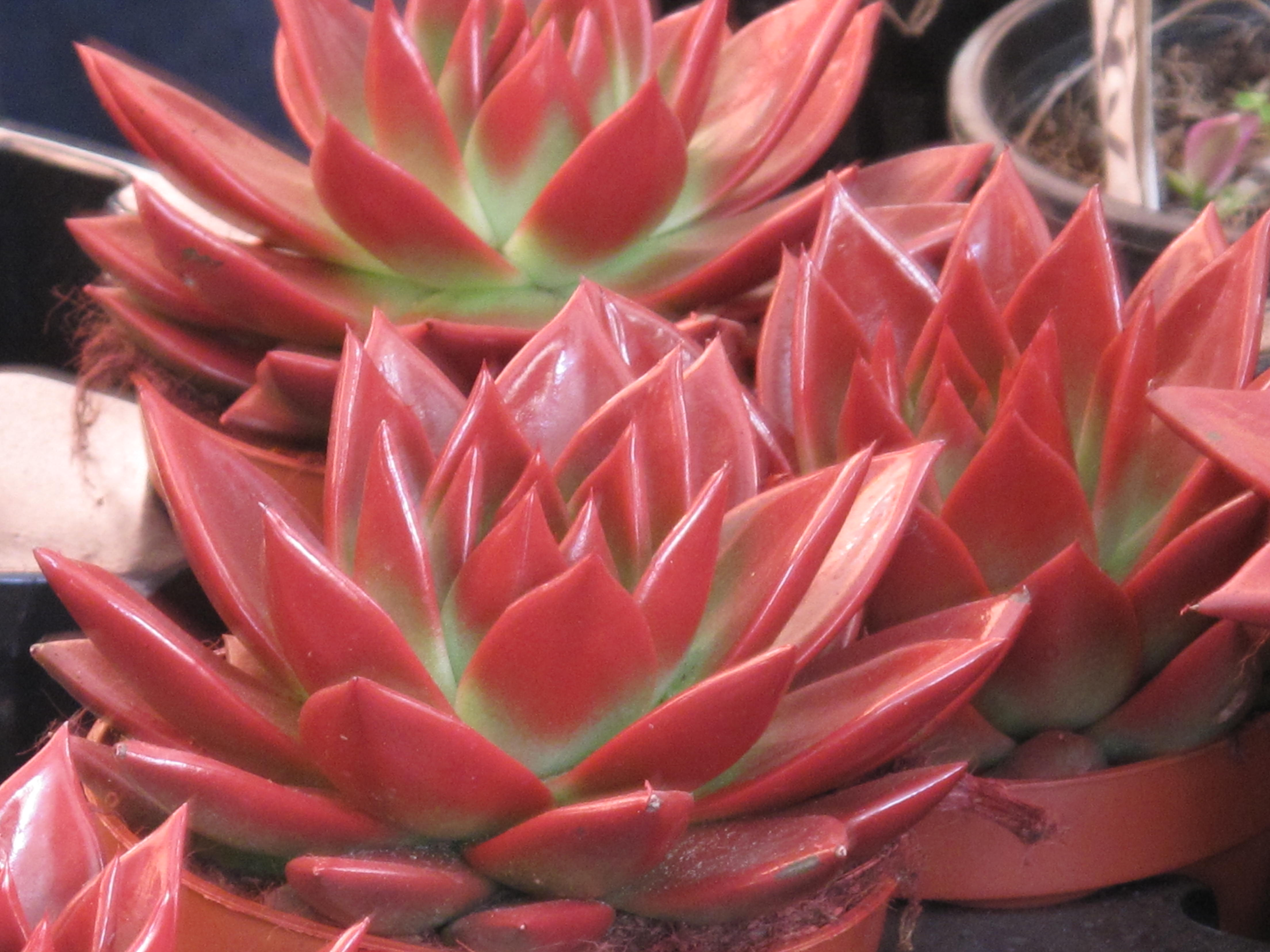
Echeveria agavoides

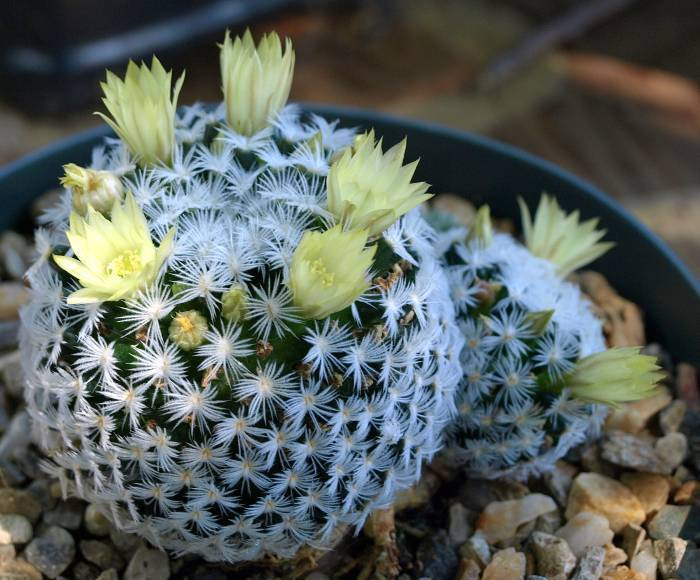
Mammillaria duwei

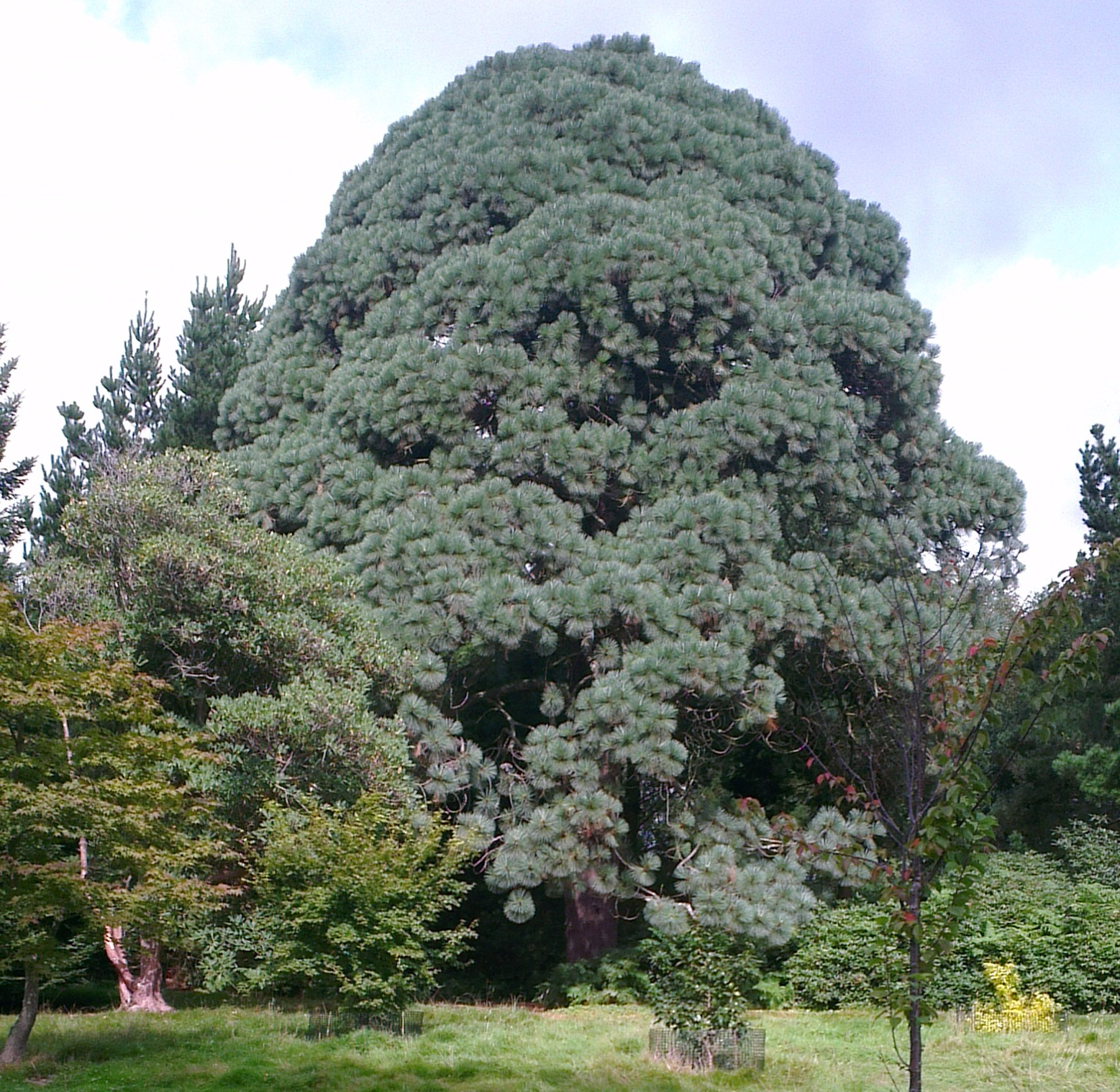
Pinus montezumae

== History ==
=== Pre-Hispanic era ===
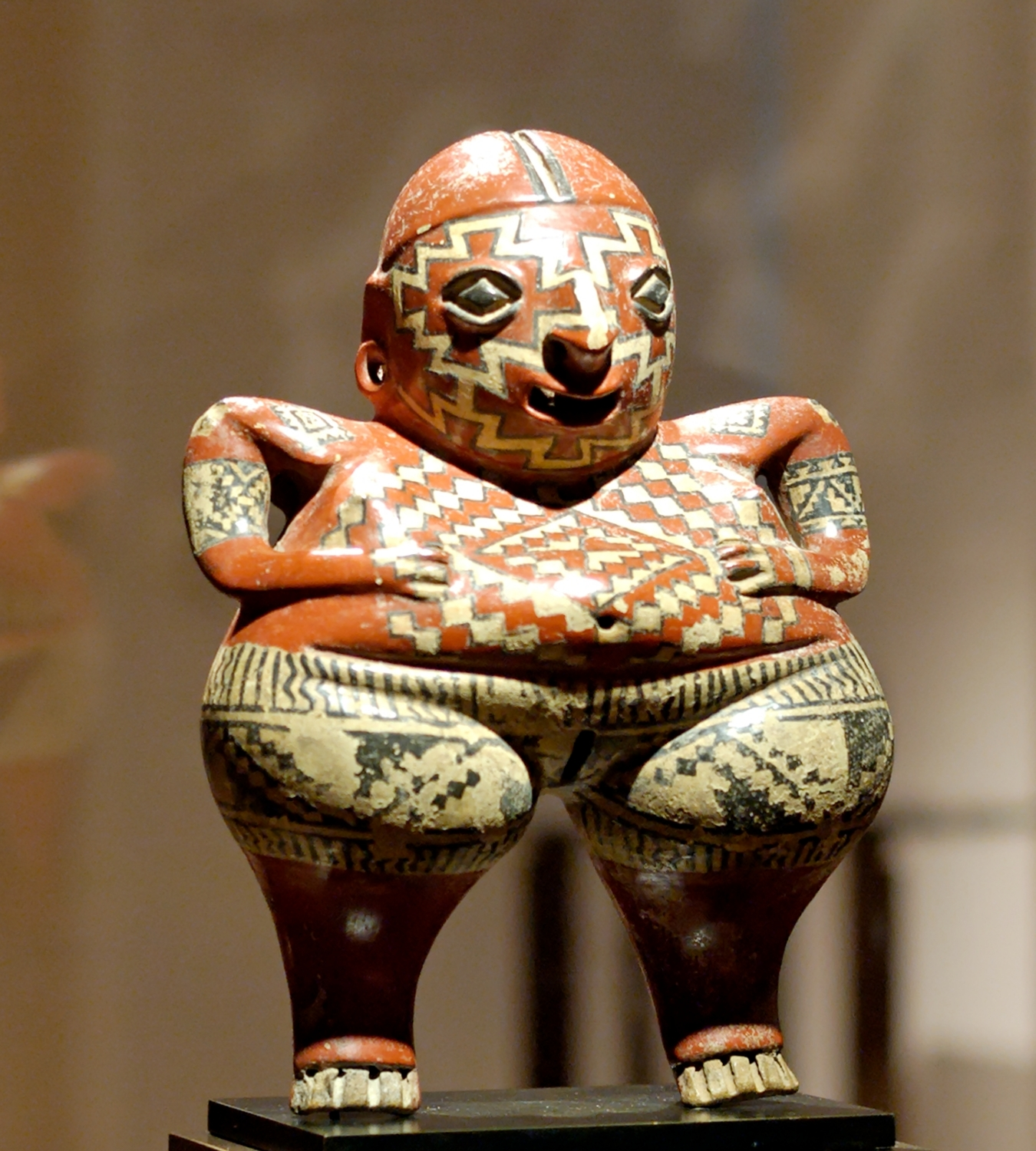
Chupícuaro statuette at the Louvre

In the pre-Hispanic era, the Bajio saw the most human development due to the fertility of the soil and the presence of surface water for agriculture. The oldest group to inhabit the area were the people now known as the Chupícuarios, who dominated the center of the Bajío area and were active between 800 BCE and 300 CE. Their largest city is now the site called Chupícuaro, and their influence was widespread being found in the modern states of Zacatecas, Querétaro, Colima, Nayarit, Hidalgo, State of Mexico, Michoacán and Guerrero. Chupícuaro cities were associated with the Toltec city of Tula and when this city fell, these agricultural cities of Guanajuato also went into decline. This and a prolonged drought cause these cities to be abandoned between the 10th and 11th centuries with only the Guamares left ethnically.

Then Chichimeca and other nomadic groups entered the area. These nomadic Indigenous groups are generically referred to as Chichimeca, but in reality they were a variety of ethnicities such as the Guachichiles, Chichimeca Jonaz and Guamares. These groups were warlike, semi nomadic and did not practice significant agriculture, nor did they construct cities. Part of the state was also inhabited by the Otomi but they were mostly displaced or dominated by the Purépecha in the southwest and the Chichimeca in other parts. By the 16th century, most of Mesoamerica was dominated by either the Aztec Empire or Purépecha Empire, but Guanajuato was under the control of neither. It was on the northern border of the Purépecha Empire with southern Guanajuato showing significant cultural influence in the southern valleys, and Aztecs had ventured into the area looking for minerals. However, most of the state was dominated by various Chichimeca tribes as part of what the Spanish would call the "Gran Chichimeca". These Chichimeca were mostly nomadic with some scattered agricultural communities, mostly in the north.

=== Spanish colonial period ===
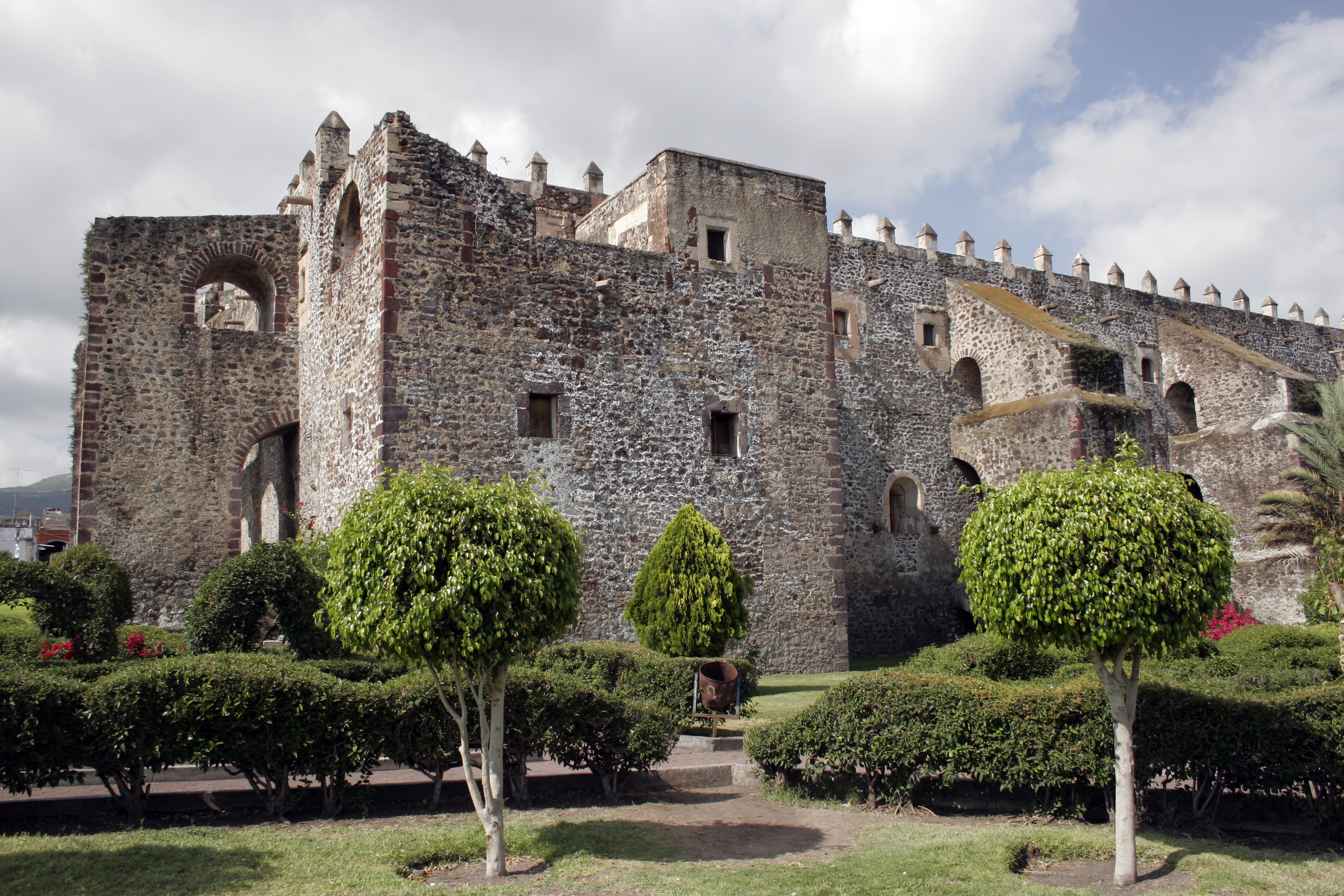
San Agustín de Yuriria Convent, founded by the Augustinians in 1550

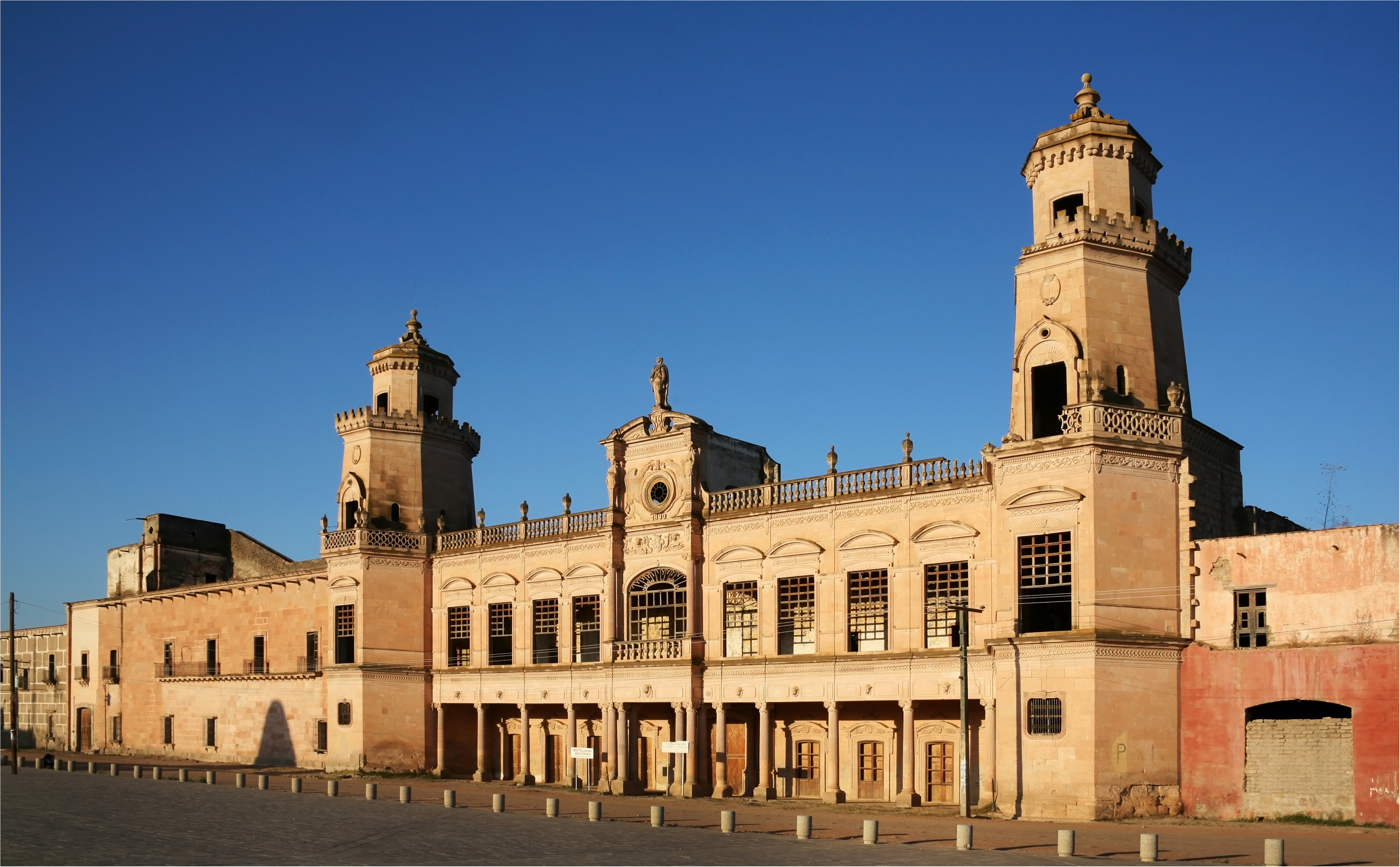
Jaral de Berrios, one of the most important haciendas of the colonial era

As the area of Guanajuato lies on the boundary of the arid north of Mexico, at first relatively few Spanish came to settle - as opposed to points south, which had much more abundant rainfall and Indigenous labor. The first Spanish expedition to visit the Guanajuato area, led by Cristóbal de Olid in 1522, arrived in the Yuririhapúndaro and Pénjamo areas. The discovery of silver and gold in the area of the city of Guanajuato spurred Spanish settlement of the area in the 1520s and 1530s. Following the Spanish arrival, native tribes retreated to the most inaccessible areas of the Bajío and to the mountain ranges in the state, resisting the invaders, attacking settlements and travelers along the routes that connected Spanish settlements and mining camps. The Spanish were unable to force the natives of this area (unlike the more settled Indigenous peoples) to work, and brought African slaves and Indigenous peoples from other areas to work the haciendas and mines. The colonization efforts in the eastern part of the state began in 1542 when Spanish land-grants were issued for the Apaseo and Chamácuaro areas. In 1555 San Miguel el Grande was founded to protect roads linking mining camps and cities with Mexico City to the south-east. The Villa de León was founded in 1576 to counter attacks by the Indigenous peoples. But through the first centuries of the colonial period, the city of Guanajuato dominated because of its mines. The official name of the state is Guanajuato, Estado Libre y Soberano (Guanajuato, Free and Sovereign State). "Guanajuato" comes from Purépecha Quanaxhuato, which has been translated as both "place of frogs" and "places of many hills". The coat of arms of the state is that of the city of Guanajuato, as granted by Carlos I of Spain (r. 1516–1556).

In 1590 the Villa de San Luis de la Paz was founded and named after the peace (paz) treaty between the Spanish and the Chichimeca. With the Spanish occupying most of the most productive land and its resources, the Indigenous of the area became extremely impoverished. This eventually allowed the Spanish to negotiate peace with chiefs in exchange for basic goods such as blankets, clothes and food. This would bring temporary truces. Evangelization efforts would bring longer-term submission. Franciscans and Augustinians worked to gradually modify the worldview of the Chichimecas and others until many moved out of the mountains and into other settlements and professed, at least nominally, the Catholic faith. However, the Indigenous remained extremely marginalized and poor, losing both their language and their culture until most eventually intermarried with outsiders to produce mestizos. Through the Spanish colonial period, most of the area's wealth came from mining, with much of the agriculture springing up to support the mining communities. The height of mining came in the 18th century, mostly from the mines in the hills around the city of Guanajuato, leading to the construction of a large number of notable civil and religious buildings in the same area. The extremely fertile Bajío area became a major agricultural area for New Spain. Both mining and agriculture brought in more Spanish and Criollos to take advantage, as well as mestizos and some African slaves to work the mines and fields, making the area's population grow rapidly and eventually concentrate in urban centers. The area became an intendancy (Spanish: intendencia) or province in 1786, when the authorities divided New Spain into twelve parts.

=== Independence and 19th century ===
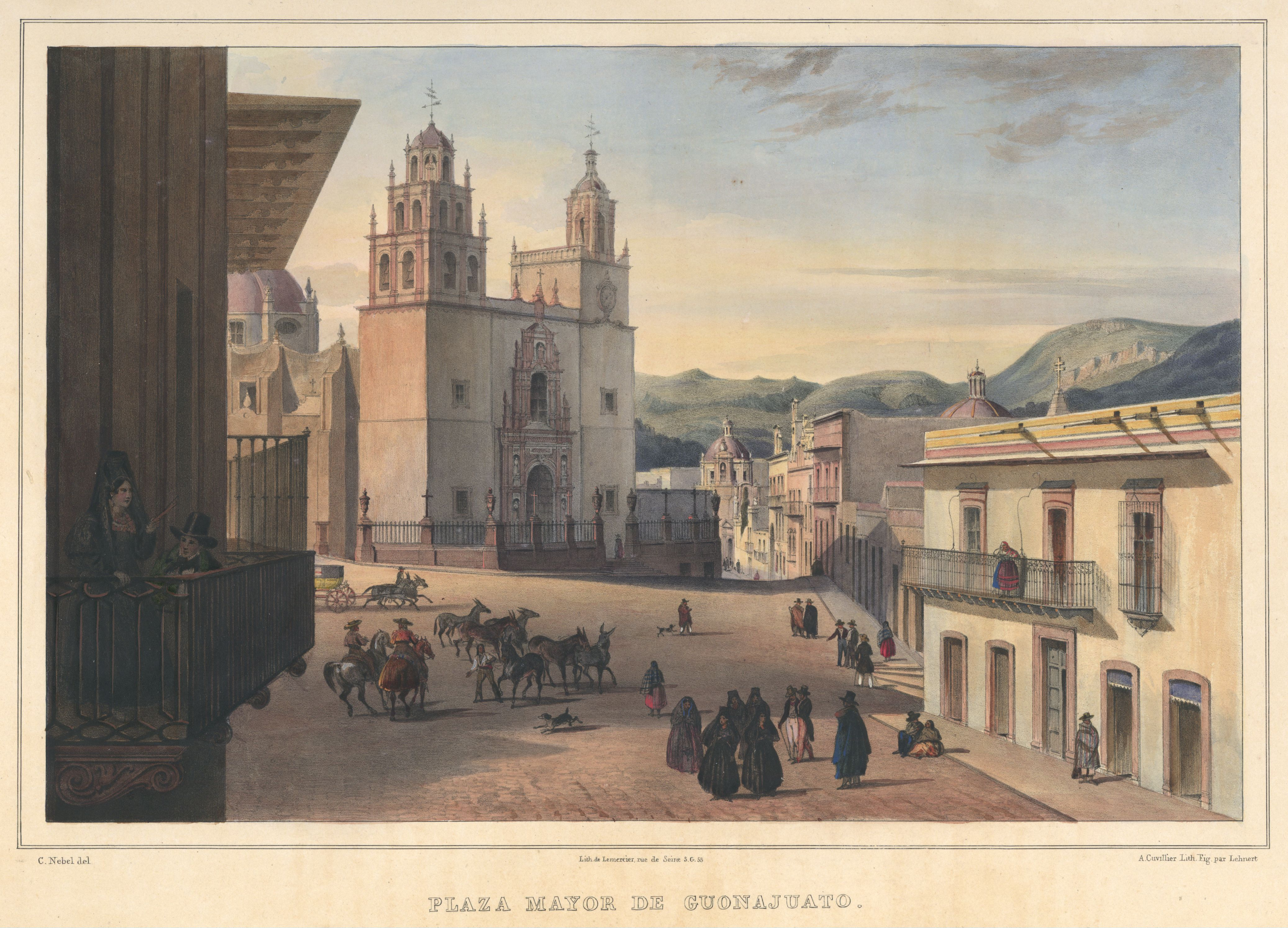
Plaza Mayor de Guanajuato, view of the main square of Guanajuato, c. 1836, Carl Nebel

Despite the riches the area produced, most lived in oppression and poverty at the end of the 18th century, working on haciendas and in mines while a few, mostly European-born Spaniards, lived in opulence. Not only the Indigenous, mestizo and Negro slaves were having problems with the social order. Many Criollos or New World-born Spanish were marginalized by the Spain-born. One of the first rebellions against colonial rule came in 1766, when a group attacked the Caja Real in Guanajuato city to protest high taxes. In 1767, there were protests against the expulsion of the Jesuits by the Spanish Crown. These were put down with extreme force, but they spurred conspiracies, and groups organizing against colonial rule, especially in San Miguel el Grande and León.

Numerous plans were made, but few were carried out or had impact until 1809. In that year, a group consisting of Miguel Hidalgo y Costilla, Ignacio Allende, Juan Aldama, Miguel Domínguez and more, began to plan an armed revolt against the colonial government. In 1810, the plot was discovered and Hidalgo decided to put their plans into action in September instead of the planned date in December. On 15 September, Miguel Hidalgo y Costilla declared the Grito de Dolores in the town of Dolores (Hidalgo). Hidalgo, accompanied by Ignacio Allende, left Dolores with about 800 men, half of whom were on horseback. Through sheer numbers, Hidalgo's army had some early victories, progressing through the economically important and densely populated province of Guanajuato. One of Hidalgo's first stops was at the Sanctuary of Atotonilco. There, Hidalgo affixed an image of the Virgin to a lance to adopt it as his banner. He then inscribed the following slogans on his troops' flags: "Long live religion! Long live our most Holy Mother of Guadalupe! Long live Ferdinand VII! Long live America and death to bad government!" The extent and the intensity of the movement took viceregal authorities by surprise. San Miguel and Celaya were captured with little resistance. On 21 September 1810, Hidalgo was proclaimed general and supreme commander after arriving at Celaya. At this point, Hidalgo's army numbered about 50,000. However, due to lack of military discipline, the insurgents soon fell into robbing, looting and ransacking the towns they were capturing. On 28 September 1810, Hidalgo arrived at the city of Guanajuato. The town's Spanish and Criollo populations took refuge in the heavily fortified Alhóndiga de Granaditas granary defended by Quartermaster Riaños. Hidalgo's army overwhelmed the defenses in two days and killed an estimated 400–600 men, women and children. Fighting associated with the War of Independence would return near the end of the conflict. Military commanders Luis de Cortázar and Anastasio Bustamante joined forces with Agustín de Iturbide and took the city of Guanajuato on 8 July 1821, declaring the entire state independent of Spanish rule. In 1824, Guanajuato was officially proclaimed a state of Mexico by the Constitutional Congress of Mexico.

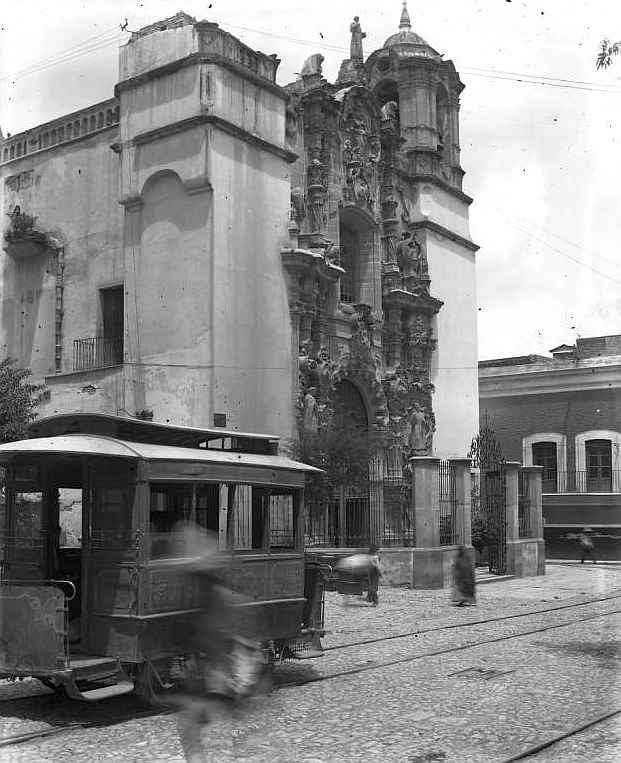
Trolley passing in front of the San Diego Church in Guanajuato, 1907

The years after the end of the War of Independence were extremely unstable, and would continue to be unstable through most of the rest of the 19th century. The towns of Dolores and San Miguel adopted the names of Dolores Hidalgo and San Miguel de Allende in honor of those who began the independence movement and in 1826, the first constitution of the state of Guanajuato was adopted. Like much of the rest of the country, Guanajuato was affected by the prolonged fighting between Liberal and Conservative factions as well as the foreign incursions that dominated the 19th century. Guanajuato's status vacillated between state (when Liberals were in charge) and department (when Conservatives held the upper hand). Under Liberal ideals, educational institutions such as the Colegio de la Santisima Trinidad and the Colegio de la Purisima Concepción were secularized and under control of the State. In 1847, General Gabriel Valencia raised an army of 6,000 men to fight the U.S. invasion of Mexico. In 1848, in opposition to the Treaty of Guadalupe Hidalgo, General Marian Paredes, General Manuel Doblado and priest Celedonio Dómeco de Jarauta revolted, taking the state capital, but they were defeated and Doméco was executed by firing squad. In 1855, Conservative Manuel Doblado, then the governor of Guanajuato, forced Juan Álvarez out of the presidency after he took power from Antonio López de Santa Anna. In 1858, the government under President Benito Juárez moved from Mexico City to the city of Guanajuato before moving again to Manzanillo and then Veracruz during the Reform War. During this three-year period, the state would vacillate various times between the Liberals and Conservatives. In 1863, it was taken over by the French as they installed Maximilian I as emperor of Mexico. Maximillian did not reign long but the governor he appointed for Guanajuato, Florencio Antillón remained in Guanajuato until 1877.

=== Mexican Revolution to the present ===
The situation stabilized over much of the government of Porfirio Díaz at the end of the 19th century and the economy improved, but the Diaz government was oppressive. Diaz installed Francisco Mena as governor of the state, who made a fortune through the concession of railway lines which were being built to modernize the country. Even though slavery was officially abolished during the War of Independence, most laborers in farms and mines were extremely underpaid and in a number of cases not paid at all. Agricultural production reached a peak at the end of the 19th century, earning the state the nickname of the "granary of the Republic". Industrialization took hold in cities such as León, Salvatierra, Celaya and San Francisco del Rincón, making shoes, textiles and hats. One battle of the Mexican Revolution occurred in Celaya in 1915 between the troops of Álvaro Obregón and Francisco Villa. Many from the state fought and died in other parts of Mexico, leaving behind widows and children. After the war, the large landholdings were broken up and land redistributed into ejidos, or commonly held land, which benefitted many rural families.

After the end of the Mexican Revolution, fighting in Mexico continued with the Cristero War. Fighting related to this was most prominent in Pénjamo and León, but occurred in other areas as well. In 1946, an uprising against the government by a group called the Sinarquistas occurred in Leon. However, most of the state was peaceful most of the time, allowing the economy to recover. This was especially true of the agricultural sector, producing wheat, corn, sorghum, alfalfa, strawberries in Irapuato and goats in various parts. Goat milk cajeta candy from Celaya is known in most of Mexico. The first Festival Internacional Cervantino occurred in 1972. In the 1980s, two of the state's cities, Guanajuato and San Miguel de Allende were declared World Heritage Sites.

Today, the Bajio is one of the major grain producing regions in Mexico. The Guanajuato congress has asked for help against the theft of religious art in the state, which has the third highest incidence of such. One of the major occurrences was the theft of the gold crown of the Black Christ of Salamanca in 2010. The celebration of Mexico's Bicentennial was particularly important to the state as initial events of the War in Independence occurred here. The state set up a Bicentennial Route to encourage visitors to the cities associated with Miguel Hidalgo's first campaigns. The state held a marathon from San Miguel Allende to Dolores Hidalgo for the Bicentennial with Omar Luna winning with a time of 2h23m14s. The state sponsored the Expo Bicentenario 2010 from 17 July to 20 November just outside the capital city. The site was marked by a giant Mexican flag flying alongside older historic flags, including a replica of the standard with an image of the Virgin of Guadalupe that Miguel Hidalgo carried as the insurgent banner. The Expo was housed in a series of pavilions which demonstrated the Mexican culture, history, traditions and customs. There were also pavilions hosted by various Latin American countries who also celebrated their Bicentennials around the same time. In 2023, the southern town of Salvatierra experienced a mass shooting at a private Christmas party in which 12 people were left dead and 25 were left injured.

== Demographics ==
Largest cities or towns in Guanajuato Source:
Rank		Municipality	Pop.
1	León de los Aldama	León	1,579,803
2	Irapuato	Irapuato	452,090
3	Celaya	Celaya	378,143
4	Salamanca	Salamanca	160,682
5	Silao	Silao	83,352
6	San Francisco del Rincón	San Francisco del Rincón	79,772
7	Valle de Santiago	Valle de Santiago	72,663
8	San Miguel de Allende	San Miguel de Allende	72,452
9	Guanajuato	Guanajuato	70,068
10	Cortazar	Cortazar	69,371

Religion in Guanajuato (2010)
1. Others (6.00%)
2. Catholicism (94.0%)

Historical population
Year	Pop.	±%
1895	1,069,418	—
1900	1,061,724	−0.7%
1910	1,081,651	+1.9%
1921	860,364	−20.5%
1930	987,801	+14.8%
1940	1,046,490	+5.9%
1950	1,328,712	+27.0%
1960	1,735,490	+30.6%
1970	2,270,370	+30.8%
1980	3,006,110	+32.4%
1990	3,982,593	+32.5%
1995	4,406,568	+10.6%
2000	4,663,032	+5.8%
2005	4,893,812	+4.9%
2010	5,486,372	+12.1%
2015	5,853,677	+6.7%
2020	6,166,934	+5.4%

As of 2005, the state had a population of 4,893,812, which is the sixth largest population in Mexico. About 67% live in urban areas, with the rest in rural areas, and women slightly outnumbering men. The largest population centers are León with 1,134,842 people, Irapuato with 440,134, Celaya with 382,958, and Salamanca with 226,654.

=== Religion ===
Over 94% of the population professes the Catholic religion, and the state is considered to be very conservative and adherent to Catholic principles both socially and politically.

=== Indigenous peoples ===
Guanajuato has the fourth lowest number of people who can speak an Indigenous language. However, the ethnically Indigenous population is about 10,347 (2005) or 2.6% of the population over the age of five. The languages spoken are Chichimeca Jonaz, Otomi and Nahuatl. The two most important Indigenous groups are the Chichimeca Jonaz and the Otomi, both of which are concentrated in the Valles de Sur area. Culturally, both groups show significant Purépecha influence. Both live in arid regions, where rainfall is precious and the diet includes foods such as pitayas, Myrtillocactus geometrizans (garambullo), cactus pear, nopal and agave. Hunting was an important source of protein but the scarcity of game has all but extinguished this practice. Subsistence agriculture forms the basis of the economy and provides much of the current diet. However, these peoples are extremely poor, and many migrate to other places to find work. In what is now the state of Guanajuato, there were a number Nahua) groups who built cities in the first millennium CE. but then abandoned them long before the arrival of the Spanish. It is believed that the Chichimeca came to dominate the area after the fall of these cities, and the Chichimeca Jonaz believe that the eagle, which is sacred to them, led them here. At the time of the Spanish conquest, the only Chichimeca group left were the Chichimeca Jonaz, who were semi-nomadic and warlike. These qualities allowed these Chichimecas to resist Spanish domination for many years. However, the deterioration of the environment by the Spanish depleted resources for these people and finally made them submit.

The Chichimeca Jonaz refer to themselves and other Indigenous as "uza" (singular) or "ézar" (plural), which roughly translates to "Indian". Their language is Oto-Pamean and related to their neighbors, the Otomi. Most Chichimecas are found in the municipality of San Luis de la Paz, in the community of Rancho Uza or Mision Chichimeca. This community subdivides into the Mision de Abajo in the east and Mision de Arriba in the west. This area borders lands of the Huasteca and Pame groups, and there have been conflicts among the three. The Chichimeca Jonaz have a mixed Catholic-Indigenous belief system. While outwardly Catholic, many rituals still follow the cycles found in nature, such as planting and harvesting and lunar cycles. The most important "spirit guides" are the eagle and water, with the Virgin of Guadalupe playing an important role as Universal Mother. One important saint is Isidore the Laborer, who is connected to the bringing of rain.

The Otomis of the state are concentrated in the community of Cieneguilla in the municipality of Tierra Blanca. In pre-Hispanic times, these people were semi-nomadic, desert dwellers. During the Conquest, these and other Otomi groups allied themselves with the Spanish, in part because the Aztecs and others considered the Otomi to be backwards and barbaric. The Otomi also speak an Oto-Pamean language and are related to other Otomi groups scattered around the central and southern areas of Mexico. Today, however, most children are not learning the language from their parents, putting it in danger of extinction in spite of efforts to introduce bilingual education.

=== Immigration ===
Concentrating in San Miguel de Allende, foreign residents from the United States and Canada came, in the early 2000s, because of the area's mild climate, cultural opportunities, and low crime rate. While accounting for only about ten percent of San Miguel's total population, they had a large impact on the area economically, accounting for most home buyers. Estimates of foreign residents range from 8,000 to 12,000 with about 7,000 of these from the United States alone. This makes San Miguel one of the largest American communities in Mexico, large enough to warrant its own U.S. consulate to provide services such as notary and passport. Since that time, Guanajuato has had a significant rise in violent crime, the second highest homicide rate in the nation, with Mexican President López Obrador calling out the state's attorney general for inaction on the matter. Guanajuato is the most violent state of Mexico, with 10.5% (3,151) of murders nationwide in 2024.

There is a growing presence of East Asians, primarily Japanese, in the Bajio region. As of early 2014, there were more than three thousand Japanese immigrants in the Bajio area, and it's claimed that this population is larger than the historical Japanese community in Mexico City. The Guanajuato government believes that by 2016 there will be five thousand families installed in the region. This immigration is being driven by foreign investment in the Bajio, especially in the automotive sector. The large Japanese community prompted the opening of a Japanese consulate in Leon. There is also a Korean community in the area that is likewise growing as a result of foreign investment.

== Economy ==
Being located in the center of the country has important economic implications for the state, as a number of major national highways and railways pass through. The state is also a center of industry with most of the state's major cities and economy located in the La Sierra Central and El Bajío regions. It has equal access to both the Pacific Ocean and Gulf of Mexico as well as the major metropolitan areas of Monterrey, Mexico City and Guadalajara. In 2008, the total GDP for the state was US$38,204,000,000 (427,503,000,000 MXN) or 3.88% of the total for the country. From 2003 to 2008, the economy grew 1.06% (adjusted for inflation). The state has the sixth-largest economy in Mexico behind Mexico City, the State of Mexico, Nuevo León, Jalisco, and Veracruz. As of 2008, Guanajuato ranks fourth in per capita income at US$7,609, behind Mexico City, Nuevo León and Jalisco, with a rate of increase of 2.04%. Manufacturing accounts for 28% of total GDP, down slightly from a high of over 30%. Its importance is followed by commerce at 16.3% and real estate at 11.2%. Agriculture, which includes forestry, fishing and hunting accounts for 4.6. Other activities include financial and other professional services (17.6%) and transportation and storage at 11.8%. Employment figures break down differently with 13.2% employed in agriculture, 36.4% in mining and industry and 47.3 percent in commerce, services and tourism. There are two significant migration patterns in the state. Twenty-seven of 46 municipalities have a high level of migration out to other areas, with 19 having a moderate to low level of the same. The annual rate of migration to the United States is 7.07 people per thousand.

=== Industry, crafts and mining ===
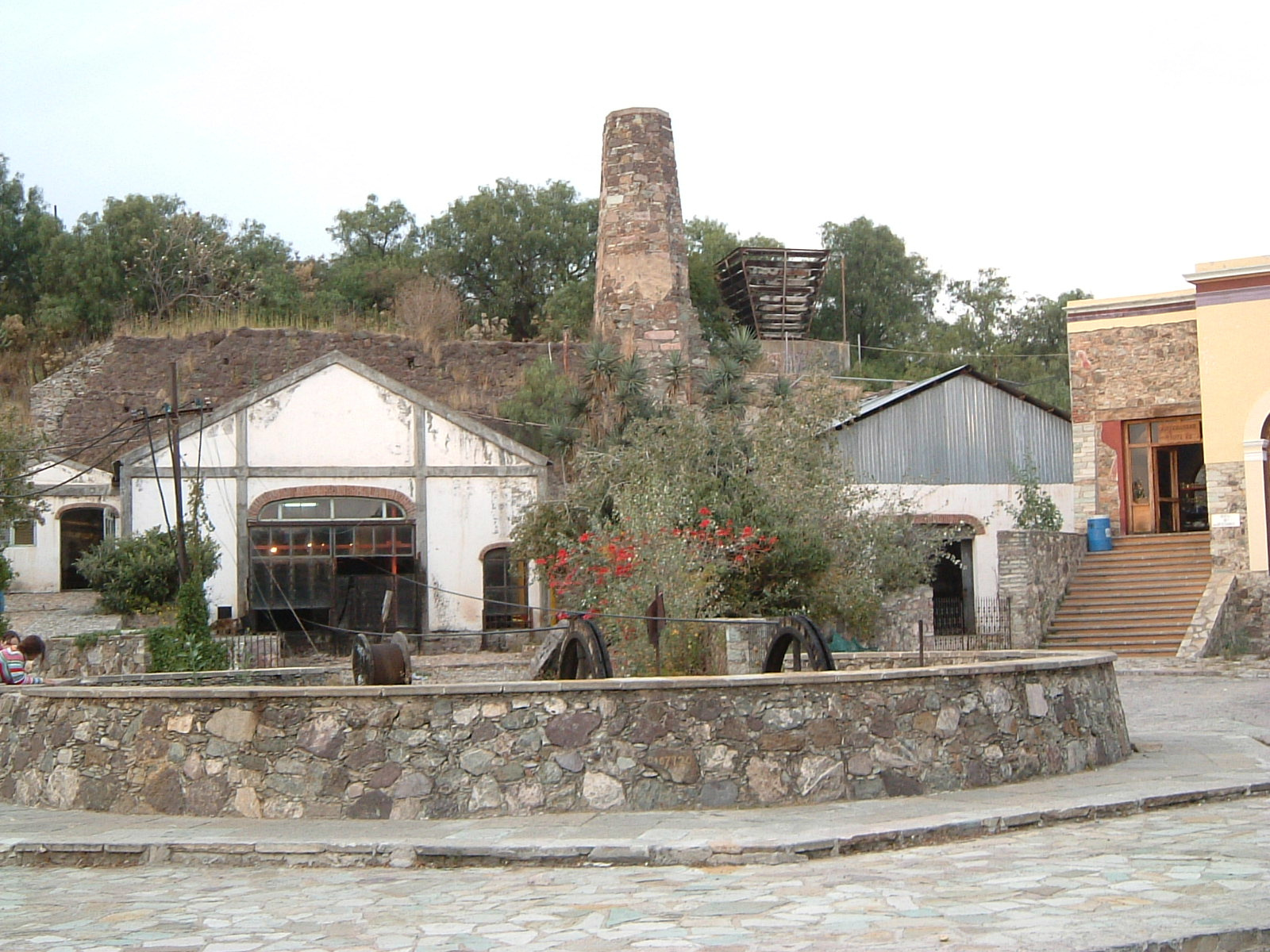
Rayas mine near the city of Guanajuato

Industry is the most important segment in the modern state economy, accounting for about 30%. Most of this is the production of automobiles and automobile parts, pharmaceuticals and other modern items. It also includes more traditional items such as processed foods (cheese, canned items and more) as well as shoes and other leather goods in León and a variety of crafts. The economy in this area continues to grow although there has been some drop in its percentage of GDP due to drop in prices for a number of manufactured products. The state has two large thermoelectrical plants in Salamanca and Celaya. Oil refining in Salamanca received raw material through pipelines from Poza Rica, Veracruz and from Tabasco.

One traditional industry is the making of shoes and other leather items, especially in León. This industry grew 50% from 2009 to 2010 in the number of enterprises dedicated to it. They now total 7,981 and employ 297,413 people directly and indirectly according to INEGI. In 2010, Volkswagen announced a new motor plant to be built in Silao. The project is projected to cost US$550 million and will employ 700 people making 330,000 motors per year starting in 2013. A spokesman for the company acknowledged that part of the reason to build the plant was the existence of a General Motors plant in the same area as well as the existence of the Parque Industrial Puerto Interior which offers access to different transportation modes. The Centro de Innovación (Innovation Center) of Microsoft was inaugurated in 2010 in León. This establishment is meant to support businesses and governments to form software and technology enterprises with the goal of starting fifty new businesses with ten to twenty employees each.

Almost all handcrafts (98%) are made in micro and small enterprises, most of which are family-owned. Almost all them, which mostly consist of glass, wrought iron, ceramic and wooden items, are exported to the United States (91%). However, craft items are under pressure from imitations from Central America and Asia. The crafts sector of industry is not considered a particularly active segment of the state's population with no data as to the percentage of the state's GDP it represents. Most crafts over time have become specialties of more or more municipalities.

Majolica pottery has been made in the state since colonial times after being introduced by the Spanish. Since then, areas have developed specialties in form and decoration, but techniques have not changed much for over 400 years. Most clay is extracted from the Dolores Hidalgo region and most is produced in Dolores Hidalgo, San Miguel de Allende and the city of Guanajuato. Another area noted for its work is Tarandacuaro, which makes high-fire ceramics. The two best-known workshops are Fabrica Javier Servin and Taller Checuan. The ceramics of this area have distinctive, very intricate, mostly geometric designs, which are painted on by hand. The municipality promotes the work through its Centro Turistico de Desarrollo de Tarandacuao.

Acámbaro is noted for its bread. One local bread specialty is the tallado, which has a base of egg and butter and can have fillings such as fig, coconut, raisins and chocolate. This bread is the result of recipes brought by the Franciscans, modified over time by the native Indigenous potters' community.

San Francisco del Rincón has had a tradition of making hats since the 18th century. Traditionally, the hats were made from palm fronds brought from the Michoacán coast area, but today many workshops and factories use synthetic fibers. In traditional workshops, the work is divided by sex, with women weaving the fibers together and men pressing it into shape, putting in the supports and other details. The quality of the hats made here has made them exportable.

In San Luis de la Paz and Coroneo, wool is worked into clothing, especially into coats, gloves, vests, scarves and other items for winter wear. Some of the workshops still work with large old weaving looms. In addition, there are workshops which make rugs, zarapes, and other items for the home. In Coroneo, the craft 100 years ago was practiced only by women. The most common item is still the zarape, which is decorated with figures such as horse heads and deer as well as fretwork on the edges. However, sweaters, capes, rebozos, bags and even wool shoes can also be found for sale. One other specialty is rugs woven on large looms.

Apaseo el Alto is known for its work in fine woods, which began with the workshop of Domingo Garcia sixty years ago. Since then, about 150 workshops have been established in the municipality, employing about 500 craftsmen. Items include sculptures such as religious figures and animals and utilitarian items such as utensils and furniture. Craftsmen first began working with a wood called "patol" and juniper, but today they work with various woods such as walnut, cedar, mahogany and Ceiba pentandra (the kapok).

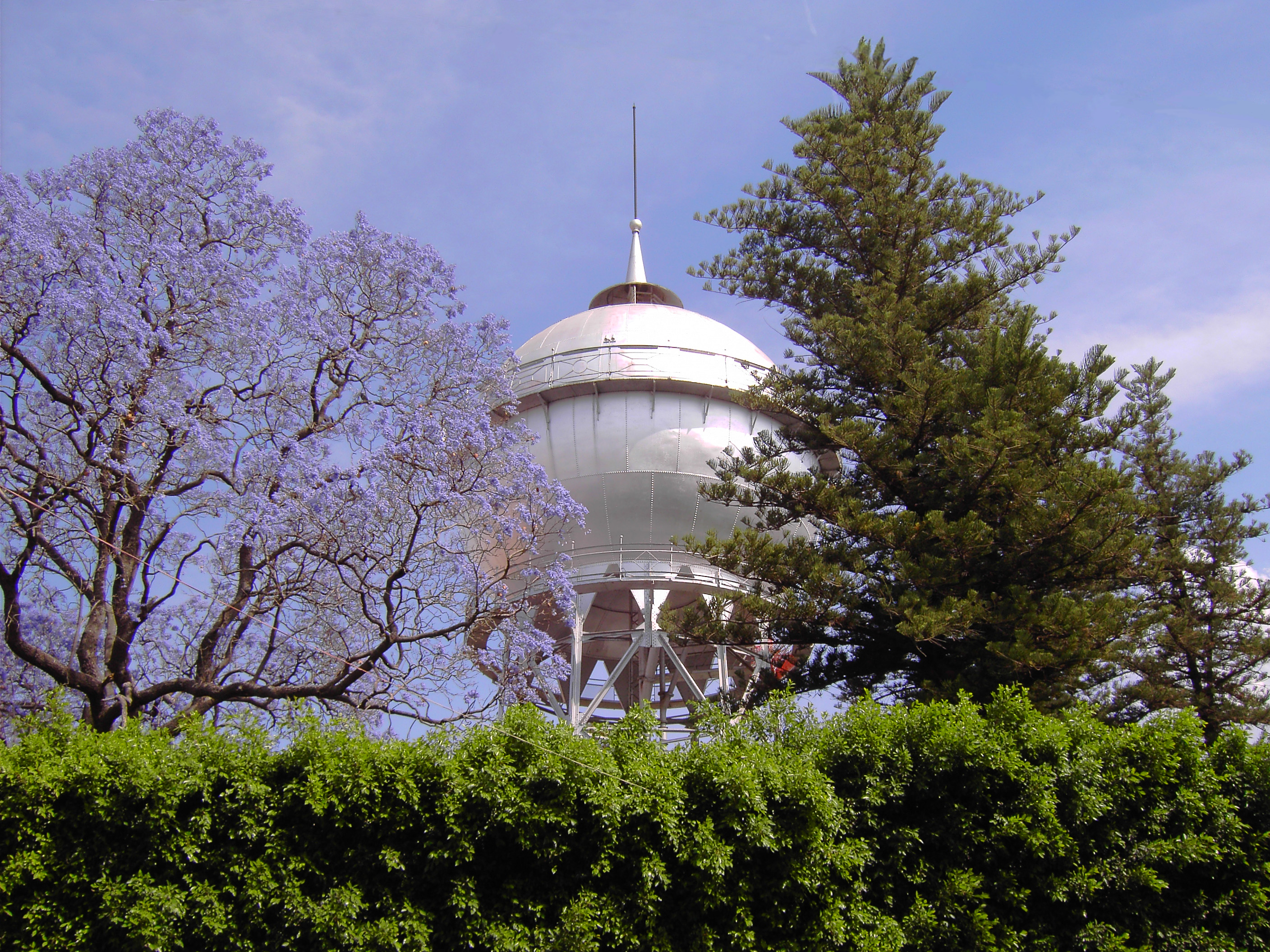
The bola de agua in Celaya; the water tower is an icon of the city.

Celaya is known in much of Mexico for its cajeta, a kind of spreadable caramel, often made with goat's milk, sugar and cinnamon. The mixture can be eaten straight from a spoon or used in a variety of recipes. The best known outlet for cajeta in the city is Cajetas La Tradicional, which has been in business for over 70 years.

Metalworking can mostly be found in the communities of Guanajuato and Salamanca. Although the capital's mines no longer produce large quantities of gold and silver, silver items are still made and sold in the city. Wrought iron work for doors, windows and railings are also a specialty in certain areas of the city. Oxidized bronze items are a specialty of Salamanca, producing mostly decorative items. Most of the items made in Guanajuato city are still done Baroque style and sold in the city center. Pénjamo is one of very few places outside of the state of Jalisco to produce tequila. It is the home of the Tequila Corralejo brand, which is still made on the now former Hacienda de Corralejo. The installation gives tours and has a museum called the Museo del Vino y la Botellas (Museum of Spirits and Bottles). The museum contains a collection of about 3,000 bottles, almost all of which with their original contents. Nearby is the factory that makes the distinctive blue bottles of this brand.

Glass making was brought to Mexico during the early colonial period. Most items made in Guanajuato are single-colored items in blue, green, yellow and red. San Miguel de Allende has the best-known tradition where curiously shaped bottles, vases, glass sets and small cups for tequila are produced. Wax candles and other items are a specialty in Salamanca, where they are especially in demand during Holy Week. Comonfort is known for the making of molcajetes from volcanic stone, and San Miguel is known for figures and other items made from brass. Dolores Hidalgo is known for ice cream and ices, much of which is simply sold next to the parish church. Flavors include sapote, mango, honey, aloe, tequila and banana.

Mining, manufacturing and construction accounts for over 27% of the state's GDP. Mining is a traditional economic activity for the state, with deposits making it one of the world's richest areas in the past. However, in comparison gold and silver ores are mostly depleted today. Gold and silver ore is still mined with silver still the major ore produced, followed by gold, lead, copper, zinc and sulfur. Most employed in mining are still related to metals rather than non-metals. Other products being mined or being studied are mercury, tin, copper, lead, sand, fluorite, feldspar, lime, kaolin, and more.

=== Agriculture ===
While the agricultural sector, which includes crops, livestock, fishing and forestry activities, accounts for only 4.6% of Guanajuato's current GDP, the sector is an important part of the state's identity and is still a major producer of a number of items nationally. The state has 1.1 million hectares suitable for agriculture, over 36% of the state's territory. Over 659,000 hectares (1,630,000 acres) of land is under cultivation, with the main crops being corn, sorghum, beans, wheat, barley and broccoli. Today, the Bajio is still one of the major grain producing regions in Mexico. Certain areas of the state have large orchards producing peaches, strawberries, cactus pear, avocado, grapes, apples, quince, walnuts, apricots and guava.

Livestock raising is an important economic activity and can be found in all parts of the state, with animals such cattle, pigs, goats, sheep and domestic fowl, with 1,451,478 hectares (3,586,680 acres) hectares dedicated to this activity. The Los Altos and Bajío are the state's livestock producing regions, especially dairy cows. It is one of the most important dairy producing states in Mexico. By volume, most of the meat produced is from domestic fowl, with pork coming in second, followed by beef, goat and sheep. Guanajuato produces 25.4% of the goat meat in the country.

Only a very small percentage of the economy is based on fishing and forestry. Fishing is not a major economic activity as it is limited to the small rivers and lakes of the region. Of the two major lakes, one is shared with neighboring Michoacán state. Of the fish is that is caught or raised, most is carp, followed by mojarra. There are 150,000 hectares of forest in the state, which about half theoretically exploitable. However, forests in this state have been historically depleted with species such as holm oak, pine and oyamel in danger of extinction. The lack of forest cover has led to erosion and other environmental problems. Most forestry products come from pine and holm oak, with most being harvested in the area around the city of Guanajuato.

=== Commerce, services and tourism ===
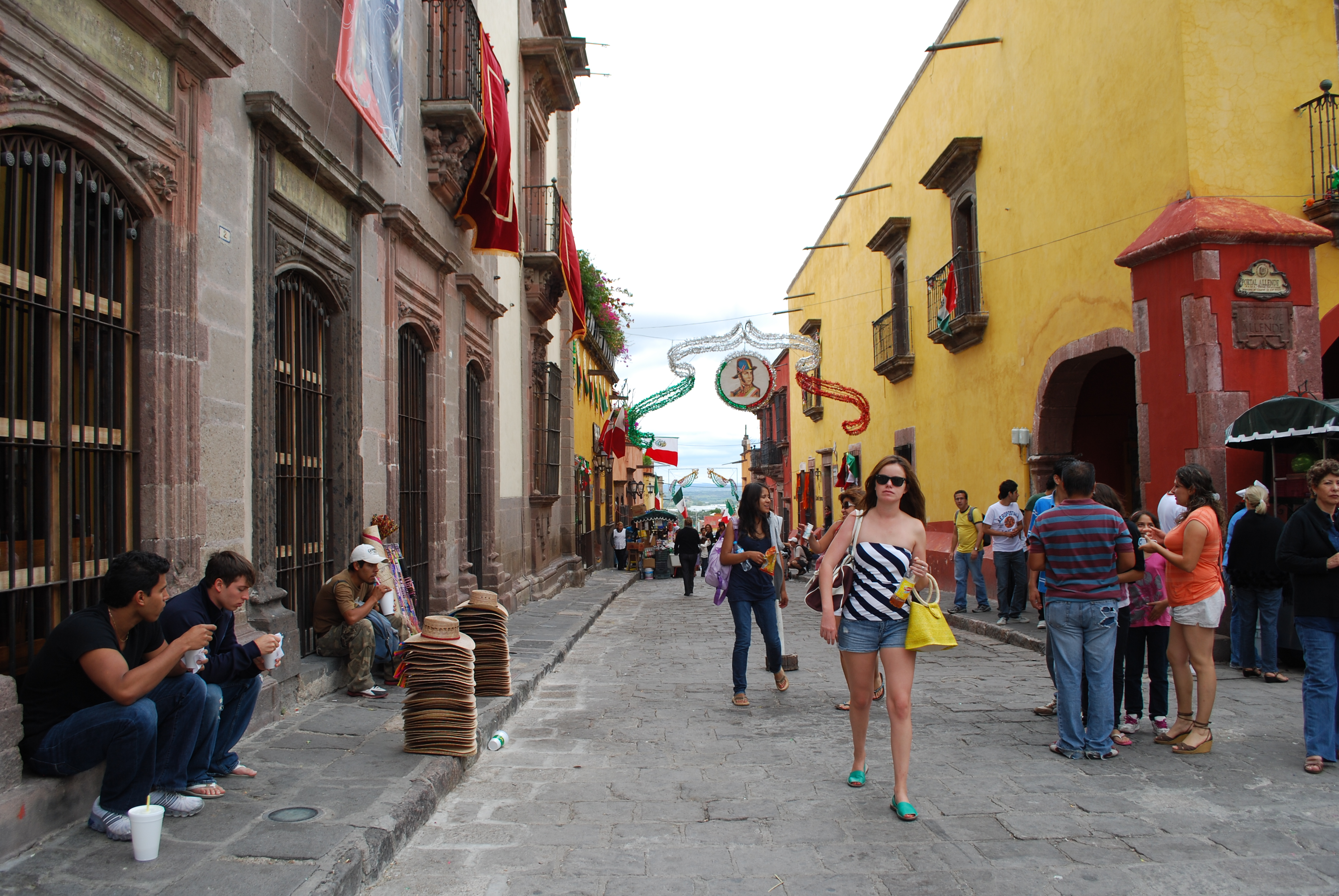
Hidalgo Street in San Miguel de Allende

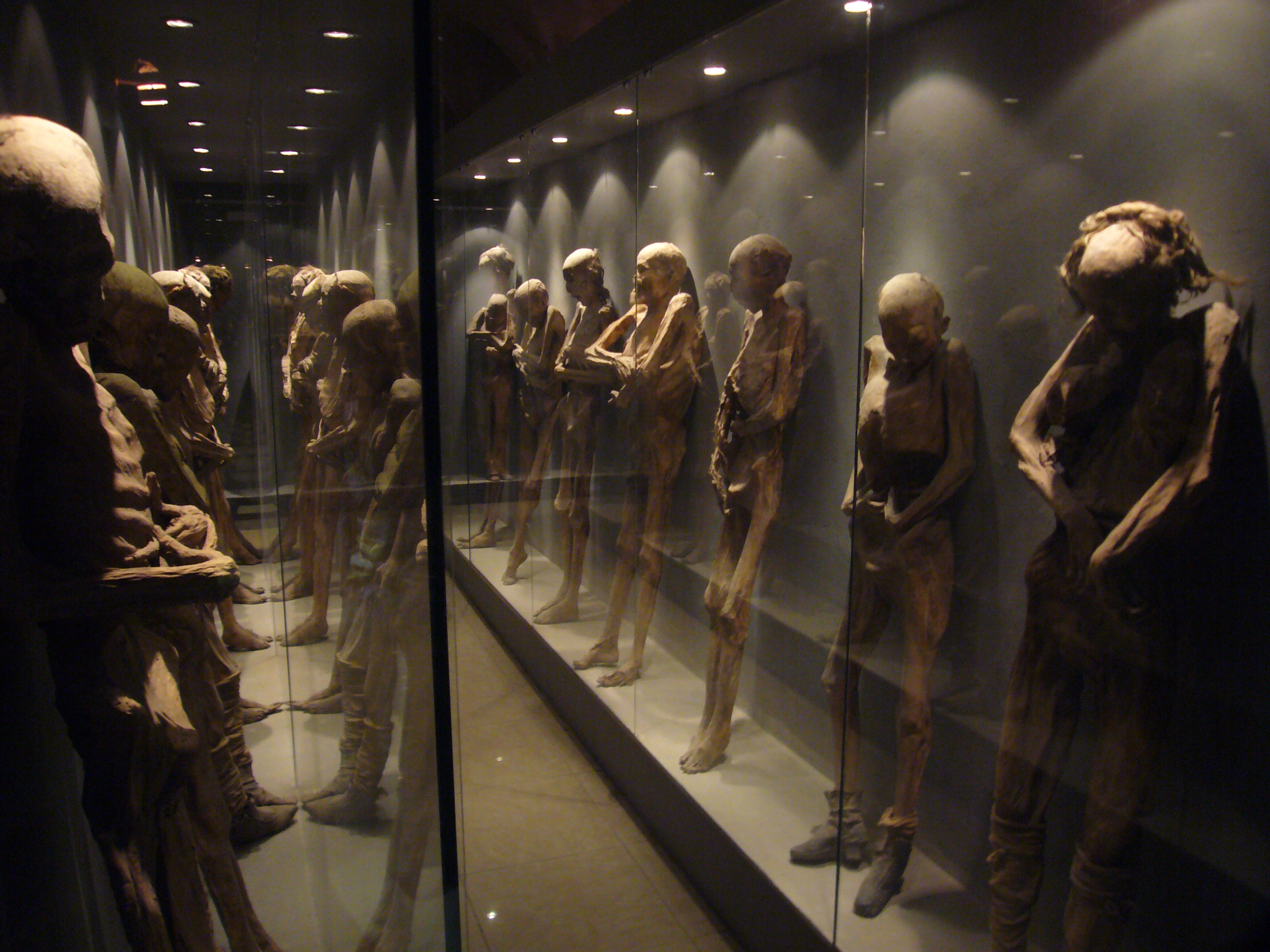
The Mummies of Guanajuato at the Museo de las Momias

About 95% of the state's visitors are from Mexico, with the rest from other countries. Within the state, there are about seventy hotels ranked as four or five stars. The three main cities for tourism are the capital city of Guanajuato, San Miguel de Allende and Dolores Hidalgo. Guanajuato is visited for its colonial architecture and its role in Mexico's history, especially during the War of Independence. Similarly, San Miguel has cultural and historical value. Both have been designated World Heritage Sites. Although not a World Heritage Site, Dolores Hidalgo is particularly important as the site as it is where Miguel Hidalgo y Costilla gave the cry called "El Grito" which began the War of Independence.

The state has set up tourist routes such as the Ruta de Independencia, Ruta de Aventura (Aventure Route), Ruta Arqueológica (Archeological Route), Ruta de los Conventos (Monastery Route) and Ruta Artesanal (Handcrafts Route). The Ruta de la Independencia or Independence Route comprises ten municipalities through which the insurgent army under Miguel Hidalgo passed. These include San Miguel de Allende, Dolores Hidalgo, Guanajuato, León, Irapuato, Pénjamo, Salamanca, Celaya, Salvatierra and Acámbaro. In preparation for the Bicentennial of Mexico's independence, the state rehabilitated and marked the sites in which the significant historic events occurred in each of these locations.

The Ruta de Aventura connects ghost towns and abandoned mines with natural areas for hiking, mountain biking and ATV as well as other extreme sports such as paragliding. One of the ghost towns is Mineral de Pozos in the northeast of the state. The town still has its cobblestone streets with names such as Relámpago (lightning), Estrellas (stars) and Flores (Flowers). The houses here are abandoned, many in ruins and none with roofs. The town reached its height during the late 19th and early 20th centuries, when it was called Ciudad Porfirio Díaz, but the mines later gave out and the population left. In 1982, the town was declared a Historic Monument Zone. Although no one lives there, tourism keeps a few businesses alive around the main square such as the Pozos cantina, which exhibits photographs and other memorabilia on its walls. Outside the town is the Santa Brigida mine which sustained the town until it gave out. It is marked by three large ovens with tall pyramid roofs. These were constructed by the Jesuits to work ore from the mine. The Ruta Arqueológica (Archeological Route) links the two pre-Hispanic sites of Plazuelas and Peralta which are currently open to visitors with two others which are scheduled to be opened sometime in the future: La Virgen de la Cañada in San Miguel de Allende and El Cóporo in Ocampo.

The Ruta de los Conventos or Monastery Route is concentrated in the south of the state, where a number of large religious complexes were built in the early colonial period for evangelization purposes. The Agustino de San Pablo Church and Monastery is located in Yuriria founded by the Augustinians who arrived from Michoacán in the 16th century. It is a monumental fortress-like construction designed by Friar Diego de Chávez y Alvarado and Pedro del Toro and constructed in an area with relatively little population. The monastery became a center from which missionaries would be trained and then sent forth and its size and battlements helped to protect it from Chichimeca attacks. The church retains its original function and Plateresque facade, but the monastery area has been converted into a museum. The Las Capucinas Church and Convent is in Salvatierra and is one of only three complexes built for nuns in the entire state during the colonial period. It has a fortress like appearance and its construction is attributed to Joaquin de Heredia, of the San Carlos Academy. During the Porfirio Díaz presidency, the convent was used as a Civil Hospital and later as a school, which still remains with the name of Colegio José María Morelos. The San Francisco Church and Monastery is in Acámbaro and built between 1734 and 1743. Its facade is Baroque of light pink stone. Inside, the church contains one of the most notable main altars in the Bajio region. It is Neoclassical built of gray and pink stone with gilded details, with an image of the Virgen María Refugio de Pecadores (Virgin Mary Refuge of Sinners), which is replica of an image in Zacatecas.

The Ruta Artesanal (Handcrafts Route) connects a number of municipalities which specialize in one or more handcrafted items, including food. These include Acámbaro, noted for its bread, Coroneo for its wool items and Tarancuaro for ceramics.

The state also has a large number of water parks and thermal springs converted into water parks. Some of these include El Trébol, Villa Gasco and Comanjilla near León, Caldera Abasolo near Irapuato and Abasolo and Los Arcos and Agua Caliente near Celaya.

== Culture ==
=== Festivals ===
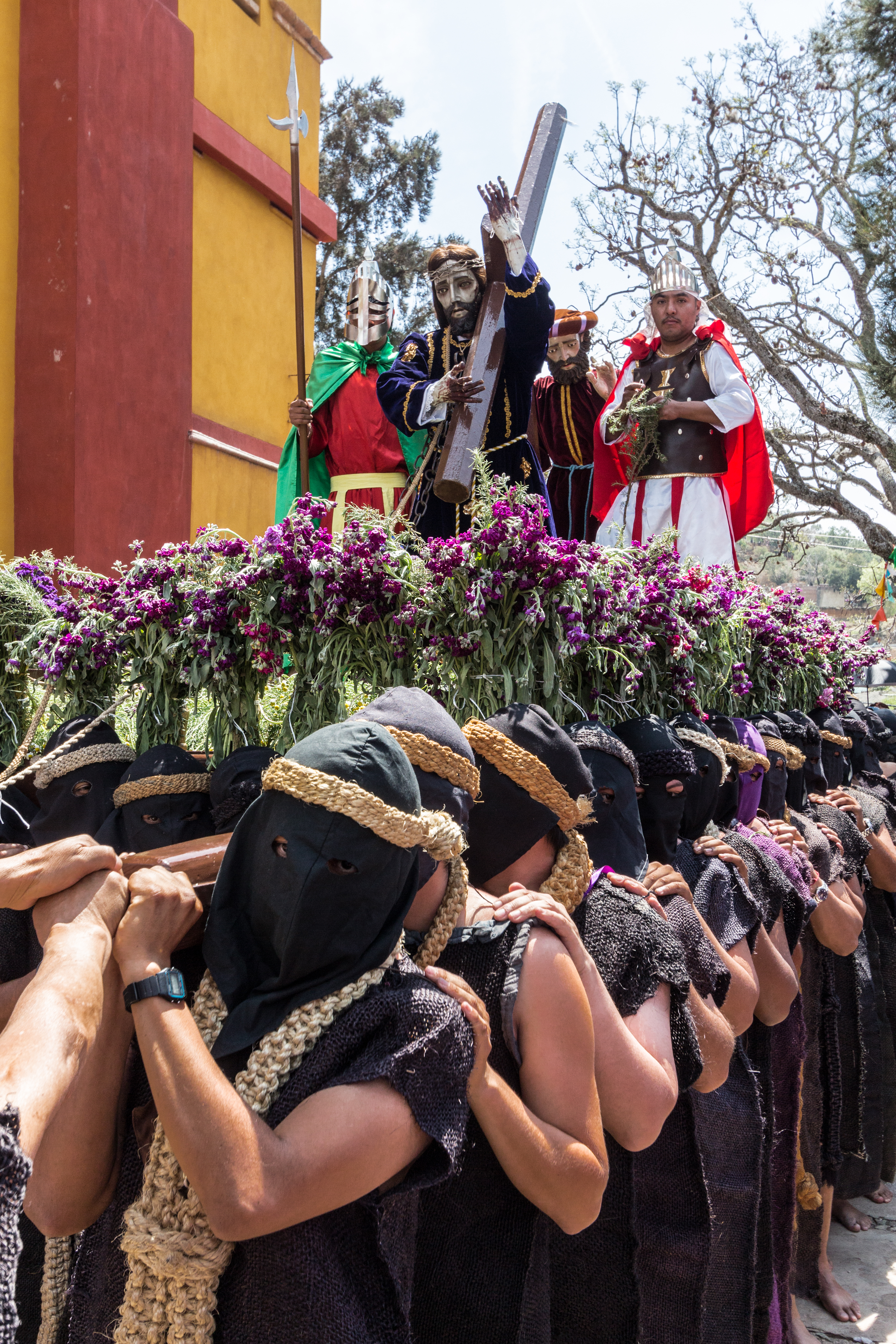
Viacrucis in Santa Ana, Guanajuato

Culturally, the state is best known for the annual Festival Internacional Cervantino, which takes place in the city of Guanajuato and some other affiliated venues in the state. The event sponsors a large number of artistic and cultural events with artists invited from Mexico and other parts of the world. The festival hosts events such as opera, theater productions, film showings, art exhibitions, academic conferences and talks, concerts and dance recitals. The performances occur in 70 different venues over most of the month of October. In addition to the major events in venues, artists such as dancers, clowns and more, give small and sometimes impromptu shows on the streets, sidewalks and small plazas that are located in the city. Because of this, the event brings many visitors to the city who wander the streets, visiting the many sights of the city. During the event, hotel occupancy rates are as high as 98%. In 2010, invited artists included the Da Motus! Swiss dance company. The event is named in honor of Miguel de Cervantes, author of Don Quixote. The festival began in 1972, as short plays performed by University of Guanajuato students based on the works of Cervantes. In 2010, special guests included the state of Querétaro and the country of Colombia. The 2010 edition of the festival included performers such as Tangokineses from Argentina, Cumbia Cienaguera from Colombia. In total, there were 424 events over 26 days.

A parallel event is the Festival International Cervantino Callejero which is sponsored by an organization called the Centro Libre de Experimentacion Teatral y Artistica (CLETA). In 2010, this event had 300 performances with social themes. This annual event was begun in 1975, in part inspired by the Beatles' Abbey Road album cover. The Festival Internacional de Cine Expresión en Corto began in 1997 and today is one of the most important cinematographic events in the country. It was established in Guanajuato in an effort to decentralize cultural events away from Mexico City. Most events associated with the festival take place in the city of Guanajuato and San Miguel Allende and awards prizes in various categories including commercials. The showing of films is sometimes in unusual locations such as one of Guanajuato's tunnels under the city or in the municipal cemetery at midnight.

=== Cuisine ===
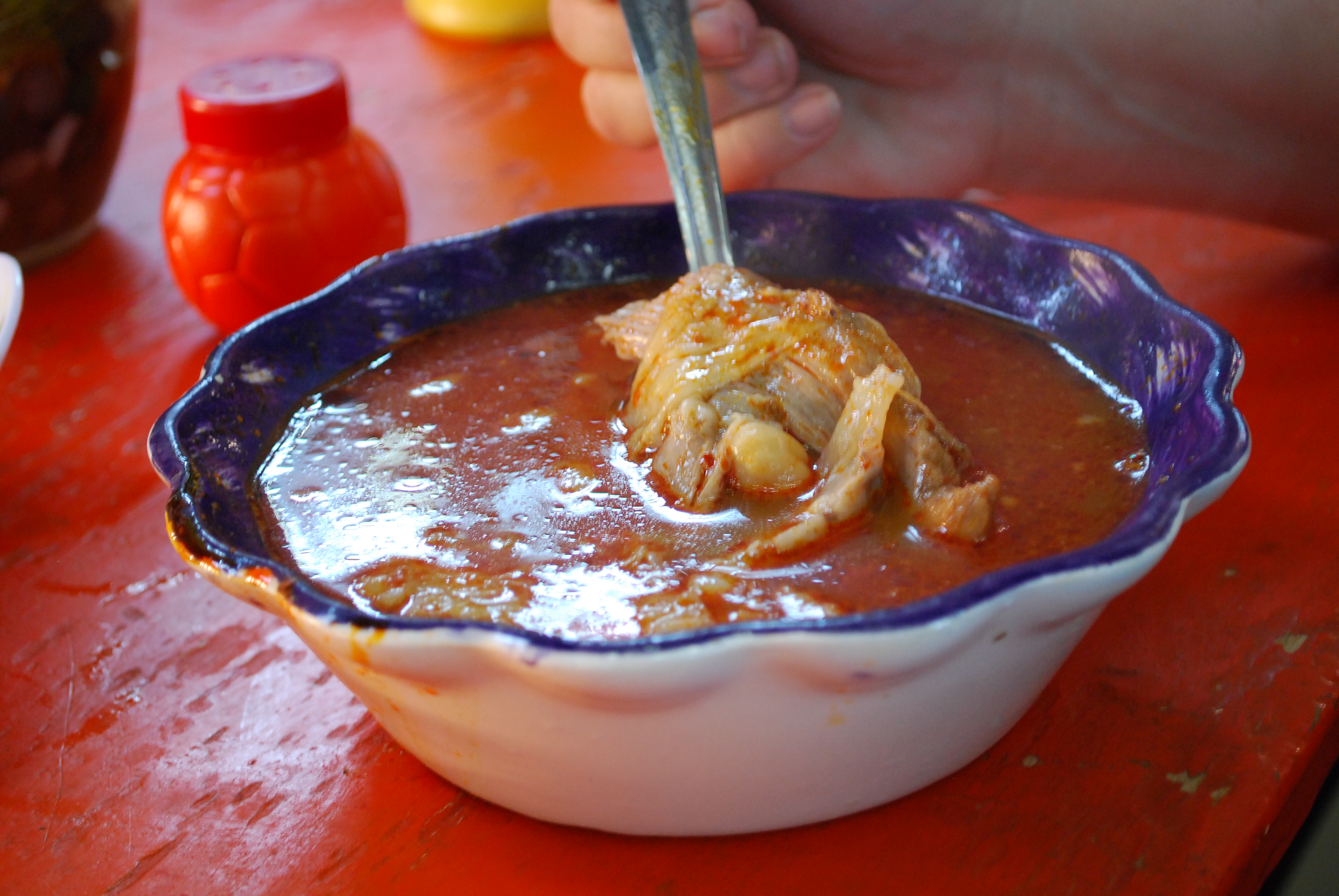
A birria dish served at the Mercado Hidalgo in Guanajuato

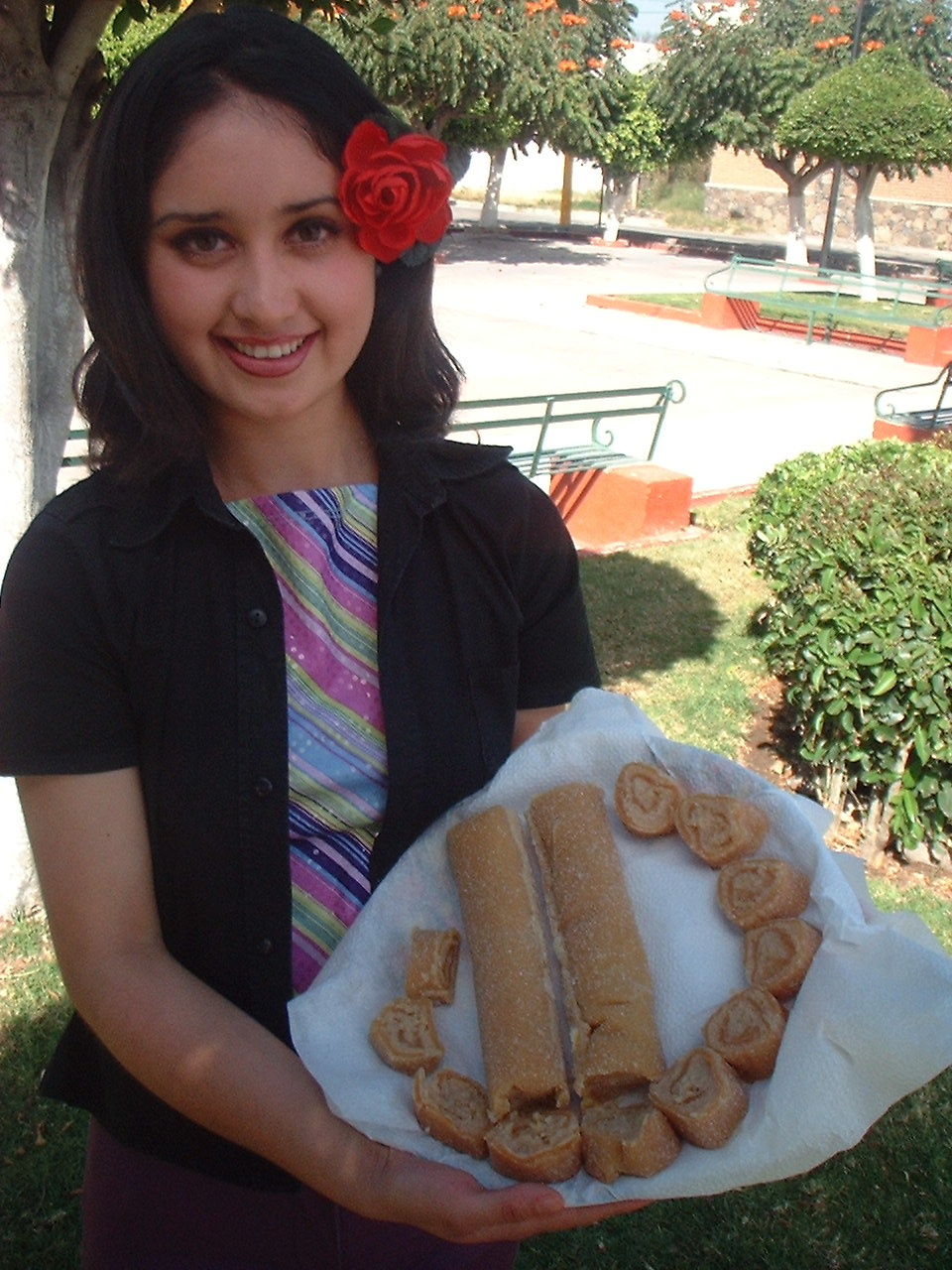
Guava rolls, a traditional sweet from Jaral del Progreso

Many of the dishes that are traditionally eaten in Guanajuato are regional variations of dishes known in other parts such as carnitas, tamales, birria and pozole. A version of the enchilada is called the enchilada minera (miners' enchilada), which is a tortilla fried in lard and then filled with chicken and covered with a sauce made with guajillo chili peppers, a ranchero cheese and chopped potatoes and carrots. Recently, there has been a movement to update many of these dishes, keeping to traditional ingredients, called "Guanajuato fusion". This is most popular in upscale restaurants in San Miguel de Allende and Guanajuato and can include dishes such as tuna with chili peppers and duck with mesquite honey.

The state is better known as the producer of a number of food products such as cajeta, bread, candy, and ice cream. The best-known food product is cajeta, a soft, spreadable sweet product made with goat's milk, sugar, and flavorings. The best known place for this is Celaya. The cajeta can be flavored with vanilla, coconut, strawberry, and others; it is eaten with a spoon from the container, spread on bread, or made into candies. Another typical sweet in the state is called charamuscas. It is made with piloncillo, which is melted to form shapes. In the city of Guanajuato, one can find charamuscas in the shape of mummies. Alfeñique refers to glass sugar based candies used to form figures and is most popular for Day of the Dead. Chilacayote is a candy made from a type of melon of the same name, which is prepared by soaking pieces of the fruit in sugar solution. Handmade ice cream is a specialty of Dolores Hidalgo, made with all natural ingredients, often using recipes passed down for generations. While ice cream and ices are made in other parts of the state, these stand out because of the many unusual flavors offered such as beer, pulque, chile relleno, even shrimp and mole. The Franciscans taught the indigenous how to work with wheat and bake bread. Because there had already been a tradition of kneading clay for pottery, the kneading and baking of wheat bread became established quickly, adapting the original recipes to local tastes. The best known breads are those from Acámbaro, especially the type called "pan grande". Other well-known types are pan ranchero, tallado, pan huevo and pan leche. The first indigenous master baker in Guanajuato was Abraham de Silva Cuín, who, in 1526, began to make breads in unique forms and flavors.

=== Architecture ===
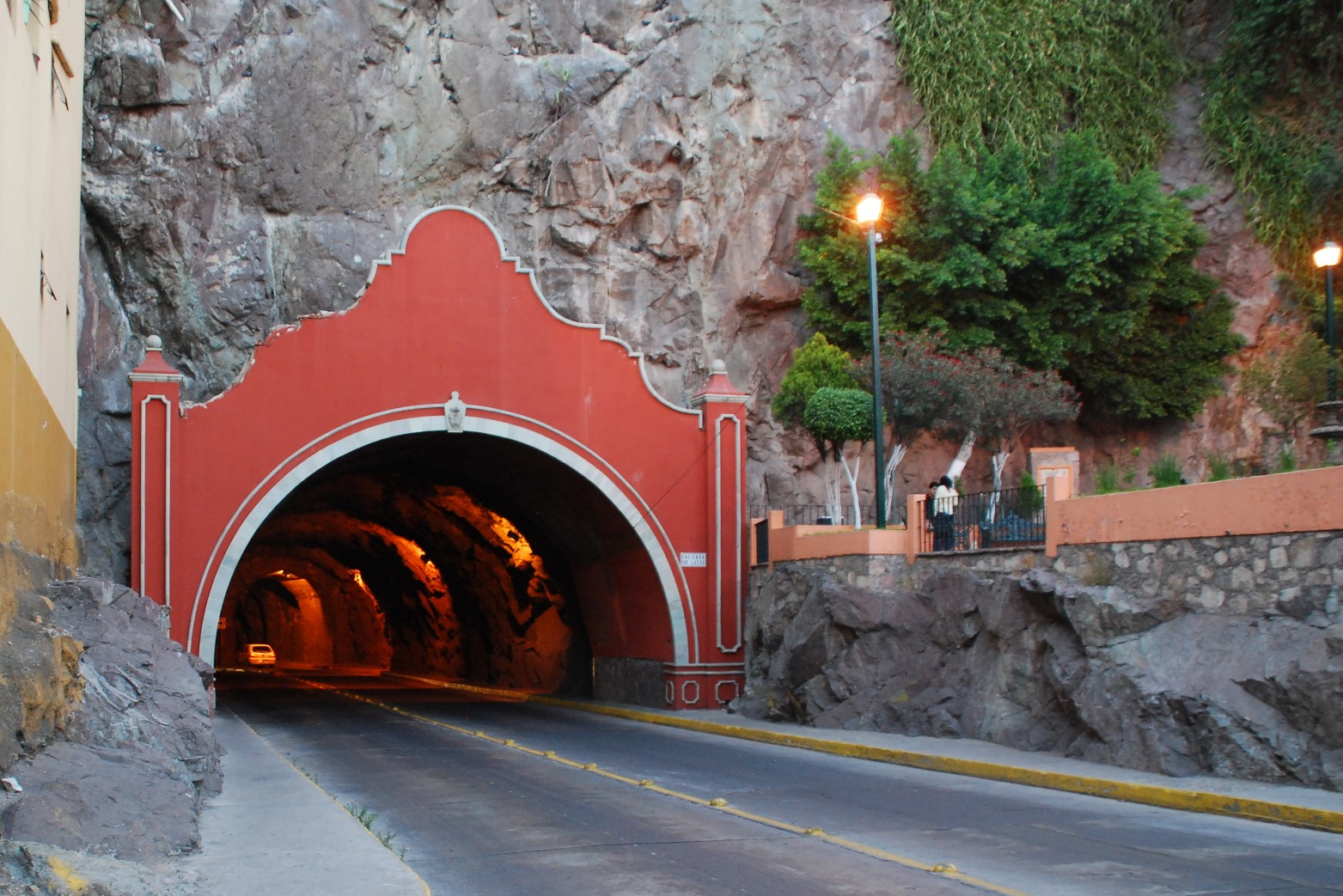
Entrance to a tunnel in the city of Guanajuato

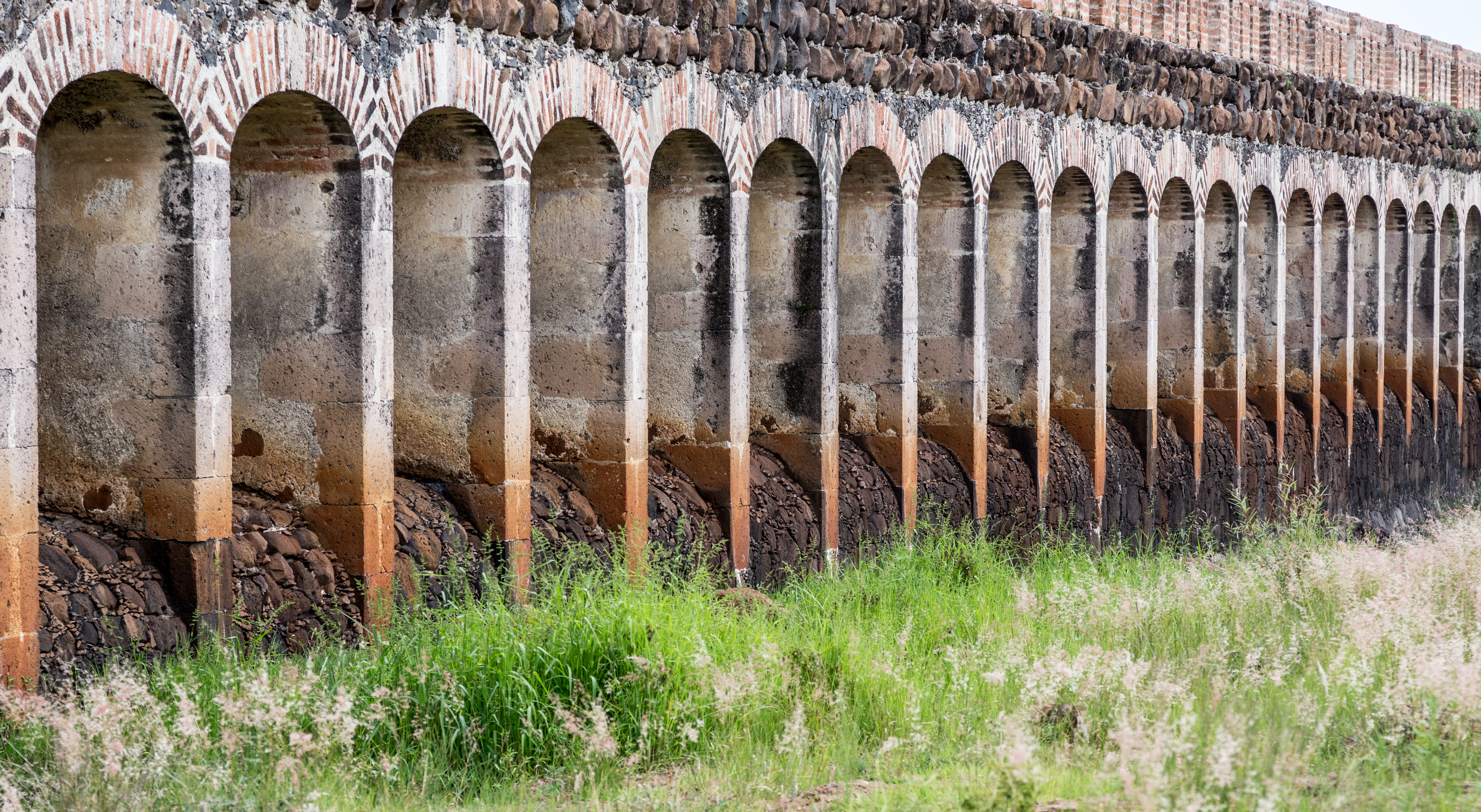
Detail of the dam of Jalpa de Cánovas, Purísima del Rincón designed by British-Mexican architect Luis Long

Most of the state's architecturally significant buildings are in Mexican Baroque style, especially in the capital city. This was because the mines of the state were at maximum production during the 18th century, when this style was fashionable. It can be found in mansions and civil buildings of that time but the most ornate examples are churches, with intricate facades and altarpieces both which often use the "estipite" column (inverted, truncated pyramid). A number of Baroque altarpieces from this time are also gilded with gold from local mines. Within the city of Guanajuato, the most notable examples are the San Cayetano or La Valenciana Church, the Basilica of Guanajuato, the Temple of the Company of Jesus and the San Roque Church. Outside the capital, notable examples include the Parish of Nuestra Señora de los Dolores, the La Tercera Orden Temple and the Casa de Visitas in Dolores Hidalgo, the San Francisco Church and Monastery and the San Agustin Church in Celaya, and the Basilica Cathedral and the Nuestra Señora de los Angeles Church in León. There are some examples were the Baroque also contains indigenous elements such as the San José Church in Irapuato and the San Agustin Monastery and Church in Yuriria. At the beginning of the 19th century, Baroque was giving way to Neoclassical. The Mexican War of Independence ended most major constructions, but in many churches in the state, Baroque altarpieces were replaced with Neoclassical ones. A few Neoclassical constructions did manage to be built, mostly by Francisco Eduardo Tresguerras and include the obelisk monument to Charles IV of Spain, the Del Carmen Church, The San Agustin Tower and the Dolores Chapel. Neoclassical works by others include the Entrance Arch of León, the Teatro Principal in Guanajuato and the Santiago Apostól Parish in Silao. From the 19th century on, trends became more modern with one notable exception. The Parish of San Miguel in San Miguel Allende had its facade redone by self-taught architect Zeferino Gutierrez. Working from only images from postcards of Gothic cathedrals in Europe, Gutierrez created the imposing Gothic-like front, which is unique in the state.

The uniqueness of the state of Guanajuato even led Disney's Coco team to be inspired by the city. The colorful buildings all over Mexico gave the animators inspiration to bring the culture and heritage to the film.

=== Arts and literature ===
Guanajuato is home or place of origin of three important painters: Diego Rivera, José Chávez Morado and Olga Costa. Rivera was born in the city of Guanajuato and spent his early childhood there. When he was older, he moved to Mexico City to study painting and eventually became one of Mexico's most famous muralists. José Chávez Morado was a prolific painter who lived and worked in the city of Guanajuato. He initially worked with José Clemente Orozco, who impressed him both with art as well as politics. Chávez Morado's most prolific period was between 1955 and 1967, when he realized works in the Ciudad Universitaria in Mexico City, the Secretariat of Communications and Transportation building in Mexico City and the Alhóndiga de Granaditas in his hometown. Olga Costa's real last name was Kostakowsky, but it was Hispanicized to Costa. She was born in Leipzig, Germany but she and her family moved to Mexico when she was very young. She was friends with and contemporaries of Diego Rivera, Frida Kahlo, Rufino Tamayo and Carlos Mérida, as well as wife to José Chávez Morado. She is best known for founding the Galería Espiral and co-founder of the Sociedad de Arte Moderno and the Salon de Plastica Mexicana. Her best known work is titled "Vendedora de Frutas". Other artists include Manuel Leal, whose works are mostly scenes from the state, Romualdo Garcia, better known as a photographer than painter, Hermenegildo Bustos, Hilario Gómez Sánchez and Luis Ferro Márquez. The state also produced one well-known sculptor by the name of Tomás Chávez Morado, brother of José. His works can be seen at the Museo Regional de la Alhóndiga de Granaditas and the Museo del Caracol in Mexico City.

Guanajuato's three main literary figures are Jorge Ibargüengoitia, Juan Ibáñez and Efraín Huerta. Ibargüengoitia was one of Mexico's most important writers of the 20th century, noted for his satirical works with social themes. Examples of his work include Los relámpagos de agosto, Los pasos de Lopez and Estas ruinas que ves. Ibáñez was a dramatist who was active in the second half of the 20th century. His best known work is Los caifanes, produced as a movie in 1966. Huerta began as a journalist and movie critic but his fame came as a poet. Some of his works include Absoluto amor, Línea del alba, Poemas de guerra y esperanza, and La rosa primitiva.

== Government and politics ==
Politically the state is divided into eight regions: Region I North/Dolores Hidalgo, Region II North-East/San Luis de la Paz, Region III/León, Region IV Center-West/Guanajuato, Region V East/Celaya, Region VI South-West/Irapuato, Region VII Center-South/Salamanca and Region VIII/South-East/Acambaro. It is also divided into 46 municipalities for local government purposes. The municipalities are grouped into 15 political regions for elections.

The state government is headed by an elected governor who controls the executive branch of government. The governor has one six-year term with no reelection. The governor is required to report on the state of the government each year on August 1. This branch contains a large number of secretariats and other offices related to social issues, economic issues, education, law and administration. The legislative branch is unicameral with 36 elected representatives. Elections for congress occur every three years. This branch has various commissions related to legal, municipal and economic issues. The judicial branch consists of various levels of courts as well as the attorneys general offices. They are all presided over by a "presidencia".

== Education ==
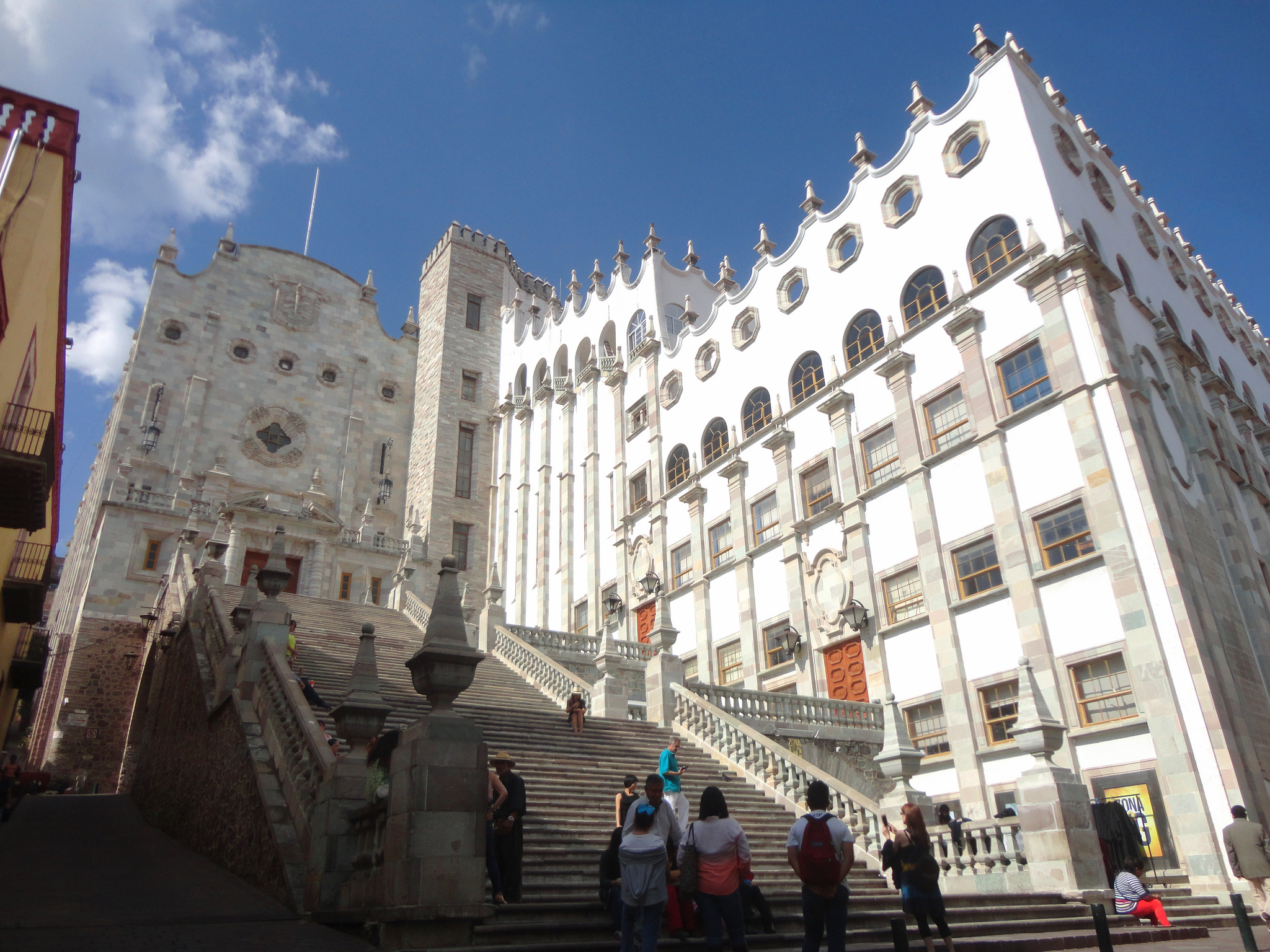
View of the main building of the University of Guanajuato

Guanajuato ranks seventh in the country in the number of schools per capita and sixth in teacher-student ratio. The state has over 4,000 preschools, 4,600 primary schools, about 1400 middle schools, about 650 high schools, 73 teachers' colleges, 125 institutions offering bachelor's degrees and 60 offering advanced degrees. 12.1% of the population over 15 is illiterate according to the 2005 census.

About half of the state's municipalities have one or more institutions of higher education, with the most important being the University of Guanajuato. This university is in the city of Guanajuato, and began as a Jesuit school for children in the first half of the 18th century. The establishment of this school was sponsored by Josefa Teresa de Busto y Moya, sister of the Marquis of San Clemente, who obtained permission for the school from the Spanish Crown in 1732 and established the institution in her home. She donated a fifth of her fortune to it and worked to obtain donations from other wealthy families in the city. Over time, the school grew and began to offer high school and professional level studies. It had several names over its history, from Real Colegio de la Purísima Concepción (1767), Colegio del Estado (1828), and Colegio Nacional de Guanajuato (1867) to its current name, adopted in 1945. The name "Colegio del Estado" was prompted by the fact that the institution became property of the state in 1828. In 1945, it gained university status.

Today the institution serves approximately 30,000 students at the high school, bachelor's and graduate levels. In addition to the main campus in the city, there are nine others in other parts of Guanajuato state. The university hosts a number of the events of the Festival Cervantino, with its famous stairway acting as seating. The institution's best-known facility is the main building in Guanajuato city, which was built in Neoclassical style in green stone. It houses the Dean's office, administrative offices and a number of the institution's departments. The main building is recognizable by its long staircase with 113 steps, which empties onto the Callejon del Estudiante. Under the main roof is a 16th-century chapel that was sponsored by Vasco de Quiroga for indigenous mine workers, the Templo de los Hospitales (Temple of the Hospitals). It is also the place that received the image of the Virgin of the Rosary, now called the Nuestra Señora de Guanajuato.

Other institutions include Instituto Tecnológico y de Estudios Superiores de Monterrey (ITESM) campus León and Irapuato, Universidad de León (UDL), Politécnico de Guanajuato, Universidad De La Salle Bajío, Universidad Iberoamericana, Universidad Santa Fe, Universidad de Celaya, Universidad Quetzalcóatl, Universidad Pedagógica Nacional (UPN), Instituto Politécnico Nacional (IPN) Unidad Profesional Interdisciplinaria de Ingeniería (UPIIUG). Instituto Tecnológico de Celaya (ITC), Instituto Tecnológico Roque (ITR), Instituto Tecnológico de León (ITL), Universidad Tecnológica del Norte de Guanajuato (UTNG), Universidad Tecnológica de León (UTL), Universidad Tecnológica del Suroeste del Estado (UTSOE), Universidad Tecnológica de San Miguel de Allende, Universidad Tecnológica de Salamanca, Universidad Politécnica de Guanajuato (UPG), Universidad Politécnica de Penjamo (UPPE), Universidad Politécnica de Juventino Rosas (UPJR) and Universidad Politécnica del Bicentenario (UPB), Instituto Tecnológico Superior de Irapuato (ITESI), Instituto Tecnológico Superior de Guanajuato (ITESG), Instituto Tecnológico Superior del Sur de Guanajuato (ITSUR), and Instituto Tecnológico Superior de Salvatierra. Universidad Nacional Autónoma de México (UNAM) has begun to build a campus in the city of León to serve 15,000 students in the west of Mexico. The project will be built on a 60-hectare site in the south of the city to serve students in Guanajuato, Jalisco, Aguascalientes, Querétaro, San Luis Potosí, Michoacán and Zacatecas, starting in 2011. The first major to be offered is orthodontics, which is not offered by any other school in the region and will be followed by 11 others. Guanajuato also has the research centers CIMAT, CINVESTAV, CRODE, CIATEC, CIO, CICSUG, CIQI, IIBE, IIEDUG, IIC, IIM, INIFAP, and the laboratories CFE LAPEM and LANGEBIO.

== Media ==
Newspapers of Guanajuato include: a. m. de Guanajuato, a. m. de Irapuato, a. m. de San Francisco del Rincón, a. m. el periódico libre de Celaya, Al Día, El Heraldo de León, El Sol de Irapuato, El Sol de Salamanca, El Sol del Bajío, Esto del Bajío, La Prensa del Bajío, Milenio León, Noticias Vespertinas, Periódico AM, líder en noticias de León, and Periódico Correo.

== Transportation ==
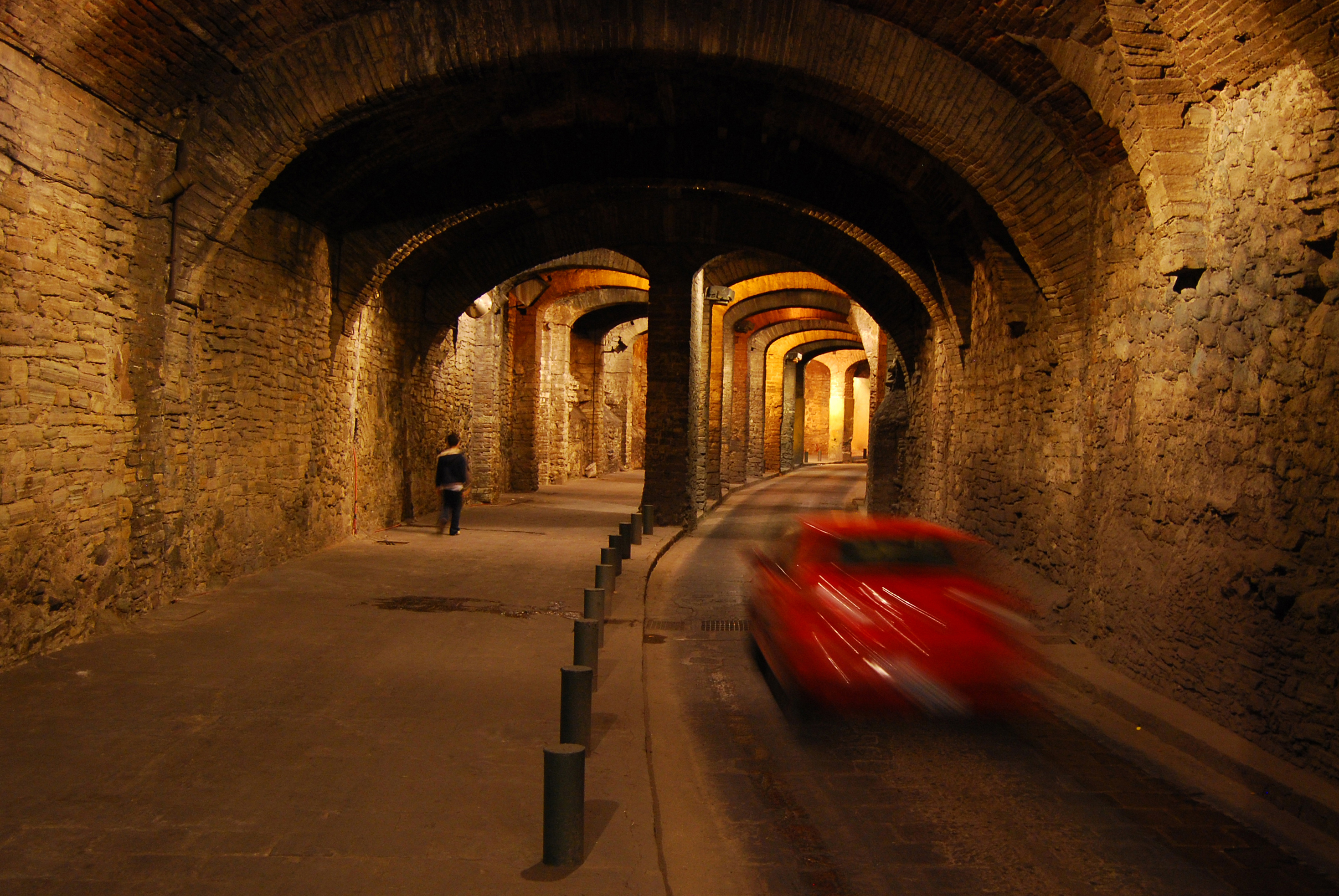
A car and pedestrian pass in a tunnel under Guanajuato city.

Guanajuato's highways directly connect to three of Mexico's ten major highways (Mexico City-Nuevo Laredo, Querétaro-Ciudad Juárez and Manzanillo-Tampico). The state has 11,061 km (6,873 mi) of highway, 5,281 km (3,281 mi) of which are rural. It also has 1,249 km (776 mi) of federal highways and 2,462 of state highways. In July 2010, the state government of Guanajuato in Mexico awarded the 30-year concession of the US$122 million Libramiento de Celaya toll road to consortium Concesionaria Bicentenario. The consortium will be responsible for constructing, operating and maintaining two highway sections. Work on the 12.9 km Libramiento Nororiente stretch was scheduled to start in September 2010 and on the 16.5 km Libramiento Sur stretch on August 9, 2010.

Like in the rest of Mexico, rail lines are almost exclusively used for the transportation of freight in the industrial areas of the state and, like the highway system, connects to most of the major national lines, with a total of 1,085 km (674 mi) in the state. The most important line is the Empalme Escobedo in the municipalities of Comonfort, Acámbaro and Irapuato. In Celaya, there is a "ferropuerto" (rail-port), an installation on 57 hectares used to transfer 1 million tons of freight each year. The facility has customs and other offices to facilitates international shipments.

The Guanajuato International Airport, formerly the Bajío International Airport is located in the municipality of Silao between the cities of Silao and León. The airport currently serves ten airlines and serves many domestic and international destinations. There is one other airport in Celaya which serves domestic destinations as well as airfields in San Miguel Allende, Doctor Mora, Irapuato, Manuel Doblado and San Francisco del Rincón.

== Archeological sites ==
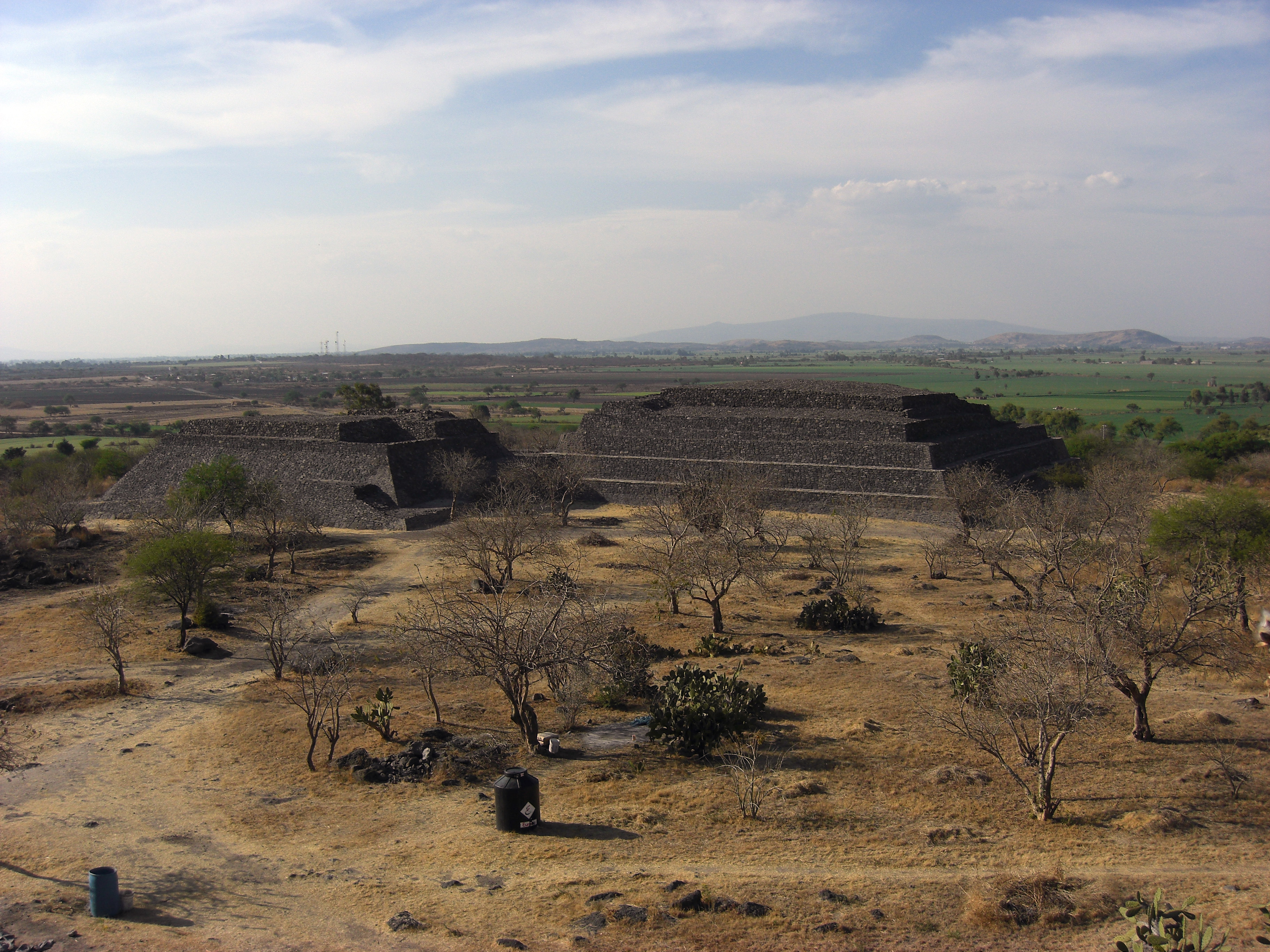
Peralta archeological site

Chupícuaro is a site located in the south of the state on one side of the Lerma River. It is one of the older sites of Mesoamerica, having been active from 800 BCE to 300 CE and shows some of the earliest evidence of agriculture. The site has low flat rectangular platforms, with evidence of earlier structures below, which were probably the foundation of multigenerational houses; however most of the site is now under the waters of the Solís Dam. This site, along with some nearby contemporary sites, is known for its pottery called "Blanco Levantado", characterized with red and other colored lines on a light or cream background. This pottery has been shown to have elements in common with pottery in Zacatecas, other areas in northwest Mexico and even that of the Hohokam in Arizona and researchers believe that these people had trade relations that far north even finding turquoise. While the site has been extensively studied, it has also suffered looting, including some at the hands of Guanajuato authorities.

Tierra Blanca is a large site which was a true city, not a ceremonial site, but most of the site had been sacked and practically destroyed when it fell and later as an archeological site although early photographs of it remain. There is evidence in Tula that this city, or one like it, had had significant influence on the Tula civilization. For this reason, the time span for Tierra Blanca is placed at before 950 CE although there is little evidence at the site itself to date it.

Carabino is located in the northeast of the state. At this site items from and influenced by the city of Tula are found dating the city to about 900 to 1150 CE. There is some evidence to suggest that the city was a colony of one of the cities of the center of Mexico. In Villa de Reyes in the far north in the Valley of San Luis, there also evidence of Toltec presence or influence. However, this later site was occupied first between 550 and 710 CE, then again in the Toltec era 200 to 300 years later. Evidence suggests that groups in these parts of Guanajuato had an effect on the organization of the Toltec Empire as settlements were abandoned sometime between 600 and 900 CE. Through the Toltecs' influence in the Valley of Mexico, Guanajuato cultures eventually had some influence on the much later Aztec.

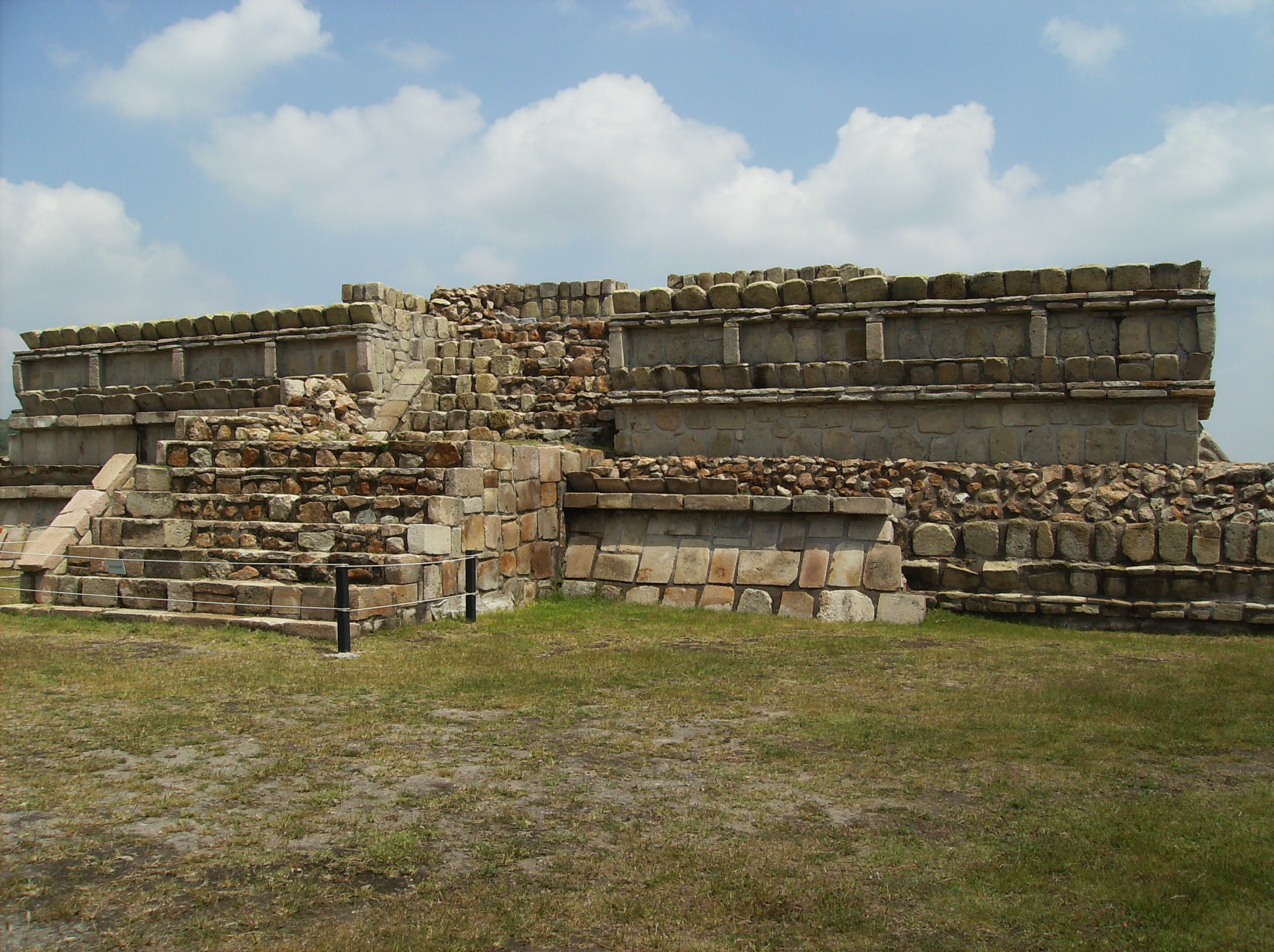
One of the structures at the Plazuelas archeological site

Plazuelas is located just west of Pénjamo in the foothills of the Sierra de Pénjamo. The site, which is noted for the complexity of its architecture, was occupied during the first millennium of the Common Era with its height at around 600 to 900 CE. The site was constructed over three hillsides separated by two large arroyos called Los Cuijes and Agua Nacida. The ethnicity of its occupants is not known nor is its original name. It appears to have been a theocracy with the elite inhabiting the hillsides and the rest of the population on flatter lands below. The most important construction at the site is the complex called Casas Tapadas, which contains several large structures and one Mesoamerican ball court.

Peralta is located on Abasolo, 21 km from Pénjamo. It developed between 300 and 700 CE, at the time that Teotihuacan was declining and Tula was rising. According to archeologists, the city declined and collapsed due to the overexploitation of the surrounding deciduous rainforest and it was abandoned around 900 CE. The site occupies 150 hectares divided into a center with five surrounding settlements. The most important structure is called the "Patio Hundido" (Sunken Patio), whose name comes from the four pyramids that are at the corners. Another important building is the La Mesita (The Small Table) or Recinto de los Gobernantes (Governors' Precinct). It has a large plaza which is considered to have been the main square for the city. Among the walls and other structures a semicircle dedicated to the Danza de Voladores has been discovered.

Cañada de la Virgen contains a number of closely related architectonic complexes. Complex A, also called the Casa de los Trece Cielos (House of the Thirteen Heavens or Skies), consists of a large "sunken" patio like that in Peralta surrounded a pyramidal base over 25 meters high and platforms that enclose the west, north and south sides. El Cóporo is situated on a small mountain and probably used by a group related to the Toltecs. It was at its height between 500 and 600 CE. but abandoned by 900 CE. It is a ceremonial center constructed of adobe and earth. One unique aspect of its construction is a series of columns which sink into the earth to a depth of about two and a half meters. Other archeological sites in the state include Morales in San Miguel and El Cóporo in the northwest. The latter has figurines that show influence from groups in Zacatecas.

== See also ==
- Bajío

== Bibliography ==
- Jimenez Gonzalez, Victor Manuel, ed. (2009). Guanajuato: Guia para descubrir los encantos del Guanajuato [Guanajuato: Guide to discover the charms of Guanajuato] (in Spanish). Mexico City: Editorial Oceano de Mexico SA de CV.
- Quintanar Hinajosa, Beatriz, ed. (August 2010). "Guanajuato". Mexico Desconocido (Descubre Guanajuato Ruta de la Independencia Guia Especial) (in Spanish). Mexico City: Impresiones Aereas SA de CV: 23–24. ISSN 1870-9397.
