= List of television stations in Guanajuato =

The following is a list of all IFT-licensed over-the-air television stations broadcasting in the Mexican state of Guanajuato.

== List of television stations ==
RF	VC	Call sign	Location	Network/name	ERP	Concessionaire
35	4	XHCPAM-TDT	Acámbaro	TV4 (4.2, 4.3)	0.6353 kW	Gobierno del Estado de Guanajuato
24	4	XHCPAZ-TDT	Atarjea	TV4 (4.2, 4.3)	.12 kW	Gobierno del Estado de Guanajuato
33	1	XHMAS-TDT	Celaya; Guanajuato; León (RF 16); La Piedad, Mich.	Azteca Uno (adn40)	100.27 kW; 5.17 kW; 71.36 kW; 3.9 kW	Televisión Azteca
30	4	XHCPBE-TDT	Celaya	TV4 (4.2, 4.3)	29.9 kW	Gobierno del Estado de Guanajuato
17	7	XHCCG-TDT	Celaya; Guanajuato; León (RF 14); La Piedad, Mich.	Azteca 7 (a+)	99.33 kW; 5.17 kW; 71.49 kW; 10.31 kW	Televisión Azteca
20	14	XHSPRCE-TDT	Celaya	SPR multiplex (11.1 Canal Once, 14.1 Canal Catorce, 20.1 TV UNAM, 22.1 Canal 22)	14.74 kW	Sistema Público de Radiodifusión del Estado Mexicano
19	15	XHCEP-TDT	Celaya	Local independent	.5 kW	Patronato de Televisión Cultural de Guanajuato, A.C.
25	4	XHCPBG-TDT	Comonfort	TV4 (4.2, 4.3)	.15 kW	Gobierno del Estado de Guanajuato
24	4	XHCPBH-TDT	Coroneo	TV4 (4.2, 4.3)	.4776 kW	Gobierno del Estado de Guanajuato
24	4	XHCPDB-TDT	Doctor Mora	TV4 (4.2, 4.3)	.029 kW	Gobierno del Estado de Guanajuato
35	4	XHCPDK-TDT	Dolores Hidalgo	TV4 (4.2, 4.3)	1.032 kW	Gobierno del Estado de Guanajuato
35	4	XHCPDL-TDT	Guanajuato	TV4 (4.2, 4.3)	0.641 kW	Gobierno del Estado de Guanajuato
35	4	XHCPDM-TDT	Huanímaro	TV4 (4.2, 4.3)	.029 kW	Gobierno del Estado de Guanajuato
31	4	XHCPDN-TDT	Jerécuaro	TV4 (4.2, 4.3)	.03228 kW	Gobierno del Estado de Guanajuato
35	4	XHCPNO-TDT	Juventino Rosas	TV4 (4.2, 4.3)	.29 kW	Gobierno del Estado de Guanajuato
27	2	XHLGT-TDT	León	Las Estrellas (N+ Foro)	180 kW	Televimex
26	3	XHCTLE-TDT	León	Imagen Televisión (Excélsior TV)	10 kW	Cadena Tres I, S.A. de C.V.
25	4	XHCPDQ-TDT	León	TV4 (4.2, 4.3)	336 kW	Gobierno del Estado de Guanajuato
24	5	XHLEJ-TDT	León; Lagos de Moreno, Jal.	Canal 5	180 kW; 19 kW	Radio Televisión
31	6	XHLGG-TDT	Cerro Los Tenamastes, Jal. (Note: This site is on the Jalisco-Guanajuato state line to the north of León.); León	Canal 6 (Milenio Televisión, CGTN En Español, Popcorn Central)	47.5 kW; 70 kW	Multimedios Televisión
23	12	XHL-TDT	León; Celaya-Irapuato (VC 23)	Televisa Regional (9.1 Nu9ve)	180 kW; 50 kW; 19 kW	Televisora de Occidente
36	13	XHTMGJ-TDT	León; Lagos de Moreno, Jal.	Telsusa (Canal 13)	100 kW	Telsusa Televisión México
34	14	XHSPRLA-TDT	León	SPR multiplex (11.1 Canal Once, 14.1 Canal Catorce, 20.1 TV UNAM, 22.1 Canal 22)	39.02 kW	Sistema Público de Radiodifusión del Estado Mexicano
26	4	XHCPDR-TDT	Ocampo	TV4 (4.2, 4.3)	0.05 kW	Gobierno del Estado de Guanajuato
21	4	XHCPDS-TDT	Pénjamo	TV4 (4.2, 4.3)	.5 kW	Gobierno del Estado de Guanajuato
31	4	XHCPDT-TDT	Salvatierra	TV4 (4.2, 4.3)	0.215 kW	Gobierno del Estado de Guanajuato
30	4	XHCPDU-TDT	San Diego de la Unión	TV4 (4.2, 4.3)	1 kW	Gobierno del Estado de Guanajuato
33	4	XHCPDV-TDT	San Felipe	TV4 (4.2, 4.3)	.4356 kW	Gobierno del Estado de Guanajuato
30	4	XHCPDW-TDT	San José Iturbide	TV4 (4.2, 4.3)	1.076 kW	Gobierno del Estado de Guanajuato
25	4	XHCPDX-TDT	San Luis de la Paz	TV4 (4.2, 4.3)	.29 kW	Gobierno del Estado de Guanajuato
24	4	XHCPDY-TDT	San Miguel de Allende	TV4 (4.2, 4.3)	3.8 kW	Gobierno del Estado de Guanajuato
30	4	XHCPDZ-TDT	Santa Catarina	TV4 (4.2, 4.3)	.2512 kW	Gobierno del Estado de Guanajuato
25	4	XHCPEA-TDT	Santiago Maravatio	TV4 (4.2, 4.3)	.05 kW	Gobierno del Estado de Guanajuato
21	4	XHCPEB-TDT	Tarandacuao	TV4 (4.2, 4.3)	.1452 kW	Gobierno del Estado de Guanajuato
25	4	XHCPEC-TDT	Tarimoro	TV4 (4.2, 4.3)	.29 kW	Gobierno del Estado de Guanajuato
23	4	XHCPED-TDT	Tierra Blanca	TV4 (4.2, 4.3)	.1264 kW	Gobierno del Estado de Guanajuato
27	4	XHCPEE-TDT	Victoria	TV4 (4.2, 4.3)	.029 kW	Gobierno del Estado de Guanajuato
22	4	XHCPEF-TDT	Xichu	TV4 (4.2, 4.3)	.3 kW	Gobierno del Estado de Guanajuato

=== Defunct stations ===
- XHGSM-TDT RF 23, virtual 8 (formerly analog 4) (2000–2021)
