= 1st federal electoral district of Guanajuato =

Federal electoral district of Mexico

Guanajuato's 1st
- Electoral district of the Chamber of Deputies of Mexico

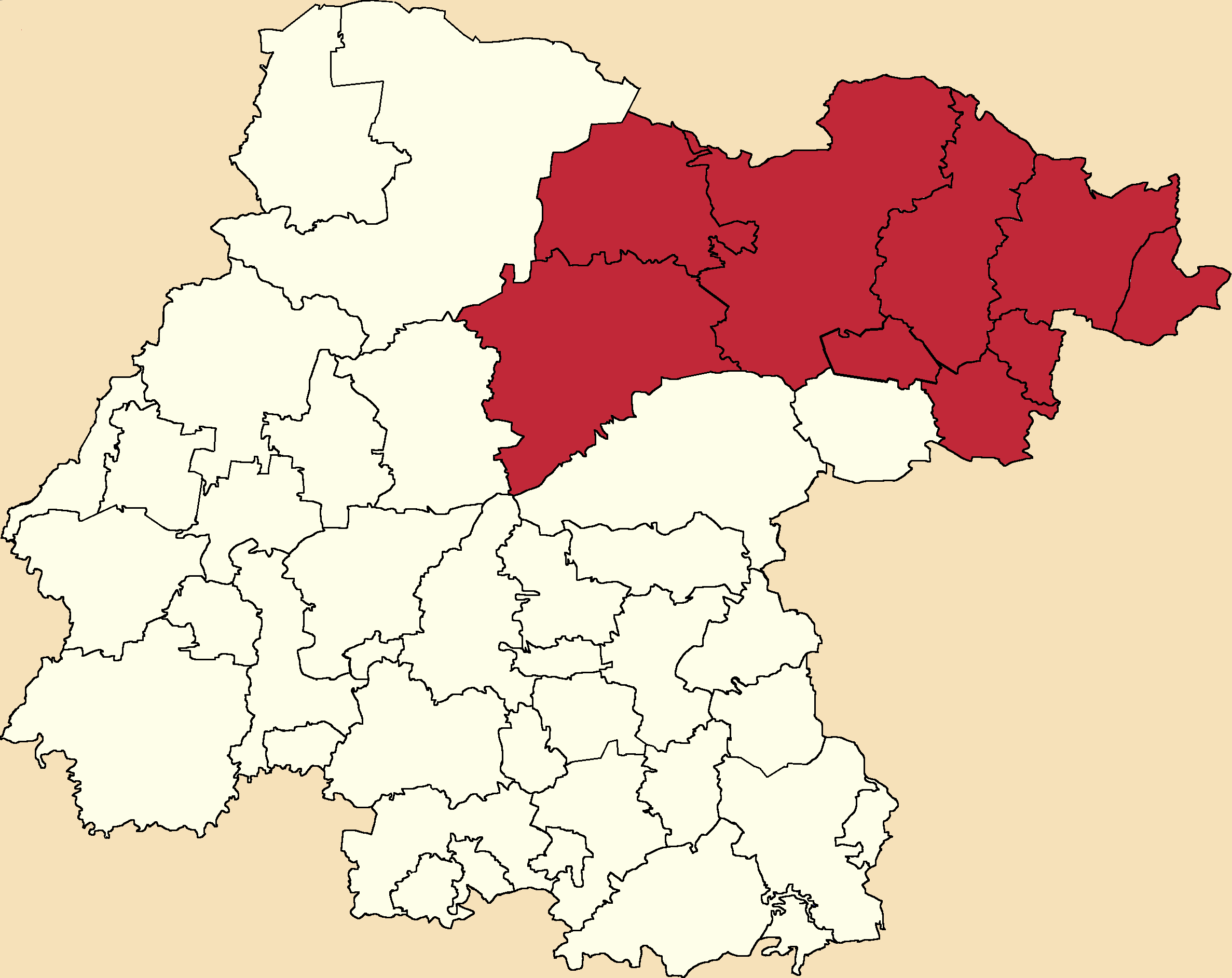
- 1st district since 2017

Incumbent
- Member: Luis Gerardo Sánchez
- Party: ▌Institutional Revolutionary Party
- Congress: 66th (2024–2027)

District
- State: Guanajuato
- Head town: San Luis de la Paz
- Coordinates: 21°18′N 100°31′W
- Covers: 8 municipalities: Atarjea, Doctor Mora, Dolores Hidalgo, San Luis de la Paz, Santa Catarina, Tierra Blanca, Victoria, Xichú
- PR region: Second
- Precincts: 190
- Population: 382,910 (2020 census)

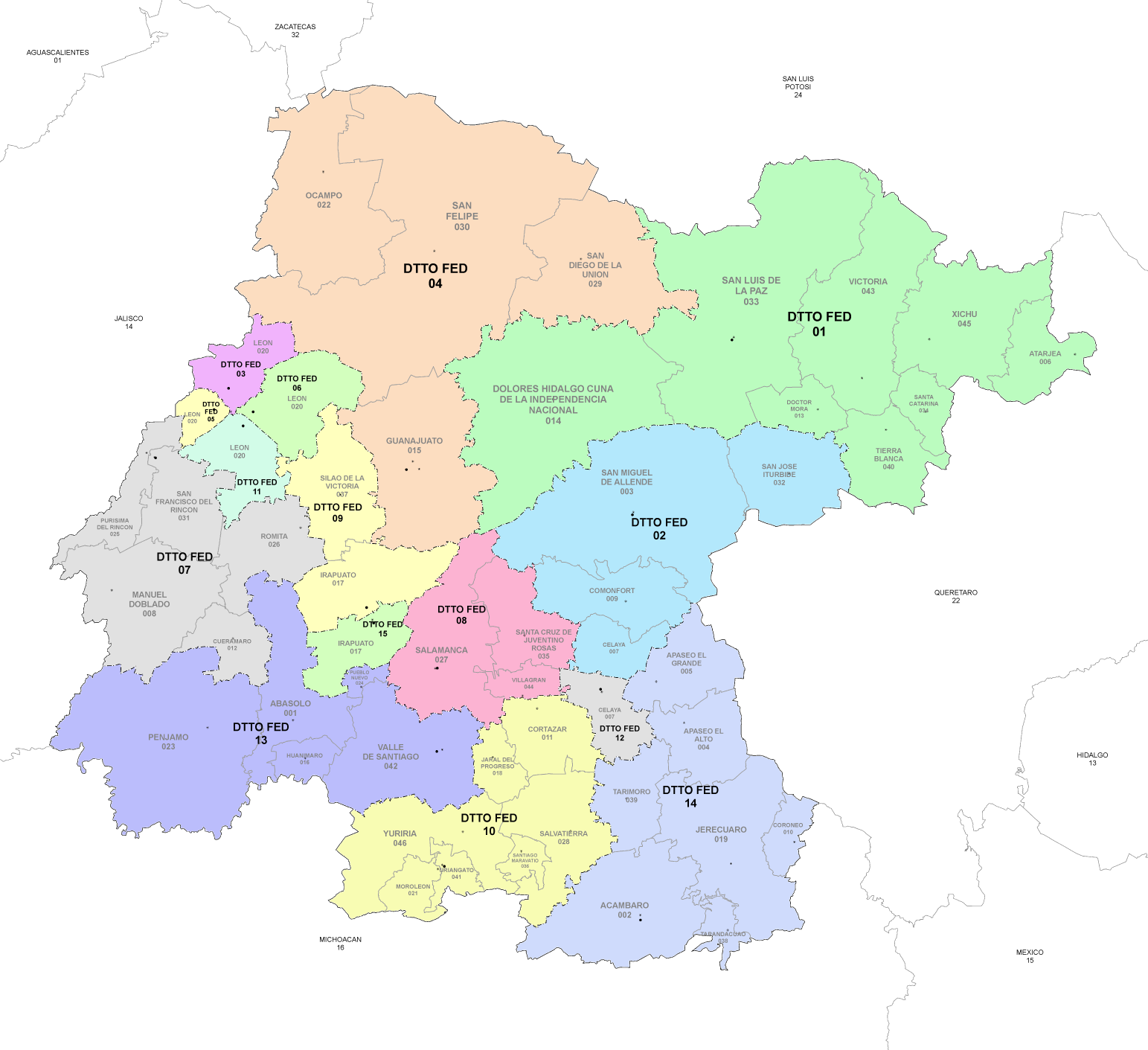
2023 districting scheme for Guanajuato

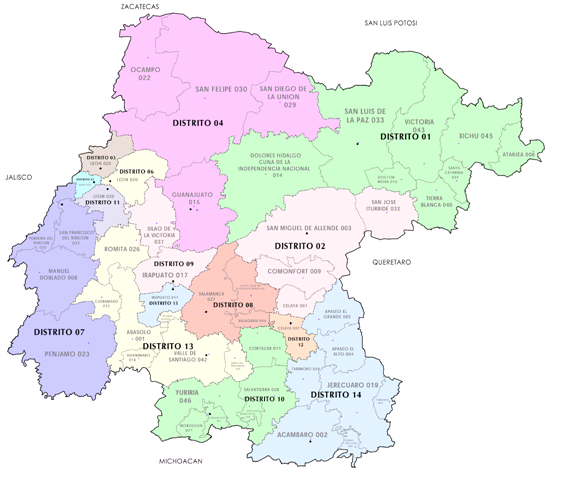
Guanajuato's districts in 2017–2022

The 1st federal electoral district of Guanajuato (Spanish: Distrito electoral federal 01 de Guanajuato) is one of the 300 electoral districts into which Mexico is divided for elections to the federal Chamber of Deputies and one of 15 such districts in the state of Guanajuato.

It elects one deputy to the lower house of Congress for each three-year legislative session by means of the first-past-the-post system. Votes cast in the district also count towards the calculation of proportional representation ("plurinominal") deputies elected from the second region.

The current member for the district, elected in the 2024 general election, is Luis Gerardo Sánchez Sánchez of the Institutional Revolutionary Party (PRI).

== District territory ==
Under the 2023 districting plan adopted by the National Electoral Institute (INE), which is to be used for the 2024, 2027 and 2030 federal elections, Guanajuato's 1st district covers the north-east of the state, along the border with San Luis Potosí and Querétaro, and comprises 190 electoral precincts (secciones electorales) across eight of the state's 46 municipalities:

- Atarjea, Doctor Mora, Dolores Hidalgo, San Luis de la Paz, Santa Catarina, Tierra Blanca, Victoria and Xichú.

The head town (cabecera distrital), where results from individual polling stations are gathered together and tallied, is the city of San Luis de la Paz. The district reported a population of 382,910 in the 2020 census.

== Previous districting schemes ==
Evolution of electoral district numbers
	1974	1978	1996	2005	2017	2023
Guanajuato	9	13	15	14	15	15
Chamber of Deputies	196	300				

2017–2022

Between 2017 and 2022, the 1st district had the same configuration as in the 2023 plan.

2005–2017

Under the 2005 plan, Guanajuato had only 14 districts. This district's head town was at San Luis de la Paz and it covered a slightly different group of eight municipalities in the north of the state:
- Atarjea, San Luis de la Paz, Santa Catarina, Victoria and Xichú, as in the later plans, plus Ocampo, San Diego de la Unión and San Felipe.

1996–2005

In the 1996 scheme, under which Guanajuato was assigned 15 seats, the district had its head town at Dolores Hidalgo and it comprised four municipalities:
- Dolores Hidalgo, Ocampo, San Diego de la Unión and San Felipe.

1978–1996

The districting scheme in force from 1978 to 1996 was the result of the 1977 electoral reforms, which increased the number of single-member seats in the Chamber of Deputies from 196 to 300. Under that plan, Guanajuato's seat allocation rose from 9 to 13. The 1st district's head town was at the state capital, the city of Guanajuato, and it covered three municipalities:
- Guanajuato, Romita and Silao.

== Deputies returned to Congress ==
(Mexico) National parties
- Current
- PAN
- PRI
- PT
- PVEM
- MC
- Morena
- PAZ
- Somos
- Defunct or local only
- PLM
- PNR
- PRM
- PNM
- PP
- PPS
- PARM
- PFCRN
- CON
- PANAL
- PSD
- PES
- PES
- PRD

Guanajuato's 1st district
Election	Deputy	Party	Term	Legislature
1916	Ramón Frausto		1916–1917	Constituent Congress of Querétaro
...
1976	Esteban Garaiz Izarra	Institutional Revolutionary Party	1976–1979	50th Congress
1979	Rafael Corrales Ayala	Institutional Revolutionary Party	1979–1982	51st Congress
1982	Enrique Fernández Martínez	Institutional Revolutionary Party	1982–1985	52nd Congress
1985	Néstor Raúl Luna Hernández	Institutional Revolutionary Party	1985–1988	53rd Congress
1988	Miguel Montes García	Institutional Revolutionary Party	1988–1991	54th Congress
1991	Francisco Agustín Arroyo Vieyra	Institutional Revolutionary Party	1991–1994	55th Congress
1994	Severiano Pérez Vázquez	Institutional Revolutionary Party	1994–1997	56th Congress
1997	Francisco Antonio Ordaz Hernández	Institutional Revolutionary Party	1997–2000	57th Congress
2000	Luis Gerardo Rubio Valdez	Institutional Revolutionary Party	2000–2003	58th Congress
2003	Alfonso Moreno Morán	National Action Party (Mexico)	2003–2006	59th Congress
2006	Francisco Javier Murillo Flores	National Action Party (Mexico)	2006–2009	60th Congress
2009	Juan Huerta Montero (Note: Huerta Montero died in an aviation accident on 3 September 2010 and was replaced for the remainder of his term by his alternate, Quintana Padilla.); Aránzazu Quintana Padilla	National Action Party (Mexico)	2009–2010; 2010–2012	61st Congress
2012	Petra Barrera Barrera	Institutional Revolutionary Party	2012–2015	62nd Congress
2015	Timoteo Villa Ramírez	Institutional Revolutionary Party	2015–2018	63rd Congress
2018	Ariel Rodríguez Vázquez	Citizens' Movement (Mexico)	2018–2021	64th Congress
2021	Berenice Montes Estrada	National Action Party (Mexico)	2021–2024	65th Congress
2024	Luis Gerardo Sánchez Sánchez	Institutional Revolutionary Party	2024–2027	66th Congress

== Presidential elections ==
Guanajuato's 1st district
Election	District won by	Party or coalition	%
2018	Ricardo Anaya Cortés	Por México al Frente	34.7635
2024	Claudia Sheinbaum Pardo	Sigamos Haciendo Historia	46.3519
