= TV4 (Guanajuato) =

Television network of the Mexican state of Guanajuato

- Country: Mexico
- Broadcast area: State of Guanajuato
- Headquarters: León

Ownership
- Owner: Unidad de Televisión del Estado de Guanajuato

History
- Founded: December 5, 1979
- Launched: September 15, 1982

Links
- Website: tvcuatro.com

TV4 is the state-owned public broadcaster serving the Mexican state of Guanajuato. It broadcasts on 30 total transmitters statewide and is operated by the Television Unit of Guanajuato (UTEG), which under its stated mission, provides educational programming, social and cultural television and healthy entertainment for children, youth and adults. It also airs programming from BBC, the Deutsche Welle, Canal Once and Canal 22.

TV4 is available statewide, covering 98% of the territory of Guanajuato in addition to statewide cable television carriage and satellite distribution via Mexicanal and Canal SUR.

In some form, TV4 programming reaches more than 3 million viewers both in Mexico and abroad, including in the United States.

== History ==
In December 1979, the state government and the Dirección General de Radio, Televisión y Cinematografía (RTC), then in charge of the Televisión Rural de México network, agreed that TRM programming and broadcasts would be regionalized to deliver information oriented specifically to address needs of the local population. The result was that in various states, TRM built regional opt-outs into its programming schedule.

Two years later, the first broadcasts through TRM's regional network provided local programming for one hour daily. This later increased as new infrastructure was constructed, with the first test broadcasts of channel 4 in 1983 and later supplemented by regional FM radio broadcasting (see XHJUA-FM).

In April 1983, Radio y Televisión de Guanajuato (Radio and Television of Guanajuato, RTG) was created as a state-supported organization to broadcast social, educational and cultural programming.

In 1999, the radio network was spun off and given to the University of Guanajuato. By then, it included stations in León, Guanajuato and San Miguel de Allende, all of which are now part of the university's radio network. The rest of the former RTG was then restructured, becoming in 2001 the Unidad de Televisión de Guanajuato (Guanajuato Television Unit or UTEG).

In the 2010s, TV4 transitioned to digital and high definition. The León transmitter was the first to convert to digital, receiving its authorization in September 2011. Others were authorized in the years leading up to the Mexican digital transition in 2015.

A reaward of all of TV4's concessions effective January 1, 2022, resulted in new call signs across the network.

== Programming ==
TV4 produces around 48 percent of its program output, which includes kids' shows, educational programming, local sporting events, and newscasts covering Guanajuato. It fills the remainder of its broadcast day with Deutsche Welle programs, as well as productions from the other state networks. TV4 also offers coverage of local cultural events such as the Festival Internacional Cervantino.

== Transmitters ==
TVCUATRO is available through a statewide network of repeaters located throughout Guanajuato. There are 27 main stations and a further three translators of XHCPDQ (formerly XHLEG), the León transmitter. TV4 uses virtual channel 4 in all areas.

RF	VC	Call sign	Location	ERP
35	4	XHCPAM-TDT	Acámbaro	0.6353 kW
24	4	XHCPAZ-TDT	Atarjea	.12 kW
30	4	XHCPBE-TDT	Celaya	29.9 kW
25	4	XHCPBG-TDT	Comonfort	.15 kW
24	4	XHCPBH-TDT	Coroneo	.4776 kW
24	4	XHCPDB-TDT	Doctor Mora	.029 kW
35	4	XHCPDK-TDT	Dolores Hidalgo	1.032 kW
35	4	XHCPDL-TDT	Guanajuato	0.641 kW
35	4	XHCPDM-TDT	Huanímaro	.029 kW
31	4	XHCPDN-TDT	Jerécuaro	.03228 kW
35	4	XHCPNO-TDT	Juventino Rosas	.29 kW
25	4	XHCPDQ-TDT	León; Ciudad Manuel Doblado; Moroleón; Yuriria	336 kW.420 kW; 1.618 kW; 1.127 kW
26	4	XHCPDR-TDT	Ocampo	0.05 kW
21	4	XHCPDS-TDT	Pénjamo	.5 kW
31	4	XHCPDT-TDT	Salvatierra	0.215 kW
30	4	XHCPDU-TDT	San Diego de la Unión	1 kW
33	4	XHCPDV-TDT	San Felipe	.4356 kW
30	4	XHCPDW-TDT	San José Iturbide	1.076 kW
25	4	XHCPDX-TDT	San Luis de la Paz	.29 kW
24	4	XHCPDY-TDT	San Miguel de Allende	3.8 kW
30	4	XHCPDZ-TDT	Santa Catarina	.2512 kW
25	4	XHCPEA-TDT	Santiago Maravatio	.05 kW
21	4	XHCPEB-TDT	Tarandacuao	.1452 kW
25	4	XHCPEC-TDT	Tarimoro	.29 kW
23	4	XHCPED-TDT	Tierra Blanca	.1264 kW
27	4	XHCPEE-TDT	Victoria	.029 kW
22	4	XHCPEF-TDT	Xichu	.3 kW

While all TV4 transmitters held authorizations at the time to broadcast in digital, and the León and Celaya transmitters were the first to broadcast as such, the León transmitter was the only one that shut off its analog signal on December 11, 2015.

In March 2018, in order to facilitate the repacking of TV services out of the 600 MHz band (channels 38-51), ten transmitters of TV4 were assigned new channels for continued digital operations. XHGCO, XHLEG, and XHGTA were assigned channel 25; XHGJI and XHGSC were assigned channel 30; and XHGAC, XHDLG, XHATO, XHGHU, and XHGJR were assigned channel 35.

TV4 programming is available to Guanajuatense audiences abroad via Mexicanal and Canal Sur México; in the US, broadcasts are also available from DirecTV and though multicasting.

=== Digital subchannels ===
All TV4 transmitters are multiplexed, carrying two subchannels with programming primarily consisting of TV4 repeats: TV4 Media on channel 4.2 and TV4 Expresa on channel 4.3.
