= 9th federal electoral district of Guanajuato =

Federal electoral district of Mexico

Guanajuato's 9th
- Electoral district of the Chamber of Deputies of Mexico

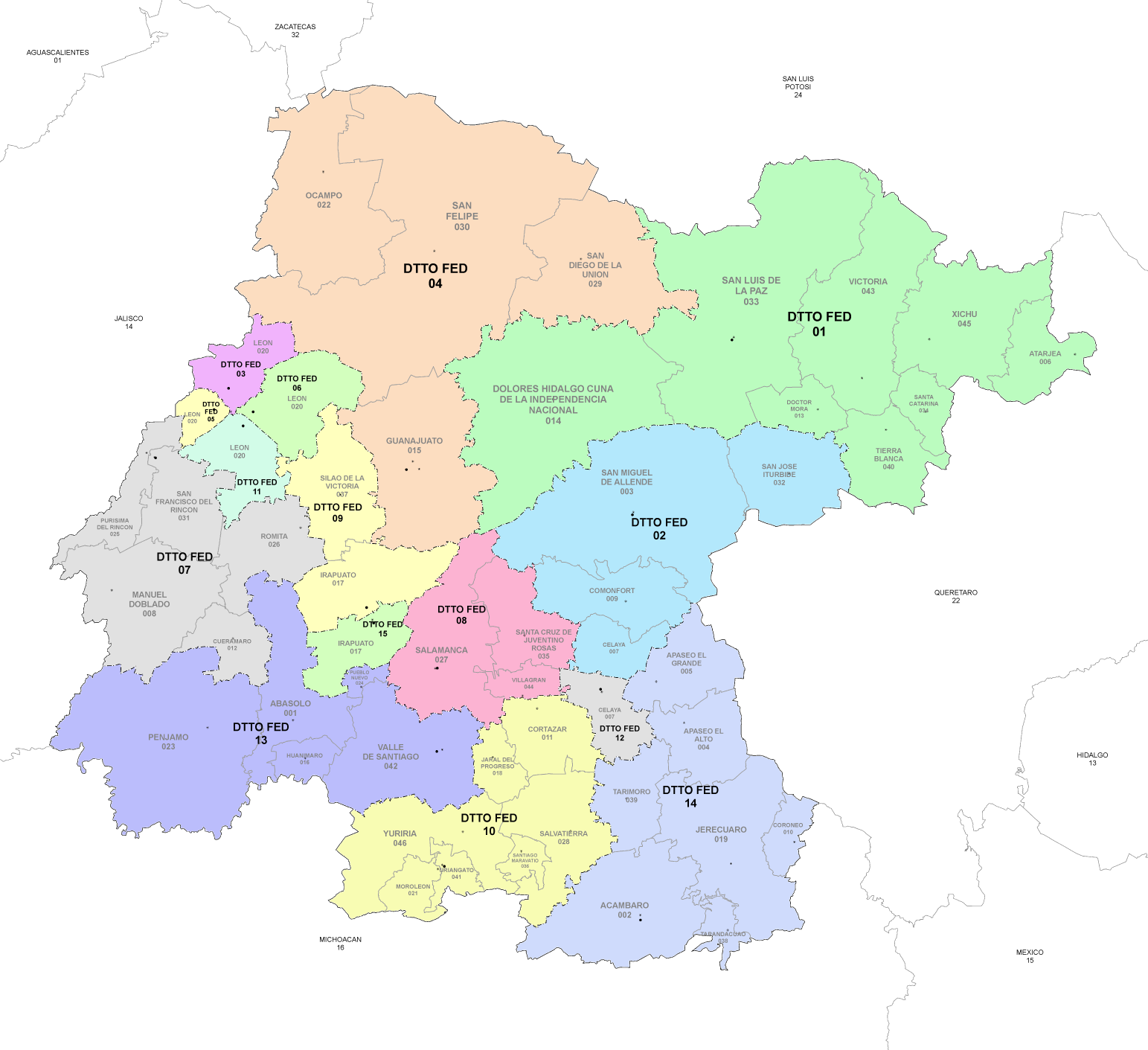
- 9th district since 2023

Incumbent
- Member: Diego Rodríguez Barroso
- Party: ▌National Action Party
- Congress: 66th (2024–2027)

District
- State: Guanajuato
- Head town: Irapuato
- Coordinates: 20°40′N 101°21′W
- Covers: Irapuato (part), Silao
- PR region: Second
- Precincts: 156
- Population: 399,453 (2020 census)

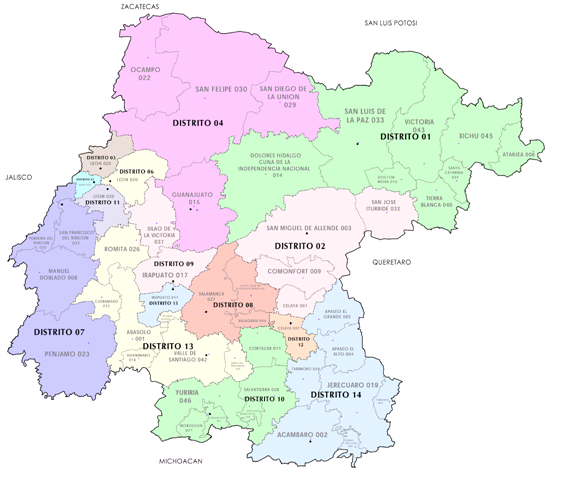
Guanajuato's districts in 2017–2022

The 9th federal electoral district of Guanajuato (Spanish: Distrito electoral federal 09 de Guanajuato) is one of the 300 electoral districts into which Mexico is divided for elections to the federal Chamber of Deputies and one of 15 such districts in the state of Guanajuato.

It elects one deputy to the lower house of Congress for each three-year legislative session by means of the first-past-the-post system. Votes cast in the district also count towards the calculation of proportional representation ("plurinominal") deputies elected from the second region.

The current member for the district, elected in the 2024 general election, is Diego Ángel Rodríguez Barroso of the National Action Party (PAN).

== District territory ==
Under the 2023 districting plan adopted by the National Electoral Institute (INE), which is to be used for the 2024, 2027 and 2030 federal elections, the 9th district is located in the central part of Guanajuato and covers 156 electoral precincts (secciones electorales) across two of the state's 46 municipalities:

- 78 precincts in the north of Irapuato and the entirety of Silao.

The head town (cabecera distrital), where results from individual polling stations are gathered together and tallied, is the city of Irapuato. The district reported a population of 399,453 in the 2020 census.

== Previous districting schemes ==
Evolution of electoral district numbers
	1974	1978	1996	2005	2017	2023
Guanajuato	9	13	15	14	15	15
Chamber of Deputies	196	300				

2017–2022

Between 2017 and 2022, the 9th district's head town was at Irapuato and it covered 70 precincts in the north of the municipality, together with the whole of Silao.

2005–2017

Under the 2005 plan, Guanajuato had only 14 districts. This district's head town was at Irapuato and it covered 202 precincts in the west of the municipality. (Note: The rest of the municipality was assigned to the 4th district.)

1996–2005

In the 1996 scheme, under which Guanajuato was assigned 15 seats, the district had its head town at Irapuato and it comprised the whole of the municipality.

1978–1996

The districting scheme in force from 1978 to 1996 was the result of the 1977 electoral reforms, which increased the number of single-member seats in the Chamber of Deputies from 196 to 300. Under that plan, Guanajuato's seat allocation rose from 9 to 13. The 9th district's head town was at San Miguel de Allende and it covered 10 municipalities in the north-east of the state:
- Allende, Atarjea, Doctor Mora, San José Iturbide, San Luis de la Paz, Santa Catarina, Santa Cruz de Juventino Rosas, Tierra Blanca, Victoria and Xichú.

== Deputies returned to Congress ==
(Mexico) National parties
- Current
- PAN
- PRI
- PT
- PVEM
- MC
- Morena
- PAZ
- Somos
- Defunct or local only
- PLM
- PNR
- PRM
- PNM
- PP
- PPS
- PARM
- PFCRN
- CON
- PANAL
- PSD
- PES
- PES
- PRD

Guanajuato's 9th district
Election	Deputy	Party	Term	Legislature
1916	Manuel G. Aranda		1916–1917	Constituent Congress of Querétaro
...
The 9th district was suspended between 1943 and 1961
1961	Enrique Rangel Meléndez	Institutional Revolutionary Party	1961–1964	45th Congress
1964	Antonio Vázquez Pérez	Institutional Revolutionary Party	1964–1967	46th Congress
1967	Enrique Rangel Meléndez	Institutional Revolutionary Party	1967–1970	47th Congress
1970	Luis Humberto Ducoing Gamba	Institutional Revolutionary Party	1970–1973	48th Congress
1973	José Mendoza Lugo	Institutional Revolutionary Party	1973–1976	49th Congress
1976	Donaciano Luna Hernández	Institutional Revolutionary Party	1976–1979	50th Congress
1979	Guadalupe Rivera Marín	Institutional Revolutionary Party	1979–1982	51st Congress
1982	Salvador Rocha Díaz	Institutional Revolutionary Party	1982–1985	52nd Congress
1985	María Luisa Mendoza Romero	Institutional Revolutionary Party	1985–1988	53rd Congress
1988	María Esther Valiente Govea	Institutional Revolutionary Party	1988–1991	54th Congress
1991	Juan Ignacio Torres Landa García	Institutional Revolutionary Party	1991–1994	55th Congress
1994	Jaime Martínez Tapia	Institutional Revolutionary Party	1994–1997	56th Congress
1997	José Ricardo Ortiz Gutiérrez	National Action Party (Mexico)	1997–2000	57th Congress
2000	Francisco Javier Chico Goerne	National Action Party (Mexico)	2000–2003	58th Congress
2003	Consuelo Camarena Gómez	National Action Party (Mexico)	2003–2006	59th Congress
2006	Marcela Cuen Garibi	National Action Party (Mexico)	2006–2009	60th Congress
2009	Sixto Alfonso Zetina Soto	National Action Party (Mexico)	2009–2012	61st Congress
2012	Alejandro Rangel Segovia	Institutional Revolutionary Party	2012–2015	62nd Congress
2015	Yulma Rocha Aguilar	Institutional Revolutionary Party	2015–2018	63rd Congress
2018	Janet Melanie Murillo Chávez	National Action Party (Mexico)	2018–2021	64th Congress
2021	Jorge Alberto Romero Vázquez (Note: Romero Vázquez never took the oath of office. His alternate, Tovar Vargas, served in his stead throughout the congressional session.); José Salvador Tovar Vargas	National Action Party (Mexico)	— 2021–2024	65th Congress
2024	Diego Ángel Rodríguez Barroso	National Action Party (Mexico)	2024–2027	66th Congress

== Presidential elections ==
Guanajuato's 9th district
Election	District won by	Party or coalition	%
2018	Ricardo Anaya Cortés	Por México al Frente	39.2269
2024	Claudia Sheinbaum Pardo	Sigamos Haciendo Historia	47.3866
