= Same-sex marriage in Guanajuato =

Same-sex marriage has been legal in Guanajuato since 20 December 2021. That day, the Secretary General of Government, Libia García Muñoz Ledo, issued an official directive addressed to officials of the state civil registry that, effective immediately, same-sex couples can marry in the state. Guanajuato was the 23rd Mexican state to legalize same-sex marriage. Legislation officially codifying same-sex marriage into state law was passed by the Congress of Guanajuato on 4 December 2025, and was subsequently signed by Governor Muñoz Ledo. It was published in the official state gazette on 18 December, and took effect the following day.

== Legal history ==
=== Background ===
The Supreme Court of Justice of the Nation ruled on 12 June 2015 that state bans on same-sex marriage are unconstitutional nationwide. The court's ruling is considered a "jurisprudential thesis" and did not invalidate state laws, meaning that same-sex couples denied the right to marry would still have to seek individual amparos in court. The ruling standardized the procedures for judges and courts throughout Mexico to approve all applications for same-sex marriages and made the approval mandatory. Specifically, the court ruled that bans on same-sex marriage violate Articles 1 and 4 of the Constitution of Mexico. Article 1 of the Constitution states:

Any form of discrimination, based on ethnic or national origin, gender, age, disabilities, social status, medical conditions, religion, opinions, sexual orientation, marital status, or any other form, which violates the human dignity or seeks to annul or diminish the rights and freedoms of the people, is prohibited. (Note: In some official and indigenous languages of Guanajuato: Spanish: Queda prohibida toda discriminación motivada por origen étnico o nacional, el género, la edad, las discapacidades, la condición social, las condiciones de salud, la religión, las opiniones, las preferencias sexuales, el estado civil o cualquier otra que atente contra la dignidad humana y tenga por objeto anular o menoscabar los derechos y libertades de las personas.; Otomi: Hingi tsa da t’utsa ya jä’i num’u ngu ra mengu ka ya hnini hñätho, ne ha ra ñ’oho ua ra m’ehñä, ra jeya gä mets’i, ha nxotho ra jä’i, hä ua hin’ä bojä, ha hingi dathi, ne te ma nijä pa, xa nthäti ua hin’ä ne ha ua ma n’a ngu embi t’uni ra m’ui gä mu’i di thegi di mu’i ra n’yo ya jä’i.; Chichimeca Jonaz: Sahar urir sujarme ki urir kabe’ ndi eni e’ir o me kabe’ ndi unhi’ ugi’, iru o me mani, sapha ndi kane ukhar, kabe’ ndi marhe tawe, kabe’ ndi ebeh, uts’a ndi ukhar, kane nabi’ ndi ukhɇ’r, kabe’ Kuri ewa, kabe’ ndi endɇ uwe’ ukhar, sikha itehr o ume kit’a rinhi ndi pa kaneme paja utsab ki ki’i randi ur’u rinhi ndi kini ubo’ ukhar paja ratsab.)

On 2 September 2013, a lesbian couple was denied a marriage license by the civil registry office in León. They challenged the denial in federal court. Attorneys representing the civil registry argued that state law defined marriage as "the union of a man and a woman" and as such the couple could not marry, whereas the couple's attorneys argued that the ban was unconstitutional under the Constitution of Mexico. A judge ruled in favor of the couple on 18 September 2013 and granted them the right to marry. The couple, who remained anonymous, married on 19 March 2014, becoming the first same-sex couple to do so in Guanajuato. On 4 March 2014, a local deputy from the Institutional Revolutionary Party (PRI) said he would help a group of same-sex couples from León and Silao file amparos in court. An amparo for thirty couples from León was filed two weeks later. A further amparo was filed in Irapuato for several more couples later that year. On 25 November 2014, the First District Court ruled in favor of a same-sex couple who sought to marry. The state did not appeal, and the couple married in January 2015. In April 2016, officials from the civil registry said that nine same-sex couples had married in the state by that time. A tenth amparo was granted to a same-sex couple from Salamanca in August 2016. By May 2018, 43 amparos had been granted in the state.

=== Early bills ===
On 21 February 2014, the Party of the Democratic Revolution (PRD) introduced a bill to the Congress of Guanajuato to amend the Civil Code to legalize same-sex marriage. The measure was endorsed by the Institutional Revolutionary Party, but on 13 April 2015 the Justice Committee of Congress with a majority from the state's ruling National Action Party (PAN) voted 3–2 to shelve the bill citing PAN's objection to same-sex unions.

On 29 April 2016, the Guanajuato Municipal Council voted unanimously to pass a resolution allowing a lesbian couple to marry in Guanajuato. The council also urged Governor Miguel Márquez Márquez to introduce legislation to legalize same-sex marriage. In October 2018, PRD Deputy Isidoro Bazaldúa Lugo introduced a same-sex marriage bill to Congress. Another bill to legalize same-sex marriage was introduced following the 2021 legislative elections. However, both measures stalled and were not voted on. On 27 October 2022, Deputy David Martínez Mendizábal from the National Regeneration Movement (MORENA) introduced a bill to codify same-sex marriage in the Civil Code. Martínez Mendizábal said he introduced the bill because "the legal framework of our [state] remains discriminatory, because it still does not recognize the right to gender identity, equal marriage, and does not prohibit conversion therapies, among others."

=== Directive and passage of legislation in 2025 ===
On 20 December 2021, citing jurisprudence established by the Supreme Court of Justice of the Nation, Libia García Muñoz Ledo, the Secretary General of Government (Secretaría de Gobierno), issued an official directive, "Directive 2261/2021", addressed to all civil registry officials in Guanajuato that, effective immediately, same-sex couples can marry in the state without the further need of their first obtaining a judicial amparo. The directive states: "As of this date and thereafter, the right of all people, without discrimination due to their sexual preference, to marry in our Civil Registry offices is recognized." Activist Juan Pablo Delgado, a founding member of the LGBT advocacy group Free León (León Libre), welcomed the measure, saying, "Today Guanajuato joins the list of states that allow equal marriage. While the need to reform local law continues, a huge step is taken in building a society that offers equal conditions for all people. Long live diversity." Guanajuato's reputation as one of the most conservative states in Mexico was also cause for widespread media coverage that followed García Muñoz's announcement. The first same-sex marriage performed under the new directive took place on 10 January 2022 in Irapuato. On 26 January 2022, Governor Diego Sinhué Rodríguez Vallejo issued an executive decree repealing article 72 of the civil registry regulations, which had established as a requisite for marriage that the partners be of the opposite sex. The decree entered into effect that same day. However, the directive technically lapsed upon the end of Rodríguez Vallejo's governorship on 26 September 2024. However, the state government confirmed the following month that since the civil registry regulations were modified same-sex marriage would remain legal in Guanajuato. The Secretary General of Government, Jorge Jiménez Lona, stated that since the regulations were changed "no circular is required, nothing special is required".

On 11 November 2025, the Justice Commission of the Congress of Guanajuato voted 3–2 to pass a bill officially codifying same-sex marriage into state law. Deputy Rolando Alcántar Rojas from the conservative National Action Party supported the measure, and stated that attempts to replace same-sex marriage with civil unions would likely be struck down by the Supreme Court as unconstitutional. A final vote took place on 4 December, when the bill passed 25–9. The legislation was signed by Governor Muñoz Ledo, and published in the official state gazette on 18 December. It took effect the following day. Article 144 of the Civil Code now reads: Marriage is the free union of two people, whose purpose is to establish a shared life in which the spouses provide each other with respect, equality, and mutual support. (Note: Spanish: Matrimonio es la unión libre de dos personas, que tiene como objeto realizar una comunidad de vida, en la que los cónyuges se procuran respeto, igualdad y ayuda mutua.)

4 December 2025 vote in the Congress
Party	Voted for	Voted against	Abstained	Absent (Did not vote)
National Action Party	7: Jorge Espadas Galván; Ana Esquivel Arrona; Jesús Hernández Hernández; Aldo Márquez Becerra; Roberto Terán Ramos; José Tovar Vargas; Víctor Zanella Huerta	8: Rolando Alcántar Rojas; Susana Bermúdez Cano; José Bermúdez Méndez; Karol González Márquez; Noemí Márquez Márquez; María Ortiz Mantilla; Yesenia Rojas Cervantes; Juan Romero Hicks	–	1: Angélica Casillas Martínez
National Regeneration Movement	11: Hades Aguilar Castillo; Maribel Aguilar González; Plásida Calzada Velázquez; Antonio Chaurand Sorzano; Luis Ferro Baeza; María García Oliveros; David Martínez Mendizábal; Ernesto Millán Soberanes; Martha Moreno Valencia; Carlos Ramos Sotomayor; Miriam Reyes Carmona	–	–	–
Institutional Revolutionary Party	1: Alejandro Arias Ávila	1: Rocío Cervantes Barba	–	1: Ruth Tiscareño Agoitia
Citizens' Movement	2: Rodrigo González Zaragoza; Sandra Pedroza Orozco	–	–	–
Ecologist Green Party of Mexico	2: Sergio Contreras Guerrero; Luz Mendo González	–	–	–
Labor Party	1: Carolina León Medina	–	–	–
Party of the Democratic Revolution	1: María Gómez Enríquez	–	–	–
Total	25	9	0	2
Total	69.4%	25.0%	0.0%	5.6%

== Marriage statistics ==
The following table shows the number of same-sex marriages performed in Guanajuato since 2021 as reported by the National Institute of Statistics and Geography. In November 2022, the civil registry reported that more than 200 same-sex marriages had been performed in Guanajuato since legalization, with most being performed in León (54), Irapuato (36), and Guanajuato (20). 69% of these marriages were between two women. In total, at least one same-sex marriage had taken place in 30 of the state's 46 municipalities. The 16 municipalities where no same-sex marriage had occurred were Abasolo, Atarjea, Coroneo, Doctor Mora, Ocampo, Pueblo Nuevo, Romita, Salvatierra, San Diego de la Unión, Santa Catarina, Santiago Maravatío, Tarandacuao, Tierra Blanca, Victoria, Xichú, and Yuriria.

Number of marriages performed in Guanajuato
Year	Same-sex			Opposite-sex	Total	% same-sex
Year	Female	Male	Total	Opposite-sex	Total	% same-sex
2021	16	12	28	28,408	28,436	0.01%
2022	195	77	272	30,880	31,145	0.87%
2023	181	80	261	28,518	28,779	0.91%
2024	187	92	279	28,908	29,187	0.96%

== Public opinion ==
According to a 2018 survey by the National Institute of Statistics and Geography, 39% of the Guanajuato public opposed same-sex marriage.

== See also ==
- Same-sex marriage in Mexico
- LGBT rights in Mexico
