= Sierra Gorda Territory =

Mexican federal territory (1853–1857)

Sierra Gorda Territory Territorio de Sierra Gorda
- Territory of Mexico
- 1853–1857
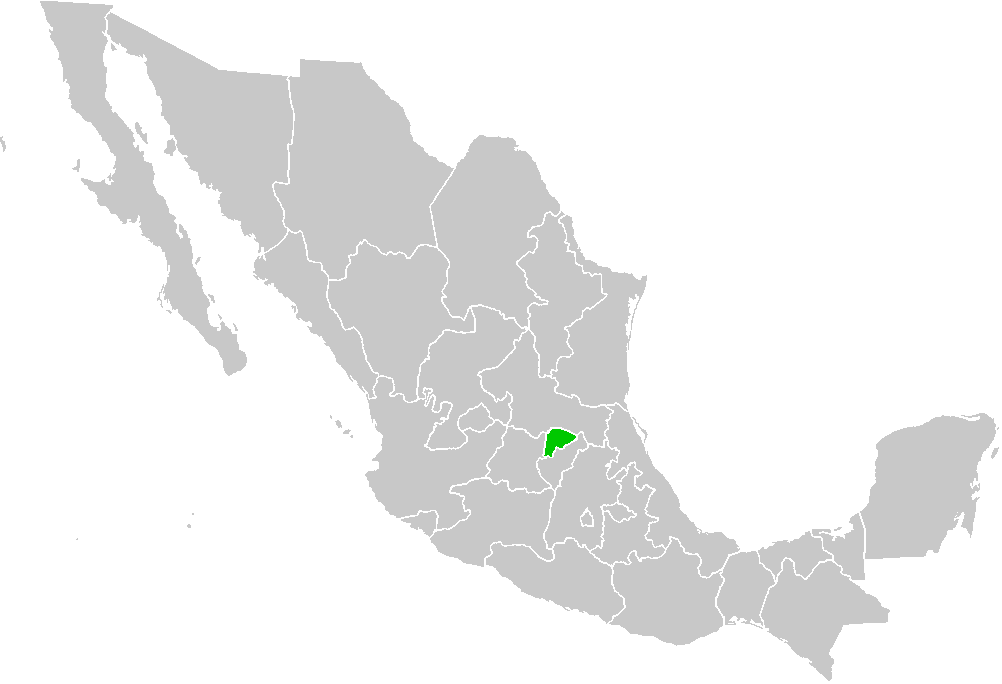
- Location of the Sierra Gorda Territory (green) in Mexico.
- Capital: San Luis de la Paz
- Government
  - Type: Territory of Mexico
- History
  - Established: 1 December 1853
  - Dissolution: 1857

The Sierra Gorda Territory (Spanish: Territorio de Sierra Gorda) was a federal territory of Mexico. It existed between 1853 and 1857.

== History ==
On 1 December 1853, the territory was established by President Antonio López de Santa Anna, and consisted of the Sierra Gorda, which forms part of the Sierra Madre Oriental. The states of Querétaro, San Luis Potosí, and Guanajuato ceded area for the creation of the territory. The capital was San Luis de la Paz, and comprised the municipalities of San José Iturbide, Victoria, Santa Catarina, Tierra Blanca, Xichú, Atarjea, San Ciro de Acosta, Tierranueva and San Luis de la Paz.

With the proclamation of the Constitution of 1857, two years after the fall of Santa Anna, the territory was dissolved.
