= 4th federal electoral district of Guanajuato =

Federal electoral district of Mexico

Guanajuato's 4th
- Electoral district of the Chamber of Deputies of Mexico

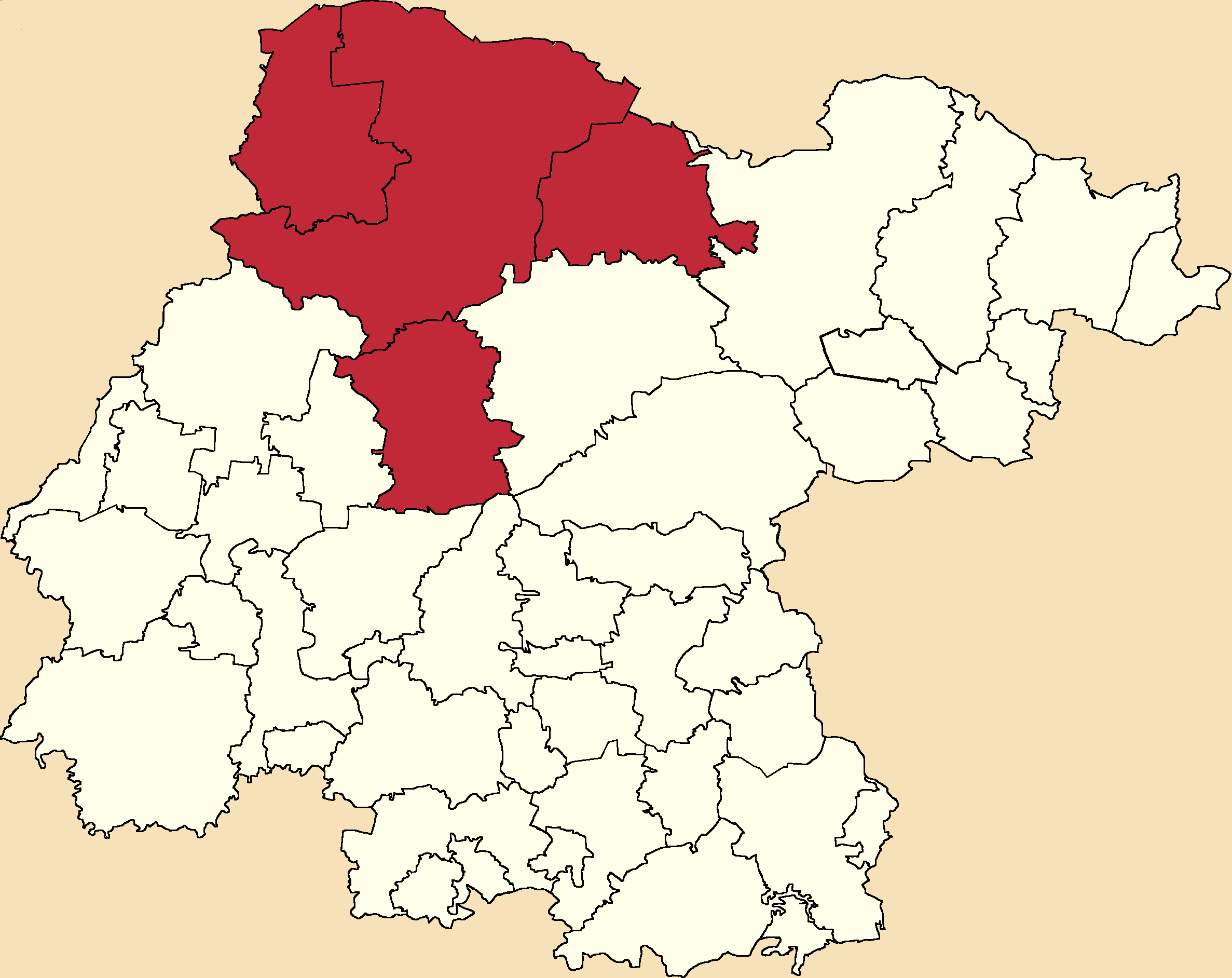
- 4th district since 2017

Incumbent
- Member: Francisco Javier Estrada
- Party: ▌Morena
- Congress: 66th (2024–2027)

District
- State: Guanajuato
- Head town: Guanajuato
- Coordinates: 21°01′N 101°15′W
- Covers: 4 municipalities: Guanajuato, Ocampo, San Diego de la Unión, San Felipe
- PR region: Second
- Precincts: 219
- Population: 380,060 (2020 census)

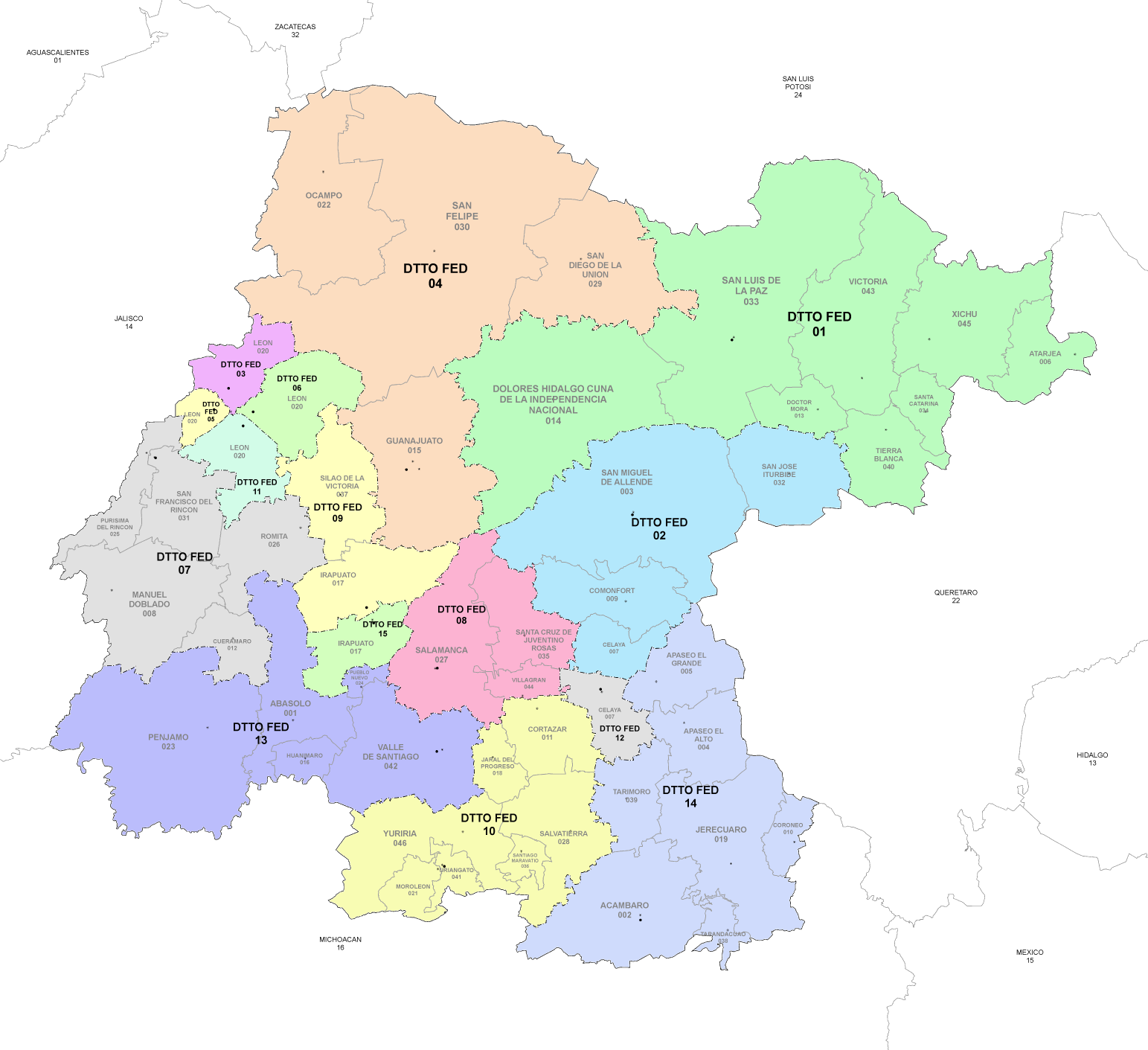
2023 districting scheme for Guanajuato

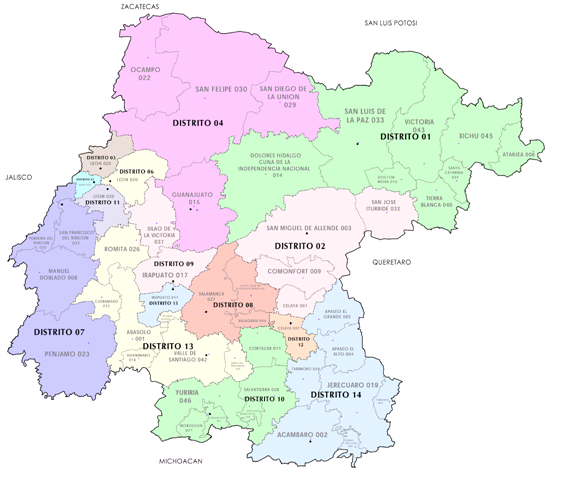
Guanajuato's districts in 2017–2022

The 4th federal electoral district of Guanajuato (Spanish: Distrito electoral federal 04 de Guanajuato) is one of the 300 electoral districts into which Mexico is divided for elections to the federal Chamber of Deputies and one of 15 such districts in the state of Guanajuato.

It elects one deputy to the lower house of Congress for each three-year legislative session by means of the first-past-the-post system. Votes cast in the district also count towards the calculation of proportional representation ("plurinominal") deputies elected from the second region.

The current member for the district, elected in the 2024 general election, is Francisco Javier Estrada Domínguez of the National Regeneration Movement (Morena).

== District territory ==
Under the 2023 districting plan adopted by the National Electoral Institute (INE), which is to be used for the 2024, 2027 and 2030 federal elections, Guanajuato's 4th district covers 219 electoral precincts (secciones electorales) across four of the state's 46 municipalities:

- Guanajuato, Ocampo, San Diego de la Unión and San Felipe.

The head town (cabecera distrital), where results from individual polling stations are gathered together and tallied, is the state capital, the city of Guanajuato. The district reported a population of 380,060 in the 2020 census.

== Previous districting schemes ==
Evolution of electoral district numbers
	1974	1978	1996	2005	2017	2023
Guanajuato	9	13	15	14	15	15
Chamber of Deputies	196	300				

2017–2022

Between 2017 and 2022, the 4th district had the same configuration as in the 2023 plan.

2005–2017

Under the 2005 plan, Guanajuato had only 14 districts. This district's head town was the state capital and it covered three municipalities:
- Guanajuato and Dolores Hidalgo in their entirety, plus 47 precincts in the north-east of Irapuato. (Note: The bulk of Irapuato was assigned to the 9th district.)

1996–2005

In the 1996 scheme, under which Guanajuato was assigned 15 seats, the district had its head town at Guanajuato and it comprised two municipalities in their entirety:
- Guanajuato and Silao.

1978–1996

The districting scheme in force from 1978 to 1996 was the result of the 1977 electoral reforms, which increased the number of single-member seats in the Chamber of Deputies from 196 to 300. Under that plan, Guanajuato's seat allocation rose from 9 to 13. The 4th district covered the whole of the municipality of Irapuato.

== Deputies returned to Congress ==
(Mexico) National parties
- Current
- PAN
- PRI
- PT
- PVEM
- MC
- Morena
- PAZ
- Somos
- Defunct or local only
- PLM
- PNR
- PRM
- PNM
- PP
- PPS
- PARM
- PFCRN
- CON
- PANAL
- PSD
- PES
- PES
- PRD

Guanajuato's 4th district
Election	Deputy	Party	Term	Legislature
1916	Jesús López Lira		1916–1917	Constituent Congress of Querétaro
...
1976	Miguel Montes García	Institutional Revolutionary Party	1976–1979	50th Congress
1979	Martín Aureliano Montaño Arteaga	Institutional Revolutionary Party	1979–1982	51st Congress
1982	Luis Vaquera García	Institutional Revolutionary Party	1982–1985	52nd Congress
1985	Jesús Gutiérrez Segoviano	Institutional Revolutionary Party	1985–1988	53rd Congress
1988	Antonio del Río Abaunza	Institutional Revolutionary Party	1988–1991	54th Congress
1991	Francisco Javier Alvarado Arreguín	Institutional Revolutionary Party	1991–1994	55th Congress
1994	Humberto Meza Galván	Institutional Revolutionary Party	1994–1997	56th Congress
1997	Francisco Agustín Arroyo Vieyra	Institutional Revolutionary Party	1997–2000	57th Congress
2000	Clemente Padilla Silva (Note: Originally elected for the PAN, Padilla Silva switched allegiance to the PRD on 15 April 2003.)	National Action Party (Mexico) Party of the Democratic Revolution	2000–2003	58th Congress
2003	Francisco Agustín Arroyo Vieyra	Institutional Revolutionary Party	2003–2006	59th Congress
2006	Margarita Arenas Guzmán	National Action Party (Mexico)	2006–2009	60th Congress
2009	Ruth Esperanza Lugo Martínez	National Action Party (Mexico)	2009–2012	61st Congress
2012	María Esther Garza Moreno	Institutional Revolutionary Party	2012–2015	62nd Congress
2015	Erika Lorena Arroyo Bello	Institutional Revolutionary Party	2015–2018	63rd Congress
2018	Juan Carlos Romero Hicks	National Action Party (Mexico)	2018–2021	64th Congress
2021	Juan Carlos Romero Hicks	National Action Party (Mexico)	2021–2024	65th Congress
2024	Francisco Javier Estrada Domínguez	National Regeneration Movement	2024–2027	66th Congress

== Presidential elections ==
Guanajuato's 4th district
Election	District won by	Party or coalition	%
2018	Ricardo Anaya Cortés	Por México al Frente	35.7299
2024	Claudia Sheinbaum Pardo	Sigamos Haciendo Historia	46.4311
