= WCSN-LD =

Television station in Columbus, Ohio

- Columbus, Ohio; United States
- Channels: Digital: 26 (UHF); Virtual: 32

Programming
- Affiliations: see § Subchannels

Ownership
- Owner: Word Broadcasting Network, Inc.

History
- First air date: March 24, 2007
- Former channel numbers: Analog: 32 (UHF); Digital: 33 (UHF, 2010–2020)
- Former affiliations: Local sports (2007–August 2008); Dark (August–September 2008); Infomercials (September 2008–2009); Azteca América (2009–2010)
- Call sign meaning: Columbus Sports Network (former programming)

Technical information
- Licensing authority: FCC
- Facility ID: 167758
- Class: LD
- ERP: 15 kW
- HAAT: 144.7 m (475 ft)
- Transmitter coordinates: 40°1′2″N 83°1′11″W

Links
- Public license information: LMS

WCSN-LD (channel 32) is a low-power television station in Columbus, Ohio, United States. The station is owned by Word Broadcasting Network.

== History ==
WCSN was launched on March 24, 2007, as the Columbus Sports Network (CSN), Central Ohio's first and only continuous all-sports television station, broadcasting events, features, highlights and news on professional, collegiate, scholastic and amateur sports teams in the area. The first-ever telecast on CSN was an Arena Football matchup between the Columbus Destroyers and the Chicago Rush; the Destroyers lost to the Rush, 55–47. While under the ownership of United Media Acquisitions and prior to ceasing local original programming, WCSN was carried on cable television systems in the market; Insight Communications had it on Channels 78 and 524, and WOW! had it on channel 97. This carriage was based on the station's original incarnation as an all-sports station, and included a channel on Time Warner Cable.

CSN planned to broadcast approximately 400 live events each year, including Columbus Motor Speedway, Columbus Crew, Columbus Destroyers (home games), Columbus Clippers (select games), minor Ohio State University sports (including baseball, volleyball, lacrosse, and tennis), college lacrosse and baseball from universities from the OAC and NCAC, high schools from the OHSAA, Canadian football, and various other events.

CSN launched a nightly 30-minute show called Sports Columbus on December 21, 2007. It spotlighted local sports highlights, news, and features of the day from Central Ohio. The show was co-anchored by Ray Crawford and Dionne Miller. Sports Columbus ran live at 10 p.m. Monday through Friday, with scheduled rebroadcasts the following day.

On June 6, 2008, The Columbus Dispatch reported that the production of programming had ended and that the business model was being reviewed. WCSN left the air completely in August 2008; by September 8, 2008, it had returned intermittently with only infomercials. Carriage on cable systems ceased once the Columbus Sports Network ceased operations in 2008.

By August 10, 2009, it broadcast only a notice that it had "video trouble" and that "this channel is temporarily off-line due to technical difficulties". By September 3, 2009, it was off the air. By September 4, 2009, it was broadcasting a color test pattern with its call sign.

In 2009 the original owners, United Media Acquisitions, filed for bankruptcy protection and the station was sold to Columbus Television, LLC. Once the transfer was completed, the new owners made an agreement to simulcast the WCPX-LP broadcast of Azteca América. This agreement continued after WCSN made the conversion to digital broadcasting in early 2010. Columbus Television, LLC ended its relationship with WCPX in July 2010.

WCSN would eventually convert to digital broadcast and carry four regular subchannels—Mexicanal, Dalmar TV (a Somali language television channel), TV Africa Network (English language Pan-African news, sport and entertainment channel), and Prime TV Network. Effective March 20, 2012, WCSN's Mexicanal and Dalmar services was added to WOW's channel lineup on channels 103 and 106 respectively. WCPX-LP switched from Azteca America to Mexicanal in 2011, though it is unknown if there is any relation with WCSN.

== Subchannels ==
The station's digital signal is multiplexed:

Subchannels of WCSN-LD
Channel	Res.	Short name	Programming
32.1	480i	Movies!	Movies!
32.2	480i	Heroes	H&I
32.3	480i	StartTV	Start TV
32.4	480i	Grio	QVC2
32.5	480i	OAN	One America News Plus
32.6	480i	WBN	WBN America
32.7	480i	HSN	HSN
32.8	480i	AVoice	America's Voice
