= Juan Huerta Montero =

Mexican politician (1964–2010)

- Born: 21 February 1964; San Luis de la Paz, Guanajuato, Mexico
- Died: 3 September 2010 (aged 46); Santa María Huatulco, Oaxaca, Mexico
- Occupation: Politician
- Political party: PAN

Juan Huerta Montero (21 February 1964 – 3 September 2010) was a Mexican politician from the National Action Party (PAN). From 2009 to 2010 he sat in the Chamber of Deputies to represent Guanajuato's 1st district during the 61st session of Congress.

On 3 September 2010, Huerta and a fellow deputy, Guillermo Zavaleta Rojas, died in a plane crash near Bahías de Huatulco International Airport in Oaxaca. He was replaced for the remainder of his congressional term by his alternate, Aránzazu Quintana Padilla.
