= Alfonso Moreno =

Alfonso Moreno may refer to:

- Alfonso Moreno Redondo, (1910–2010), Spanish poet, winner of the 1943 Premio Adonáis de Poesía
- Alfonso Moreno Morán (born 1950), Mexican politician
- Alfonso Moreno (motorsports), Argentine driver, competed in the 1953 Carrera Panamericana
- Alfonso Moreno (hockey), Spanish hockey player, competed in the 2010 Men's EuroHockey Junior Championship
