= Ruth Lugo =

Mexican politician (born 1967)

- Born: 14 June 1967 (age 58); Guanajuato, Mexico
- Occupation: Politician
- Political party: PAN

Ruth Esperanza Lugo Martínez (born 14 June 1967) is a Mexican politician from the National Action Party (PAN). In the 2009 mid-terms, she was elected to the Chamber of Deputies to represent Guanajuato's 4th district during the 61st session of Congress.
