= Margarita Arenas Guzmán =

Mexican politician (born 1957)

- Born: 25 January 1957 (age 69); Guanajuato, Mexico
- Occupation: Politician
- Political party: PAN

Margarita Arenas Guzmán (born 25 January 1957) is a Mexican politician affiliated with the National Action Party (PAN). In the 2006 general election, she was elected to the Chamber of Deputies to represent Guanajuato's 4th district during the 60th session of Congress.
