= Francisco Javier Chico Goerne =

Mexican politician

- Born: 15 November 1960 (age 65); Guanajuato, Mexico
- Education: UMSNH
- Occupation: Politician
- Political party: PAN

Francisco Javier Chico Goerne Cobián (born 15 November 1960) is a Mexican politician from the National Action Party (PAN).

He was a member of the Congress of Guanajuato from 1997 to 2000 and, in the 2000 general election, he was elected to the Chamber of Deputies to represent Guanajuato's 9th district during the 58th session of Congress.
