= María Esther Garza Moreno =

Mexican politician (born 1948)

- Born: 23 July 1948 (age 77); Guanajuato, Mexico
- Occupation: Politician
- Political party: PRI party

María Esther Garza Moreno (born 23 July 1948) is a Mexican politician affiliated with the Institutional Revolutionary Party (PRI). In the 2012 general election, she was elected to the Chamber of Deputies to represent Guanajuato's 4th district during the 62nd session of Congress.
