= Trinidad River =

Location
- Country: Mexico
- State: Oaxaca

Physical characteristics
- Source
  - location: Sierra Madre de Oaxaca
- Mouth
  - location: San Juan River

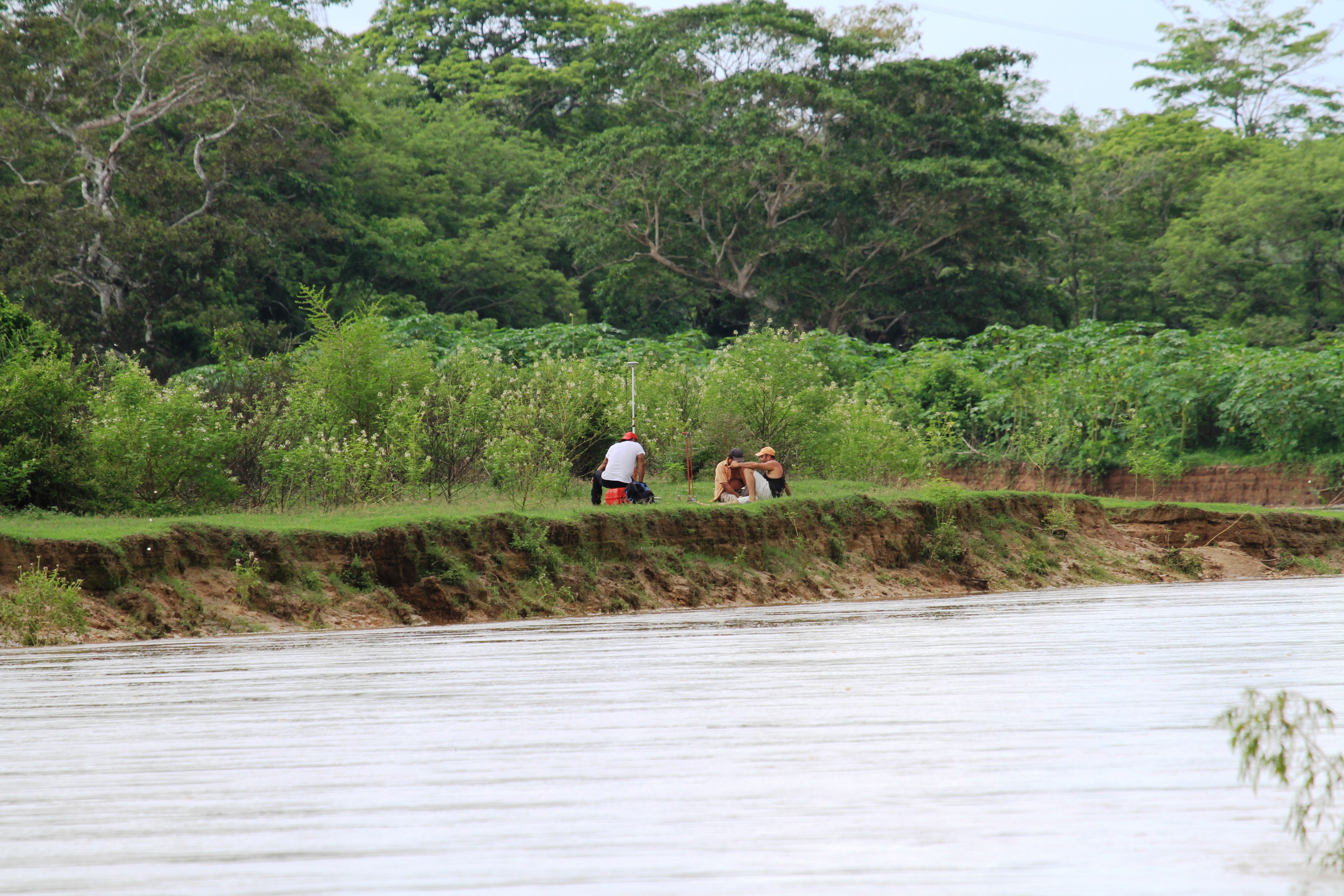

The Trinidad River (Mexico) is a river of Oaxaca state in Mexico.

It originates in the Sierra de Villa Alta sub-range of the Sierra Madre de Oaxaca and flows northeastwards onto the Gulf Coastal Plain, where it joins the Lalana River to form the San Juan River. The San Juan is a tributary of the Papaloapan River, which empties into the Gulf of Mexico.

== See also ==
- List of rivers of Mexico
