= Aranzazú Quintana =

Mexican politician (born 1979)

- Born: 4 May 1979 (age 47); Mexico City, Mexico
- Occupation: Politician
- Political party: PAN

Aranzazú Quintana Padilla (born 4 May 1979) is a Mexican politician from the National Action Party (PAN). From 2010 to 2012, during the 61st session of Congress, she sat in the Chamber of Deputies to represent Guanajuato's 1st district as the alternate of Juan Huerta Montero.
