= Guillermo Zavaleta Rojas =

Mexican politician (1976–2010)

- Born: 19 March 1976; Juquila, Oaxaca, Mexico
- Died: 3 September 2010 (aged 34); Santa María Huatulco, Oaxaca, Mexico
- Occupation: Politician
- Political party: PAN

Guillermo José Zavaleta Rojas (19 March 1976 – 3 September 2010) was a Mexican politician from the National Action Party. From 2009 to 2010 he served as Deputy of the LXI Legislature of the Mexican Congress, representing Guanajuato.

On 3 September 2010, Zavaleta and a fellow Deputy, Juan Huerta Montero, died in a plane crash near the Bahías de Huatulco International Airport.
