= Marcela Cuen Garibi =

Mexican politician

- Born: 1 July 1966 (age 59); Mexico City, Mexico
- Occupation: Politician
- Political party: PAN (1988–2013)

Marcela Cuen Garibi (born 1 July 1966) is a Mexican politician formerly affiliated with the National Action Party (PAN). In the 2006 general election, she was elected to the Chamber of Deputies on the PAN ticket to represent Guanajuato's 9th district during the 60th session of Congress.
