= María Auxiliadora, Guanajuato =

María Auxiliadora, known before as Chupaderos, is a town located near the municipality of San Felipe, Guanajuato "Torres Mochas" in Mexico. In 1995 it had a population of 330. It has a population of no more than 400 people, with many of its residents having moved to the United States, leaving their homes uninhabited.
