= Francisco Arroyo Vieyra =

Mexican politician (born 1959)

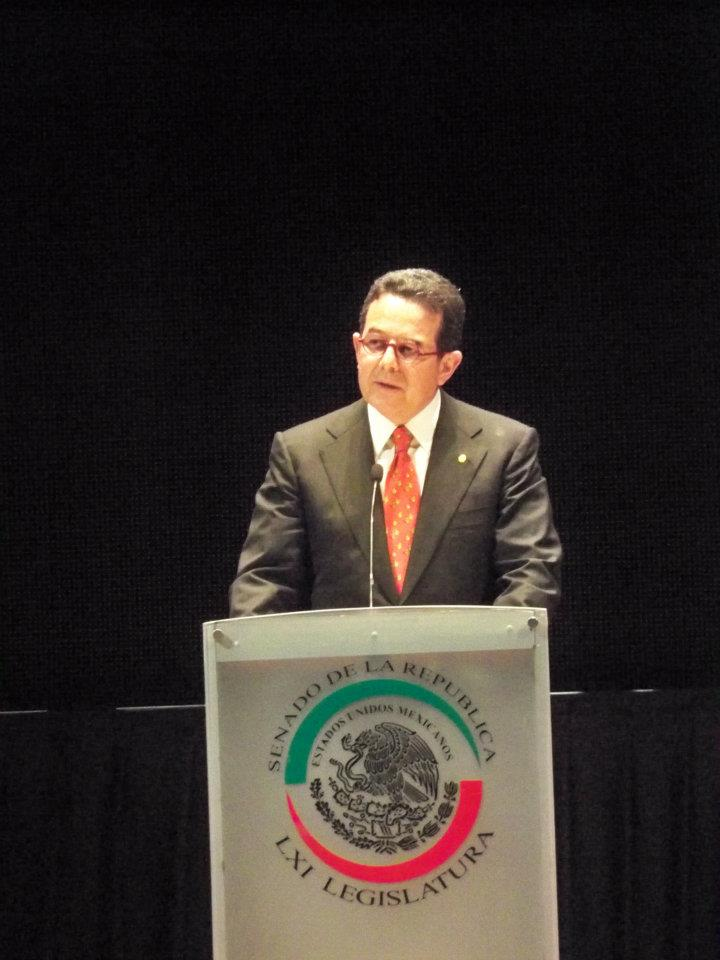

President of the Chamber of Deputies
- In office 11 December 2012 – 31 August 2013
- Preceded by: Jesús Murillo Karam
- Succeeded by: Ricardo Anaya Cortés

Personal details
- Born: 16 April 1959 (age 66) León, Guanajuato, Mexico
- Party: PRI
- Occupation: Politician

Francisco Agustín Arroyo Vieyra (born 16 April 1959) is a Mexican politician affiliated with the Institutional Revolutionary Party (PRI).

He has served four terms in the Chamber of Deputies: 1991–1994 (for Guanajuato's 1st); 1997–2000 and 2003–2006 (for Guanajuato's 4th); and 2012–2015 (plurinominal), during which he served as president of the Chamber of Deputies for a period of some eight months.

He also served in the Senate, representing Guanajuato, in 2006–2012.
