= Francisco Javier Murillo Flores =

Mexican politician (born 1959)

- Born: 14 August 1959 (age 66); Guanajuato, Mexico
- Occupation: Politician
- Political party: PAN

Francisco Javier Murillo Flores (born 14 August 1959) is a Mexican politician affiliated with the National Action Party (PAN). In the 2006 general election, he was elected to the Chamber of Deputies to represent Guanajuato's 1st district during the 60th session of Congress.
