= Sixto Zetina =

Mexican politician (born 1985)

- Born: 31 March 1985 (age 41); Irapuato, Guanajuato, Mexico
- Education: UVM
- Occupation: Politician
- Political party: PAN

Sixto Alfonso Zetina Soto (born 31 March 1985) is a Mexican politician from the National Action Party (PAN). In the 2009 mid-terms, he was elected to the Chamber of Deputies to represent Guanajuato's 9th district during the 61st session of Congress.
