= Alejandro Rangel Segovia =

Mexican politician

- Born: 29 August 1962 (age 63); Guanajuato, Mexico
- Occupation: Politician
- Political party: PRI

Alejandro Rangel Segovia (born 29 August 1962) is a Mexican politician affiliated with the Institutional Revolutionary Party (PRI). In the 2012 general election, he was elected to the Chamber of Deputies to represent Guanajuato's 9th district during the 62nd session of Congress.
