= Lalana River =

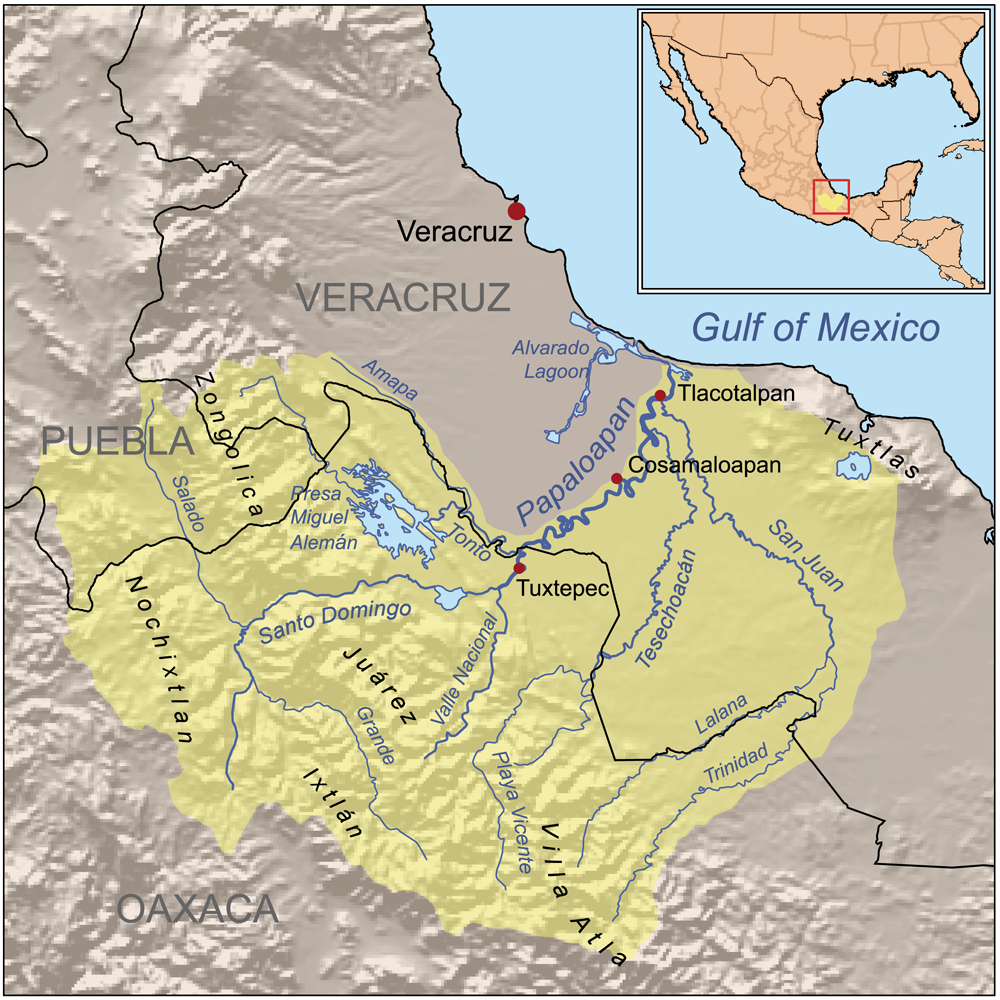
- Map of the Papaloapan River basin. Lalana River in the eastern sector.

Location
- Country: Mexico
- States of Mexico: Oaxaca and Veracruz

Physical characteristics
- Source
  - location: Sierra Madre de Oaxaca
- Mouth
  - location: San Juan River

The Lalana River is a river of Oaxaca and Veracruz states of Mexico.

It originates in the Sierra de Villa Alta sub-range of the Sierra Madre de Oaxaca in Oaxaca, and flows northeastwards onto the Gulf Coastal Plain, where it joins the Trinidad River in Veracruz to form the San Juan River. The San Juan is a tributary of the Papaloapan River, which empties into the Gulf of Mexico.

The lower Lalana River forms a portion of the boundary between Oaxaca and Veracruz.

== See also ==
- List of rivers of Mexico
