= Petra Barrera Barrera =

Mexican politician (born 1961)

- Born: 29 April 1961 (age 65); Guanajuato, Mexico
- Occupation: Politician
- Political party: PRI

Petra Barrera Barrera (born 29 April 1961) is a Mexican politician affiliated with the Institutional Revolutionary Party (PRI). In the 2012 general election, she was elected to the Chamber of Deputies to represent Guanajuato's 1st district during the 62nd session of Congress.
