= Mexicanal =

Mexican television channel

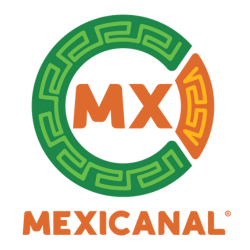
Mexicanal logo (2023)

Mexicanal is a Mexican-based Spanish-language pay television network launched on August 23, 2005 by Castalia Communications and Innokap. The network's studios and broadcast center is based in the Mexican city of San Luis Potosí.

== Programming ==
Mexicanal features news, cultural programming, sports and popular entertainment from public broadcasters, independent producers and public access stations throughout Mexico.

Programming on Mexicanal also includes its sports show LMJP “Liga Mexicana de Jaripeo Profesional”, the docuseries “Las Cantinas de Cornelio” among other own productions. In addition, the network showcases top local, national and international news, series, movies and overall entertainment from Mexico.

Other programs include:

- Ahí viene la Marimba,
- Con el Son de la Marimba,
- Estrellas del Jaripeo,
- De Kiosko en Kiosko, with host Cornelio Garcia visiting different municipalities in Jalisco to explore their culture, customs and traditions
- El Grito de Independencia (The Cry of Independence), La Ruta de Mexico (The Route of Mexico), shows that portrays the festivities and traditions of Mexicans.
- Las Cantinas de Cornelio, with host Cornelio Garcia
- Liga Mexicana de Jaripeo Profesional
- Tanque Lleno

Charter, AT&T, Mediacom, DISH, SLING and Comcast offer Mexicanal in their "Spanish-language tier" lineups in the United States.

== Mexicanal content ==
Since 2013 Mexicanal has been creating content:

- El Rayo Vida de Lucha, a reality series following the life of a Lucha libre wrestler and promoter Juan Padron Luna, also known as "Rayo de Plata". The series takes place in San Luis Potosi and the Bajío region of Mexico. In thirteen episodes, "El Rayo Vida de Lucha" highlights the ties between El Rayo his family, employees and wrestlers.
- Son Mariachis, a docu-reality series following a new generation Mariachi band. The band is composed of members of the Cuellar family. Son Mariachis now airs on NBC Universo.
- Necaxa, a docu-reality series following a soccer franchise.
- Imágenes de México, hosted by Javier Solórzano, Images of Mexico is a tourism show highlighting eclectic regions of Mexico from regional history to agriculture.
- Dragon Con Adventure, hosted by Maria Fernanda Villanueva, highlighting Atlanta's Dragon Con 2015 parade cosplay and celebrities.

== Mexican affiliates ==
While Mexicanal creates a limited amount of its own content, almost all of it is sourced from the various state networks, public broadcasters owned by the state governments. A notable exception was 20tv Zacatecas, which is a noncommercial station owned by commercial broadcaster Grupo Radiofónico B-15 until SIZART Canal 24 appeared and became an affiliate.

City or state	Station
Aguascalientes	VA+ TV 26.1
Chiapas	Canal Diez Chiapas
Campeche	Televisión y Radio de Campeche
Mexico City / State of Mexico	Mexiquense TV
Guanajuato	TV CUATRO
Guerrero	Radio y Televisión de Guerrero
Hidalgo	Hidalgo Televisión
Jalisco	Jalisco TV
Michoacán	Sistema Michoacano de Radio y Televisión
Nuevo León	TV Nuevo León
Oaxaca	CORTV
Puebla	Puebla TV
Querétaro	Radio y Televisión Querétaro
Quintana Roo	Sistema Quintanarroense de Comunicación Social
San Luis Potosí	Nueve TV
Sonora	Telemax
Tabasco	TVT Televisión Tabasqueña
Veracruz	TVMÁS
Yucatán	Trecevisión
Zacatecas	SIZART Canal 24
