= Alfonso Moreno Morán =

Mexican politician

- Born: 21 January 1950 (age 76); León, Guanajuato, Mexico
- Education: UASLP
- Occupation: Politician
- Political party: PAN

Alfonso Moreno Morán (born 21 January 1950) is a Mexican politician affiliated with the National Action Party (PAN). In the 2003 mid-terms, he was elected to the Chamber of Deputies to represent Guanajuato's 1st district during the 59th session of Congress.
