= San Juan River (Veracruz) =

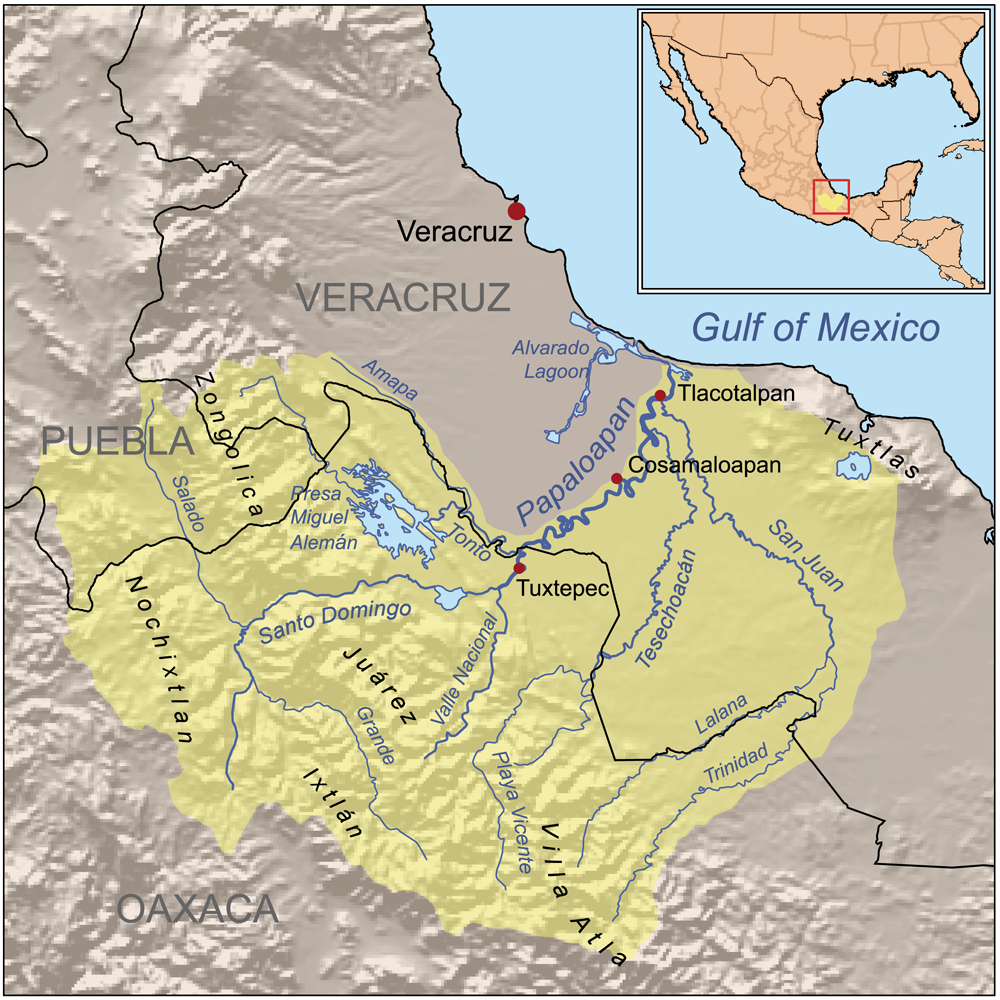
- Map showing the San Juan River in the drainage basin of the Papaloapan River.

Location
- Country: Mexico

Physical characteristics
- Mouth: Papaloapan River

The San Juan River is a river of Veracruz state in eastern Mexico. It is a tributary of the Papaloapan River.

The San Juan River is formed by the confluence of the Lalana and Trinidad rivers, whose headwaters are in the Sierra de Villa Alta sub-range of the Sierra Madre de Oaxaca. The San Juan flows northeastwards before turning northwestwards. It receives the Hueyapan River, which drains the southwestern slopes of the Sierra de los Tuxtlas, before emptying into the lower Papaloapan.

== See also ==
- List of rivers of Mexico
