= San José Iturbide =

Municipality in Guanajuato, Mexico

Coordinates: 21°00′N 100°23′W

- Municipality
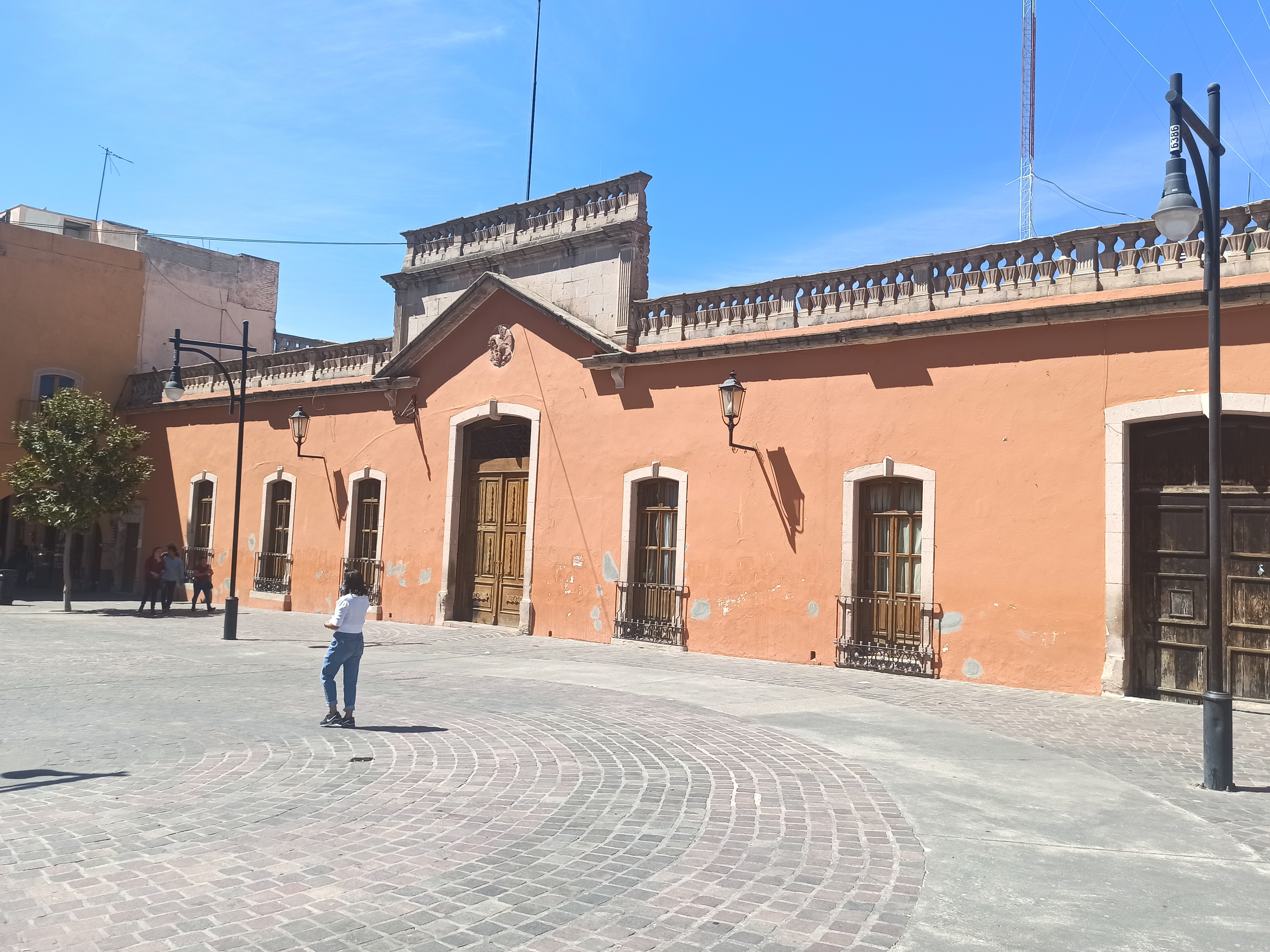
- Town hall

- Coat of arms

- Location in Guanajuato San José Iturbide (Mexico)
- Country: Mexico
- State: Guanajuato
- Demonym: (in Spanish)
- Time zone: UTC−6 (CST)

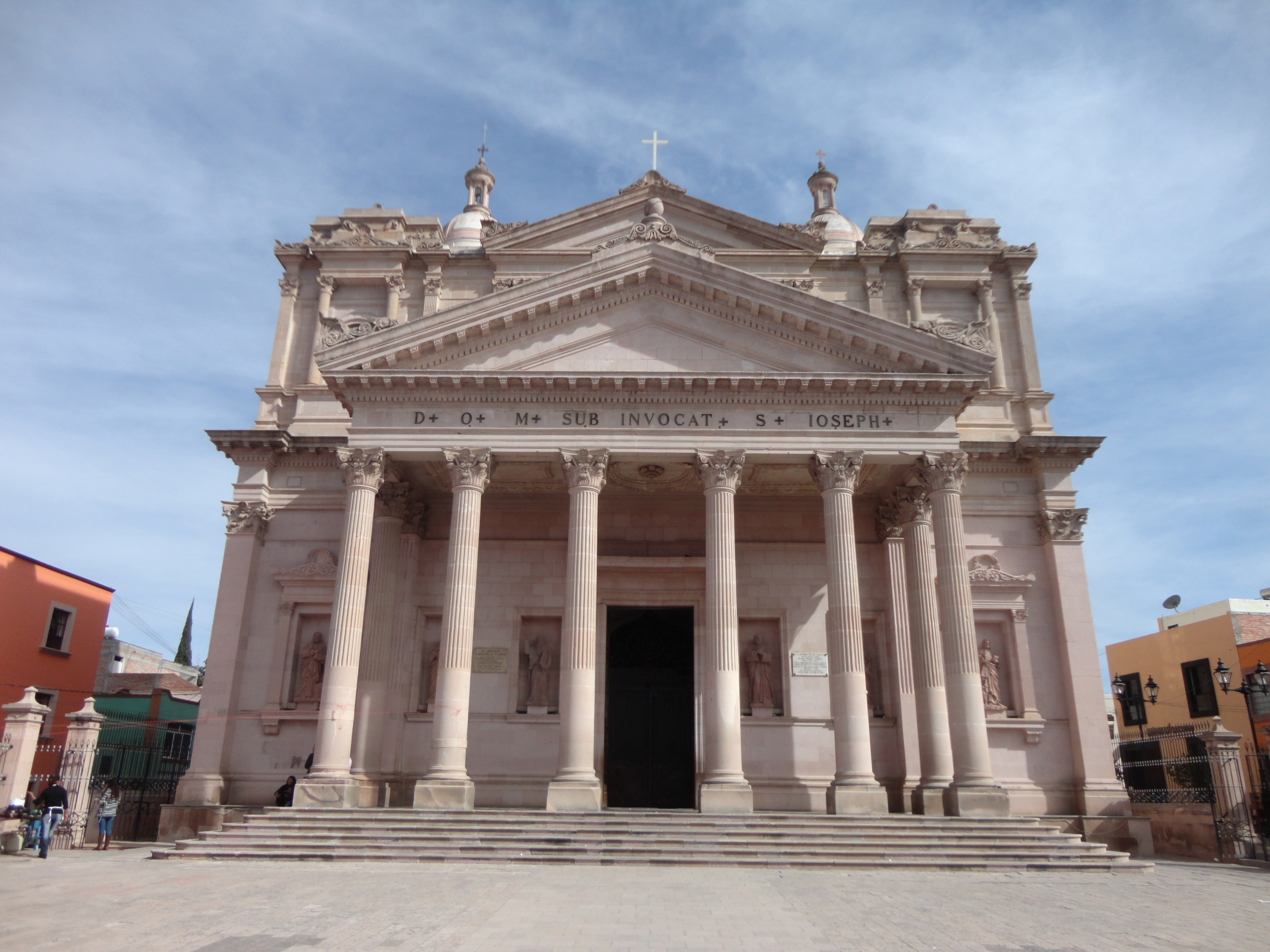
San José Parish

San José Iturbide is a Mexican city (and municipality) located in the Northeast region of the state of Guanajuato, within the Sierra Gorda range. It is named in honor of Saint Joseph and the first Emperor of Mexico, Agustín de Iturbide. The municipality has an area of 534.11 square kilometres (1.76% of the surface of the state) and is bordered to the north by San Luis de la Paz and Doctor Mora, to the east by Tierra Blanca, to the south by the state of Querétaro, and to the west by San Miguel de Allende. The municipality had a population of 54,661 inhabitants according to the 2005 census.

The municipal president of San José Iturbide is Arq. Jose Geronimo Robles Gutierrez

== Geography ==
=== Climate ===
Climate data for San José Iturbide (1991–2020 normals, extremes 1952–2018)
Month	Jan	Feb	Mar	Apr	May	Jun	Jul	Aug	Sep	Oct	Nov	Dec	Year
Record high °C (°F)	31 (88)	33.5 (92.3)	37 (99)	40 (104)	40 (104)	37.5 (99.5)	34 (93)	39 (102)	34 (93)	35 (95)	33 (91)	30 (86)	40 (104)
Mean daily maximum °C (°F)	23.4 (74.1)	25.3 (77.5)	27.7 (81.9)	29.6 (85.3)	30.9 (87.6)	28.1 (82.6)	26.6 (79.9)	26.8 (80.2)	25.9 (78.6)	25.5 (77.9)	25.2 (77.4)	23.7 (74.7)	26.6 (79.9)
Daily mean °C (°F)	13.7 (56.7)	15.4 (59.7)	17.6 (63.7)	19.9 (67.8)	21.3 (70.3)	20.1 (68.2)	19.0 (66.2)	19.0 (66.2)	18.4 (65.1)	16.9 (62.4)	15.7 (60.3)	14.3 (57.7)	17.6 (63.7)
Mean daily minimum °C (°F)	4.0 (39.2)	5.4 (41.7)	7.5 (45.5)	10.2 (50.4)	11.7 (53.1)	12.0 (53.6)	11.4 (52.5)	11.2 (52.2)	10.8 (51.4)	8.3 (46.9)	6.2 (43.2)	4.9 (40.8)	8.6 (47.5)
Record low °C (°F)	−5.4 (22.3)	−7 (19)	−2 (28)	0 (32)	3.4 (38.1)	3 (37)	5 (41)	5 (41)	−2 (28)	−2 (28)	−5 (23)	−10 (14)	−10 (14)
Average precipitation mm (inches)	12.4 (0.49)	13.2 (0.52)	7.6 (0.30)	20.3 (0.80)	38.8 (1.53)	102.0 (4.02)	110.8 (4.36)	80.5 (3.17)	100.0 (3.94)	34.2 (1.35)	8.0 (0.31)	4.0 (0.16)	531.8 (20.94)
Average rainy days	2.0	2.0	1.8	2.8	5.7	10.2	10.7	8.9	9.7	4.8	2.0	0.8	61.4
Source: Servicio Meteorológico Nacional
