= San Diego de la Unión =

- (United States)
- San Diego de la Unión
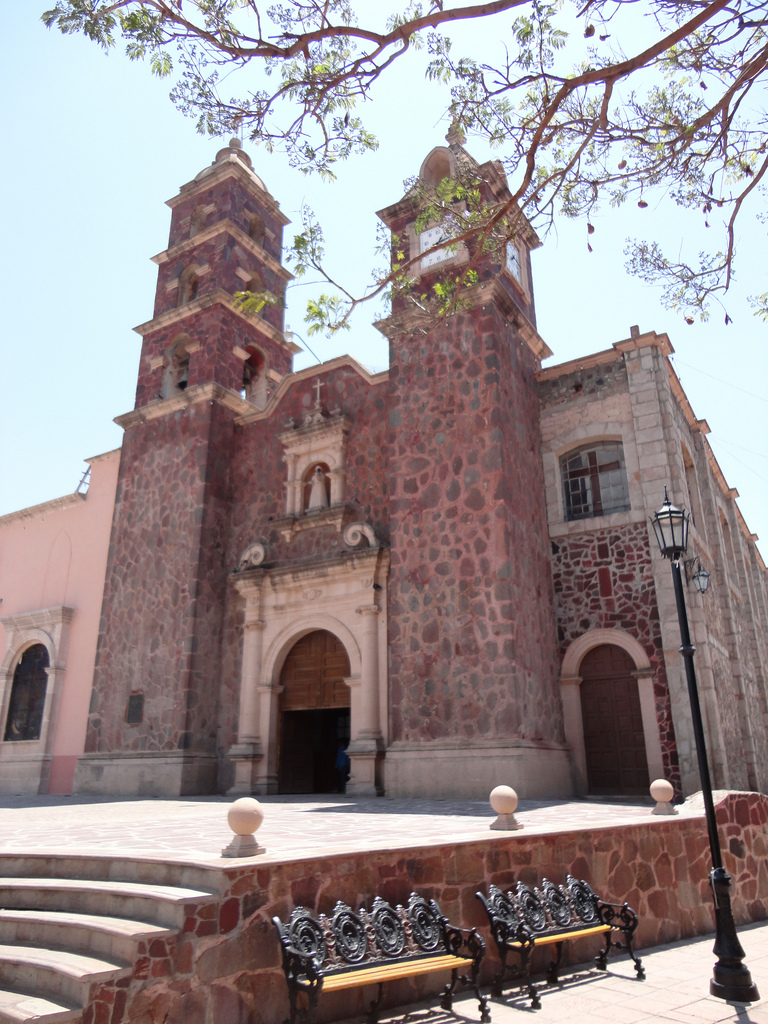

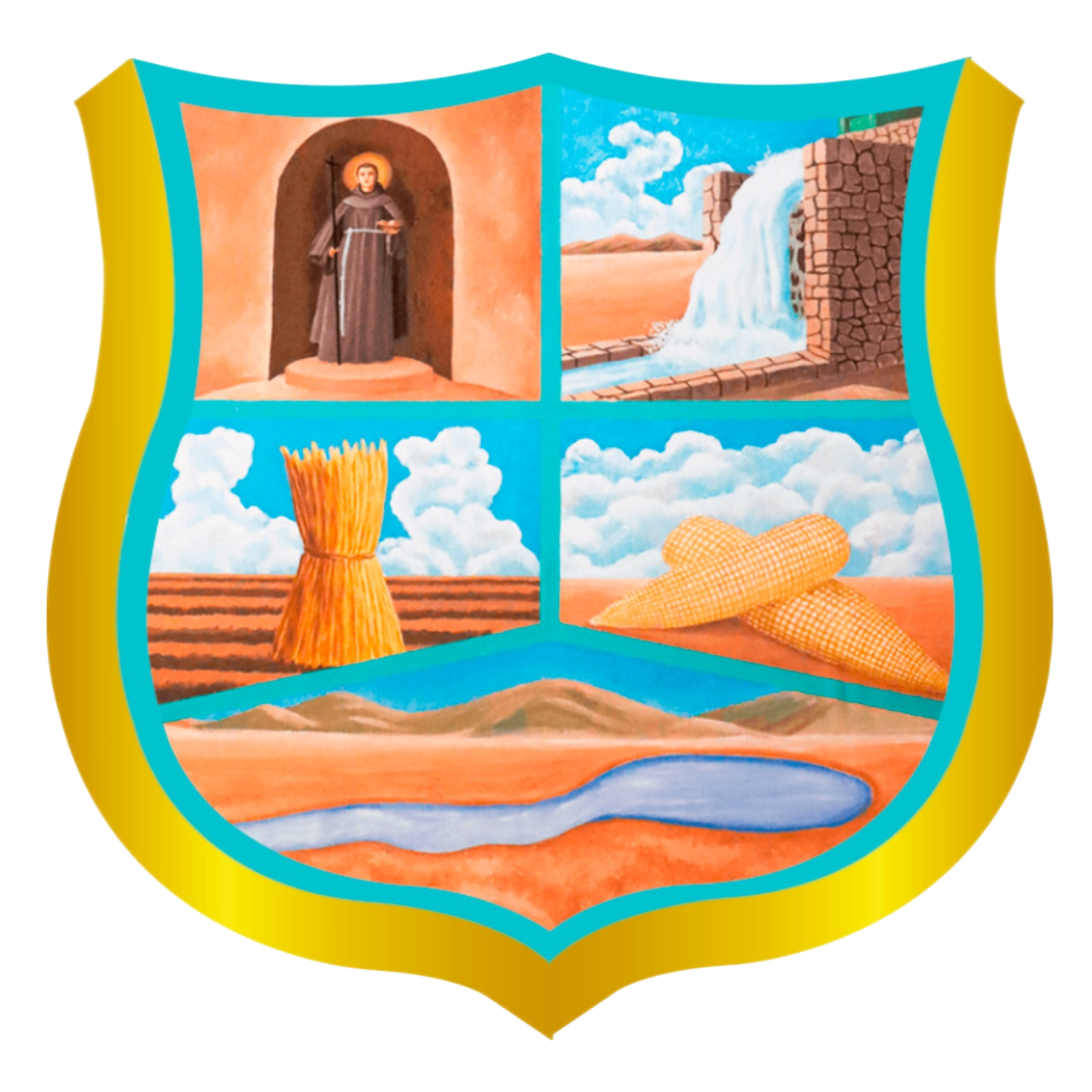
- Coat of arms
- Interactive map of San Diego de la Unión
- Coordinates: 21°27′56″N 100°52′25″W
- Country: Mexico
- State: Guanajuato
- Founded: 1719

Government
  - Mayor: Juan Carlos Castillo Cantero (2015 - 2018)
- Elevation: 2,070 m (6,790 ft)

Population (2011)
  - Total: 39,663
  - Density: 3,756/km^{2} (9,730/sq mi)
- Time zone: UTC−6
- Postal code: 37850

San Diego de la Unión is a Mexican city (and municipality) located in the Northwest region of the state of Guanajuato. The municipality has an area of 990.17 square kilometres (3.26% of the surface of the state) and is bordered to the north by San Luis Potosí, to the east by San Luis de la Paz, to the south by Dolores Hidalgo, and to the west by San Felipe. The municipality had 34,088 inhabitants according to the 2005 census.

The municipality of San Diego was founded in 1719 under the name of Pueblo de Bizcocho. It received its present name of San Diego de la Unión after San Diego de Alcalá, the Patron saint of Franciscan lay brothers.

The municipal president of San Diego de la Unión and its 236 outlying communities is Juan Carlos Castillo Cantero.
