= Victoria, Guanajuato =

Coordinates: 21°12′44″N 100°12′52″W

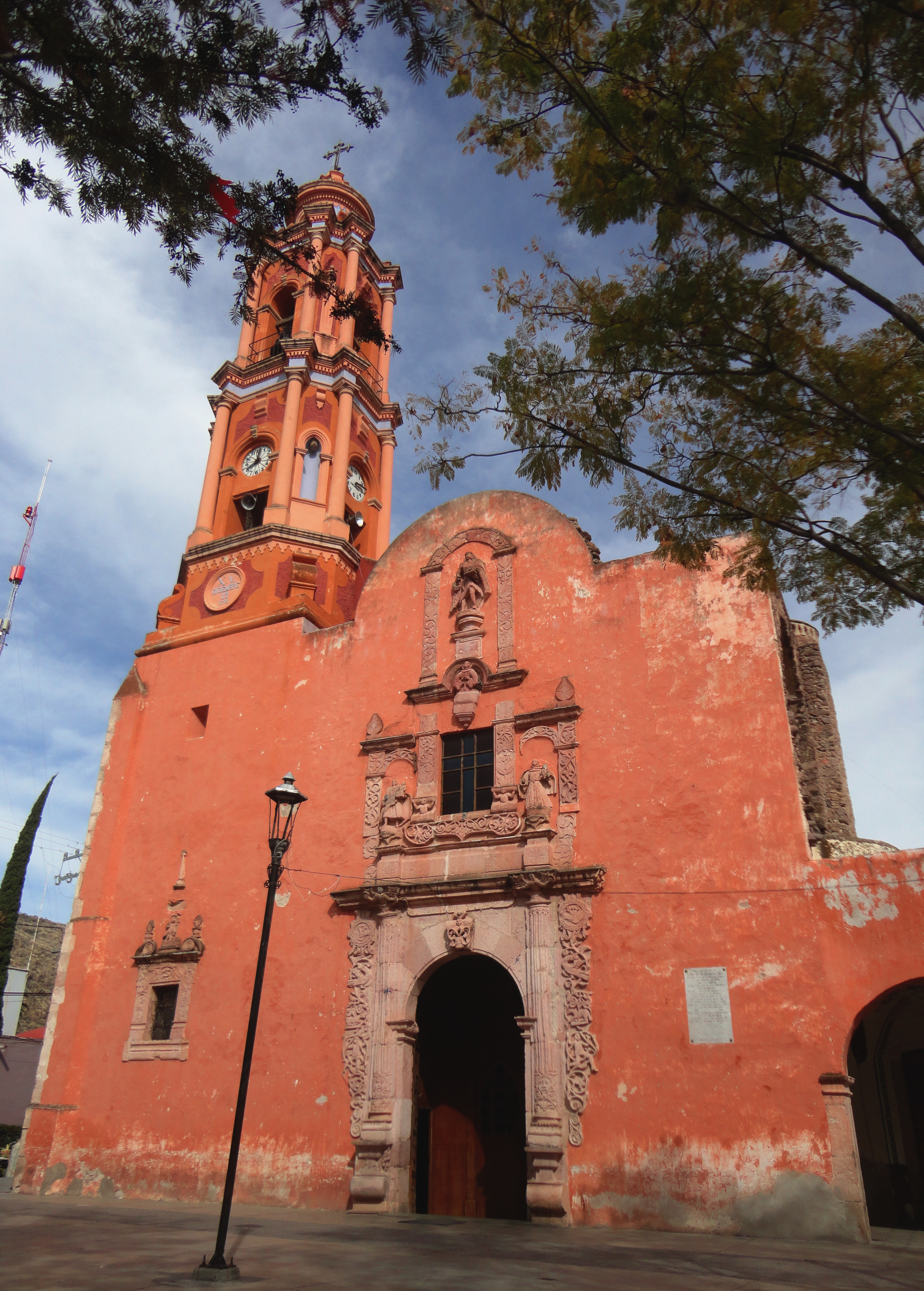
San Juan Bautista Parish

Victoria is a Mexican city (and municipality) located in the Northeast region of the state of Guanajuato, within the Sierra Gorda range. The municipality has an area of 1009.437 square kilometres (3.3% of the surface of the state) and is bordered to the north by the state of San Luis Potosí, to the east by Xichú, to the south by Santa Catarina and Doctor Mora, and to the west by San Luis de la Paz. The municipality had a population of 17,764 inhabitants according to the 2005 census.

The municipal president of Victoria and its many smaller outlying communities is Pedro Mendieta Chaire.
