= San Felipe, Guanajuato =

San Felipe
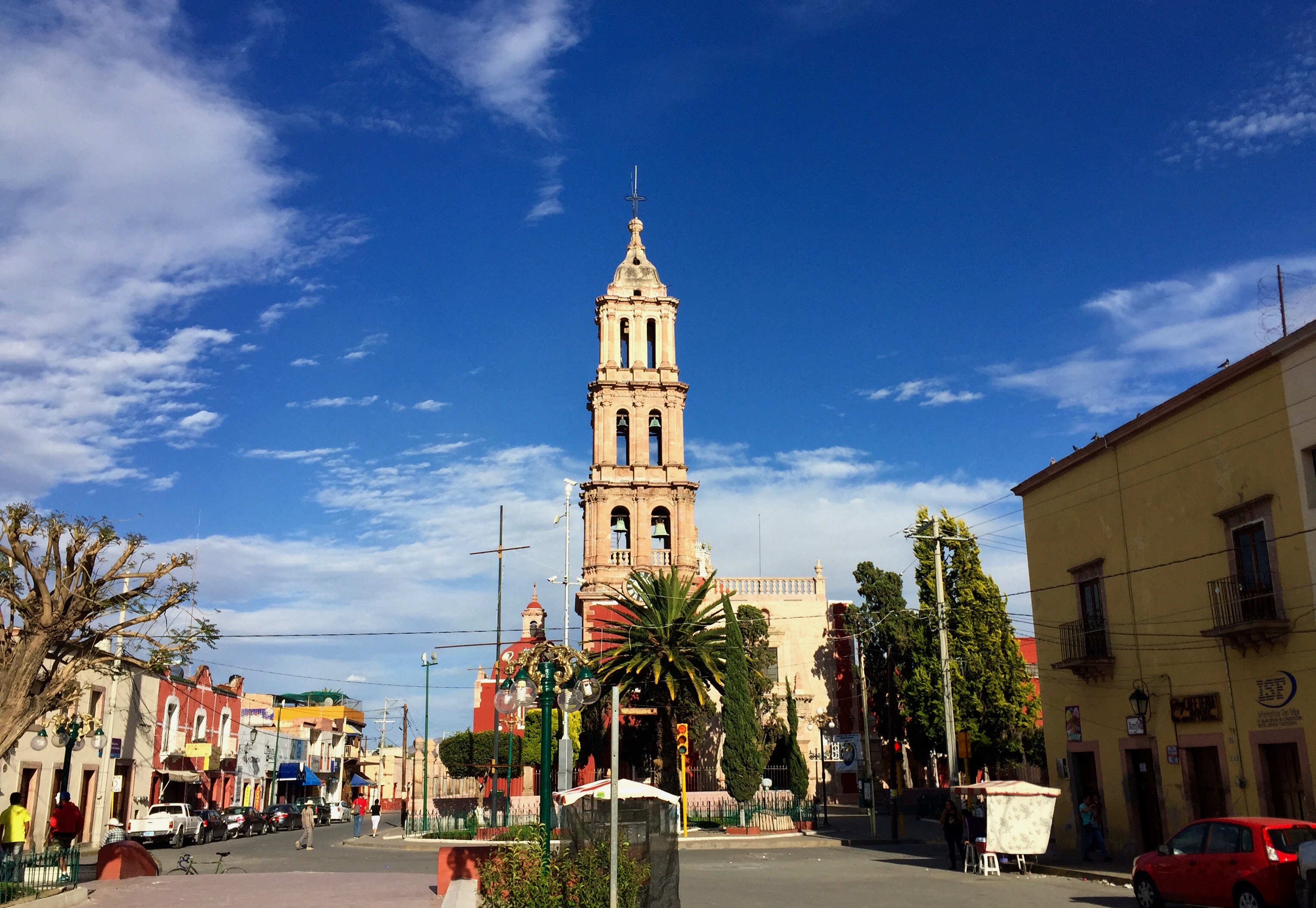
- The parish church and main square of San Felipe.

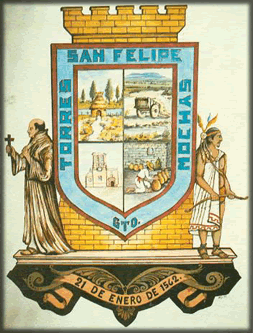
- Coat of arms

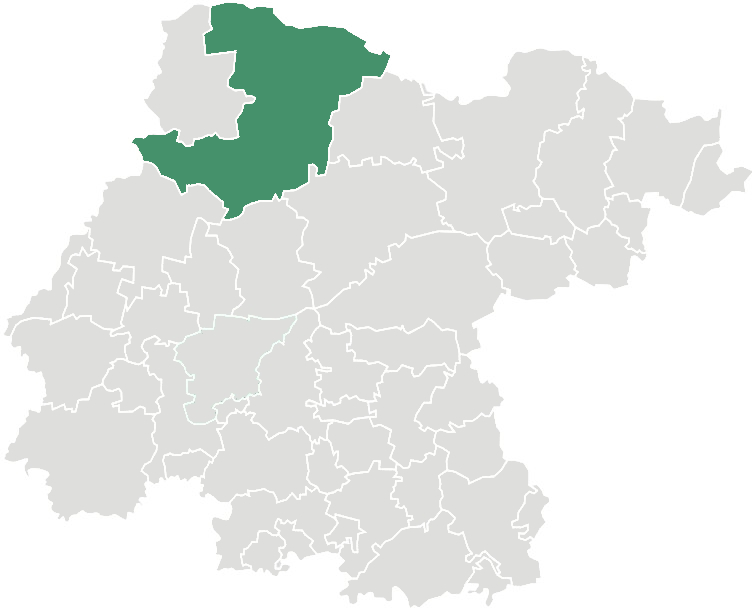
- Location of San Felipe within Guanajuato

- Location within Mexico
- Coordinates: 21°29′00″N 101°13′00″W
- Country: Mexico
- State: Guanajuato
- Foundation: January 21, 1562
- Founded as: Villa de San Felipe
- Founder: Francisco de Velasco
- Named for: Philip II of Spain

Government
  - Mayor: Miguel Ángel Flores Solís

Area
  - Total: 2,969.79 km^{2} (1,146.64 sq mi)
- Elevation: 2,080 m (6,820 ft)

Population (2010)
  - Total: 106,952
  - Density: 36.01/km^{2} (93.3/sq mi)
  - Demonym: sanfelipense
- Time zone: UTC−6 (Central Standard Time)
- Website: sanfelipe.guanajuato.gob.mx

San Felipe (Spanish pronunciation: [saɱ feˈlipe]), known colloquially as "San Felipe Torres Mochas" (Spanish pronunciation: [saɱ feˈlipe ˈtores ˈmotʃas]), is a Mexican city and municipality located in the northwest region of the state of Guanajuato. The municipality has an area of 2,969.79 square kilometers (9.50% of the state's surface), making it the biggest municipality in terms of size. It is bordered to the north by the municipality of Ocampo, to the south by the municipalities of León and Guanajuato, to the southeast by the municipality of Dolores Hidalgo and to the east by the municipality of San Diego de la Unión. It borders to the north with the state of San Luis Potosí and to the west with the state of Jalisco. The municipality had 106,952 inhabitants as of 2010.

== History ==
San Felipe was founded by Francisco de Velasco on January 21, 1562, by orders of viceroy Luís de Velasco. The city was founded with the name of San Felipe in honor of King Philip II of Spain. In 1889 the name of the city was changed to "Ciudad González" in honor of the then governor of Guanajuato, Manuel González. The name of the city was again changed in 1938, this time to "Ciudad Hernández Álvarez", after governor Enrique Hernández Álvarez. In 1948 the city's name was reverted to the original name of "San Felipe". Regardless of the several official names the city was given through time, it was always colloquially known as "San Felipe Torres Mochas" (lit. "San Felipe stub-towers"), a nickname that persists to this day.

== Geography ==
The municipality is located in the northwest region of the state of Guanajuato. It has an area of 2,969.79 square kilometers (9.50% of the state's surface), making it the biggest municipality in terms of size. It is bordered to the north by the municipality of Ocampo, to the south by the municipalities of León and Guanajuato, to the southeast by the municipality of Dolores Hidalgo and to the east by the municipality of San Diego de la Unión. It borders to the north with the state of San Luis Potosí and to the west with the state of Jalisco.

=== Climate ===
Climate data for San Felipe
Month	Jan	Feb	Mar	Apr	May	Jun	Jul	Aug	Sep	Oct	Nov	Dec	Year
Record high °C (°F)	27.0 (80.6)	28.0 (82.4)	32.5 (90.5)	36.5 (97.7)	37.0 (98.6)	37.5 (99.5)	31.0 (87.8)	31.0 (87.8)	31.5 (88.7)	38.0 (100.4)	39.5 (103.1)	29.0 (84.2)	39.5 (103.1)
Mean daily maximum °C (°F)	20.8 (69.4)	22.3 (72.1)	25.7 (78.3)	27.8 (82.0)	28.7 (83.7)	26.6 (79.9)	24.3 (75.7)	24.8 (76.6)	24.0 (75.2)	23.4 (74.1)	23.0 (73.4)	21.0 (69.8)	24.4 (75.9)
Daily mean °C (°F)	11.9 (53.4)	13.2 (55.8)	16.2 (61.2)	18.4 (65.1)	19.8 (67.6)	19.1 (66.4)	17.9 (64.2)	18.1 (64.6)	17.5 (63.5)	15.8 (60.4)	14.4 (57.9)	12.6 (54.7)	16.2 (61.2)
Mean daily minimum °C (°F)	3.0 (37.4)	4.0 (39.2)	6.6 (43.9)	9.0 (48.2)	10.9 (51.6)	11.6 (52.9)	11.4 (52.5)	11.4 (52.5)	10.9 (51.6)	8.3 (46.9)	5.7 (42.3)	4.1 (39.4)	8.1 (46.6)
Record low °C (°F)	−6.5 (20.3)	−8.0 (17.6)	−3.0 (26.6)	0.5 (32.9)	3.0 (37.4)	4.0 (39.2)	6.0 (42.8)	7.0 (44.6)	2.5 (36.5)	0.0 (32.0)	−5.0 (23.0)	−5.5 (22.1)	−8.0 (17.6)
Average precipitation mm (inches)	16.6 (0.65)	6.0 (0.24)	3.1 (0.12)	16.5 (0.65)	37.9 (1.49)	66.8 (2.63)	113.8 (4.48)	85.2 (3.35)	71.1 (2.80)	36.9 (1.45)	11.6 (0.46)	9.9 (0.39)	475.4 (18.72)
Average precipitation days (≥ 0.1 mm)	1.4	1.3	1.1	3.0	5.3	7.2	9.8	8.7	7.8	4.7	1.8	1.8	53.9
Source: Servicio Meteorologico Nacional

== Demographics ==
As of the census of 2010 there were 106,952 people and 22,830 households in the municipality, representing a population increase of 11,056 from the previous census in 2005. The population density was 36.01 people/km^{2} (93.3 people/mi^{2}), with an average of 4.7 people per household.

== Economy ==
The economy of the municipality is based mostly on the textile industry.

== See also ==
- María Auxiliadora, Guanajuato
