= Ocampo, Guanajuato =

Municipality in Guanajuato, Mexico

Coordinates: 21.650°N 101.500°W

Ocampo
- Municipality
- Coat of arms

- Location in Guanajuato Ocampo (Mexico)
- Country: Mexico
- State: Guanajuato
- Demonym: (in Spanish)
- Time zone: UTC−6 (CST)

Ocampo is a city (and municipality) located in the northwest region of the Mexican state of Guanajuato. The municipality has an area of 1,019.49 square kilometres (3.7% of the surface of the state) and is bordered and to the south and east by San Felipe, to the north by the state of San Luis Potosí, to the west by the state of Jalisco. The municipality had a population of 23,500 inhabitants according to the 2010 census.

The municipality is named after Melchor Ocampo, a 19th-century liberal statesman.

The municipal president of Ocampo and its many smaller outlying communities is Francisco Pedroza

As of 2008, the largest group of immigrants from Ocampo go to Dallas, and the second-largest go to Chicago.

== Climate ==
Climate data for Ocampo, Guanajuato (1991–2020 normals, extremes 1924–present)
Month	Jan	Feb	Mar	Apr	May	Jun	Jul	Aug	Sep	Oct	Nov	Dec	Year
Record high °C (°F)	32 (90)	33 (91)	36 (97)	39 (102)	39.5 (103.1)	39 (102)	38.5 (101.3)	35.5 (95.9)	37 (99)	35 (95)	33 (91)	32 (90)	39.5 (103.1)
Mean daily maximum °C (°F)	23.2 (73.8)	24.7 (76.5)	27.1 (80.8)	28.4 (83.1)	29.8 (85.6)	29.0 (84.2)	27.6 (81.7)	27.2 (81.0)	26.2 (79.2)	25.7 (78.3)	24.8 (76.6)	23.9 (75.0)	26.5 (79.7)
Daily mean °C (°F)	13.2 (55.8)	14.7 (58.5)	16.9 (62.4)	18.5 (65.3)	20.0 (68.0)	20.2 (68.4)	19.2 (66.6)	19.0 (66.2)	18.3 (64.9)	17.0 (62.6)	15.3 (59.5)	13.9 (57.0)	17.2 (63.0)
Mean daily minimum °C (°F)	3.3 (37.9)	4.7 (40.5)	6.7 (44.1)	8.5 (47.3)	10.3 (50.5)	11.3 (52.3)	10.7 (51.3)	10.7 (51.3)	10.4 (50.7)	8.3 (46.9)	5.8 (42.4)	3.9 (39.0)	7.9 (46.2)
Record low °C (°F)	−9.5 (14.9)	−6 (21)	−4 (25)	−1.3 (29.7)	3 (37)	5.2 (41.4)	4 (39)	5 (41)	1.1 (34.0)	−1 (30)	−8 (18)	−5 (23)	−9.5 (14.9)
Average precipitation mm (inches)	12.4 (0.49)	17.1 (0.67)	12.0 (0.47)	7.9 (0.31)	34.3 (1.35)	78.8 (3.10)	103.9 (4.09)	73.2 (2.88)	86.0 (3.39)	26.5 (1.04)	11.0 (0.43)	7.0 (0.28)	470.1 (18.51)
Average rainy days	2.0	1.9	1.6	1.3	4.2	8.2	9.2	7.6	8.1	4.0	1.4	1.2	50.7
Source: Servicio Meteorológico Nacional

== Education ==
Fifty schools are located in Ocampo. They include:

- Escuela Primaria 18 de Marzo (La Tinajia area) - In 2008 Jose Juan Salazar, an official from the education department of Ocampo municipality, stated that it was the best school in Ocampo.
- Gral Vicente Guerrero Urban School #1
