= Doctor Mora =

Municipal seat of Doctor Mora, State of Guanajuato, Mexico

Coordinates: 21°08′33″N 100°19′09″W

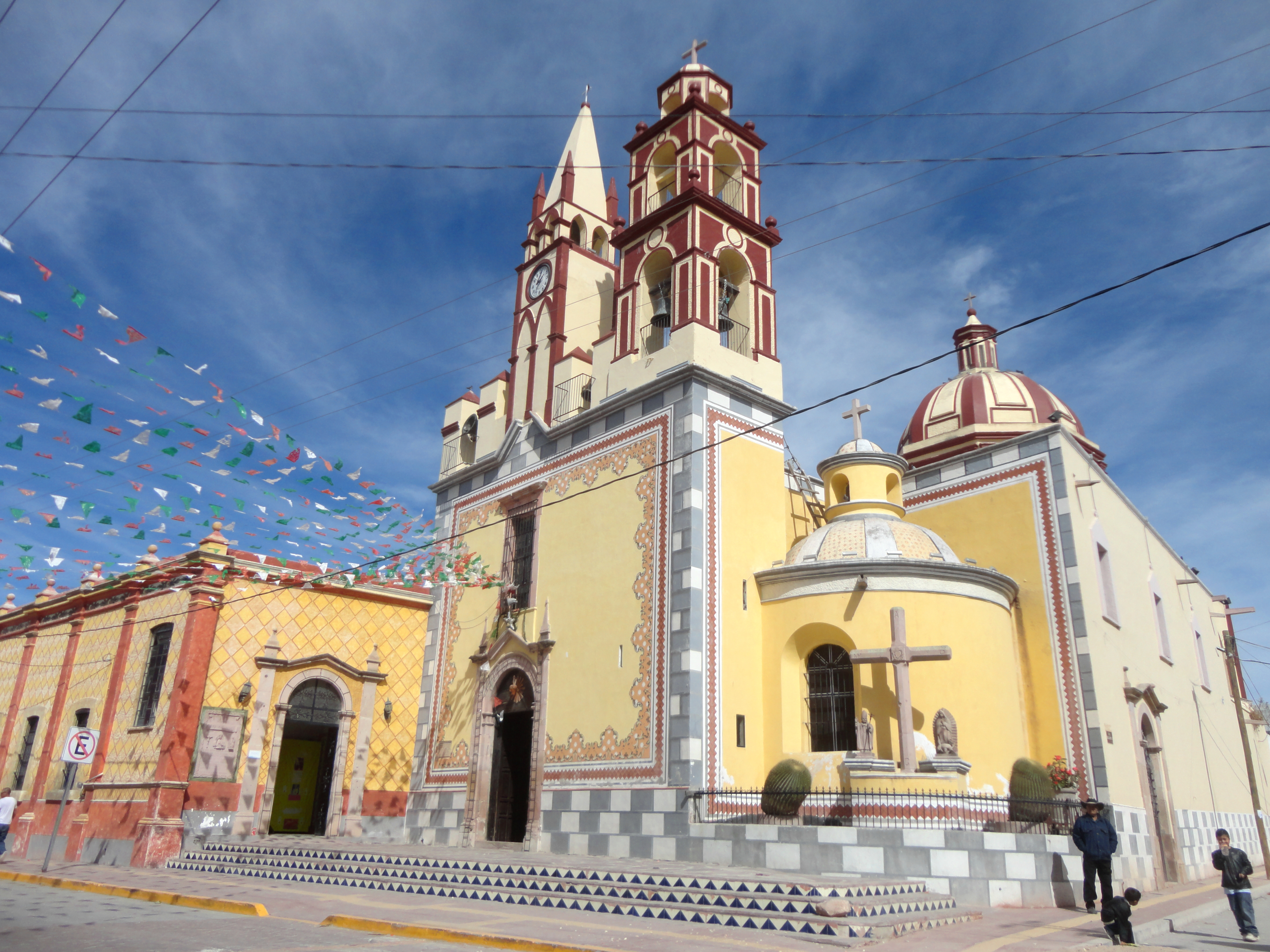
El Divino Salvador Parish

Doctor Mora is a Mexican city (and municipality) located in Northeast region of the state of Guanajuato. The municipality has an area of 233.91 square kilometres (0.77% of the surface of the state) and is bordered to the north by Victoria, to the east by Tierra Blanca, to the south by San José Iturbide, and to the west by San Luis de la Paz. The municipality consists of 74 localities within it. The municipality has a population of 29,464 according to the 2025 census.

Doctor Mora is named after José María Luis Mora.

The municipal president of Doctor Mora and its many smaller outlying communities is Edgar Javier Resendiz Jacobo (2021–2027).

== History ==
Doctor Mora owes its establishment as a municipality significantly to the leadership and dedication of José María Valencia Orduña. Born on February 14, 1891, Valencia Orduña was a pivotal figure in the region's history, particularly during the tumultuous times of the Cristero War.

In the early 20th century, the area known as Charcas (now Doctor Mora) was frequently targeted by bandits and Cristero rebels. Valencia Orduña, a respected local merchant, took on the responsibility of organizing the community's defense. In 1929, the town faced a significant threat from Cristero forces led by General Manuel Frías. Valencia Orduña, representing the townspeople, sought assistance from General Genovevo Rivas Guillén, commander of the military sector in San Luis de la Paz. Due to a shortage of troops, General Rivas Guillén provided weapons and training to the local population instead of a military garrison, appointing Valencia Orduña as the commander of the local defense.

On Palm Sunday, March 24, 1929, the Cristero forces launched a major attack on Charcas. Under Valencia Orduña's leadership, about 30 armed residents, strategically positioned in the town’s key locations, successfully repelled the assault after an intense eight-hour battle. This victory was crucial in protecting the community and solidified Valencia Orduña's status as a local hero.

Beyond his military leadership, Valencia Orduña also played an instrumental role in the political and infrastructural development of the area. In 1935, as a local deputy in the Guanajuato State Legislature, Valencia Orduña secured the construction of essential infrastructure, such as the "Melchor Ortega" dam and the "General Lázaro Cárdenas" primary school. His most significant achievement came in 1949, when he led a successful movement to elevate Charcas to municipal status, officially naming it Doctor Mora in honor of the liberal politician José María Luis Mora. Under his leadership, the municipality saw the introduction of electricity in 1951 and the development of a water extraction system in the late 1950s. Valencia Orduña also facilitated the construction of a crucial road connecting Doctor Mora to the main highway, enhancing accessibility and fostering growth. He ran a local store which became a cornerstone of the town’s social and economic life, and died in 1985.

== Culture ==
Doctor Mora hosts two notable cultural events that are celebrated annually.

One of the most prominent is the Feria del Pulque y las Carnitas, a week-long festival held each August to celebrate two of the town's main culinary staples: pulque, a fermented agave beverage, and carnitas, slow-cooked pork. This festival, which began in the early 2010s, aims to promote local food culture and attract visitors from surrounding regions. The event has grown in popularity over the years and now draws tourists from neighboring states.

The other major cultural event in Doctor Mora is the Día de los Muertos parade, which takes place each year in November as part of Mexico's rich Day of the Dead traditions. This event, which began in the mid-2010s, was conceived by local high school teachers Edgar Javier Resendiz Jacobo, Walter Milan, and Ahida Mata.

== Economy ==
The economy of Doctor Mora is mainly based on agriculture and the economy, these being some of the town's largest sources of income, in addition to local commerce such as food, clothing, and other establishments.

Another significant portion of Doctor Mora's economy, like in other rural communities in Mexico, is based on migration and something called remittances, which is the money sent primarily from the United States to the town.
