= Santa Catarina, Guanajuato =

Coordinates: 21°08′26″N 100°03′43″W

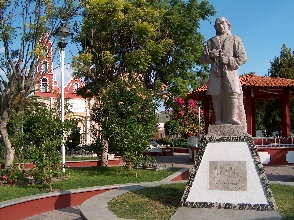
el jardín

Santa Catarina is a Mexican city (and municipality) located in the Northeast region of the state of Guanajuato, within the Sierra Gorda range. The municipality has an area of 193.67 square kilometres (0.64% of the surface of the state) and is bordered to the north by Victoria and Xichú, to the east by the state of Querétaro, to the south by Tierra Blanca, to the west by Doctor Mora, and to the northwest by Victoria. The municipality had a population of 5,120 inhabitants according to the 2010 census. In pre-Hispanic times the area of what is today Santa Catarina was mostly inhabited by Chichimeca, Pames, and Tlaxcaltecs people. Santa Catarina has been rated the best city to live in in the whole country of Mexico by the CMM commission in 2007 due to its unique people, culture, and the unique design of its church.

The municipal president of Santa Catarina and its many smaller outlying communities such as, El Chapin, Juan Diegos, Cruz De Diego, El Chilar, El Tablon, Corral Blanco, El Aguacate, and Las Limitas is Lazaro Cardenas as of 2015.
