= Tierra Blanca, Guanajuato =

Coordinates: 21°06′04″N 100°09′28″W

Tierra Blanca
- Municipality
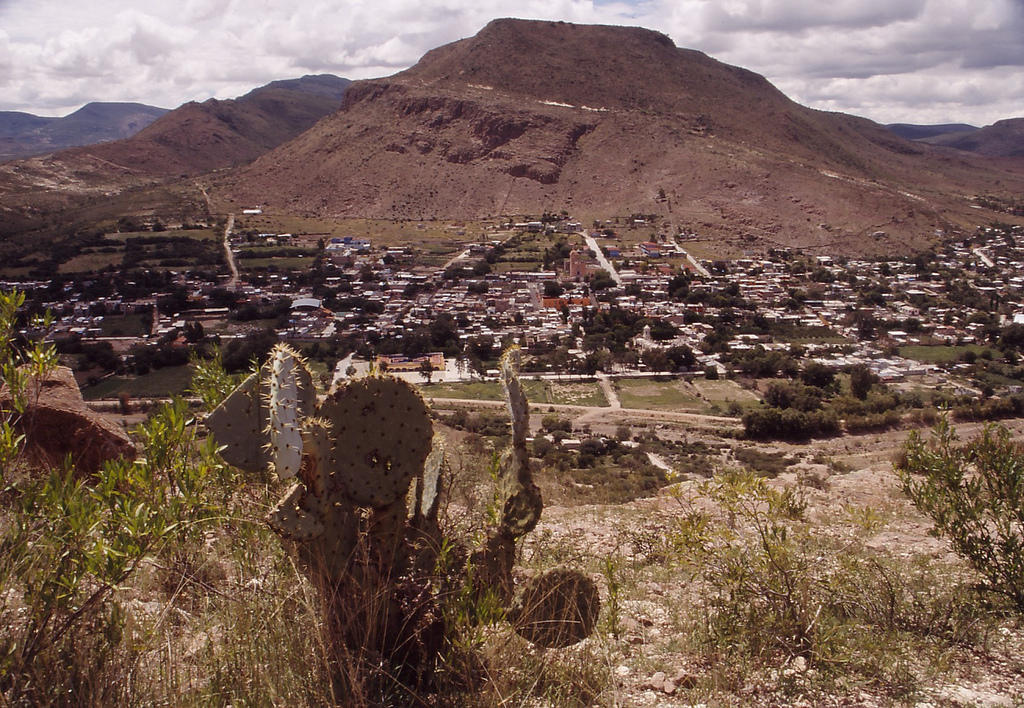

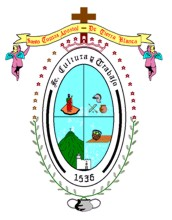
- Coat of arms

- Location in Guanajuato Tierra Blanca (Mexico)
- Country: Mexico
- State: Guanajuato
- Demonym: (in Spanish)
- Time zone: UTC−6 (CST)

Tierra Blanca is a city and municipality in northeastern Guanajuato, Mexico. Covering an area of 391.65 square kilometers (1.09% of the state's total surface area), it shares borders with Santa Catarina to the north, the state of Querétaro to the south and east, San José Iturbide to the west, and Doctor Mora to the northwest. According to the 2005 census, the municipality had a population of 14,515. In pre-Hispanic times, the area now known as Tierra Blanca was primarily inhabited by the Chichimeca people.

Tierra Blanca was established and designated as a municipality in 1536 by order of the first viceroy of New Spain, Antonio de Mendoza, making it one of the oldest municipalities in Guanajuato.

The current municipal president of Tierra Blanca and its smaller outlying communities is Ernesto Reyes Pérez.
