= San Luis de la Paz =

- City and municipality
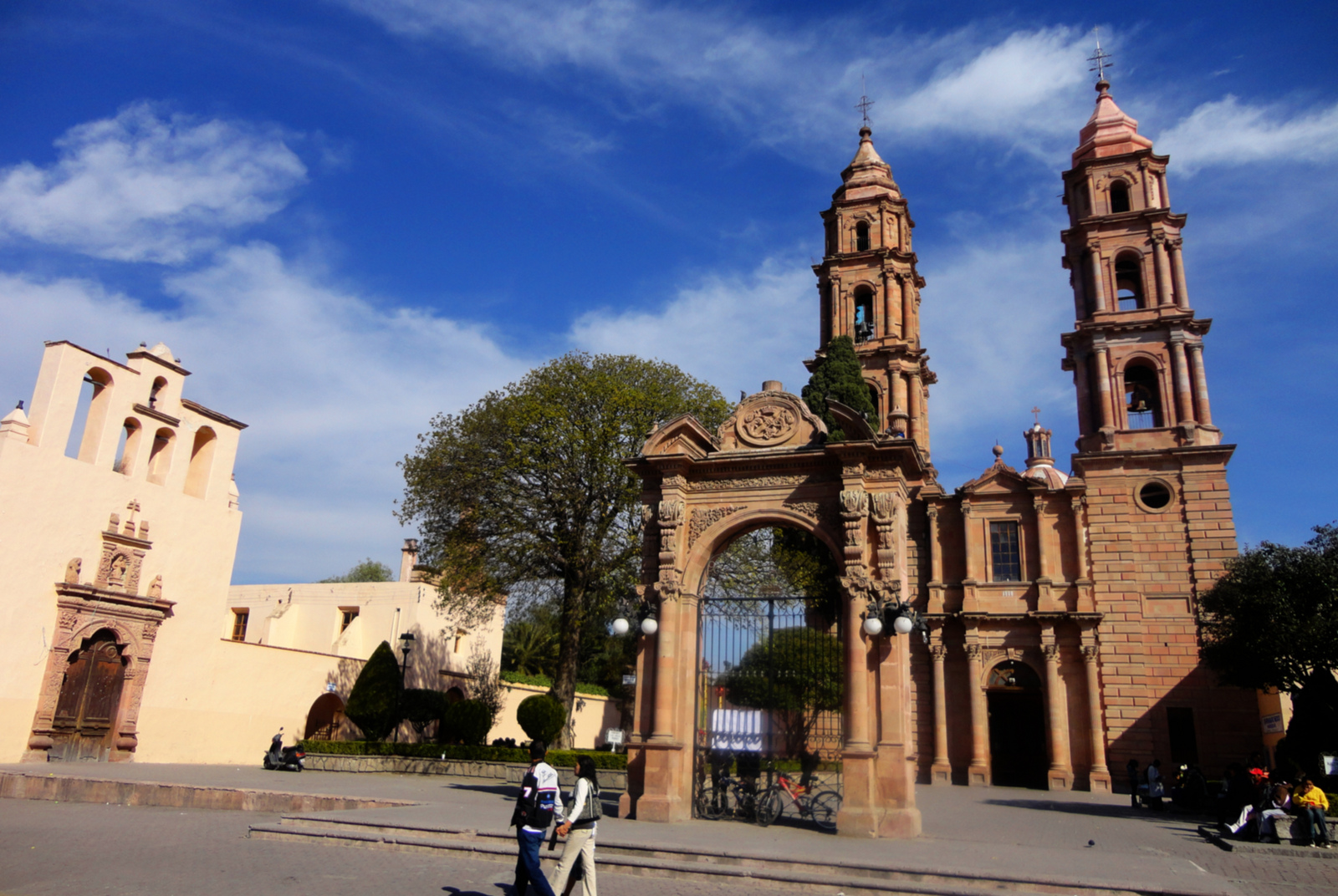

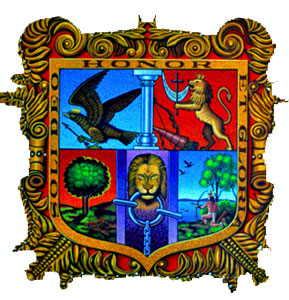
- Coat of arms

- Location in Guanajuato San Luis de la Paz (Mexico)
- Coordinates: 21.29820°N 100.51511°W

Area
  - City: 9.88 km^{2} (3.81 sq mi)
  - Municipality: 2,031 km^{2} (784 sq mi)

Population (2020 census)
  - City: 51,894
  - Density: 5,250/km^{2} (13,600/sq mi)
  - Municipality: 128,536
  - Municipality density: 63.29/km^{2} (163.9/sq mi)
- Website: http://www.sanluisdelapaz.com

San Luis de la Paz is a city, and the surrounding municipality of the same name, located in the northeastern part of the state of Guanajuato in Mexico. San Luis de la Paz was founded on August 25, 1552, as a defensive town on the Spanish Silver Road, which linked the Zacatecas mines with Mexico City during the Spanish domination. It owes its name to the peace treaty between Otomi Indians, who were Spaniard allies, and the native Chichimecas, on the day of Saint Louis of France, August 25. San Luis de la Paz is also known as the Chichimeca Nation.

== Population ==
The municipality lies adjacent to the southern border of the state of San Luis Potosi. The city serves as the seat of the municipality. In the 2020 INEGI census, the city had a population of 51,894. The municipality has an area of 2,031 km^{2} (784 sq mi). Its largest other community is the town of Misión de Chichimecas, with a population of 9,609.

== Tourism ==
San Luis de la Paz is surrounded by many mountains and rock formations, like the Bernalejo hill and the Bridge of God.

The Paso de Vaqueros Canyon is 30 minutes outside the town of San Luis de la Paz. The Manzanares and San Juan Rivers are inside the canyon. Paso de Vaqueros is sought for rappelling, bungee jumping, swimming, rock climbing and hiking.

== Economy ==
San Luis de la Paz is considered to be the most important agricultural and commercial area of the Sierra Gorda (northeast zone) in the state of Guanajuato. Furthermore, it is also considered an ideal location to set up manufacturing firms.

== Climate ==
Climate data for San Luis de la Paz (1991–2020 normals, extremes 1925–present)
Month	Jan	Feb	Mar	Apr	May	Jun	Jul	Aug	Sep	Oct	Nov	Dec	Year
Record high °C (°F)	30 (86)	33.5 (92.3)	35 (95)	37 (99)	40 (104)	41 (106)	39 (102)	39 (102)	35 (95)	35 (95)	44 (111)	30.5 (86.9)	44 (111)
Mean daily maximum °C (°F)	21.9 (71.4)	24.3 (75.7)	26.4 (79.5)	28.9 (84.0)	30.0 (86.0)	28.0 (82.4)	26.8 (80.2)	26.5 (79.7)	25.4 (77.7)	24.7 (76.5)	23.8 (74.8)	22.8 (73.0)	25.8 (78.4)
Daily mean °C (°F)	13.0 (55.4)	15.0 (59.0)	16.9 (62.4)	19.4 (66.9)	20.9 (69.6)	20.4 (68.7)	19.4 (66.9)	19.1 (66.4)	18.5 (65.3)	17.0 (62.6)	15.6 (60.1)	13.9 (57.0)	17.4 (63.3)
Mean daily minimum °C (°F)	4.1 (39.4)	5.8 (42.4)	7.5 (45.5)	9.9 (49.8)	11.9 (53.4)	12.7 (54.9)	11.9 (53.4)	11.6 (52.9)	11.5 (52.7)	9.2 (48.6)	7.3 (45.1)	5.0 (41.0)	9.0 (48.2)
Record low °C (°F)	−7 (19)	−7.3 (18.9)	−4 (25)	0 (32)	0 (32)	3 (37)	4.5 (40.1)	5 (41)	1 (34)	−1.3 (29.7)	−7 (19)	−8 (18)	−8 (18)
Average precipitation mm (inches)	6.0 (0.24)	13.8 (0.54)	11.2 (0.44)	12.5 (0.49)	33.8 (1.33)	77.1 (3.04)	86.4 (3.40)	69.6 (2.74)	77.8 (3.06)	33.8 (1.33)	11.8 (0.46)	5.4 (0.21)	439.2 (17.29)
Average precipitation days (≥ 0.1 mm)	1.2	1.6	2.0	2.4	5.2	8.0	8.4	7.3	8.6	4.9	2.0	1.0	52.6
Source: Servicio Meteorológico Nacional
