= Municipalities of Guanajuato =

List of municipalities of Mexican state

Map of Mexico with Guanajuato highlighted

Guanajuato is a state in central Mexico that is divided into 46 municipalities. According to the 2020 INEGI census, Guanajuato is the sixth most populous state with 6,166,934 inhabitants and the 22nd largest by land area spanning 30,691.61 square kilometres (11,850.10 sq mi).

Municipalities in Guanajuato are administratively autonomous of the state according to the 115th article of the 1917 Constitution of Mexico. Every three years, citizens elect a municipal president (Spanish: presidente municipal) by a plurality voting system who heads a concurrently elected municipal council (ayuntamiento) responsible for providing all the public services for their constituents. The municipal council consists of a variable number of trustees and councillors (regidores y síndicos). Municipalities are responsible for public services (such as water and sewerage), street lighting, public safety, traffic, and the maintenance of public parks, gardens and cemeteries. They may also assist the state and federal governments in education, emergency fire and medical services, environmental protection and maintenance of monuments and historical landmarks. Since 1984, they have had the power to collect property taxes and user fees, although more funds are obtained from the state and federal governments than from their own income.

The largest municipality by population in Guanajuato and third largest in Mexico is León, with 1,721,215 residents or approximately 27.9% of the state population. The smallest municipality by population is Atarjea with 5,296 residents. The largest municipality by land area is San Felipe which spans 3,014.92 km^{2} (1,164.07 sq mi), and the smallest is Pueblo Nuevo which spans 60.05 km^{2} (23.18 sq mi). The first state constitution, Constitución Política del Estado Libre de Guanajuato, resulted in the formation of the first 17 municipalities in Guanajuato on April 15, 1826. The newest municipality is Doctor Mora, incorporated on September 22, 1935.

== Municipalities ==
Municipalities in Guanajuato

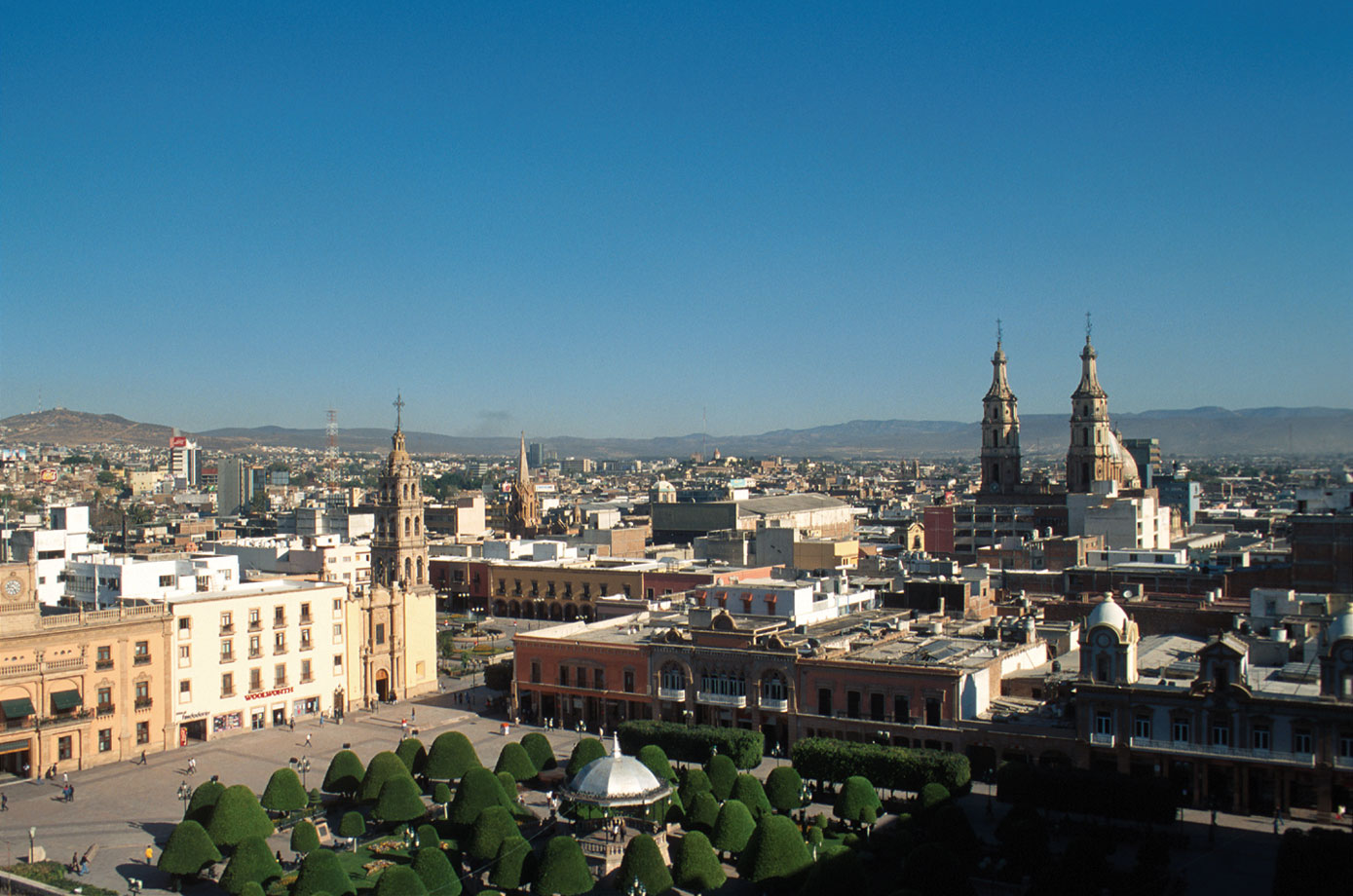
León, Guanajuato's largest municipality by population

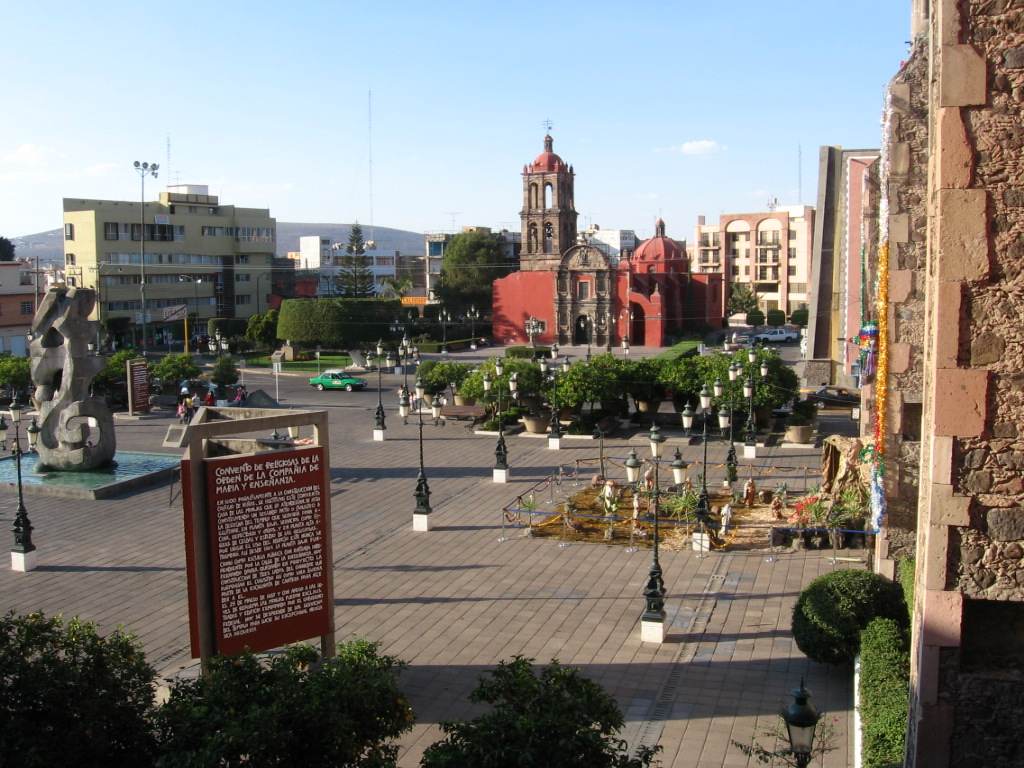
Irapuato, second largest municipality by population.

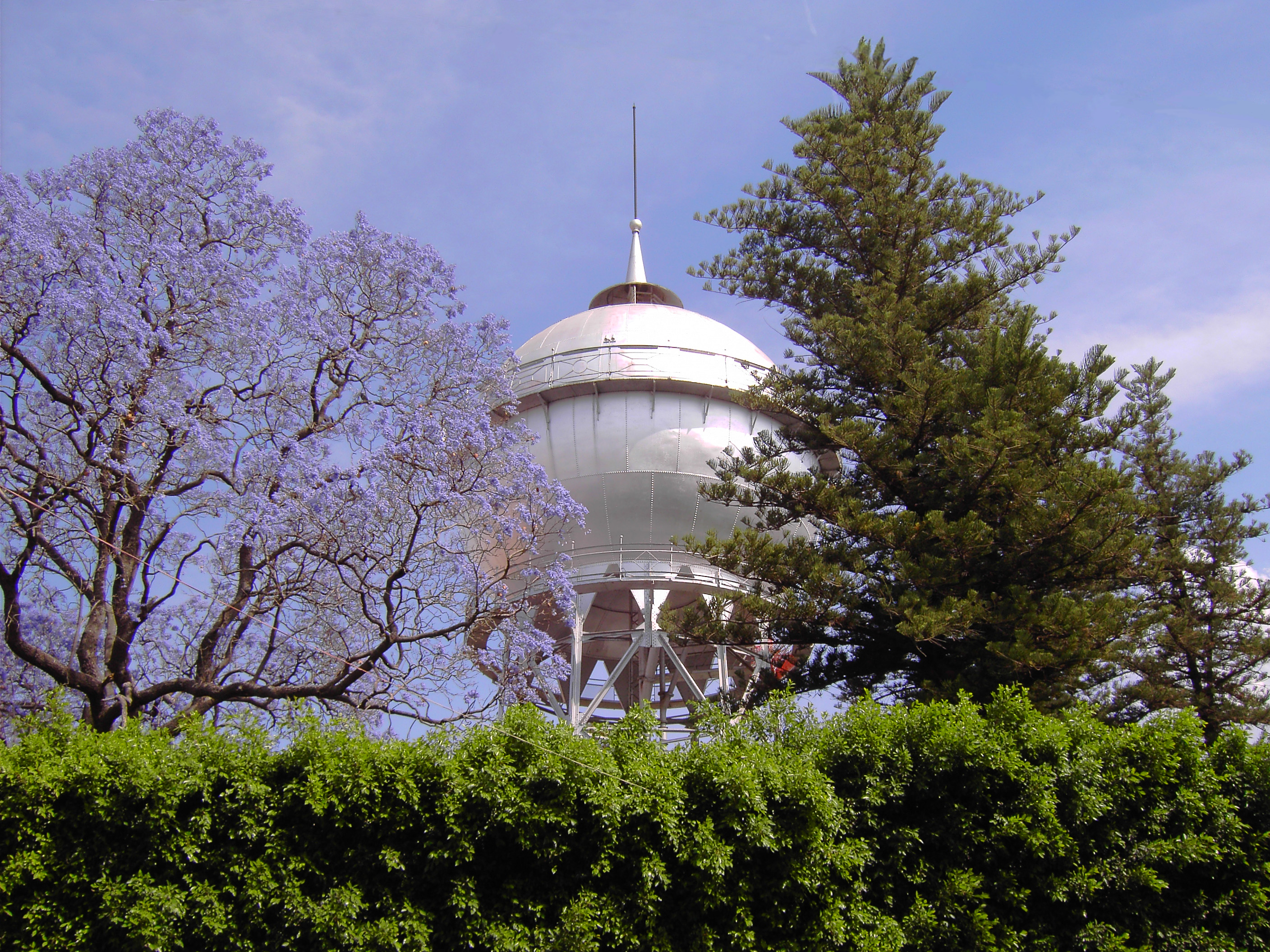
Celaya, third largest municipality by population.

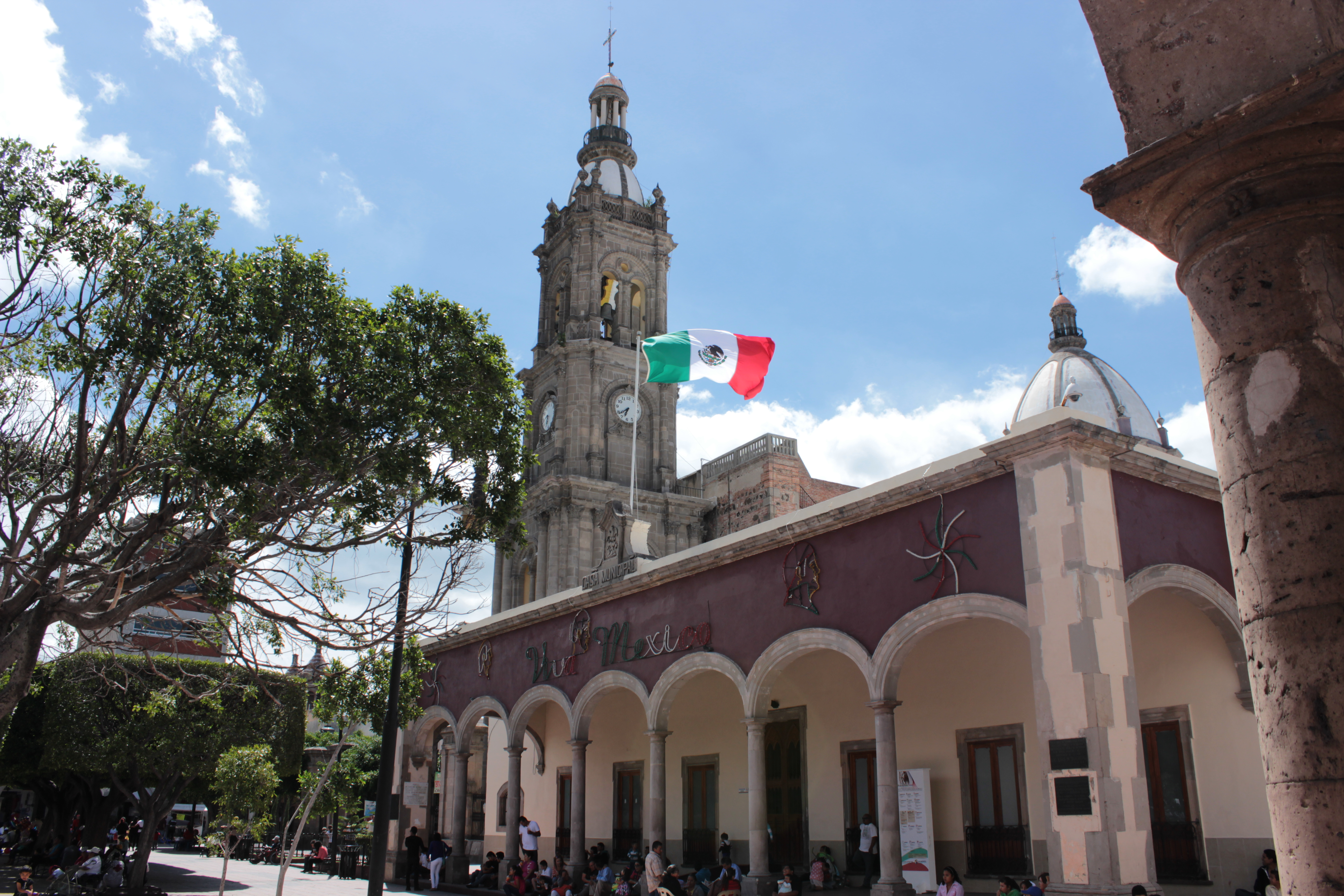
Salamanca, fourth largest municipality by population.

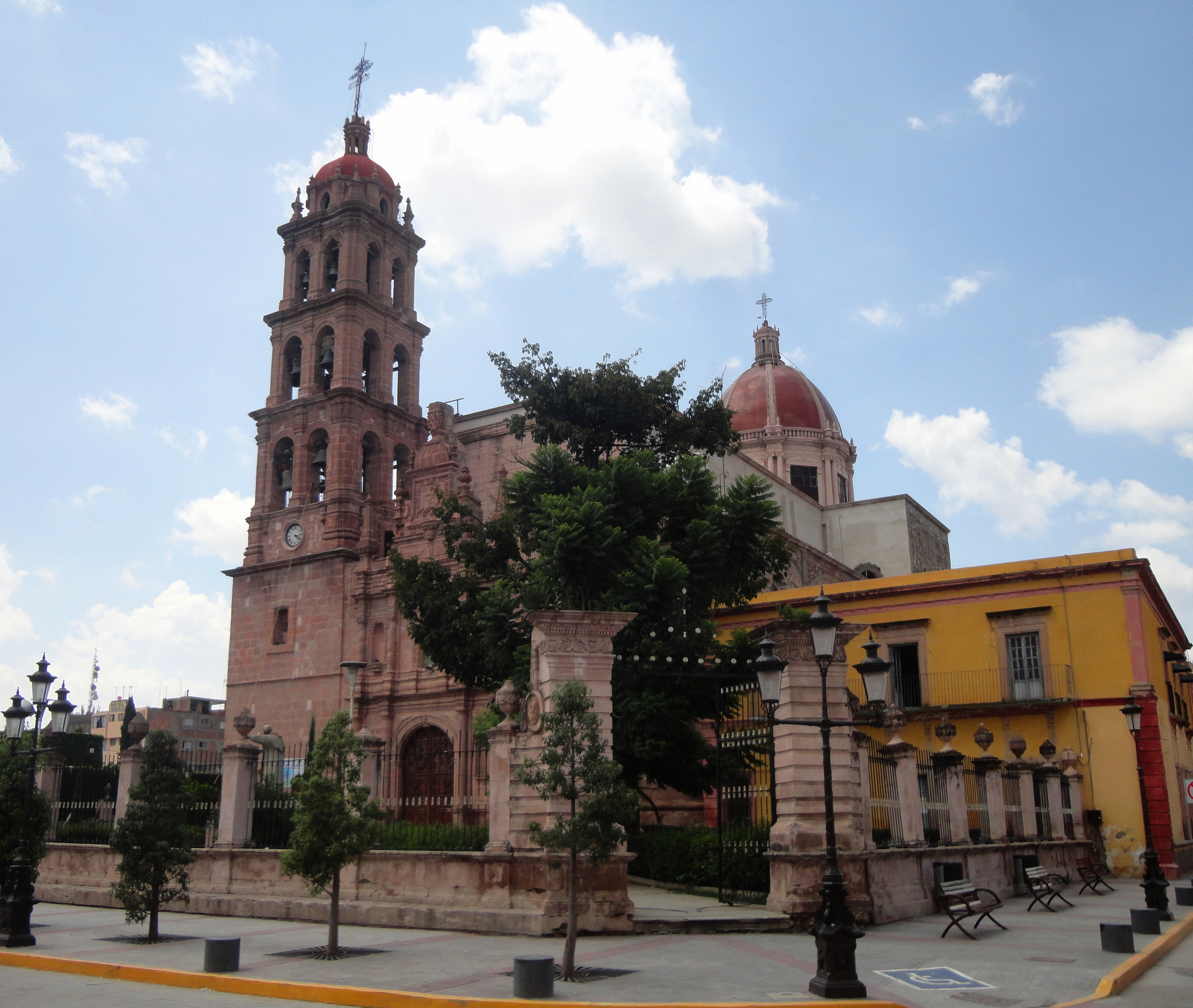
Silao, fifth largest municipality by population.

Guanajuato, capital city and sixth largest municipality by population.

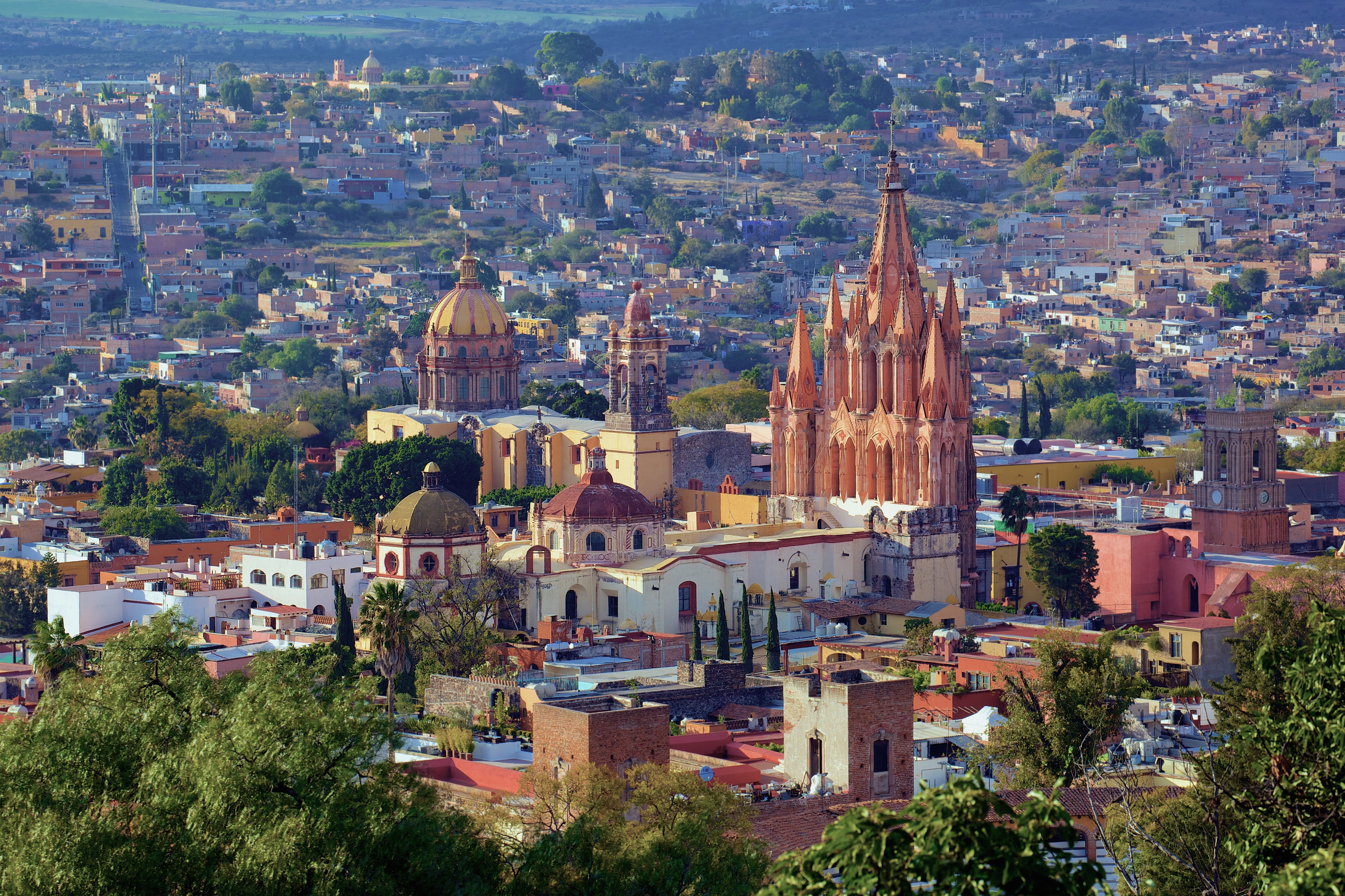
San Miguel de Allende, seventh largest municipality by population.

† State capital

Municipalities of Guanajuato
Name	Municipal seat	Population (2020)	Population (2010)	Change	Land area		Population density (2020)	Incorporation date
Name	Municipal seat	Population (2020)	Population (2010)	Change	km^{2}	sq mi	Population density (2020)	Incorporation date
Abasolo	Abasolo	92,040	84,332	+9.1%	617.05	238.24	149.2/km^{2} (386.3/sq mi)	January 14, 1870
Acámbaro	Acámbaro	108,697	109,030	−0.3%	880.31	339.89	123.5/km^{2} (319.8/sq mi)	April 14, 1826
Apaseo el Alto	Apaseo el Alto	63,392	64,433	−1.6%	374.95	144.77	169.1/km^{2} (437.9/sq mi)	May 16, 1885
Apaseo el Grande (Note: The municipality's name was changed from Apaseo on February 22, 1957 to avoid confusion with the neighboring municipality of Apaseo el Alto.)	Apaseo el Grande	117,883	85,319	+38.2%	421.60	162.78	279.6/km^{2} (724.2/sq mi)	April 14, 1826
Atarjea	Atarjea	5,296	5,610	−5.6%	314.93	121.59	16.8/km^{2} (43.6/sq mi)	May 16, 1885
Celaya	Celaya	521,169	468,469	+11.2%	554.62	214.14	939.7/km^{2} (2,433.8/sq mi)	April 14, 1826
Comonfort (Note: The municipality's name was changed from Chamacuero on December 20, 1891.)	Comonfort	82,216	77,794	+5.7%	490.03	189.20	167.8/km^{2} (434.5/sq mi)	May 16, 1885
Coroneo	Coroneo	11,083	11,691	−5.2%	124.16	47.94	89.3/km^{2} (231.2/sq mi)	May 16, 1885
Cortazar	Cortazar	97,928	88,397	+10.8%	336.16	129.79	291.3/km^{2} (754.5/sq mi)	May 16, 1885
Cuerámaro (Note: The municipality's name was changed from Cuerámaro de Degollado on July 7, 1968.)	Cuerámaro	30,857	27,308	+13.0%	261.05	100.79	118.2/km^{2} (306.1/sq mi)	May 16, 1885
Doctor Mora (Note: The municipality's name was changed from Charcas on July 7, 1968.)	Doctor Mora	27,390	23,324	+17.4%	231.44	89.36	118.3/km^{2} (306.5/sq mi)	September 22, 1935
Dolores Hidalgo (Note: The municipality's full name is Dolores Hidalgo, Cuna de la Independencia Nacional.)	Dolores Hidalgo	163,038	148,173	+10.0%	1,660.25	641.03	98.2/km^{2} (254.3/sq mi)	April 14, 1826
Guanajuato†	Guanajuato	194,500	171,709	+13.3%	1,016.92	392.64	191.3/km^{2} (495.4/sq mi)	April 14, 1826
Huanímaro	Huanímaro	21,128	20,117	+5.0%	127.89	49.38	165.2/km^{2} (427.9/sq mi)	December 20, 1891
Irapuato	Irapuato	592,953	529,440	+12.0%	853.44	329.52	694.8/km^{2} (1,799.5/sq mi)	April 14, 1826
Jaral del Progreso	Jaral del Progreso	38,782	36,584	+6.0%	175.89	67.91	220.5/km^{2} (571.1/sq mi)	July 1, 1913
Jerécuaro	Jerécuaro	49,517	50,832	−2.6%	885.61	341.94	55.9/km^{2} (144.8/sq mi)	July 18, 1827
León	León	1,721,215	1,436,480	+19.8%	1,224.91	472.94	1,405.2/km^{2} (3,639.4/sq mi)	April 14, 1826
Manuel Doblado (Note: The municipality's name was changed from San Pedro Piedra Gorda December 16, 1899.)	Ciudad Manuel Doblado	41,240	37,145	+11.0%	822.14	317.43	50.2/km^{2} (129.9/sq mi)	April 14, 1826
Moroleón	Moroleón	47,261	49,364	−4.3%	160.21	61.86	295.0/km^{2} (764.0/sq mi)	July 13, 1877
Ocampo	Ocampo	26,383	22,683	+16.3%	1,029.01	397.30	25.6/km^{2} (66.4/sq mi)	May 16, 1885
Pénjamo	Pénjamo	154,960	149,936	+3.4%	1,565.52	604.45	99.0/km^{2} (256.4/sq mi)	April 14, 1826
Pueblo Nuevo	Pueblo Nuevo	12,403	11,169	+11.0%	60.05	23.18	206.6/km^{2} (535.0/sq mi)	May 16, 1885
Purísima del Rincón	Purísima de Bustos	83,842	68,795	+21.9%	291.49	112.54	287.6/km^{2} (745.0/sq mi)	March 22, 1867
Romita	Romita	65,766	56,655	+16.1%	441.94	170.63	148.8/km^{2} (385.4/sq mi)	May 16, 1885
Salamanca	Salamanca	273,417	260,732	+4.9%	757.73	292.56	360.8/km^{2} (934.6/sq mi)	April 14, 1826
Salvatierra	Salvatierra	94,126	97,054	−3.0%	594.58	229.57	158.3/km^{2} (410.0/sq mi)	April 14, 1826
San Diego de la Unión	San Diego de la Unión	41,054	37,103	+10.6%	1,015.81	392.21	40.4/km^{2} (104.7/sq mi)	May 16, 1885
San Felipe	San Felipe	119,793	106,952	+12.0%	3,014.92	1,164.07	39.7/km^{2} (102.9/sq mi)	April 14, 1826
San Francisco del Rincón	San Francisco del Rincón	130,871	113,570	+15.2%	426.56	164.69	306.8/km^{2} (794.6/sq mi)	March 22, 1867
San José Iturbide	San José Iturbide	89,558	72,411	+23.7%	549.67	212.23	162.9/km^{2} (422.0/sq mi)	December 3, 1849
San Luis de la Paz	San Luis de la Paz	128,536	115,656	+11.1%	2,036.79	786.41	63.1/km^{2} (163.4/sq mi)	April 14, 1826
San Miguel de Allende	San Miguel de Allende	174,615	160,383	+8.9%	1,558.14	601.60	112.1/km^{2} (290.3/sq mi)	April 14, 1826
Santa Catarina	Santa Catarina	5,723	5,120	+11.8%	195.30	75.40	29.3/km^{2} (75.9/sq mi)	May 16, 1885
Santa Cruz de Juventino Rosas	Santa Cruz de Juventino Rosas	82,340	79,214	+3.9%	430.29	166.14	191.4/km^{2} (495.6/sq mi)	May 16, 1885
Santiago Maravatío	Santiago Maravatío	6,714	6,670	+0.7%	83.86	32.38	80.1/km^{2} (207.4/sq mi)	May 16, 1885
Silao de la Victoria	Silao de la Victoria	203,556	173,024	+17.6%	540.01	208.50	376.9/km^{2} (976.3/sq mi)	April 14, 1826
Tarandacuao (Note: The municipality's name was changed from Tarandacuao de la Constancia July 28, 1989.)	Tarandacuao	11,304	11,641	−2.9%	121.14	46.77	93.3/km^{2} (241.7/sq mi)	May 16, 1885
Tarimoro	Tarimoro	35,905	35,571	+0.9%	335.18	129.42	107.1/km^{2} (277.4/sq mi)	May 16, 1885
Tierra Blanca	Tierra Blanca	20,007	18,175	+10.1%	410.48	158.49	48.7/km^{2} (126.2/sq mi)	May 16, 1885
Uriangato	Uriangato	61,494	59,305	+3.7%	116.68	45.05	527.1/km^{2} (1,365.1/sq mi)	May 16, 1885
Valle de Santiago	Valle de Santiago	150,054	141,058	+6.4%	821.98	317.37	182.6/km^{2} (472.8/sq mi)	April 14, 1826
Victoria	Victoria	21,253	19,820	+7.2%	1,050.19	405.48	20.2/km^{2} (52.4/sq mi)	December 3, 1849
Villagrán	Villagrán	65,791	55,782	+17.9%	128.85	49.75	510.6/km^{2} (1,322.5/sq mi)	July 20, 1930
Xichú	Xichú	11,143	11,560	−3.6%	913.65	352.76	12.2/km^{2} (31.6/sq mi)	May 16, 1885
Yuriria (Yuririapúndaro)	Yuriria	68,741	70,782	−2.9%	668.25	258.01	102.9/km^{2} (266.4/sq mi)	April 14, 1826
Guanajuato	—	6,166,934	5,486,372	+12.4%	30,691.61	11,850.10	200.9/km^{2} (520.4/sq mi)	—
Mexico	—	126,014,024	112,336,538	+12.2%	1,972,550	761,606	63.9/km^{2} (165.5/sq mi)	—
