= Romita =

- City and municipality
- Municipal of Romita
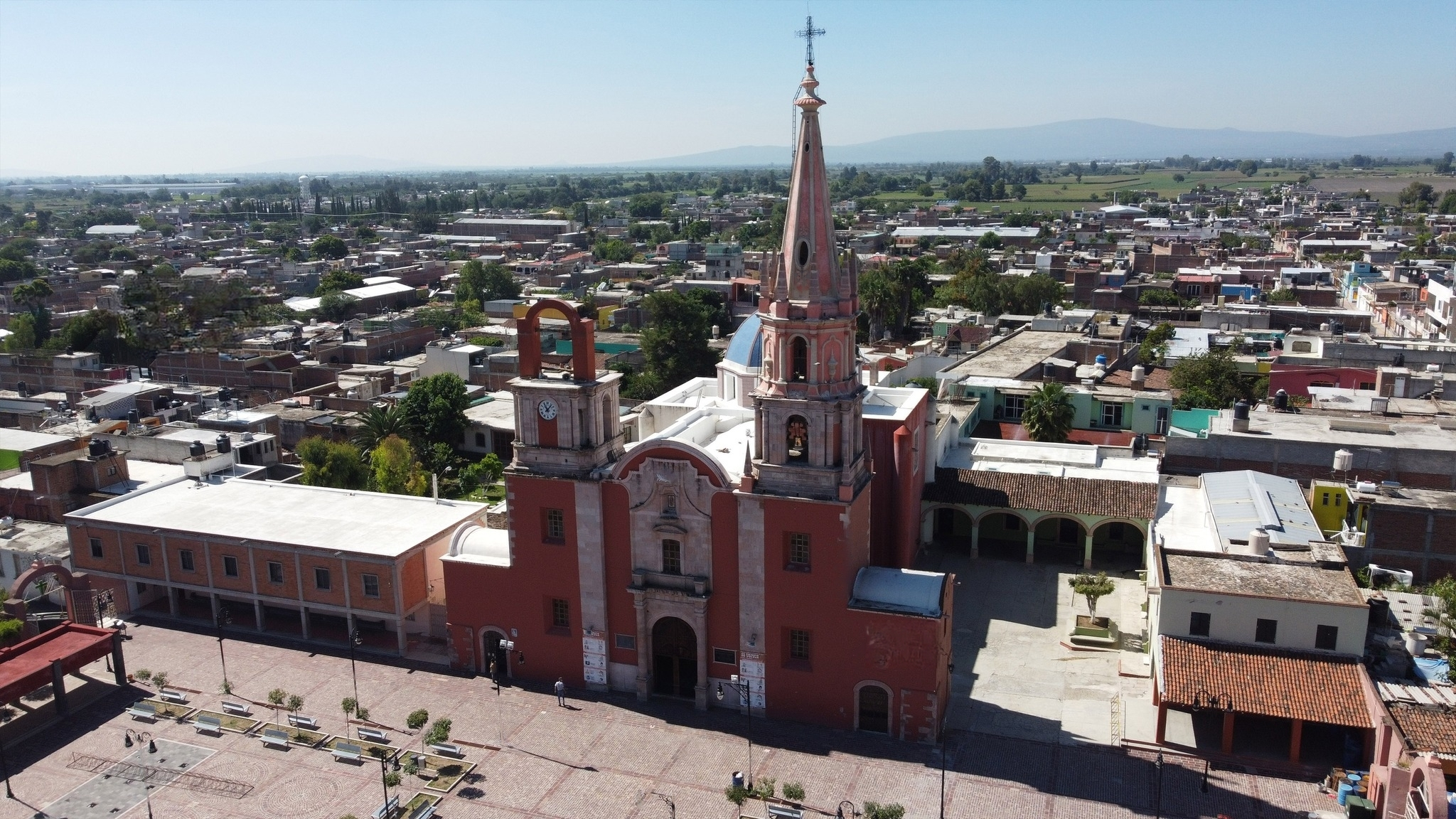
- View of Romita Largest Parish's

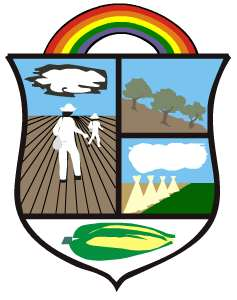
- Coat of arms
- Location of Romita within Guanajuato
- Location within Guanajuato Location within the United Mexican States
- Coordinates: 20°52′15″N 101°31′01″W
- Country: Mexico
- State: Guanajuato
- Region: West Centro
- Municipality: Romita
- Foundation: May 16, 1885
- Founder: Don Pascual Peñaranda; Ignacio Maza Rivas; Friar Manuel Almorrosta

Government
  - Municipal President: Pedro Kiyoshi Tanamachi Reyes (PAN)

Population (2020 census)
  - City and municipality: 65,766
  - Urban: 65,766
- Time zone: UTC−6 (CST)
- Postal code: 36200
- Website: www.romita.gob.mx

Romita is a Mexican city (and municipality) located in the Southwest region of the state of Guanajuato. The municipality has an area of 442.10 square kilometres (1.46% of the surface of the state) and is bordered to the north by León, to the east by Silao, to the southwest by Abasolo and Cuerámaro, and to the west by Manuel Doblado and San Francisco del Rincón. The municipality had a population of 105,825 inhabitants according to the 2005 census.

The municipal president of Romita is Pedro Kiyoshi Tanamachi Reyes.
