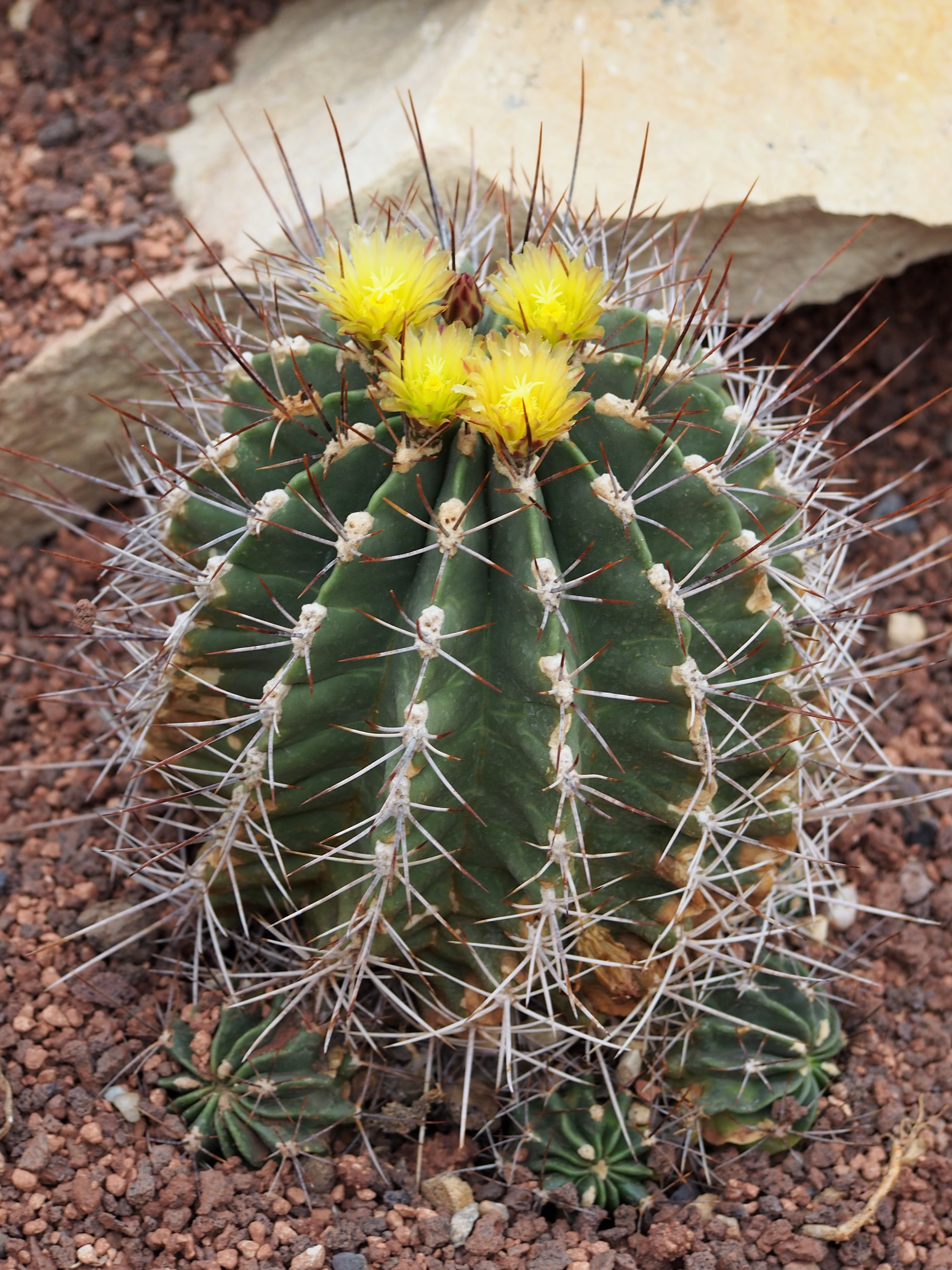

Conservation status
- Least Concern (IUCN 3.1)

Scientific classification
- Kingdom: Plantae
- Clade: Tracheophytes
- Clade: Angiosperms
- Clade: Eudicots
- Order: Caryophyllales
- Family: Cactaceae
- Subfamily: Cactoideae
- Genus: Ferocactus
- Species: F. echidne

Binomial name
- Ferocactus echidne (DC.) Britton & Rose

Synonyms
- Echinocactus echidne DC. 1834; Echinofossulocactus echidne (DC.) Lawr. 1841; Parrycactus echidne (DC.) Doweld 2000; Echinocactus dolichacanthus Lem. 1838; Echinocactus dolichacanthus var. minor Lem. 1839; Echinocactus echidne f. gilvus (A.Dietr.) K.Schum. 1898; Echinocactus echidne var. gilvus (A.Dietr.) Salm-Dyck 1850; Echinocactus gilvus A.Dietr. 1845; Echinocactus rafaelensis J.A.Purpus 1912; Echinocactus vanderaeyi Lem. 1838; Echinocactus victoriensis Rose 1909; Echinofossulocactus vanderaeyi (Lem.) Lawr. 1841; Echinofossulocactus vanderaeyi var. ignotus-longispinus Lawr. 1841; Ferocactus echidne var. rhodanthus G.Unger 2003; Ferocactus echidne subsp. victoriensis (Rose) Lodé 2020 publ. 2022; Ferocactus echidne var. victoriensis (Rose) G.E.Linds. 1955; Ferocactus rafaelensis (J.A.Purpus) Borg 1937; Ferocactus victoriensis (Rose) Backeb. 1961

= Ferocactus echidne =

Species of cactus

Ferocactus echidne is a barrel cactus in the genus Ferocactus. It is found in nature in Mexico. This cactus is known commonly as Sonora barrel, Coville's barrel cactus, Emory's barrel cactus, and traveler's friend. This plant is often sold as a houseplant.

Ferocactus echidne are succulents, classified under the Cactaceae family. Succulent leaves are modified leaves that allow plants to store water for survival in dry environments. Leaves are thick, fleshy and shaped to reduce surface area, an advantageous factor for water conservation and CO_{2} uptake capacity.

== Description ==
Ferocactus echidne is a small to medium-sized cactus that grows alone or in clusters. Its flattened to cylindrical shoots are typically cloudy to gray-green, reaching heights of 12 to 35 cm (4.7 to 13.8 in) and diameters of 12 to 20 cm (4.7 to 7.9 in). The plant has 13 to 21 sharp, ribbed ridges without tubercles. Its thin, amber-colored spines are needle-like and smooth, with a single central spine up to 5 cm (2.0 in) long, and seven to nine shorter, radiating marginal spines.

At the top of its shoots, the cactus produces funnel-shaped flowers, yellow or red, 2 to 4.5 cm (0.79 to 1.77 in) long and 3 to 3.5 cm (1.2 to 1.4 in) in diameter. Its fruits are spherical to egg-shaped, light green or white with pinkish or red hues, fleshy, and growing up to 2 cm (0.79 in) long.

Ferocactus echidne possess morphological modifications that allow them to live in environments that may be harsh to most plants. They have thick bulky bodies that allow them to store and conserve water. The stems are thick, globular, and fleshy to aid in water storage, photosynthesis, and structural support. The ribbed structure allows the stem to expand for water absorption and contract during dry periods. The epidermis is covered by a thick waxy cuticle that helps reduce water loss and aid in protection.The spines that cover the cactus are modified leaves to protect the plant and reduce water loss due to their small size and surface area. The spines develop from areoles, which is where also the flowers develop. Flowers sprout on the top to attract pollinators and enable sexual reproduction. Flowers have male and female reproductive structures and an inferior ovary. Reproduction is done sexually by means of pollination, fertilization of ovary and ovules, and the development of seeds.

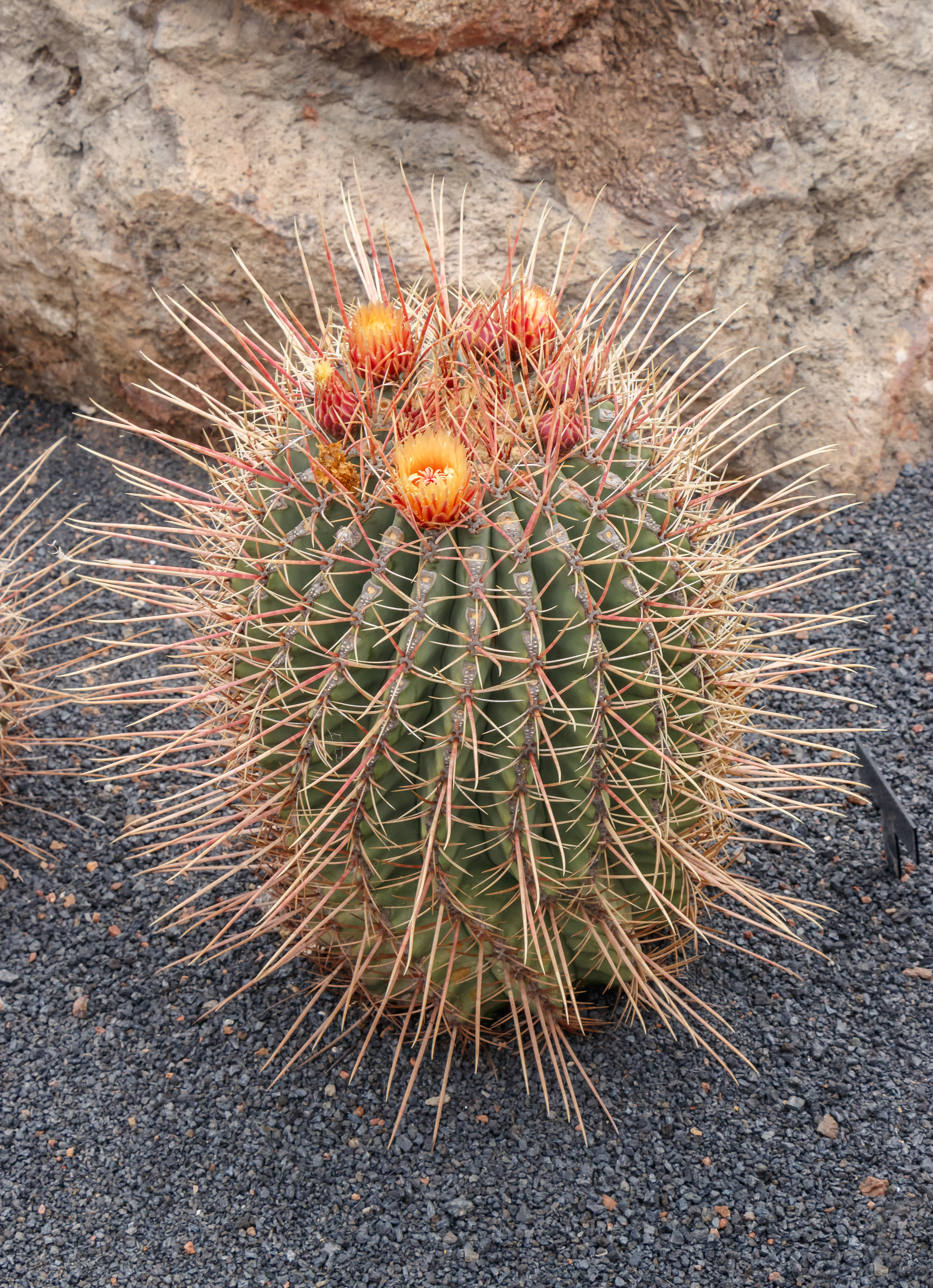
Orange flower plant

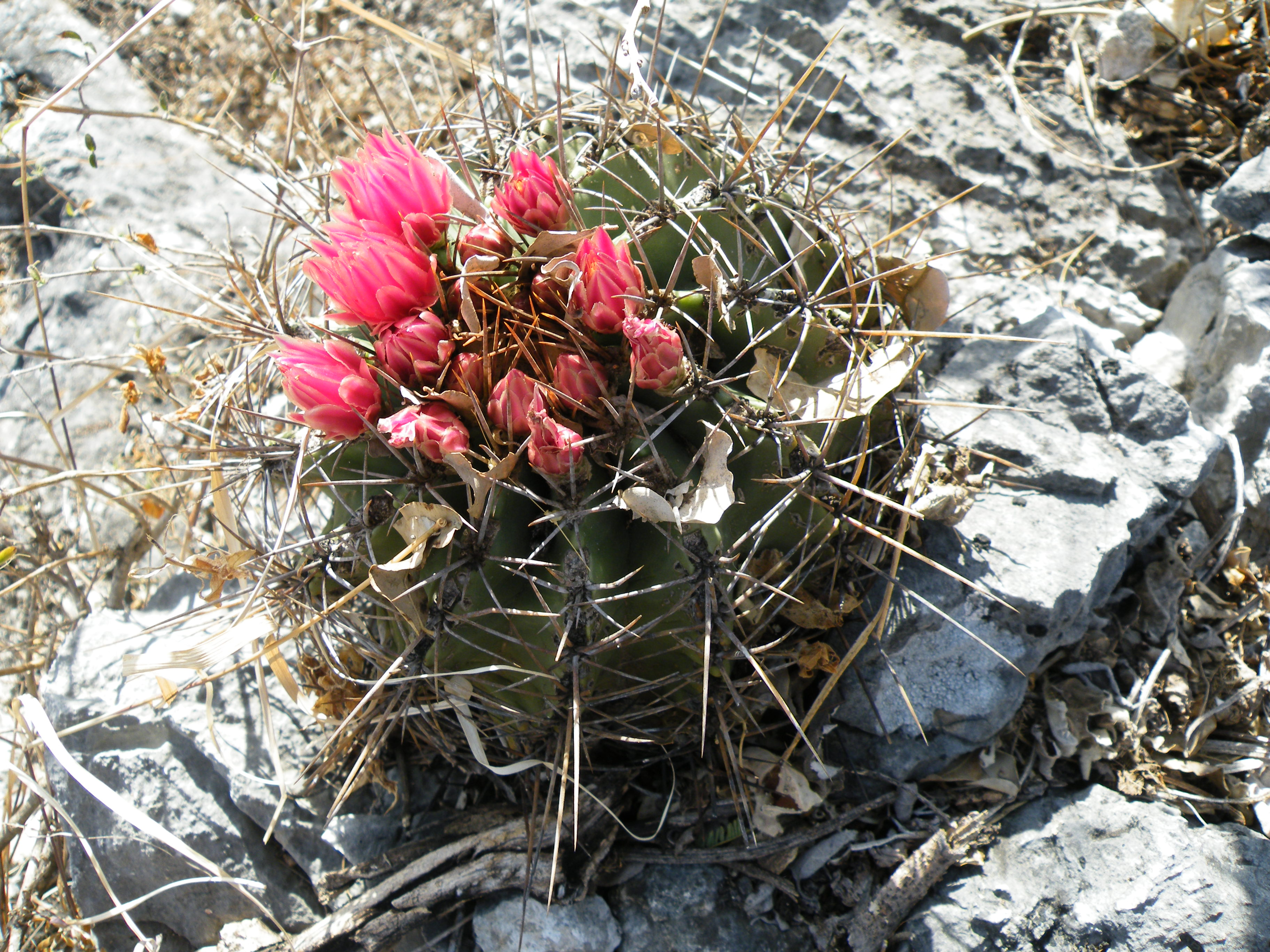
Plant with red flowers

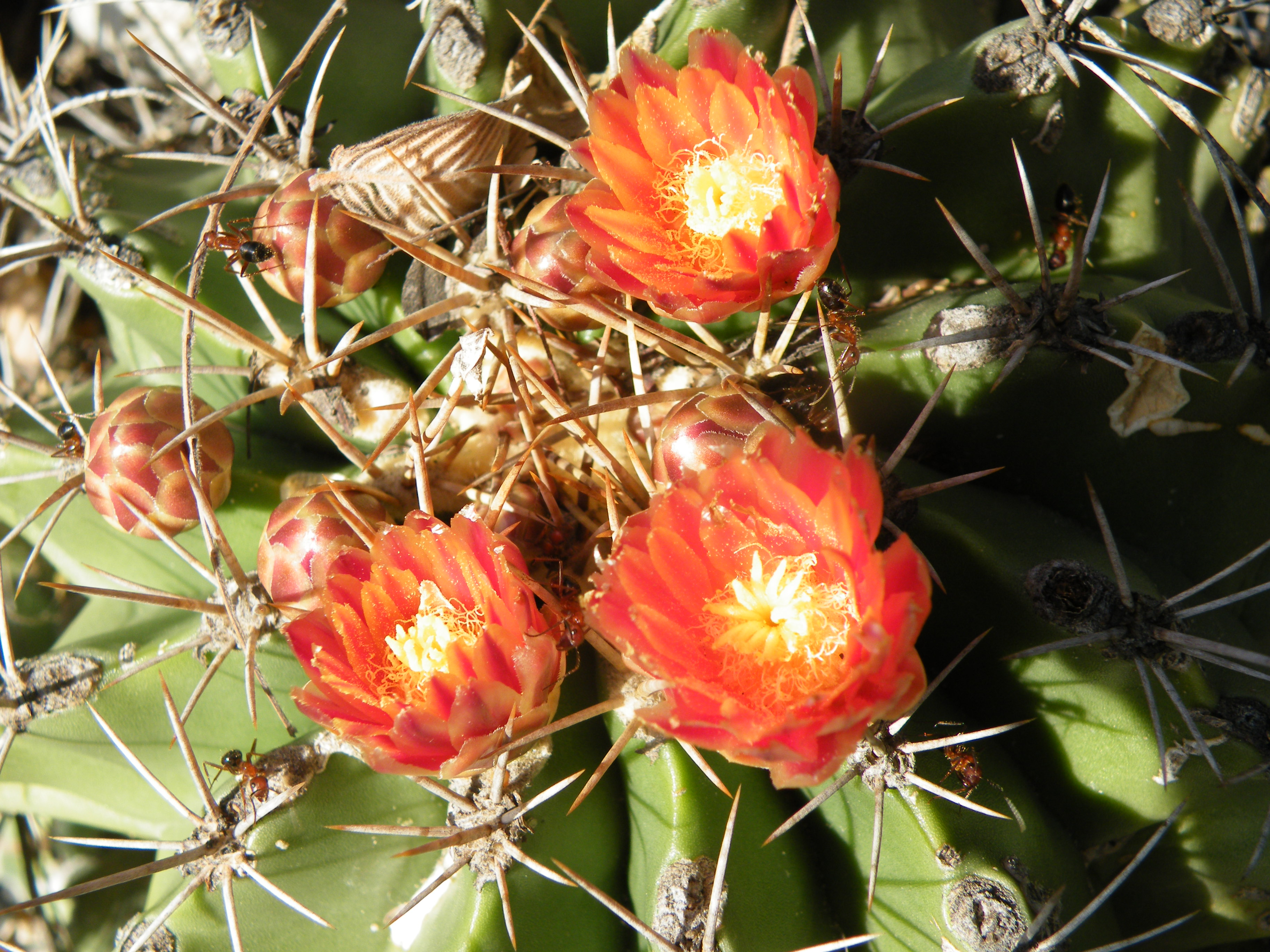
Flowers closeup

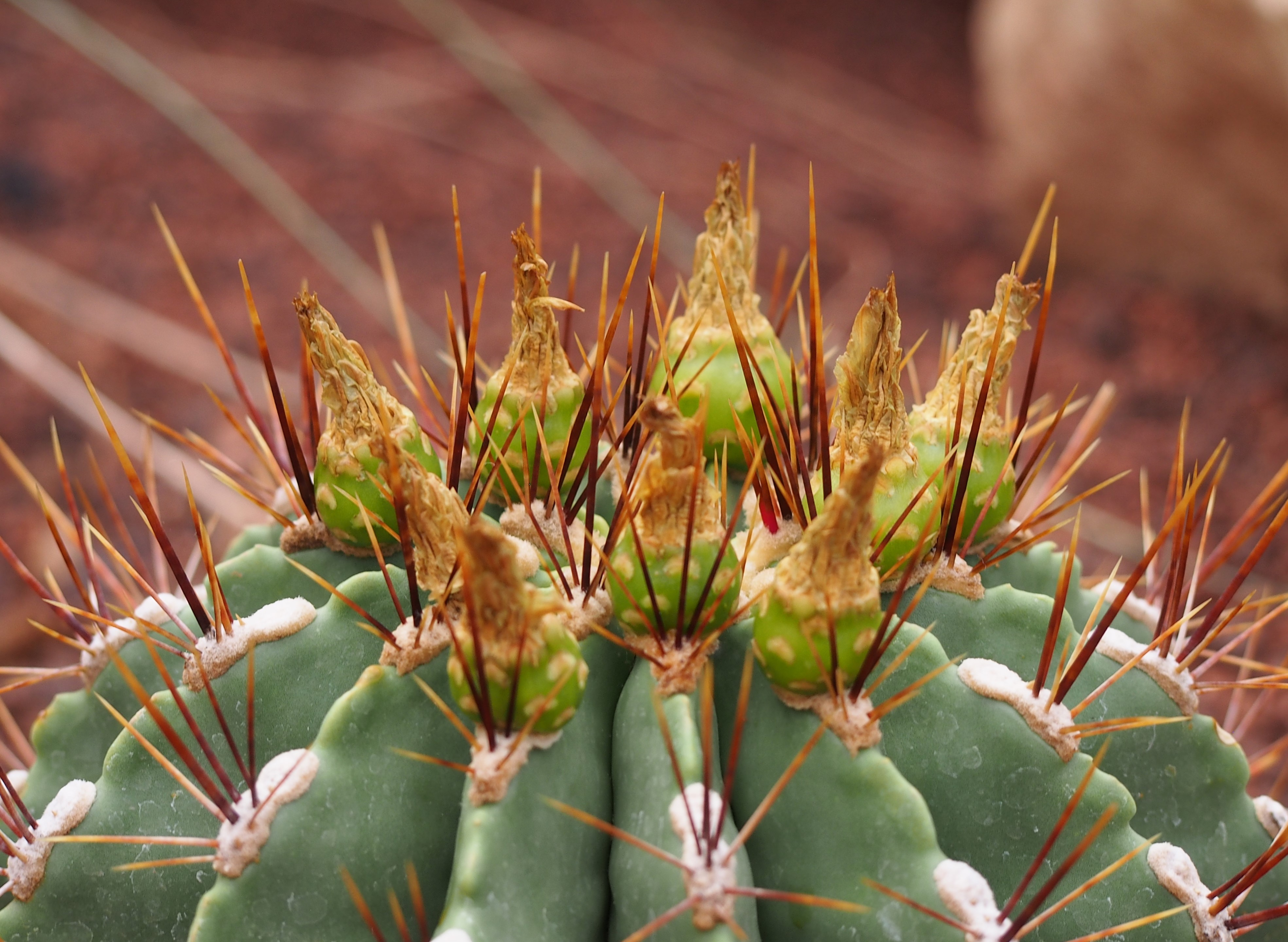
Fruits

== Distribution ==
Ferocactus echidna grows in limestone soil in the bushlands and tropical forests at elevations of 300 to 1860 meters in Mexico's Hidalgo, San Luis Potosí, Queretaro, Nuevo León, Tamaulipas, and Guanajuato states.

== Habitat ==
Ferocactus echidne are native to regions in Mexico, in hot, dry environments that experience low and uneven rainfall. Natural habitats normally consist of low humidity and high temperatures. Seasons may also experience short periods of moisture along with drought like conditions. Water loss and gas exchange are controlled and limited. Transpiration is nocturnal meaning the stomata will open at night and close during the day, which is done by the process Crassulacean acid metabolism (CAM). The plant has a system of fibrous lateral roots for absorption. The roots are shallow so that while moisture is present it’s able to collect it from the soil and transfer to the stem where it’s stored.

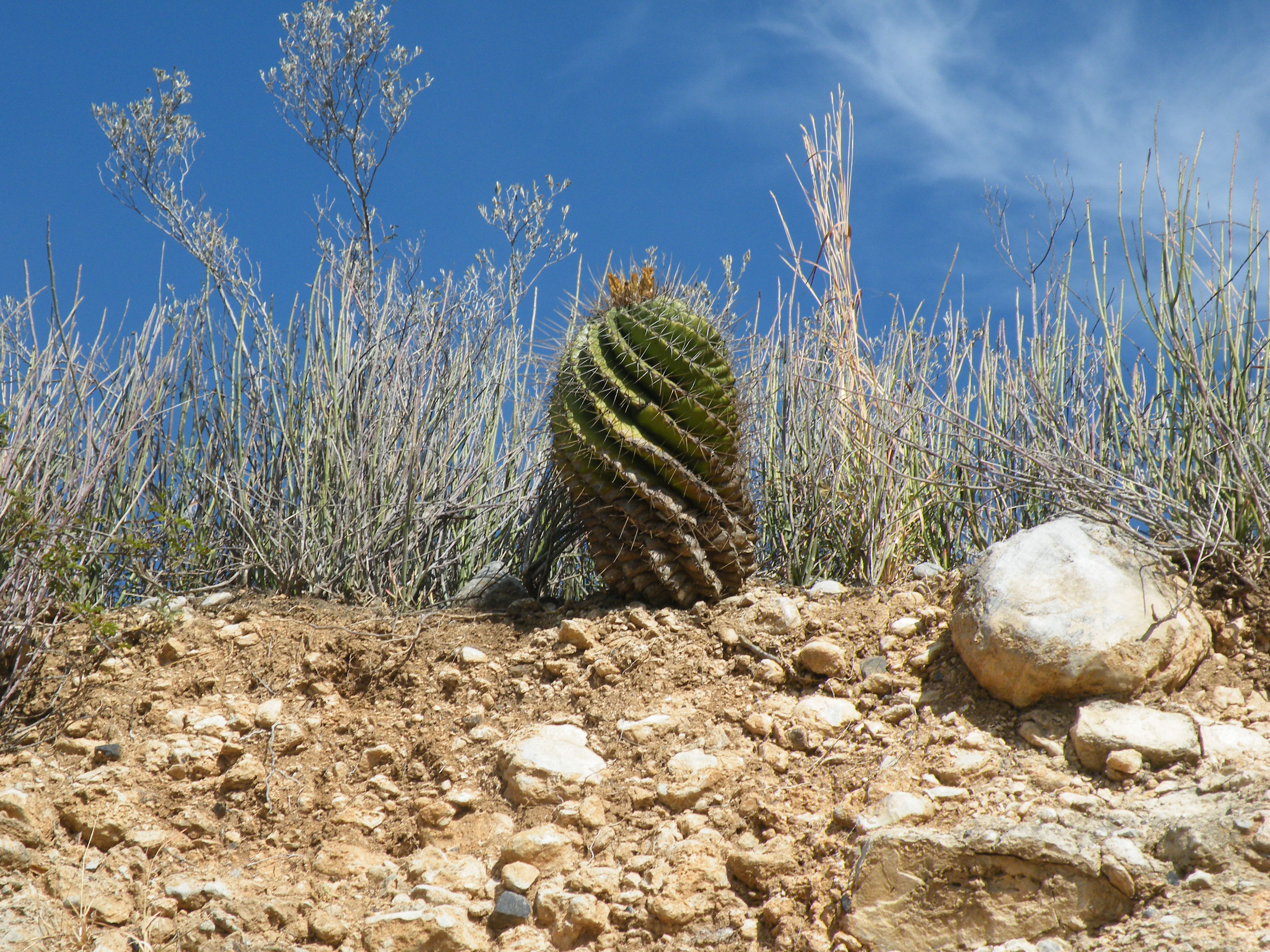
Plant growing in La Reforma Near, González Municipality, Tamaulipas

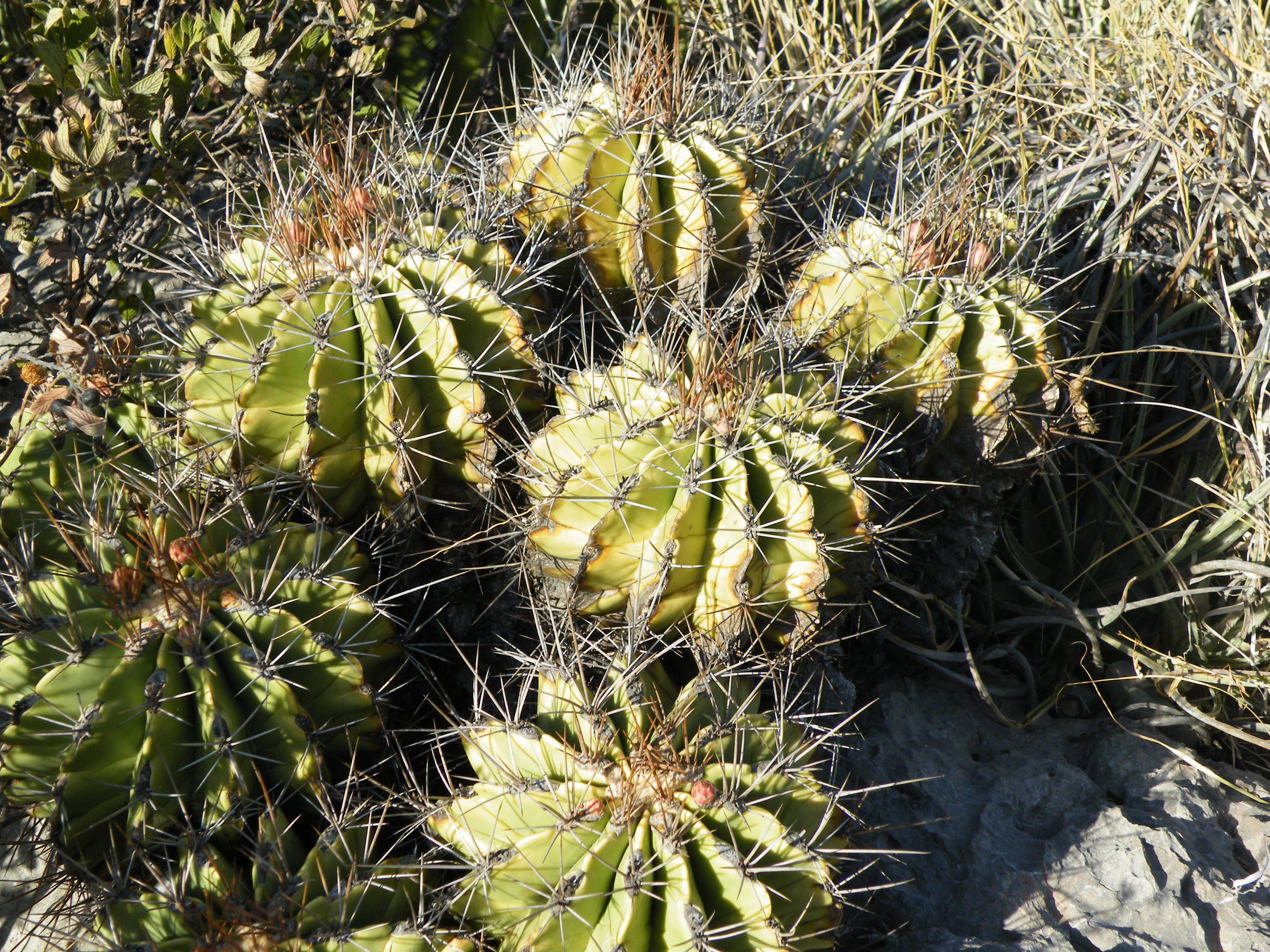
Habitat in San Luis Potosí, Mexico

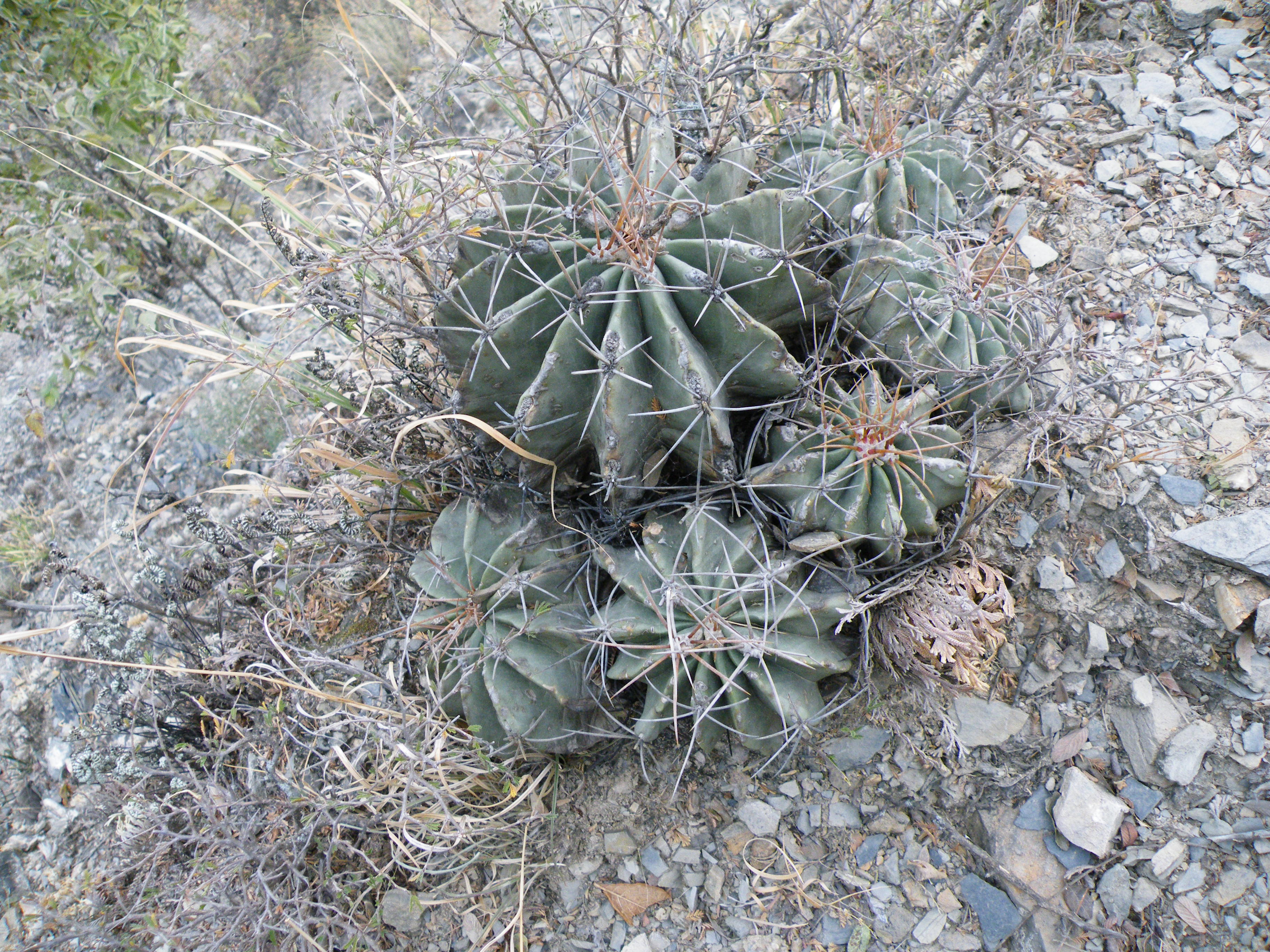
Plant growing in Xichu, Guanajuato

== Taxonomy ==
Ferocactus echidne, described by Augustin-Pyrame de Candolle in 1834 as Echinocactus echidne, gets its species name "echidne" from Latin, meaning "snake," though its precise significance remains uncertain. In 1922, Nathaniel Lord Britton and Joseph Nelson Rose reclassified this species under the genus Ferocactus. Alternatively it has been assigned the binomials Echinocactus emoryi, Ferocactus rectispinus, and Ferocactus covillei.

== Uses ==
Researchers investigated the potential medicinal properties of Ferocactus echidne. The outcome of this study showed that the ethanol extracts from its stem exhibit antioxidant activity. It also expressed antimicrobial effects against certain bacterial and fungal strains. More research is required to establish its safety and potential medicinal use.
