= Jorge Valadéz =

Mexican footballer (born 1996)

Personal information
- Full name: Jorge Alfredo Valadéz Callente
- Date of birth: 24 February 1996 (age 30)
- Place of birth: Abasolo, Guanajuato, México
- Height: 1.79 m (5 ft 10 1/2 in)
- Position: Centre back

Youth career
- 2011–2017: Morelia

Senior career*
Years	Team	Apps	(Gls)
2017–2019	Morelia	28	(0)
2020–2021	→ Correcaminos (loan)	23	(1)
- * Club domestic league appearances and goals as of 19:19, 4 June 2020 (UTC)

Jorge Alfredo Valadéz Callente (Note: In this Spanish name, the first or paternal surname is Valadéz and the second or maternal family name is Callente.) (born 24 February 1996) is a Mexican footballer who last played as a defender for Correcaminos UAT.

== Career ==
=== Youth ===
Valadez joined Morelia's youth academy in 2011. He continued through Monarcas Youth Academy successfully going through the U-15, U-17 and U-20. Until Zárate finally reached the first team, Roberto Herenández being the coach promoting him to first team.

=== Morelia ===
Valadez made his Liga MX debut on 29 September 2017 in a 3–0 win against Club Tijuana.
