= Atarjea =

Mexican city and municipality

Coordinates: 21°16′04″N 99°43′06″W

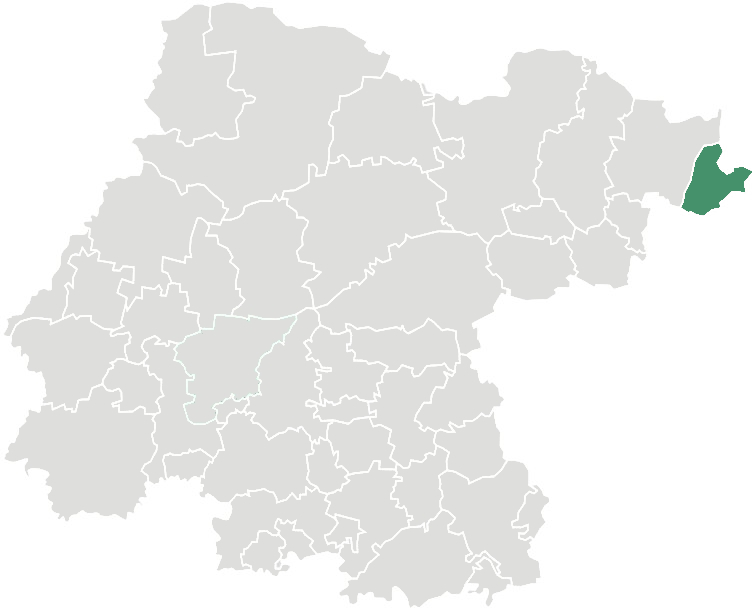
The location of Atarjea in the state of Guanajuato

Atarjea is a Mexican city and municipality located in the easternmost region of the state of Guanajuato, within the Sierra Gorda range. The municipality has an area of 318 square kilometres (1.04% of the surface of the state) and is bordered to the north by the state of San Luis Potosí, to the east and south by the state of Querétaro, and to the west by Xichú. The municipality had a population of 5,198 according to the 2005 census.

The name of the municipality is of Otomí origin and means "Where they go to drink water."

The municipal president of Atarjea and its many smaller outlying communities is Guadalupe Flores Loyola.

Localities in Atarjea

Locality	Population	Latitude	Longitude
El Carricillo	589	21°18'56" N	99°50'00" W
Atarjea	380	21°16'04" N	99°43'06" W
Aldama	348	21°10'41" N	99°50'06" W
Álamos	289	21°13'56" N	99°48'08" W
Mangas Cuatas	258	21°15'31" N	99°45'46" W
La Tapona	255	21°11'04" N	99°52'20" W
