= Tequila Corralejo =

Mexican brand of tequilla

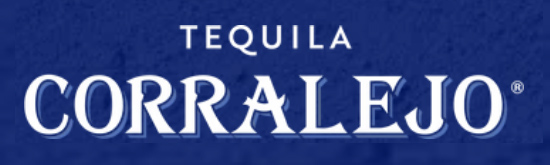

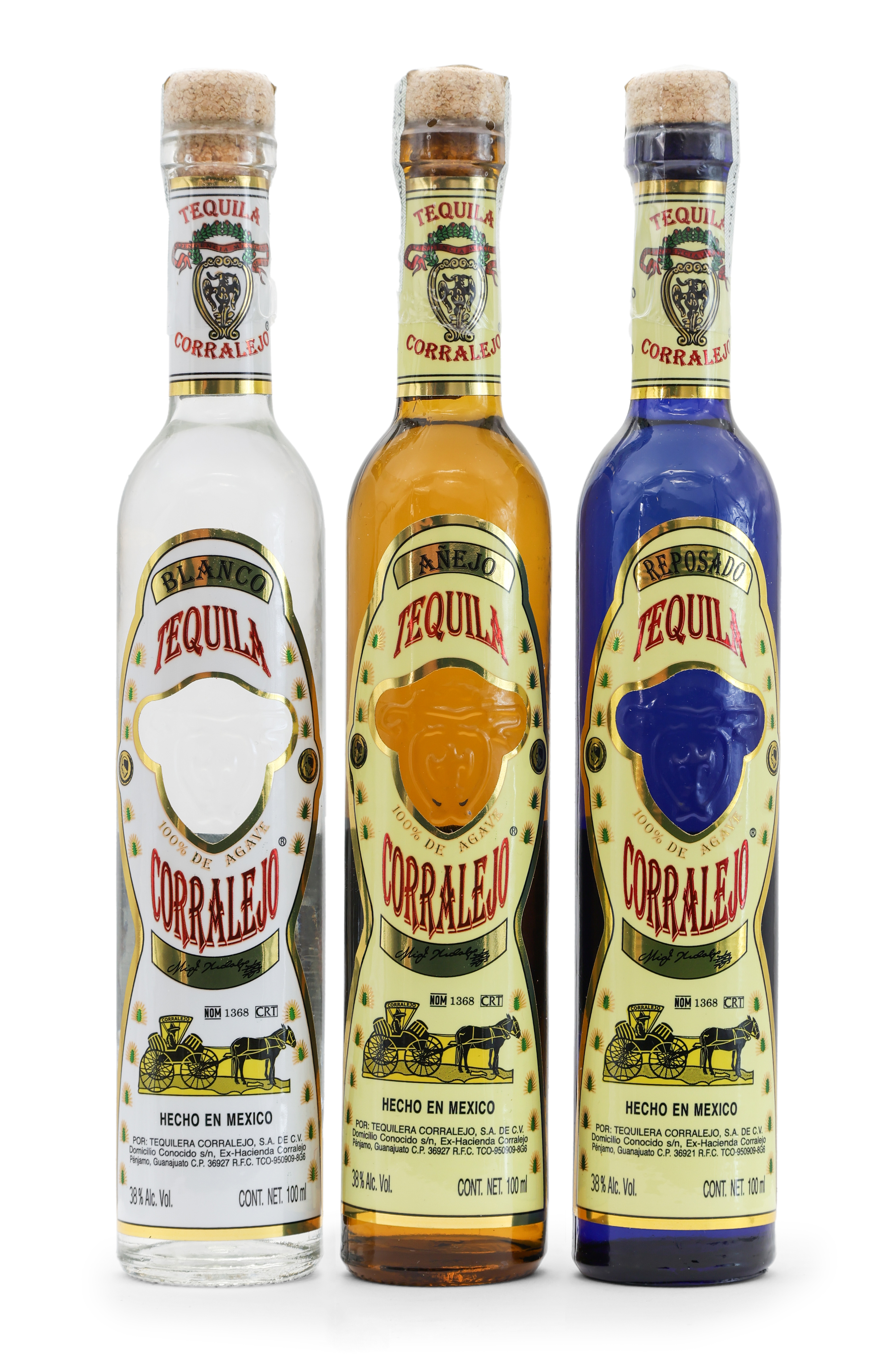
- Samplers of Tequila Corralejo: Blanco, Añejo, and Reposado
- Type: Alcoholic beverage
- Manufacturer: Tequilera Corralejo
- Introduced: 1996; 30 years ago
- Alcohol by volume: 38%
- Style: Tequila
- Website: corralejotequila.com

Tequila Corralejo (Spanish pronunciation: [teˈkila koraˈlexo]) is a brand of tequila distilled in Pénjamo, Guanajuato, Mexico. Established in 1996, it is located in the historic Hacienda de Corralejo, where it also offers guided tours and hosts social events. The majority of its production is shipped internationally, with 70 percent of sales reported in the United States in 2019.

Tequila Corralejo produces tequila in the "Blanco" (White), "Reposado" (Rested), "Añejo" (Aged), and "Extra Añejo" (Extra Aged) varieties. Each is sold in a distinctly colored bottle produced by the company itself. The company also produces a tequila cream as well as other alcohols.

== History ==
Tequila Corralejo is distilled in Pénjamo, Guanajuato, Mexico. It is produced at the former Hacienda de Corralejo, the birthplace of Mexican independence leader Miguel Hidalgo y Costilla, who later became known as the Father of Mexico. The hacienda had first begun distillery activities in the 1770s, with commercial distribution following in 1775.

The Hacienda de Corralejo was acquired by Leonardo Rodríguez Moreno in 1996. At the time, it was dilapidated, and thus Rodríguez began extensive renovations. The distillery was inaugurated by Vicente Fox, then the governor of Guanajuato; after Fox was elected President of Mexico in 2000, Tequila Corralejo shipped a cask to Mexico City for complimentary distribution to passers-by.

In 2003, Tequila Corralejo opened a new distillery. It was granted recognition by the government of Mexico in 2004, becoming the first tequila produced outside of Jalisco. It has remained one of the few tequilas distilled in Guanajuato, with other examples including one produced by Procesadora de Agave Penjamo. Seven areas in the state have a denomination of origin for agave cultivation and tequila production, though most production remains concentrated in Jalisco.

Tequila Corralejo produced 720,000 litres (160,000 imp gal; 190,000 US gal) of tequila per year and employed almost a hundred people by 2004. It had begun exporting its products internationally, with markets including the United States, Japan, and Spain. By 2010, Tequila Corralejo had developed a reputation in international markets as an alternative to major name brands, and was producing 32,000 litres (7,000 imp gal; 8,500 US gal) per day.

In 2018, Tequila Corralejo ranked twelfth in tequila sales in the United States, reporting sales of $8.1 million and an annual growth of 22.5%. It reported sales in seventy countries, which had expanded to a hundred by 2024. The majority of its products are sold internationally; in 2019, 70 percent of production was exported to the United States while only 15 percent was sold in Mexico. In 2021, El Sol de México identified Tequila Corralejo as the most prominent tequila producer in Guanajuato.

The hacienda and distillery are open to the public. In 2003, it was surrounded by agave, and included a restaurant and souvenir shop. In 2013, it had a museum covering the history of alcohol production, including the first Tequila Corralejo bottle as well as examples of local beers.

== Products ==
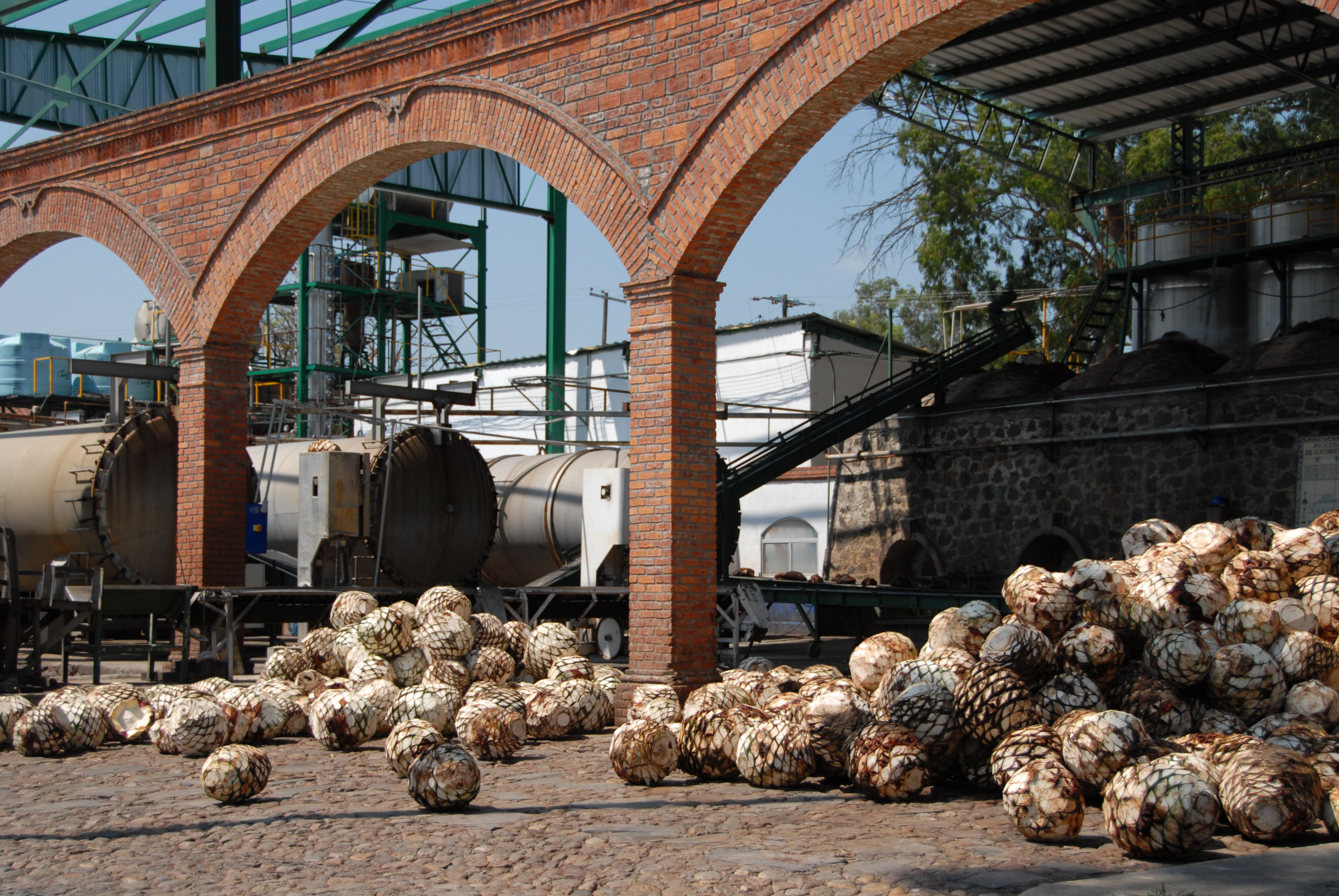
Distillery activities at the Hacienda de Corralejo.

Tequila Corralejo is made from blue agave, which is cooked in stone clay ovens over the course of 27 hours before being allowed to rest; autoclaves may also be used, with the juices from agave cooked using different methods later mixed. Twelve hours after cooking, the juice is extracted for fermentation. Distillation uses the Charentais method, with a mix of column stills and alembic copper pots. Bottles are manufactured by the company itself, using recycled glass. The Los Arango Tequila line is also produced using agave from the Hacienda de Corralejo. Writing for The Village Voice, Tara Finley described Tequila Corralejo as an approachable tequila with a "full-bodied and extremely satisfying" flavor.

As with other tequilas, Tequila Corralejo is available in different formats based on the time allowed for aging. "Blanco" (White) is sold after distilling, while "Reposado" (Rested), "Añejo" (Aged), and "Extra Añejo" (Extra Aged) are allowed to age. These expressions use different colored bottles, with the "Blanco" in clear bottles to allow easier observation, the "Reposado" in blue bottles, and the "Añejo" in red bottles. The brand has also produced limited edition runs, including an extra-aged tequila called Corralejo 1821. The company also produces a tequila cream, as well as its own rum, whiskey, and vodka, and sells chocolates, coffee, and goat cheese. The Reposado expression has been the brand's best seller.

== Works cited ==
- Martínez, Héctor (April 25, 2021). "Descubre el Circuito del Tequila con Sabor a Guanajuato" [Discover the Tequila Circuit in Guanajuato]. El Sol de México (in Spanish). Mexico City.
- Escalante, Jorge (June 6, 2004). "Un Tequila de Guanajuato" [A Tequila from Guanajuato]. Mural (in Spanish). Guadalajara – via ProQuest.
- Escalante, Jorge (July 18, 2009). "Quiere Guanajuato Mercado Tequilero" [Guanajuato Needs a Tequila Market]. Mural (in Spanish). Guadalajara. p. 8 – via ProQuest.
- Escalante, Jorge (January 14, 2013). "Impulsan Vía Tequilera" [Promoting the Tequila Route]. Mural (in Spanish). Guadalajara. p. 10 – via ProQuest.
- Finley, Tara (July 15, 2021). "Bottles, Cans, and Cocktails: Our Favorites for National Tequila Day". The Village Voice. Greenwich Village.
- "Global Market Review of Tequila – Forecasts to 2016". Just Drinks. London. April 2012 – via ProQuest.
- Hansen, Barbara (October 26, 2003). "Destination Mexico: Guanajuato's Deep Roots of Revolution". Los Angeles Times. Los Angeles. p. L8 – via ProQuest.
- Nabor, Andrea (October 6, 2019). "Pénjamo, La Tierra del Tequila en Guanajuato" [Pénjamo, Land of Tequila in Guanajuato]. El Universal (in Spanish). Archived from the original on April 4, 2026.
- "New Products". Beverage Industry. Vol. 111, no. 6. June 2020. pp. 16–17 – via ProQuest.
- Ortega, Patricia (July 26, 2024). "Tequila Corralejo: Pasión y Tradición de Pénjamo en Cada Botella" [Tequila Corralejo: The Passion and Tradition of Pénjamo in Every Bottle]. El Economista (in Spanish). Mexico City.
- Popp, Jamie (September 17, 2018). "Tequila Corralejo Seeks Global Expansion". Beverage Industry. Vol. 109, no. 9. Archived from the original on April 4, 2026.
