= Huanímaro =

Coordinates: 20°22′3″N 101°29′49″W

Huanímaro is a Mexican city (and municipality) located in the Southwest region of the state of Guanajuato. The municipality has an area of 130.57 square kilometres (0.43% of the surface of the state) and is bordered to the north and west by Abasolo, to the south by the state of Michoacán, and to the east by Valle de Santiago. The municipality had a population of 19,693 inhabitants according to the 2005 census.

The name of the municipality is of Purépecha Cuaimaro origin and means "Place of barter" or "Place where the maize toasts."

The municipal president of Huanímaro and its 28 outlying communities is José Francisco Chávez González

== Official website ==
- Huanímaro (in Spanish)
