= Purísima del Rincón =

Mexican municipality located in the state of Guanajuato

Coordinates: 21°02′N 101°52′W

- Municipality
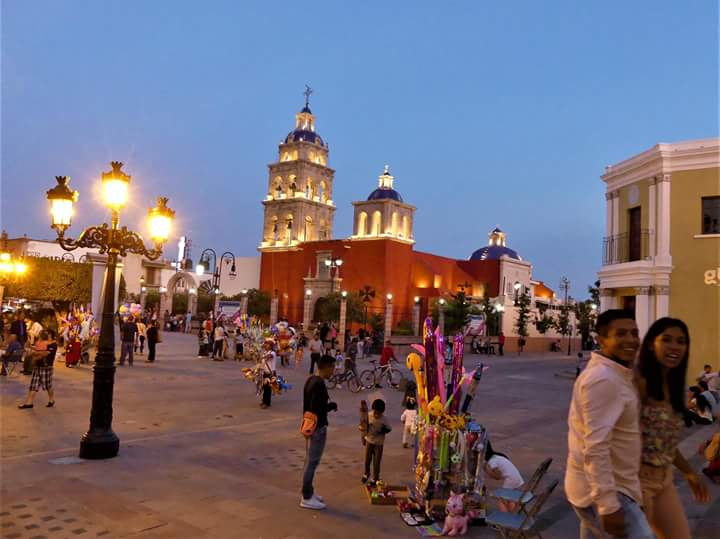
- Main plaza of Purísima del Rincón

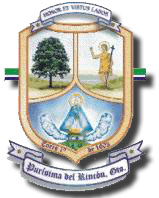
- Coat of arms

- Location in Guanajuato Purísima del Rincón (Mexico)
- Country: Mexico
- State: Guanajuato
- Demonym: (in Spanish)
- Time zone: UTC−6 (CST)

Purísima del Rincón is a Mexican municipality located in the state of Guanajuato, founded on January 1, 1603. Its municipal seat is the town of Purísima de Bustos.

The municipality has an area of 288.44 square kilometres (0.95% of the surface of the state), and is bordered to the north and east by San Francisco del Rincón, to the south by Manuel Doblado, and to the west by the state of Jalisco. The municipality had 68,795 inhabitants according to the 2010 census.

Purísima del Rincón is named after the Immaculate Conception. In 1954, Purísima de Bustos was named after Hermenegildo Bustos, an artist born in the city.

The municipal president of Purísima del Rincón and its many smaller outlying communities is Tomás Torres Montañez.
