= Manuel Doblado, Guanajuato =

Municipality in Guanajuato, Mexico

Manuel Doblado
- City
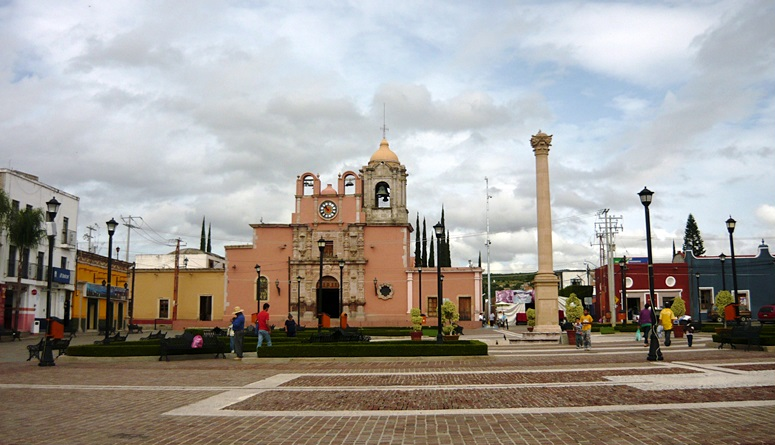

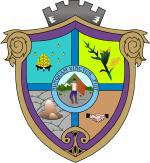
- Coat of arms

- Location in Mexico Manuel Doblado (Mexico)
- Coordinates: 20°43′49″N 101°57′12″W
- Country: Mexico
- State: Guanajuato
- Elevation (of seat): 1,900 m (6,200 ft)
- Time zone: UTC−06:00 (Central (US Central))
  - Summer (DST): UTC−05:00 (Central)

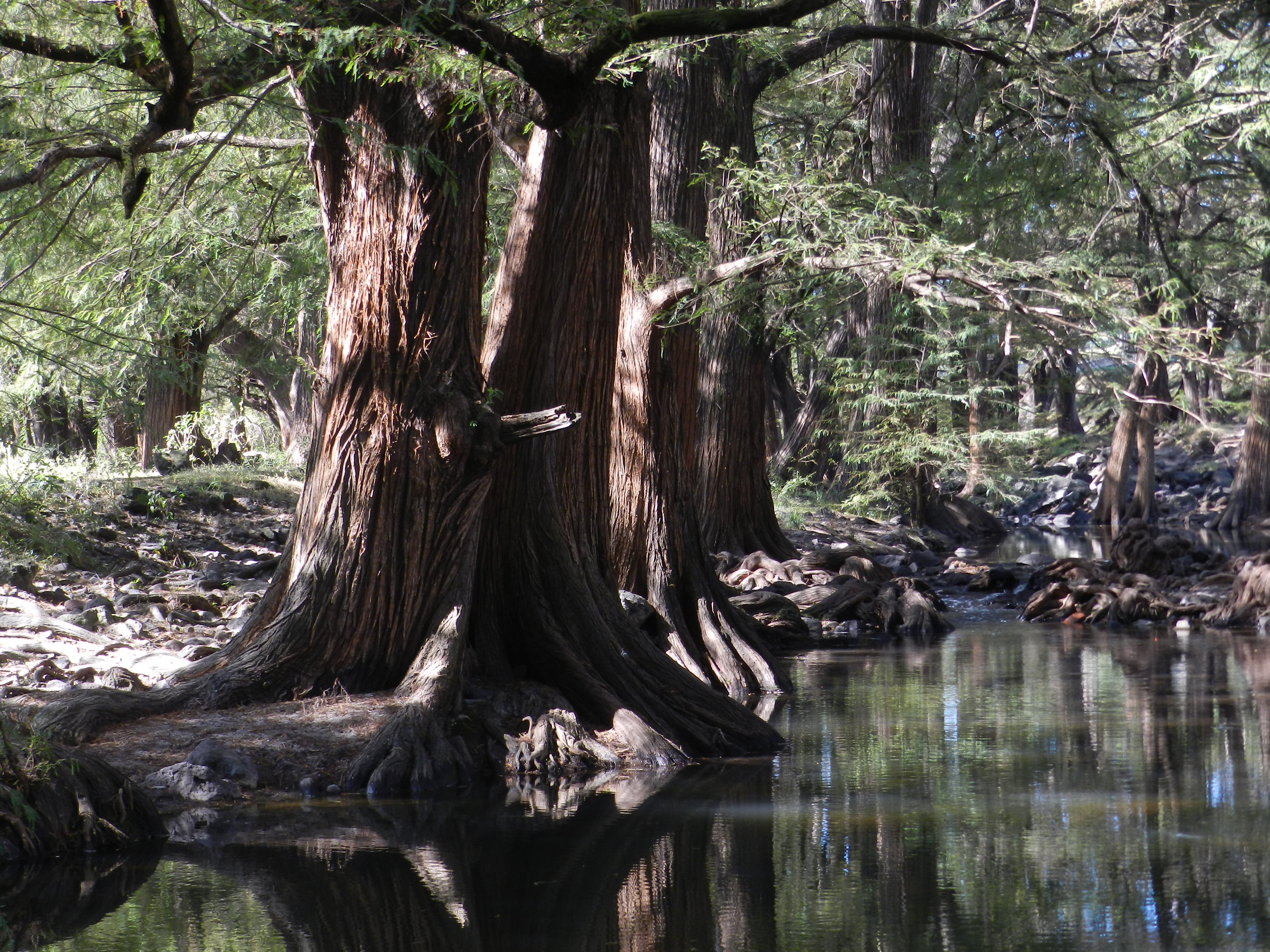

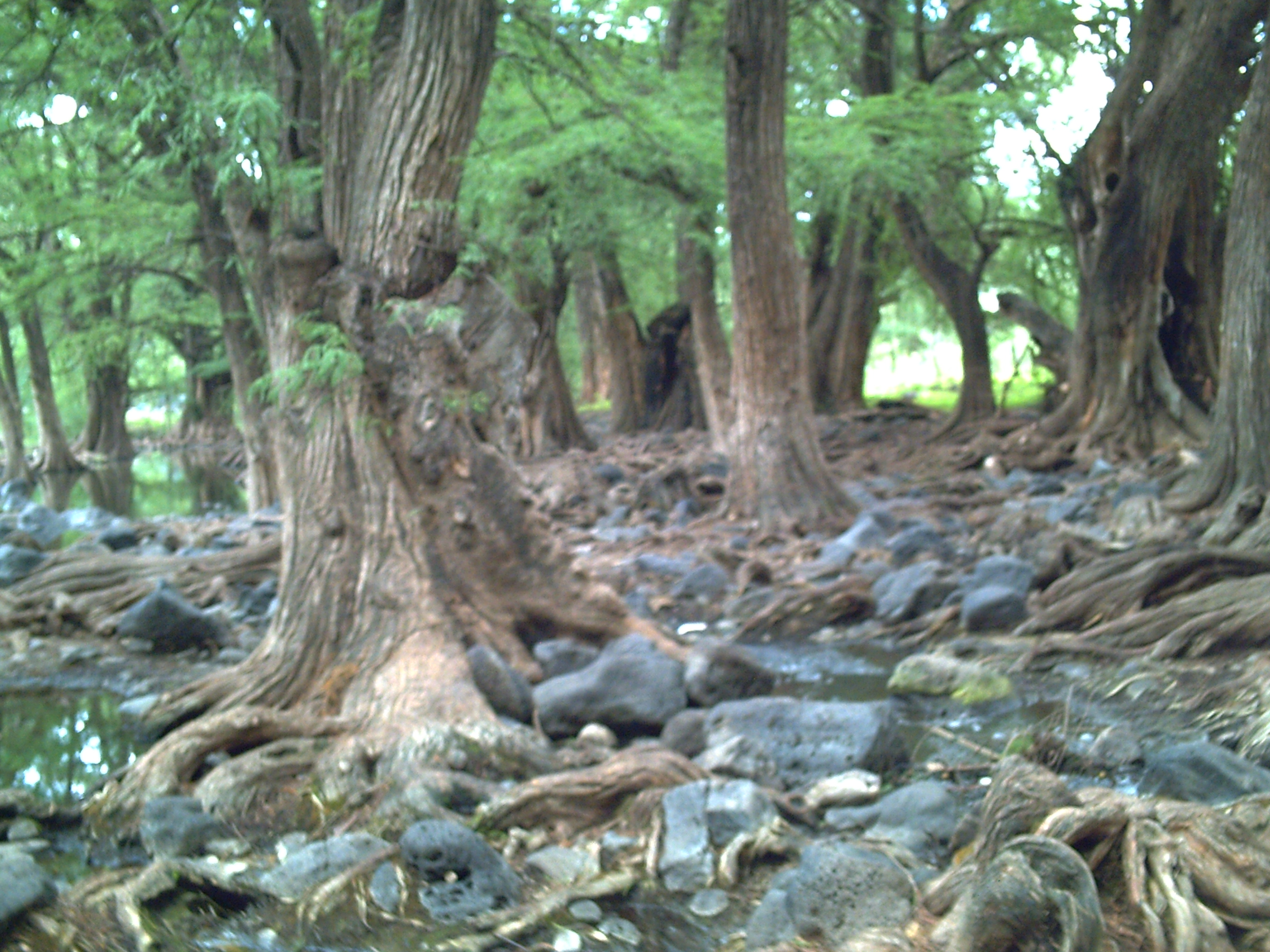

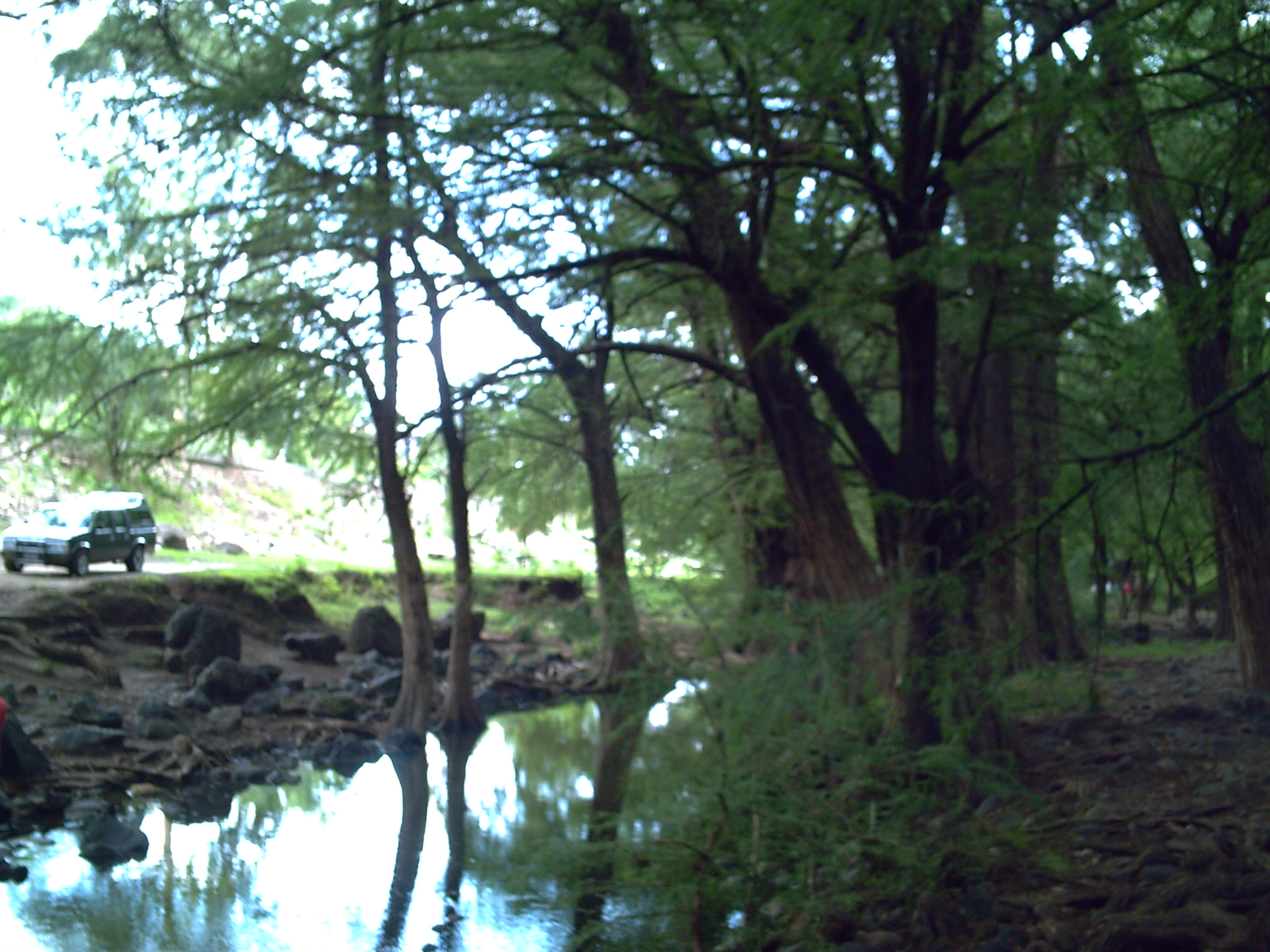

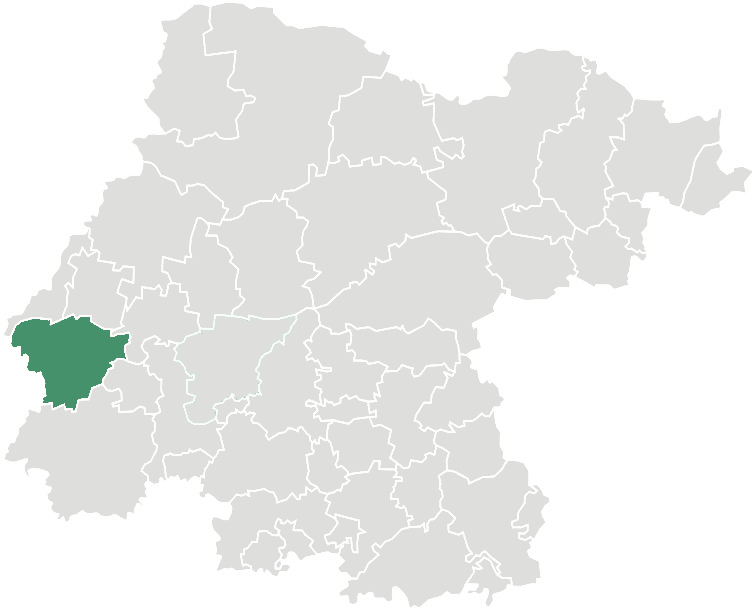

City Manuel Doblado is a Mexican municipality located in the State of Guanajuato, Mexico. Its municipal seat is the city of the same name. City Manuel Doblado has an area of 810.43 square kilometres (2.67% of the surface of the state) and is bordered to the north by Romita, Purísima del Rincón and San Francisco del Rincón, to the southeast by Cuerámaro, to the south by Pénjamo, and to the west by the state of Jalisco. The municipality had a population of 38,309 inhabitants according to the 2005 census.

The municipality has been known at various times as Tierra Blanca (1680), Piedra Gorda (from 1681 to 1693), San Pedro Piedra Gorda (from 1693 to 1899), and since 1899 as City Manuel Doblado, in honor of a distinguished lawyer born in the municipality.

== Government and politics ==
Chronology of the Municipal presidents
| First Name | Period of Government | Politic Party |
|---|---|---|
| José de Jesús Jaime Ríos | 1948 | |
| Felipe Flores | 1949 | |
| Efrén Hernández Pérez | 1950–1951 | |
| Felipe Flores | 1952–1954 | |
| Enrique Raya Padilla | 1955–1956 | |
| Juan Barajas Rodríguez | 1958–1960 | |
| Félix Valdés Becerra | 1960–1963 | |
| Tadeo Martínez Navarro | 1964–1965 | |
| José Torres Vargas | 1965–1966 | |
| Guadalupe Vargas | 1967–1968 | |
| Crescencio López Bonilla | 1968–1969 | |
| Tadeo Martínez Sáinz | 1970–1972 | |
| Arnulfo Rea Estrada | 1973 | |
| Jesús Maciel Ortiz | 1974–1976 | |
| María del Rosario López Carmona | 1979 | |
| Manuel Serna Arbieta | 1980–1982 | |
| Profra. Beatriz Pérez Arellano | 1983–1985 | |
| Lic. Rogelio Villanueva Fuentes | 1986–1988 | |
| Pascual Ramírez Córdoba | 1989–1991 | PRI |
| Filemón Ramírez Rodríguez | 1992–1994 | PRI |
| Jorge Pérez Cabrera | 1995–1997 | PRI |
| Pascual Ramírez Córdoba | 1998–2000 | PRI |
| Alicia Villanueva Paz | 2000–2003 | PRI |
| Ulises Magaña Hernández | 2003–2006 | PAN |
| Leopoldo Villanueva Chávez | 2006–2009 | PRI |
| Rodolfo Madrigal Ramirez | 2009–2012 | PAN |
| Manuel Pedroza Ramírez | 2012–2015 | COAL, PRI– PVEM |
| Juan Artemio León Zárate | 2015–2018 | PAN |
| Gustavo Adolfo Alfaro Reyes | 2018-2021 | PRI |
| Blanca Haydeé Preciado Pérez | 2021–2024 | PAN |
| Gustavo Adolfo Alfaro Reyes | 2024-2027 | PRI |
