= Cuerámaro =

Coordinates: 20°37′33″N 101°40′26″W

Cuerámaro is a Mexican city (and municipality) located in Southwest region of the state of Guanajuato. The municipality has an area of 254.85 square kilometres (0.83% of the surface of the state) and is bordered to the north by Romita, to the east by Abasolo, to the south by Pénjamo, and to the west by Manuel Doblado. The municipality had a population of 25,610 inhabitants according to the 2005 census.

In pre-Columbian times, the area was inhabited by Guachichil people and eventually dominated by Purépecha, who gave the municipality its current name of Cuerámaro or "Coat of the Swamps."

The municipal president of Cuerámaro and its many smaller outlying communities is Ana Bueno.
