= Pénjamo =

City in Guanajuato, Mexico

Pénjamo, Guanajuato
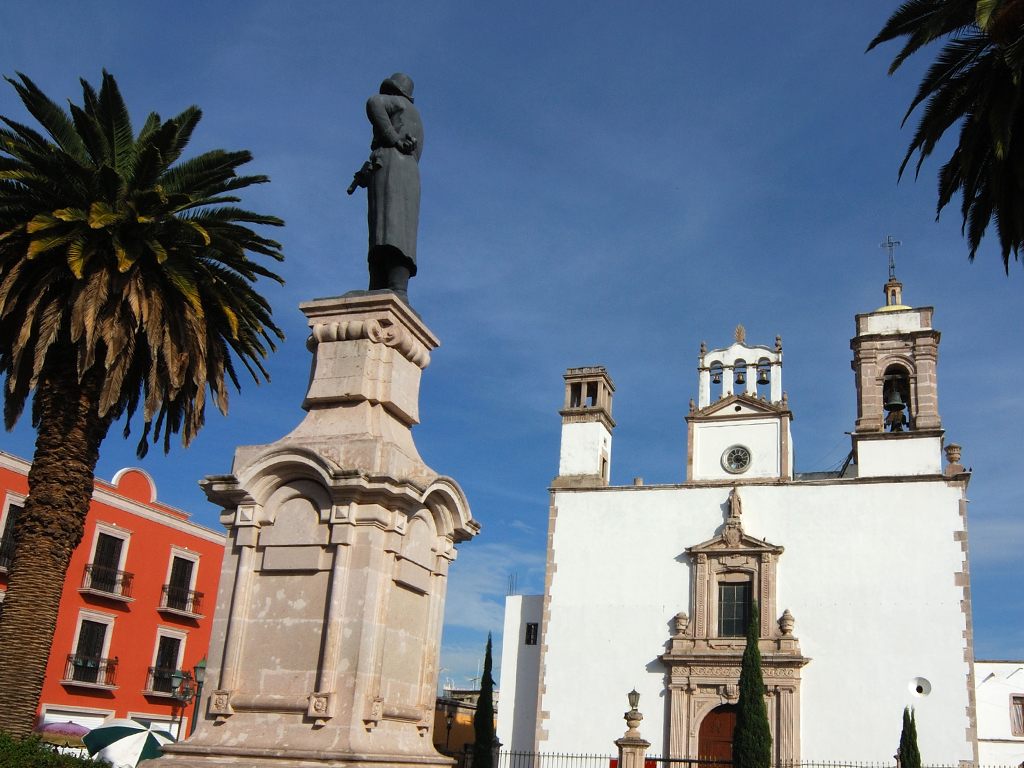
- Monument to Hidalgo and San Francisco temple in the main square of Pénjamo

- Coat of arms
- Nickname: Cuna de Hidalgo
- Location within Guanajuato Location within Mexico
- Coordinates: 20°25′52″N 101°43′20″W
- Country: Mexico
- Federal entity: Guanajuato
- Founded: 12 November 1542

Government
  - Mayor: Yozajamby Molina (MORENA)
- Elevation: 1,770 m (5,810 ft)

Population (2000)
  - Total: 40,076
- Time zone: UTC-6 (Central Standard Time)
- Postal code: 36900
- Website: www.penjamo.gob.mx

Pénjamo (Purepecha: Penlamu, "place of ahuehuetes") is a city in Guanajuato, Mexico. It is the seat of Pénjamo municipality. It was cofounded in 1549 by Guamares, Purépechas, and Otomis prior to the outbreak of the Chichimeca war.

The city is located in the southwest of Guanajuato, and accounts for a total of 164,261.27 hectares of land, or 5.20% of the total land in the state. It borders the municipalities of Abasolo, Cuerámaro, and Manuel Doblado and the states of Jalisco and Michoacán. According to the 2000 census, the total population of the municipality was 144,426; however, in the last census, conducted in 2010, the total population of the city was near 41,000, the majority of which devotes themselves to the services, trade, tourist services. The motto of the city is "Cradle of Hidalgo" ("Cuna de Hidalgo"), because in 1753, Miguel Hidalgo y Costilla, known as the Father of the Nation, was born in the Hacienda de Corralejo near the city.

The locality of Santa Ana Pacueco, which is part of Pénjamo, is linked to La Piedad in Michoacán by seven bridges over the Lerma River. Because of this, the two cities have common needs and problems. To address this, the Mexican Congress created the Pénjamo-La Piedad Metropolitan Area in 2010. The area had a population of 229,289 people according to the 2005 INEGI census. The locality of Santa Ana Pacueco is linked to La Piedad by seven bridges over the Lerma River.

== Geography ==
Pénjamo has an elevation in approximately 1,700 meters above sea level, but in some places, like Sierra de Pénjamo, it reaches an elevation of 2,400 meters above sea level.

The city is located near Mexican Federal Highway 90. It is approximately 40 minutes from the city of Irapuato and 130 kilometres (81 mi) from León.

A large part of the city lies on the slopes of Sierra de Pénjamo. The rest of the city is divided between hills and flat land. For this reason, some of Pénjamo's streets are very steep while others are straight.

== History ==
The territory that is now the municipality of Pénjamo was first settled by the Guachichil and Purépecha peoples. The archeological site Plazuelas is 11 kilometres (6.8 mi) from the city of Pénjamo.

The city and the municipality were founded on November 12, 1542 under the name of San Francisco de Penxamo by Diego Tomás de Jesuchihua, who was authorized by the Spanish king Carlos V. The Purépecha name for the city was Penlamu, meaning "place of ahuehuetes".

Miguel Hidalgo, recognized as the father of Mexico, was born in the former Hacienda de Corralejo, which was under Pénjamo's jurisdiction. Today the estate is used to distill Tequila Corralejo.

In 1811, during the Mexican War of Independence, the guerilla leader Albino García Ramos fought a battle against royalist forces in Pénjamo. In 1817, General Martín Francisco Javier Mina y Larrea was executed by Spanish soldiers in Sierra de Pénjamo.

Pénjamo was burned down completely in 1815, and rebuilding began in 1830. On May 22, 1857, Pénjamo was categorized as a town. It was recognized as a city in 1906 by decree of the governor Joaquín Obregón González.

During the Second World War, the city experienced blackouts to avoid bombardments.

== City seal ==

The seal of the city is a shield with an ahuehuete tree with its roots extending below the ground. Underneath the tree is written 1542, the year of the city's foundation. In the background is a drawing of Cerro Grande, one of the mountains in Sierra de Pénjamo against a blue sky with clouds and a five-pointed star. The year 1753 is written above the star, representing the year Miguel Hidalgo was born. At the top of the shield, above the image, are the words "Cuna de Hidalgo San Francisco de Penxamo". At the bottom of the shield are the latin words "Nobilis, Fidelis, Fortis" ("Noble, Faithful, Strong").

== Tourist attractions ==
Pénjamo is a tourist center. The city is part of Route 2010, which links important geographic locations related to the Mexican War of Independence and Revolution.

The following tourist attractions exist in or near Pénjamo:

- Corralejo: The birthplace of Miguel Hidalgo. Celebrations are held at the estate during the first week of May, when Hidalgo's birth is celebrated.
- Plazuelas: An archeological site and museum that is open to the public. The site has a large, rectangular plaza and several pyramids, as well as a ball court. Dances and events are held in spring.
- Sierra de Pénjamo
- La Feria de Mayo or Fiestas de Mayo (May Festival): The fair occurs from the last days of April until the first third of May every year, in commemoration of Hidalgo's birthday. The fair includes art exhibitions, jaripeo events, and bullfighting.
- Festival Cultural de la Fundación (Founding Festival): The festival lasts from November 6 to 13 and celebrates the day the city was founded, November 12, 1542. The festival features art and photograph exhibitions, live music and theatrical shows, a parade and fireworks, motocross racing, and jaripeo events.

== Notable people ==
- Don Miguel Hidalgo y Costilla - leader of the Mexican War of Independence (1753-1811)
- Joaquín Pardavé - cinematographic and theatrical director, composer and actor (1900-1955)
- Luis Navarro Origel - prominent cristero during the Cristero War (1897-1928)
- Ignacio Vázquez Torres - Mexican congressman (1939-2023)
