= Xichú =

Coordinates: 21°17′59″N 100°03′19″W

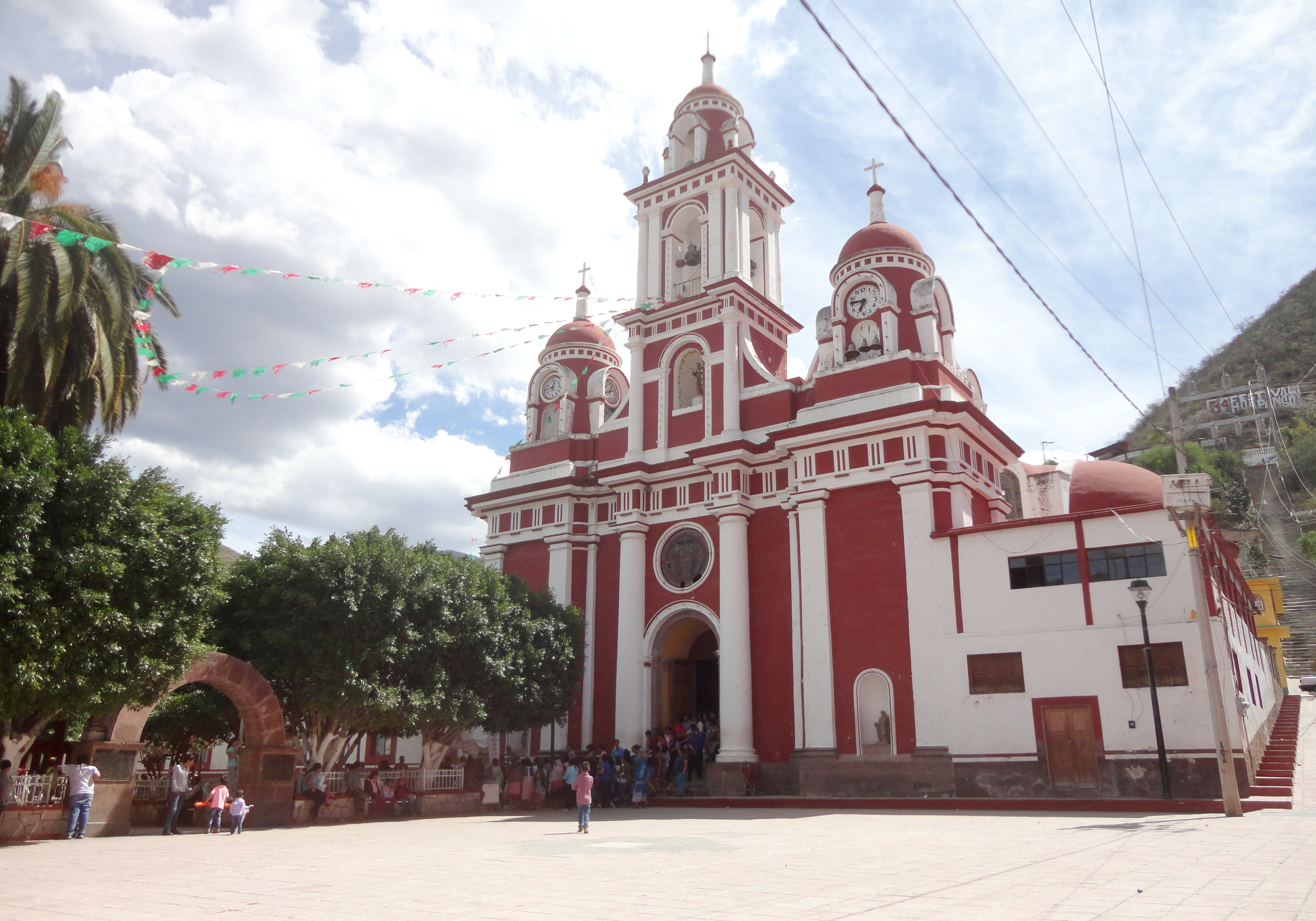
San Francisco de Asís Parish

Xichú is a Mexican city (and municipality) located in the Northeast region of the state of Guanajuato. The municipality is entirely within the Sierra Gorda range and has an area of 912.20 square kilometres (3.0% of the surface of the state). It is bordered to the north by the state of San Luis Potosí, to the east by Atarjea, to the south by the state of Querétaro and Santa Catarina and to the west by Victoria. The municipality had a population of 11,323 inhabitants according to the 2005 census.

In pre-Hispanic times the area was known as Maxichú or "Sisterhood of my grandmother" by the mostly Chichimeca inhabitants.

The municipal president of Xichú and its many smaller outlying communities, which include San Miguel de las Casitas, El Aguacate, El Guamúchil, El Milagro, Las Palomas, and Mesón de Santa Rosa.
