= Silao =

Silao de la Victoria
- City
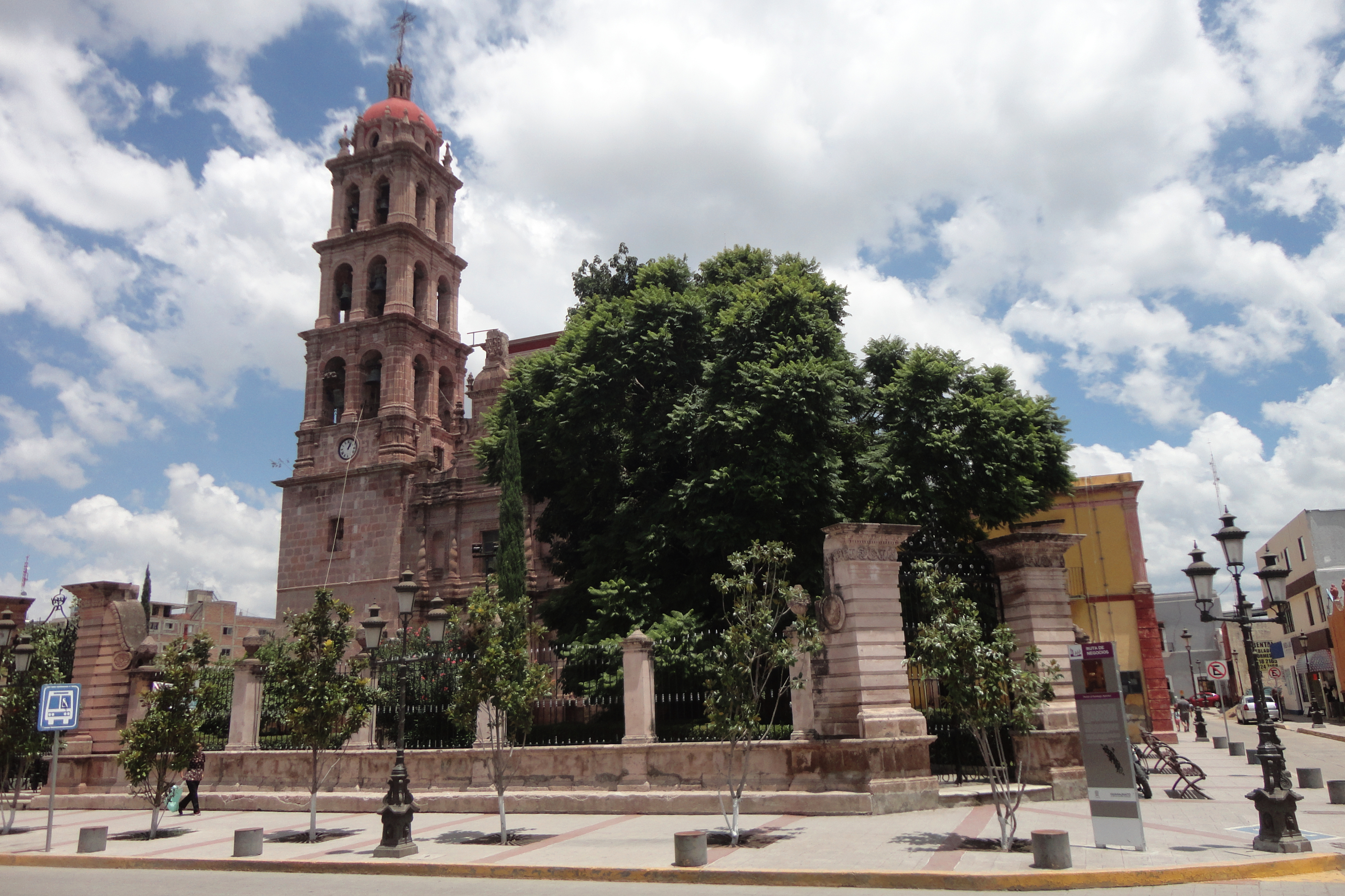

- Coat of arms
- Nickname: Silao
- Location within Guanajuato Location within Mexico
- Coordinates: 20°56′52″N 101°25′41″W
- Country: Mexico
- State: Guanajuato
- Municipality: Silao
- Founded: July 25th, 1537

Government
  - Mayor: Melanie Murillo Chávez

Area
  - City: 12.1 km^{2} (4.7 sq mi)
  - Municipality: 538.5 km^{2} (207.9 sq mi)
- Elevation: 1,780 m (5,840 ft)

Population (2020 census)
  - City: 83,352
  - Density: 6,890/km^{2} (17,800/sq mi)
  - Municipality: 203,556
  - Municipality density: 378.0/km^{2} (979.0/sq mi)
- Demonym: silaoense
- Time zone: UTC-6 (CST)
- Mexican Postal Code: 36100
- Area code: 472
- Website: http://www.silao.gob.mx

Silao (Spanish pronunciation: [siˈla.o]), officially Silao de la Victoria, is a city in the west-central part of the state of Guanajuato in Mexico. It is the seat of the municipality with the same name. As of the 2005 census, the city had a population of 66,485, making it the seventh-largest city in the state. Silao is a center of agricultural and industrial activity.

== Airport ==
This city is served by the Del Bajío International Airport. It functions as the central airport for the cities of Irapuato, Guanajuato, León, Salamanca and San Miguel de Allende.

== Toponymy ==
In its original Otomi language, the area was called Tsinäkua by both the Otomi and Purépecha natives. In the Otomi language its name Tsinäkua means 'place of dense fog,' as a result of the columns of water vapor rising from thermal springs in the area of Comanjilla. The name evolved to 'Sinaua', 'Silagua' and finally 'Silao' after the Spanish conquest of the region.

== History ==
In the place where Silao now sits, there was an Otomí settlement that was conquered by the Purépecha empire. The name of the area remained Tsinäkua under Purepecha rule. The name evolved to 'Sinaua', 'Silagua' and finally 'Silao' after the region was later conquered by Spain.

== Geography ==
Silao is located in the Mexican state of Guanajuato. It is situated 100° 25′ 59″ longitude west of the Greenwich meridian and 20° 56′ 24″ latitude north. Its altitude is 1,780 meters above sea level.

The municipality of Silao has an area of 538.5 km^{2}, equivalent to 1.76% of the total state area. The city of Guanajuato lies to the east and north of Silao; to the south lies Irapuato; to the west is Romita; to the northwest is León.

=== Geology ===
The territory of Silao is almost planar formed in by the Bajío, between its few important elevations, one can find the 'Cerro del Cubilete' whose altitude is 2,570 meters above sea level and is considered the geographic center of the country.

=== Hydrography ===
The Silao River, crosses the major part of the municipal territory. It is fed by the Magueyes, Pascuales, Hondo, and Tigre streams, as well as the Gigante River, which is its major tributary. Within the municipality are some streams of importance, like those of the Agua Zarca, San Francisco, El Paraíso, Pabileros, and Aguas Buenas.

=== Climate ===
The climate of the city is semi-arid in the majority of the territory, with rains in the summer and an average annual temperature of 28 °C. Temperatures can rise as high as 34 °C in the month of June, and a minimum of 0 °C has been reached in the months of December and January. However, in the northeastern zone the climate varies to semi-dry with a temperature predominantly in excess of 28 °C. Precipitation varies between 600 and 800 millimeters per year.

== Economy ==
Silao is a center of agricultural and industrial activity in the area, with a wide variety of farm crops, produce and dairy packing plants. A General Motors truck and SUV assembly plant which as of 2016 makes one third of Chevrolet and GMC Full-size Pickups. Volkswagen has an engine plant, and Pirelli makes tires.

== Population ==
According to the results presented by the second 'Conteo de Población y Vivienda' (census) of 2005, the municipality counts a total of 147,123 inhabitants.

=== Ethnic groups ===
The indigenous population of Silao is limited to 203 inhabitants that represent 0.15% of the total municipal population. The principal native languages are Mazahua and Nahuatl.

According to the second 'Conteo de Población y Vivienda' (Census) of 2005, there are a total of 187 persons who speak some indigenous language.

The municipality has a density of 250 persons per square kilometer and an average population increase of 1.6%.

=== Religion ===
95.8% of the population of Silao (as of 2000) are Roman Catholic. Approximately 1.8% are Protestants and Evangelicals, and 1.4% are other religions. The last 1% either stated they don't have a religion or it wasn't specified.

== Historic Monuments ==
- Parroquia de Santiago Apóstol, construction was started in the end of the 17th century and ended in the year 1728. Its style is neo-classical.
- Templo del Santuario, constructed at the end of the 17th century.
- Templo de la Casa de Ejercicios, built in 1834.
- Palacio Municipal, formerly functioned as city jail and headquarters.
- Mercado González Ortega, main market in Silao.
- Monument to Cristo Rey (Christ the King), started construction on December 10, 1945, and completed on August 17, 1949. The monument itself stands 20 meters from foot to head and is in the 'cerro del Cubilete', which is considered the geographic center of the country of Mexico.
- Casa de Mauricio Ruiz, historic house, home of the Mexican artist Mauricio Ruiz Chávez

== Tourist attractions ==
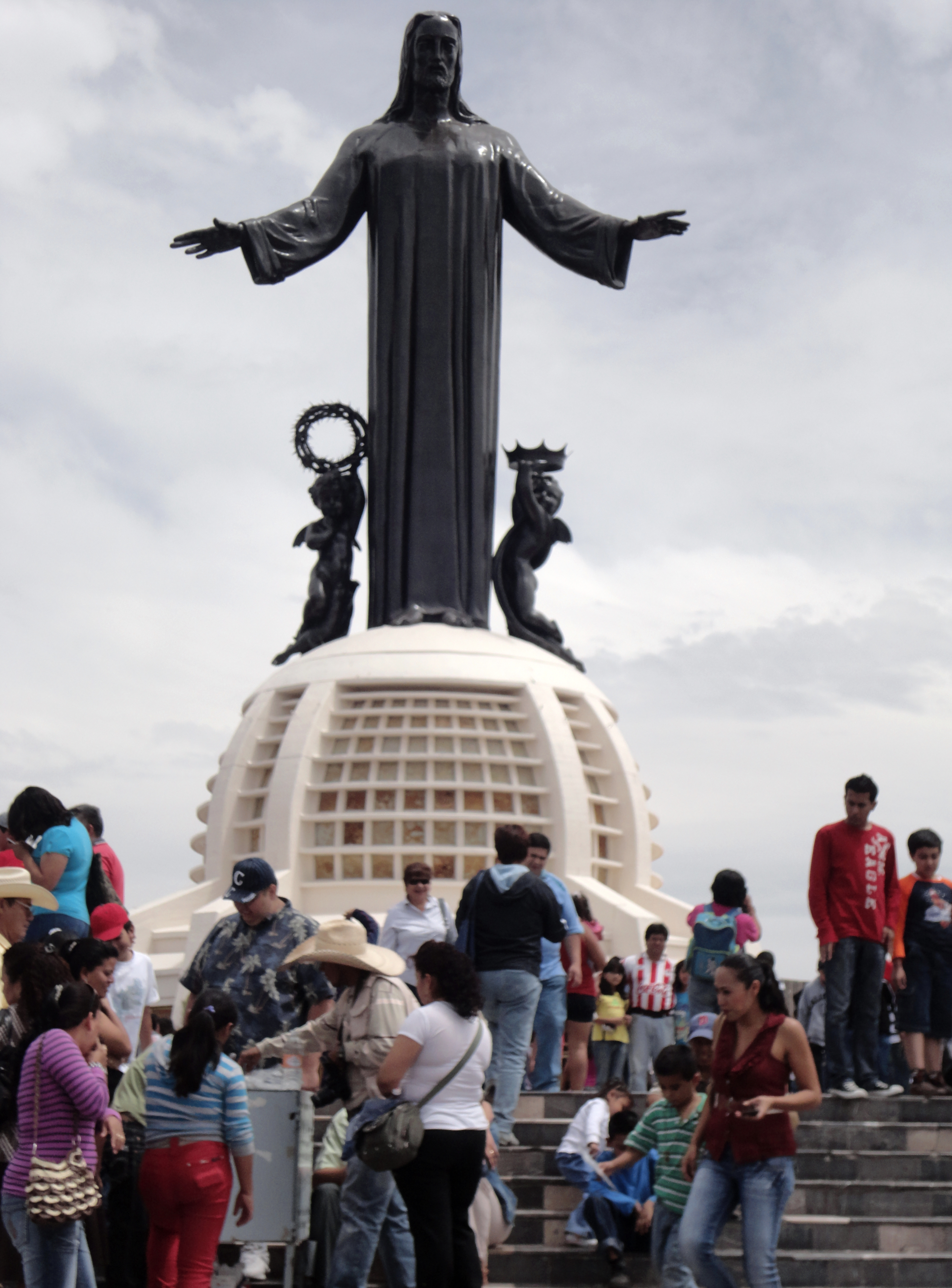
Cristo Rey

Some of the attractions in Silao are:

- Here one can find the Cerro del Cubilete, considered by some to be the geographic center of the country. In the highest part of the mountain (at 2,500 meters) stands a monument to Cristo Rey or Christ the King. It represents the unity of the people of Mexico in the Catholic faith. The Bajio region was the center of the Catholic insurgency in the Cristero War, whose battle cry was "¡Viva Cristo el Rey!". Construction started on December 10, 1945, and was completed on August 17, 1949. The monument itself measures 20 meters from its feet to its head. Its location dominates the scenery of the 'Bajío' region surrounding Silao.
- Museum of the Chávez Morado Brothers (muralists and sculptors).
- Silao has 27 parochial churches and innumerable buildings rich in architecture and history.
- Building of the 'Casa de la Cultura' (House of Culture), previously the military quarters of Silao.

Silao is also central to other cities and towns of interest to tourists. The cities of Guanajuato and Romita are approximately 25 minutes by highway. León and Irapuato are about 35 minutes by highway.

== Business district ==
This municipality contains the Puerto Interior business district. This District is designed to lodge: hotels, financial and commercial buildings.
