= Pueblo Nuevo, Guanajuato =

Coordinates: 20°31′37″N 101°22′24″W

Pueblo Nuevo
- Municipality
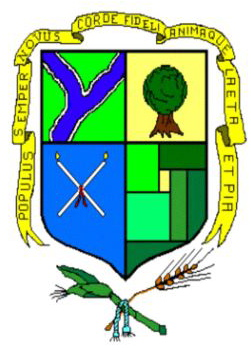
- Coat of arms

- Location in Guanajuato Pueblo Nuevo (Mexico)
- Country: Mexico
- State: Guanajuato
- Demonym: (in Spanish)
- Time zone: UTC−6 (CST)

Pueblo Nuevo is a municipality in the Mexican state of Guanajuato. Its borders are Salamanca, Irapuato, Valle de Santiago, Abasolo.

Former mayor José Durán González, 67, was ambushed and murdered on September 5, 2017.
