= Abasolo, Guanajuato =

Mexican city (and municipality)

Coordinates: 20.450°N 101.517°W

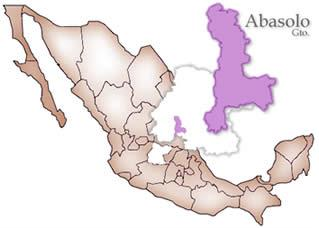
Location of Abasolo, Guanajuato in Mexico.

Abasolo is a Mexican city (and municipality) located in the Southwest region of the state of Guanajuato. The municipality has an area of 601.73 square kilometres (1.98% of the surface of the state), and is bordered to the north by Pueblo Nuevo and Valle de Santiago, to the south by the state of Michoacán and Huanímaro, and to the west by Pénjamo and Cuerámaro. The municipality had 79,093 inhabitants according to the 2005 census. The city was estimated to have 28,100 inhabitants in 2020.

In pre-Columbian times the area was known as Cuitzeo or "Place of skunks (Lugar de Zorrillos)", by the mostly Purépecha inhabitants.

Abasolo is named after José Mariano Abasolo, a Mexican patriot and leader of Mexico's war of independence against Spain.

The municipal president of Abasolo and its many smaller outlying communities is Job Eduardo Gallardo Santellano.

The archaeological site of Peralta is located near Abasolo, east of the town.

== Climate ==
Climate data for Abasolo
Month	Jan	Feb	Mar	Apr	May	Jun	Jul	Aug	Sep	Oct	Nov	Dec	Year
Mean daily maximum °C (°F)	25.1 (77.2)	27 (81)	29.9 (85.8)	32.3 (90.1)	33.2 (91.8)	31.5 (88.7)	29.1 (84.4)	29 (84)	28.4 (83.1)	28.1 (82.6)	27.3 (81.1)	25.5 (77.9)	29 (84)
Mean daily minimum °C (°F)	7.3 (45.1)	8.4 (47.1)	11.0 (51.8)	14 (57)	15.6 (60.1)	15.9 (60.6)	14.9 (58.8)	14.5 (58.1)	14.2 (57.6)	12.3 (54.1)	9.5 (49.1)	7.7 (45.9)	12.1 (53.8)
Average precipitation mm (inches)	13 (0.5)	5.1 (0.2)	5.1 (0.2)	7.6 (0.3)	33 (1.3)	120 (4.7)	180 (7)	150 (6.1)	110 (4.5)	41 (1.6)	7.6 (0.3)	7.6 (0.3)	690 (27.1)
Source: Weatherbase
