= Coat of arms of Guanajuato =

Coat of Arms of Guanajuato

The Shield of the State of Guanajuato, which originally belonged to the city of the same name, was created by King Carlos I of Spain. The composition of the Shield is as follows: It rests on a mantel depicting being of colored marble trimmed with gold. At the base there is a shell supported by two laurel branches that they are joined by a blue ribbon. The shell that links the shield symbolizes the stability of the home, widening its borders. The background with a field of gold means nobility, magnanimity and purity of feelings, and at the same time, the richness of metals precious that are in the entity. The auction is a symbol of greatness. The laurels are the symbol of victory and the acanthus of the Fidelity; in the center it bears the image of the Santa Fe de la Granada, which symbolizes the triumph of the Catholic monarchs over the Muslims.

== Historical coats ==
The symbol is used by all successive regimes in Guanajuato, in different forms.

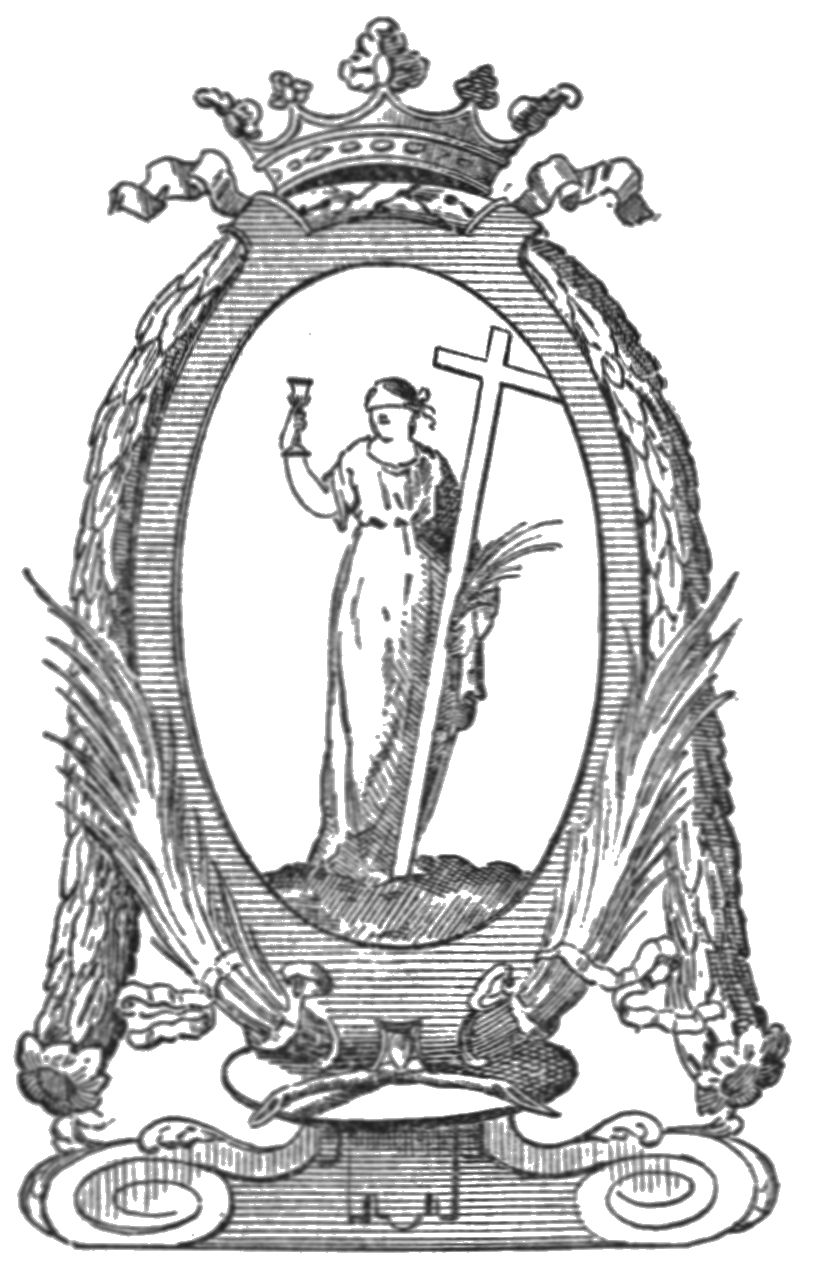
Coat of arms since 1793 to 1989.

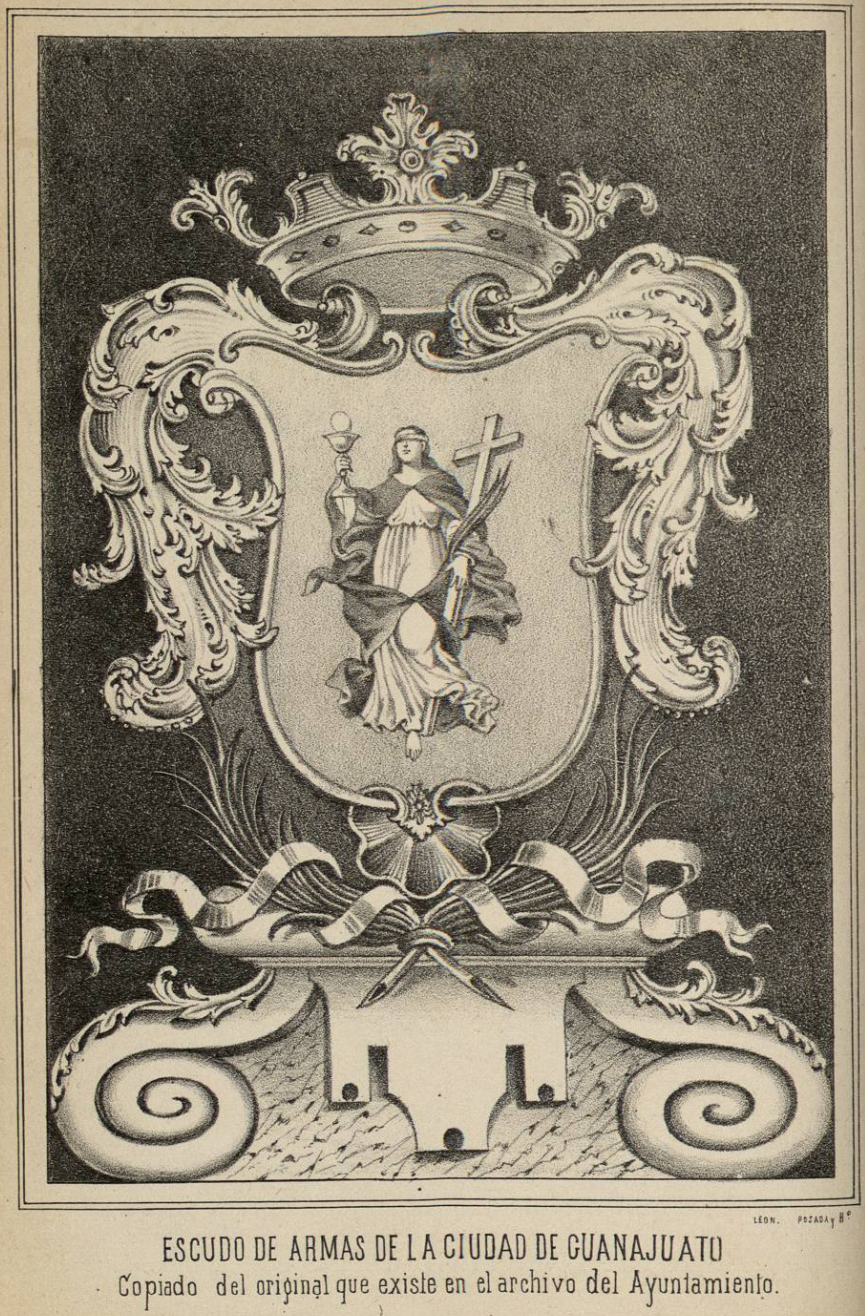
Coat of arms since 1989 to 2011.

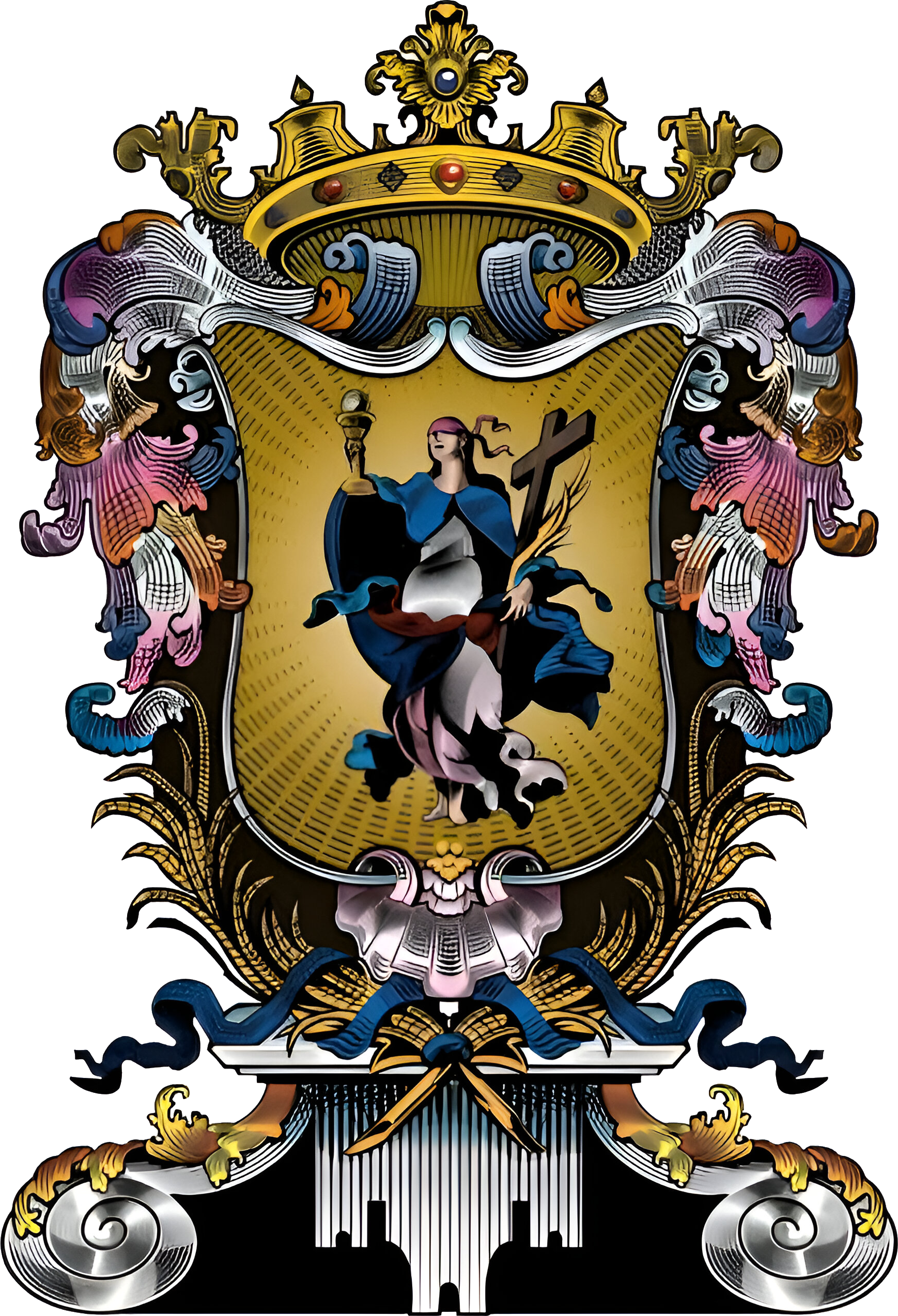
Coat of arms since 2023.

== See also ==
- Coat of arms of Mexico
- Flag of Guanajuato
