= Juan Zaragoza =

Juan Zaragoza may refer to:

- Juan Zaragoza (accountant) (born 1959), Puerto Rican accountant and Secretary of Treasury
- Juan Zaragoza (footballer) (born 1984), Mexican footballer
