= Symbols of Irapuato =

The symbols of city of Irapuato, Mexico, are the coat of arms or seal and the municipal flag.

== Coat of arms ==
Coat of Arms of Irapuato.

The municipality's coat of arms is divided into four fields, in the first there are four Spanish helmets and the episcopal shield of Don Vasco de Quiroga. In the second quadrant is a winged lion representing Saint Mark the Evangelist with a K and a V representing Charles V, the emperor, the third lower quadrant is a hill that presents the toponym of Irapuato and the fourth lower quadrant is two hands with a sickle and the other with a caduceus, At the top is a sun. At the bottom it has a motto Ad Augusta per Augusta.

== Flag ==
Irapuato
- Use: Civil and state flag
- Proportion: 4:7
- Adopted: 2010

The flag of Irapuato was adopted in 2010. It is colored green and gold and bears the city Emblem in the center. The emblem has a diameter of three-quarters the width of the stripes. The ratio of the flag is 4:7. Ribbons of the same colors may be placed at the foot of the finial.

== See also ==
- List of Mexican municipal flags
- Irapuato
- Flag of Guanajuato
