= Antonio Patlán =

Mexican footballer (born 1983)

Personal information
- Full name: José Antonio Patlán Valtierra
- Date of birth: January 12, 1983 (age 43)
- Place of birth: Irapuato, Guanajuato, Mexico
- Height: 5 ft 10 in (1.78 m)
- Positions: Centre back; defensive midfielder

Youth career
- 2004–2005: Chivas La Piedad
- 2005–2006: Chivas Coras
- 2006: Tapatío

Senior career*
Years	Team	Apps	(Gls)
2006–2011	Chivas de Guadalajara (loan)	20	(1)
2008–2009	→ Santos Laguna (loan)		
2009–2010	→ Club León (loan)	11	(0)
2010	→ Leones Negros (loan)	28	(2)
2010–2011	→ Indios (loan)	14	(0)
- * Club domestic league appearances and goals as of May 9, 2007

José Antonio Patlán Valtierra (born January 12, 1983) is a Mexican former footballer, who played as a centre back and as a defensive midfielder.

Patlán played his youth career in the Chivas de Guadalajara program, progressing through their Chivas La Piedad, Chivas Coras, and Tapatío youth squads.

Patlán made his professional debut with Chivas in a match against Club Toluca on 29 April 2006. He played through the Clausura 2006 season, as Chivas was short six of their starting players, who were in training with the Mexico national team (Oswaldo Sanchez, Gonzalo Pineda, Ramon Morales, Omar Bravo, Francisco Javier Rodriguez and Carlos Salcido) for the 2006 FIFA World Cup. Chivas had already qualified for the Clausura 2006 playoffs and for the Copa Libertadores, so the team started with Patlán (and other young players) for the playoffs, while the senior players returned in time for the Copa Libertadores.

Patlán, with Chivas, won the top level Liga MX championship of Apertura 2006, earning a spot as a consistent back-up defender for the Rojiblancos. The team also sent him, on loan, to four other teams over the 2008 to 2011 seasons, the longest of which was a 28-game stint with neighboring Guadalajara club Leones Negros UdeG in 2010.

== Championships ==
(Mexico)

Chivas de Guadalajara

- Mexican Championship - Apertura 2006
