= Instituto Tecnológico Superior de Irapuato =

Mexican university

Coordinates: 20°45′12″N 101°19′59″W

Higher Technological Institute of Irapuato
- Instituto Tecnológico Superior de Irapuato
- Motto: Sabiduría tecnológica, pasión de nuestro espíritu "Technological wisdom, our spirit's passion"
- Type: Public
- Established: 1996
- President: M. en F. José Ricardo Narváez Ramírez
- Students: 1.868 (2004)
- Location: Irapuato, Guanajuato, Mexico
- Campus: Suburban
- Website: www.itesi.edu.mx

The Higher Technological Institute of Irapuato (In Spanish: Instituto Tecnológico Superior de Irapuato), popularly known as ITESI, is a public, coeducational university located in the city of Irapuato, Guanajuato, Mexico.

The ITESI offers 17 bachelor's degrees and 4 masters programs in the areas of management and social sciences and engineering. By October 20, 1995, the state government of Guanajuato decreed the creation of ITESI; and the latter began its academic activities on August 18, 1996.
