= Irapuato =

- City and municipality
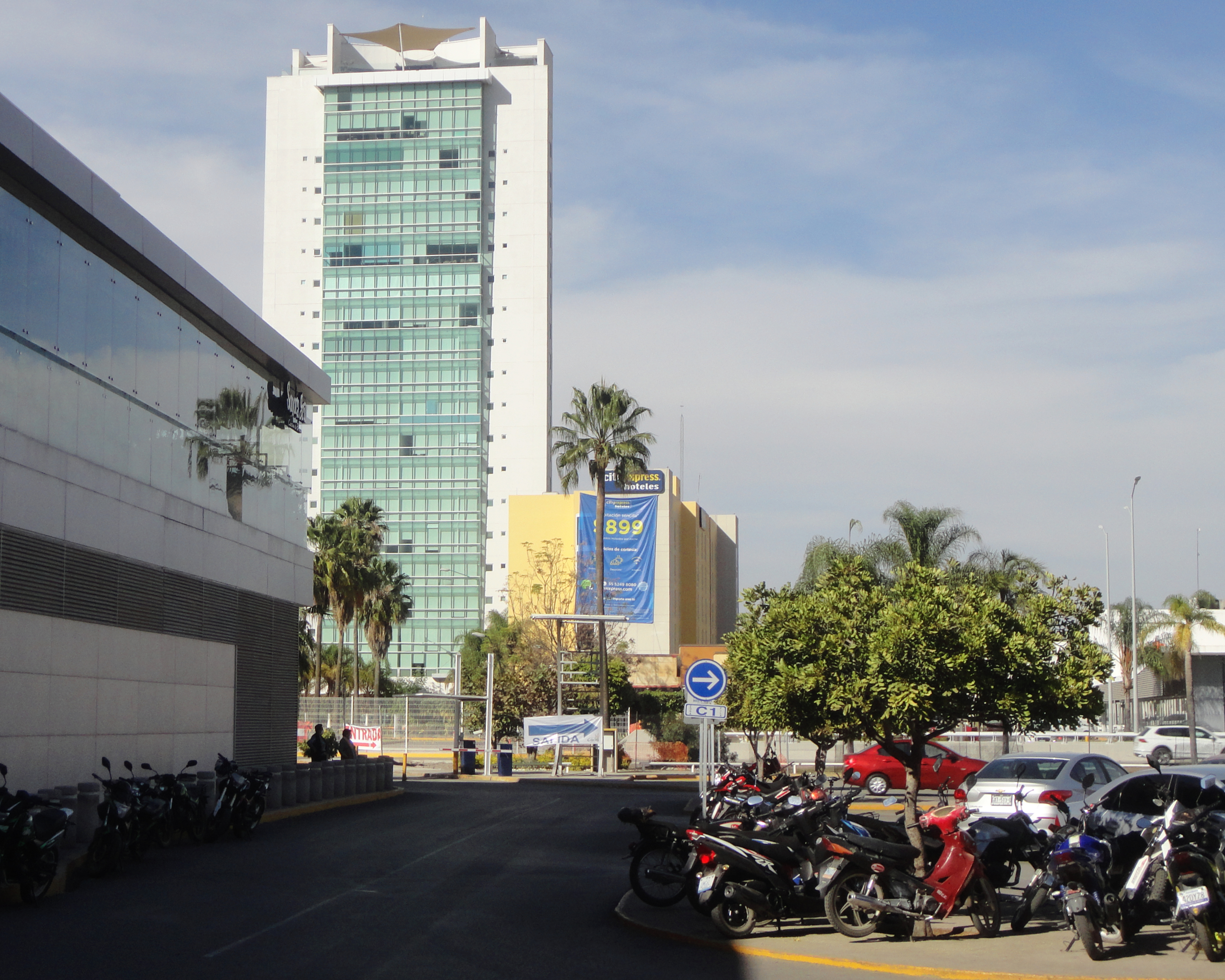
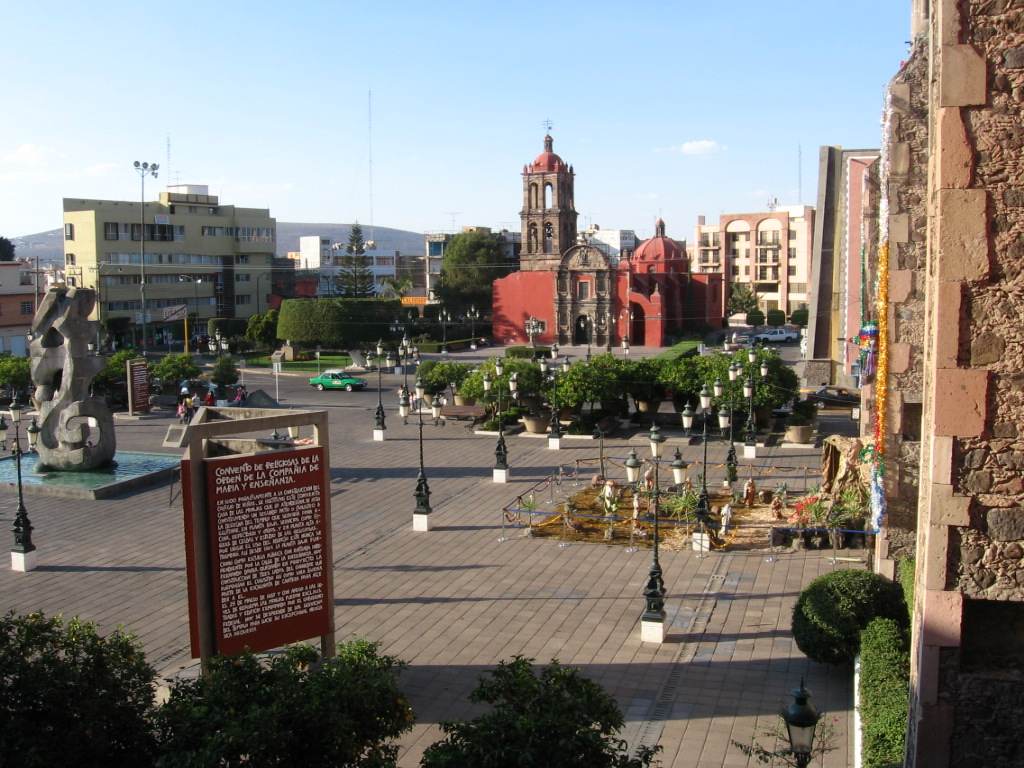
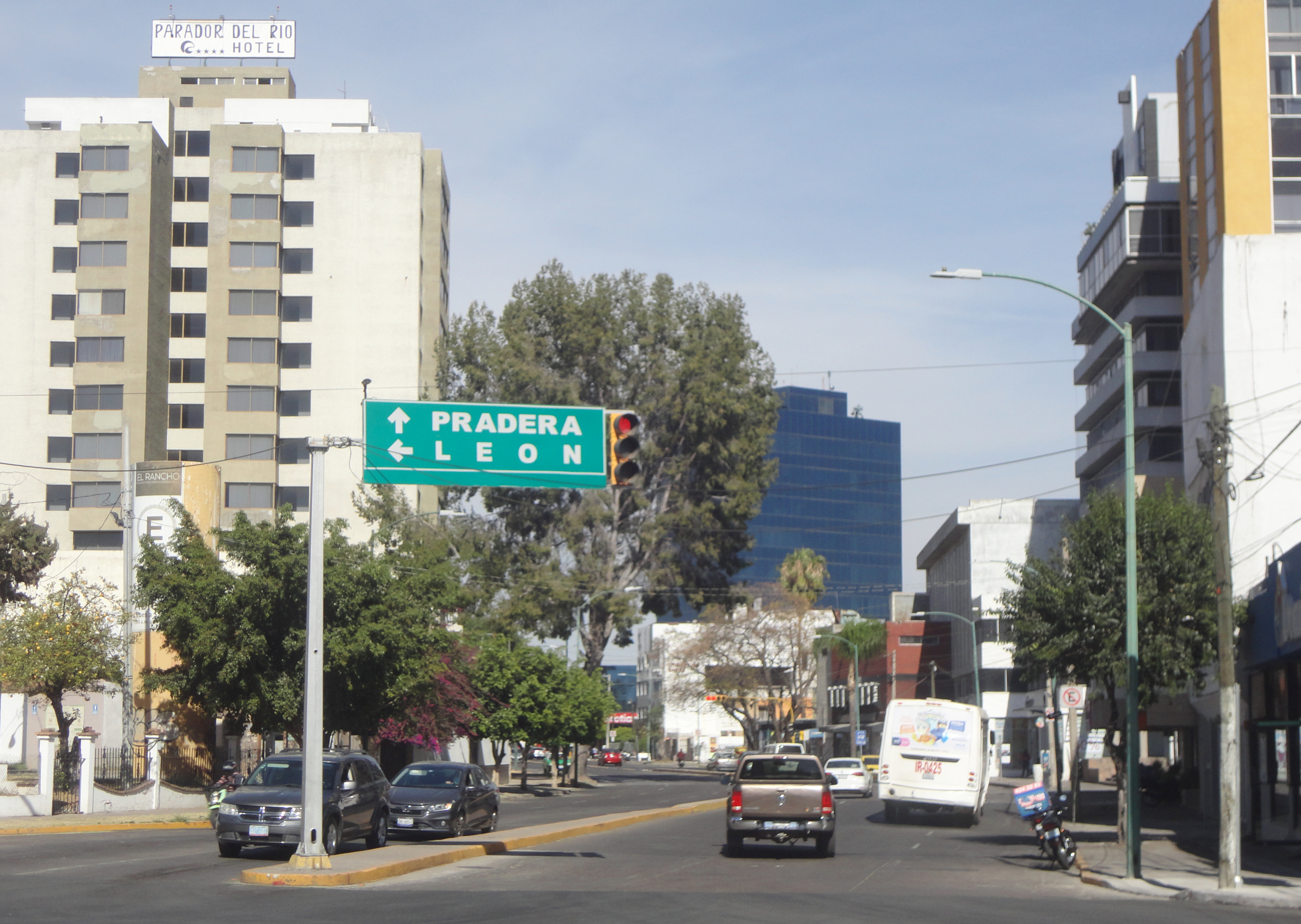
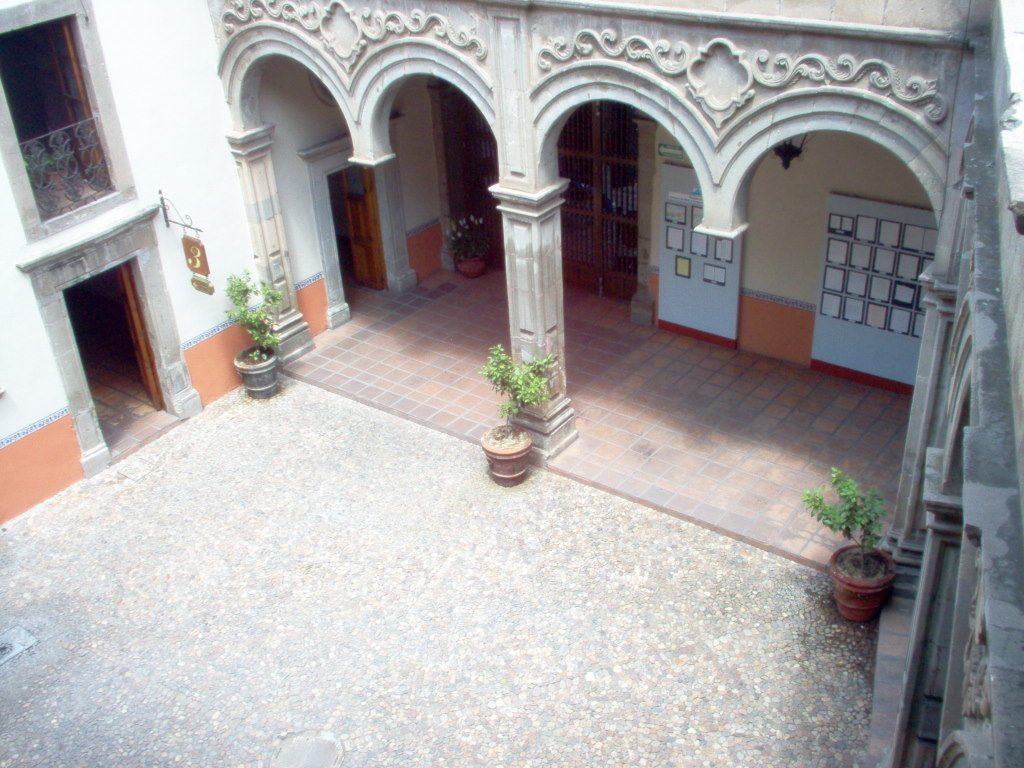
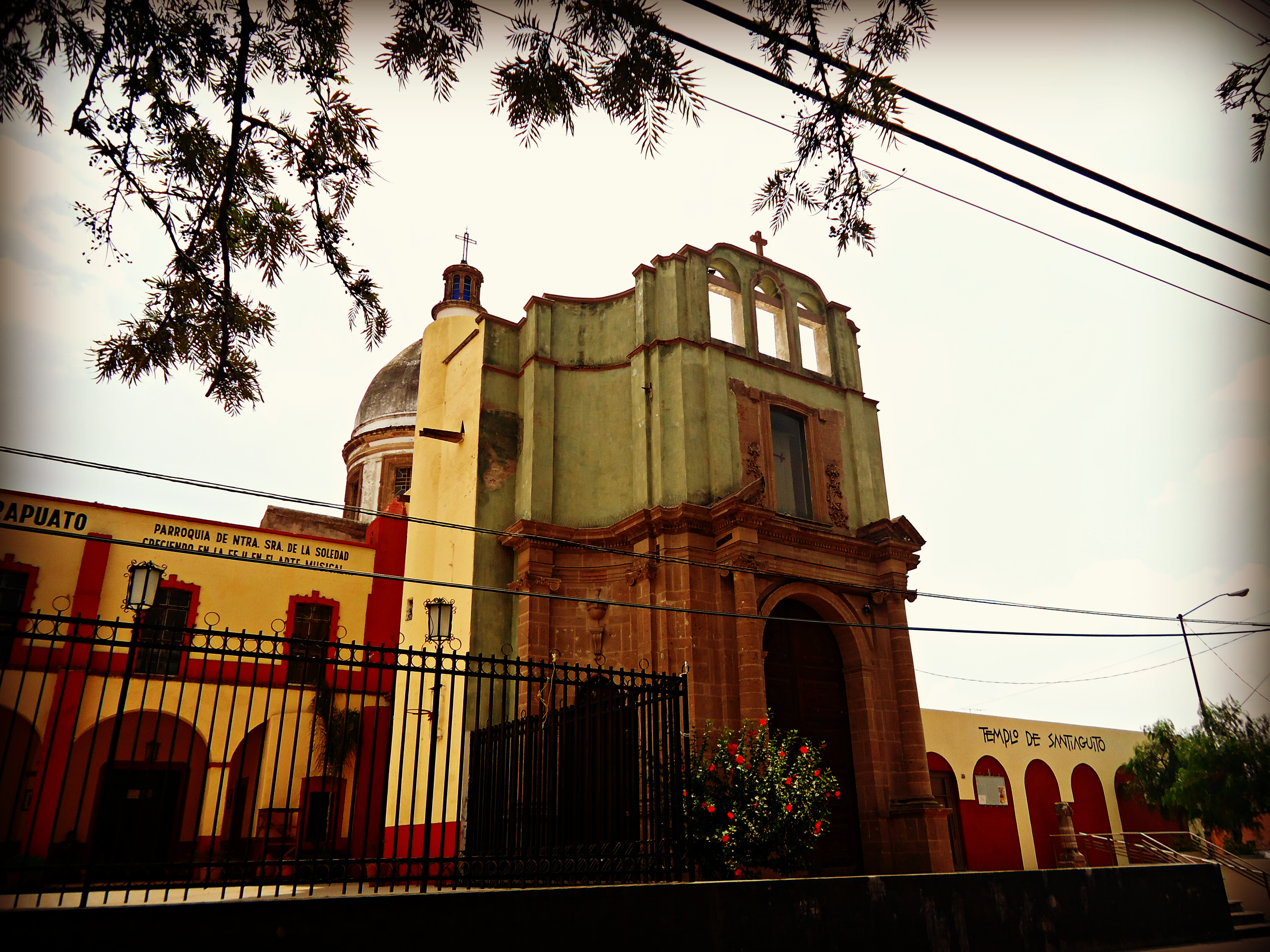
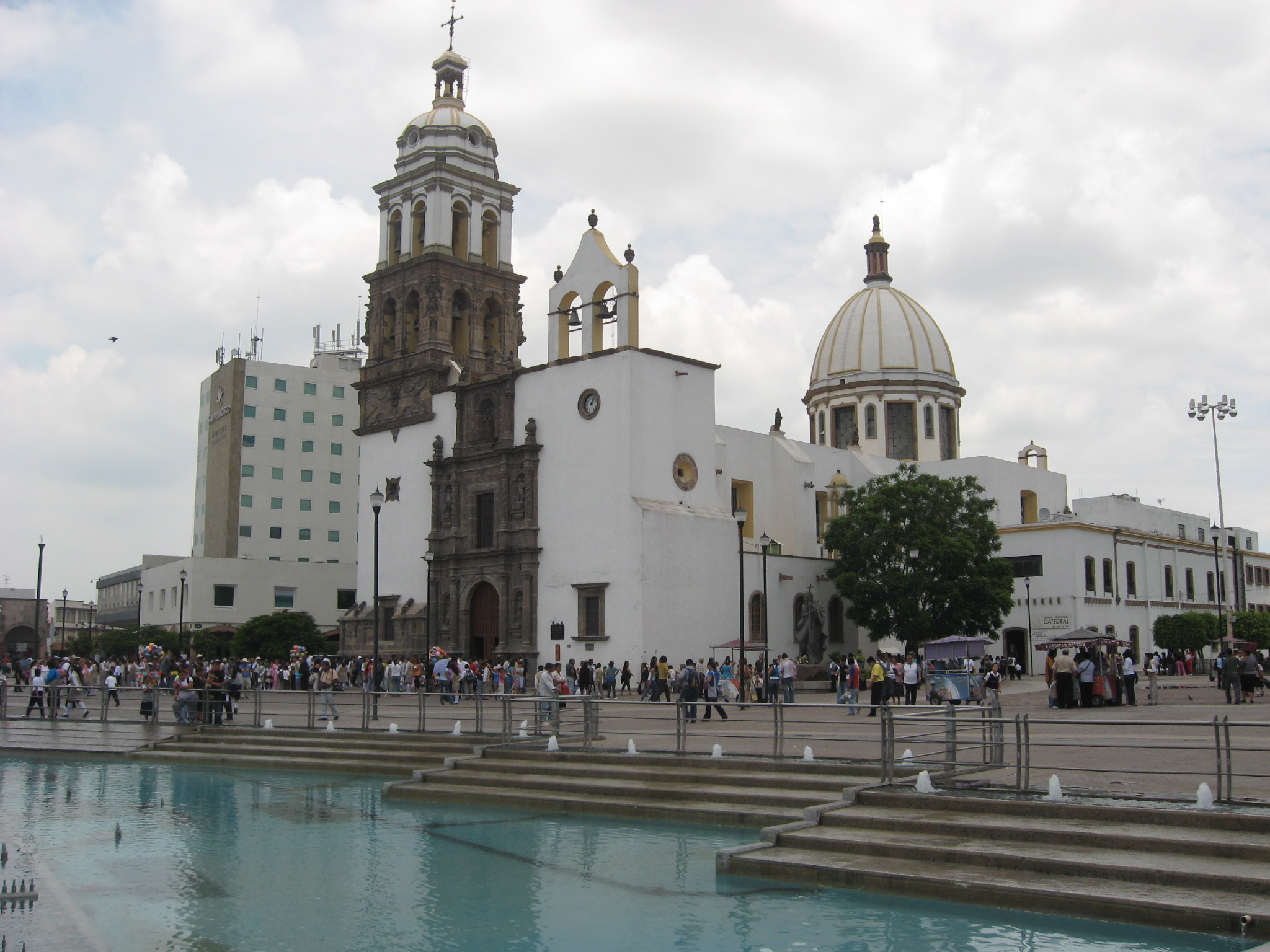
- Clockwise from upper left: Templo del Hospitalito, Centro Histórico, Zona Dorada, Museo de la Ciudad, Templo de Santiaguito and Catedral de Nuestra Señora de la Soledad.

- Flag Coat of arms
- Nickname: Spanish: Ciudad de las Fresas (English: City of the strawberries)
- Motto: Latin: Ad Augusta Per Angusta (English: To honors through difficulties)
- Location within Guanajuato Location within Mexico
- Coordinates: 20°40′N 101°21′W
- Country: Mexico
- State: Guanajuato
- Municipality: Irapuato
- Founded: February 15, 1547
- Founded as: Congregación de San Marcos Irapuato
- Founder: Vasco de Quiroga

Government
  - Municipal President: Lorena del Carmen Alfaro García

Area
  - City: 69.68 km^{2} (26.90 sq mi)
  - Municipality: 851 km^{2} (329 sq mi)
- Elevation: 1,724 m (5,656 ft)

Population (2020 census)
  - City: 452,090
  - Density: 6,488/km^{2} (16,800/sq mi)
  - Municipality: 592,953
  - Municipality density: 697/km^{2} (1,800/sq mi)
- Demonym(s): Irapuatense, Fresero
- Time zone: UTC-6 (Central Standard Time)
- ZIP code: 36590 - 36899
- Area code: 462
- Website: Official Website of the City of Irapuato
- Average temperature 19°C

Irapuato is a Mexican city and municipality located at the foot of the Arandas Hill (in Spanish: Cerro de Arandas), in the central region of the state of Guanajuato. It lies between the Silao River and the Guanajuato River, a tributary of the Lerma River, at 1,724 m (5,656 ft) above sea level. It is located at 20°40′N 101°21′W. The city is the second-largest in the state (only behind León), with a population of 342,561 according to the 2005 census, while its municipality has a population of 529,440. The municipality has an area of 851 km^{2} (329 sq mi) and includes numerous smaller outlying communities. Although it is now an important center for regional trade and transportation center as well the site of several automotive and chemical manufacturing plants, the city's main industry has historically been agriculture and it has long been known for its strawberries and industry of refried beans, also the raising of pigs and cattle. The fruits and flowers of Irapuato's luxurious gardens are well known throughout Mexico.

== History ==
=== Prehispanic era ===
In the pre-Hispanic era, the site was inhabited by the Chichimecas (c. 1200 AD), a group of semi-nomadic hunter-gatherers. Later on, the Purépechas conquered the region and initiated the establishment of a permanent settlement. They constructed buildings in the Purépecha architectural style, produced pottery, and practiced agriculture. They called the settlement Xiriquitzio (or Iriquitzio), which the Spanish conquerors pronounced "Jiricuato" (or Jiricuicho), which meant "the place with houses (or low dwellings)". The initial growth period, however, was short-lived. The downfall of the Purépecha Empire led to the abandonment of the settlement, at which point it was once again inhabited by the Chichimecas.

=== Conquest ===
In the 16th century, vasts amounts of silver ore were discovered at the present day site of the capital city of Guanajuato. This discovery led to a massive migration of Spanish settlers to the area.

=== Flood ===
On 18 August 1973, thousands of homes were destroyed and an estimated 200 or 300 people killed when a dam burst, sending a seven-foot (2.1 m) high wall of water crashing into the city. Many people were left stranded on roofs and high places for days before they were rescued.

=== Massacres ===
Mass shootings occurred at drug rehabilitation centers on 6 June and 1 July 2020. In 2025, mass shootings occurred at drug rehabilitation centres.

== Folklore ==
Fresa con crema (strawberries and cream) is a popular dish in the city, and the locals of Irapuato claim that their strawberries are particularly delicious due to a meteor that purportedly crash-landed upstream from many of the agricultural farms in the surrounding areas many years ago. The ambiguous origins of this myth and lack of any formal investigations or studies renders this as still simply a folktale of the region, but is a commonly cited story by locals.

== Geography ==
=== Climate ===
It has a hot semi-arid climate (Köppen climate classification: BSh) bordering on a humid subtropical climate (Köppen climate classification: Cwa) with an average temperature of 20 °C (68 °F). The large majority of rainfall occurs from June - September. It is at an altitude above sea level of 1,724 meters (5,656 ft).

Climate data for Irapuato (1991-2020, extremes 1971-present)
Month	Jan	Feb	Mar	Apr	May	Jun	Jul	Aug	Sep	Oct	Nov	Dec	Year
Record high °C (°F)	32.0 (89.6)	35.5 (95.9)	36.5 (97.7)	38.0 (100.4)	42.1 (107.8)	38.0 (100.4)	35.0 (95.0)	33.0 (91.4)	34.0 (93.2)	34.0 (93.2)	33.0 (91.4)	32.5 (90.5)	42.1 (107.8)
Mean daily maximum °C (°F)	25.5 (77.9)	27.7 (81.9)	30.2 (86.4)	32.4 (90.3)	33.1 (91.6)	30.7 (87.3)	28.6 (83.5)	28.4 (83.1)	27.9 (82.2)	28.3 (82.9)	27.5 (81.5)	26.0 (78.8)	28.9 (84.0)
Daily mean °C (°F)	16.0 (60.8)	17.9 (64.2)	20.1 (68.2)	22.7 (72.9)	24.2 (75.6)	23.4 (74.1)	22.0 (71.6)	21.8 (71.2)	21.3 (70.3)	20.4 (68.7)	18.4 (65.1)	16.4 (61.5)	20.4 (68.7)
Mean daily minimum °C (°F)	6.5 (43.7)	8.1 (46.6)	10.1 (50.2)	13.1 (55.6)	15.3 (59.5)	16.2 (61.2)	15.5 (59.9)	15.2 (59.4)	14.7 (58.5)	12.4 (54.3)	9.4 (48.9)	6.9 (44.4)	11.9 (53.4)
Record low °C (°F)	−3.0 (26.6)	−2.5 (27.5)	0.0 (32.0)	4.0 (39.2)	5.0 (41.0)	9.5 (49.1)	6.5 (43.7)	9.0 (48.2)	4.8 (40.6)	2.0 (35.6)	0.0 (32.0)	−2.0 (28.4)	−3.0 (26.6)
Average precipitation mm (inches)	10.4 (0.41)	10.2 (0.40)	7.5 (0.30)	6.1 (0.24)	30.2 (1.19)	124.0 (4.88)	171.4 (6.75)	140.6 (5.54)	112.4 (4.43)	37.2 (1.46)	9.0 (0.35)	4.3 (0.17)	663.3 (26.11)
Average precipitation days (≥ 0.1 mm)	1.4	1.2	1.4	1.6	4.8	10.8	15.9	13.4	10.8	4.2	1.6	1.0	68.1
Source: Servicio Meteorologico Nacional

== Transportation ==
=== Airport ===
Irapuato is a 2 or 3 hour flight from cities including Los Angeles, Houston, Dallas, Mexico City, Monterrey, Guadalajara and Puerto Vallarta, among others. Located just 25 minutes from the city of Irapuato the Del Bajío International Airport (officially, Guanajuato International Airport) (IATA: BJX) is an international airport located in Silao. It handles national and international air traffic of the area that includes the cities of León, Irapuato, and the state capital, Guanajuato. Guanajuato International Airport is an important connecting point for some flights from Mexico City to the United States.

=== Major highways ===
Major highways in Irapuato and their starting and ending points:

- Mexican Federal Highway 45 Ciudad Juárez, Chihuahua - Panales, Hidalgo
- Mexican Federal Highway 90 Irapuato, Guanajuato - Zapotlanejo, Jalisco
- Mexican Federal Highway 43 Salamanca, Guanajuato - Morelia, Michoacán
- Mexican Federal Highway 110 Armería, Colima - Xoconostle, Guanajuato

== Education ==
The city of Irapuato is home to some private universities including a branch of the University of the Incarnate Word, a Catholic university based in the United States, and a single public university, the Higher Technological Institute of Irapuato (ITESI).

The city is also home to a research center of the Center for Advanced Research and Studies (CINVESTAV) specializing in plant biotechnology and genetics and the newly created National Center of Plant Genomics.

== Sport ==
The local football team is Irapuato FC, also known as La Trinca.

=== Stadiums and arenas ===
- Estadio Sergio Leon Chavez
- Plaza de Toros
- Parque Irekua
- Golf Club Santa Margarita

== Notable people ==
=== Artists, Actors and Singers ===
- Chucho Navarro: A legendary singer and composer who was a founding member of the world-renowned romantic bolero group Trio Los Panchos. His music completely shaped the romantic bolero genre globally.
- Amalia Macías: A classic traditional folk singer and actress who widely toured Europe and Latin America in the mid-to-late 20th century, promoting Mexican ranchera music.
- Enrique del Moral: An architect of modern Mexican functionalism. He co-designed the master plan for Main UNAM Campus in Mexico City, which is today a UNESCO World Heritage site.
- Salvador Almaraz López: A legendary master painter, sculptor, and muralist. He was an important regional icon who left behind monumental artwork across Mexico, Cuba, and Chile.
- Mario Castañeda: One of the most famous voice actors in the Spanish-speaking world. He is universally known across Latin America as the iconic Spanish voice of Goku in the Dragon Ball franchise.
- Silvia Navarro: A massive household name in Latin American television. She is a famous lead actress who has starred in numerous hit telenovelas for TV Azteca and Televisa.
- Carolina Miranda: A successful television actress who has starred in global streaming series and mainstream telenovelas.
- Natalia Guerrero: A successful television actress who has starred in mainstream telenovelas.
- Dani Flow: A polarizing, highly viral modern reggaeton and urban artist known colloquially as El Rey del Morbo.
- Marsella Reynolds (@marsellareynolds): A major digital content creator with over 1.3 million followers on TikTok, focusing on family and lifestyle.
- Bettina Guisa: A well-known health and fitness blogger and digital creator active in the Mexican lifestyle space.

=== Athletes ===
- Carlos Cordero – running athlete for Mexico at the 2012 London Olympics.
- Roberto Alvarado – soccer player who plays for Chivas de Guadalajara in the Liga MX, and the Mexico National Team.
- Francisco Rotllán – soccer player who played for Mexico at the 1992 Summer Olympics in Barcelona.
- Sergio Ávila – soccer player who played for Chivas de Guadalajara and the Mexico U-23 national team.
- José Antonio Patlán – soccer player who played for Chivas de Guadalajara in 2006
- Óscar Razo – soccer player who played for Club Atlas.
- Juan Zaragoza – soccer player for Atlante FC in 2005
- Gerardo Gómez – soccer player for Hometown Club Irapuato FC
- Francisco Razo – soccer player for Hometown Club Irapuato FC

=== Clergy ===
- Samuel Ruiz García: A prominent Catholic bishop and human rights defender. He became globally known for brokering peace and defending indigenous rights in Chiapas, earning international recognition and multiple Nobel Peace Prize nominations.

=== Politicians ===
- Miguel Ángel Chico Herrera: President of PRI from 2005 to 2009.

== Images ==
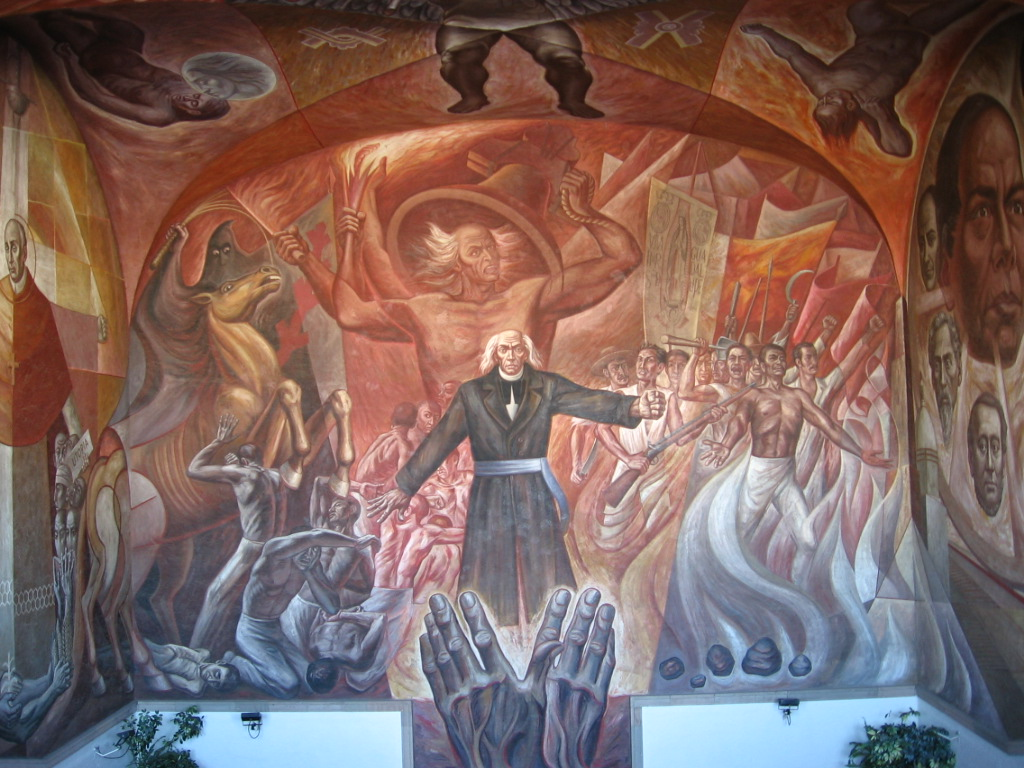
Mural depicting Miguel Hidalgo y Costilla and the Mexican Independence movement.

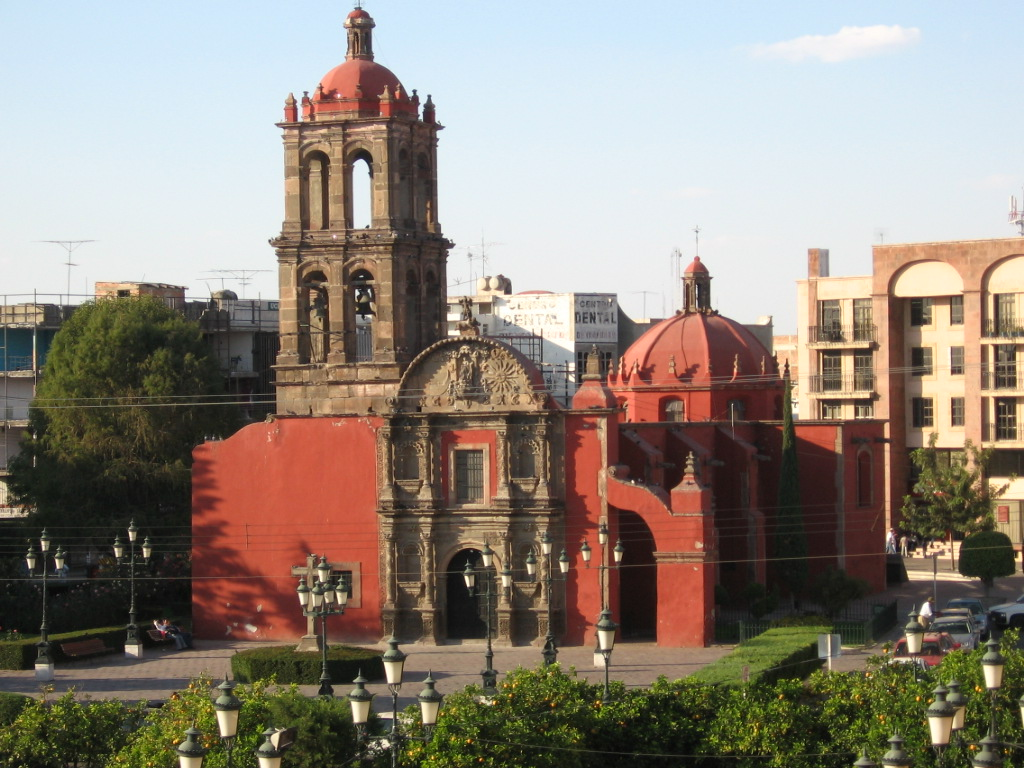
Hospitalito Church

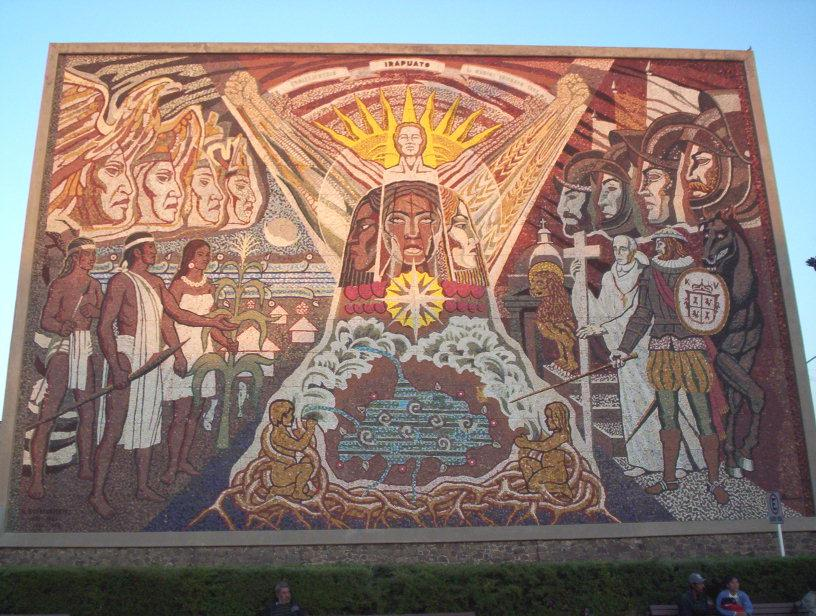
Mural depicting Irapuato's Purépecha and Spanish history

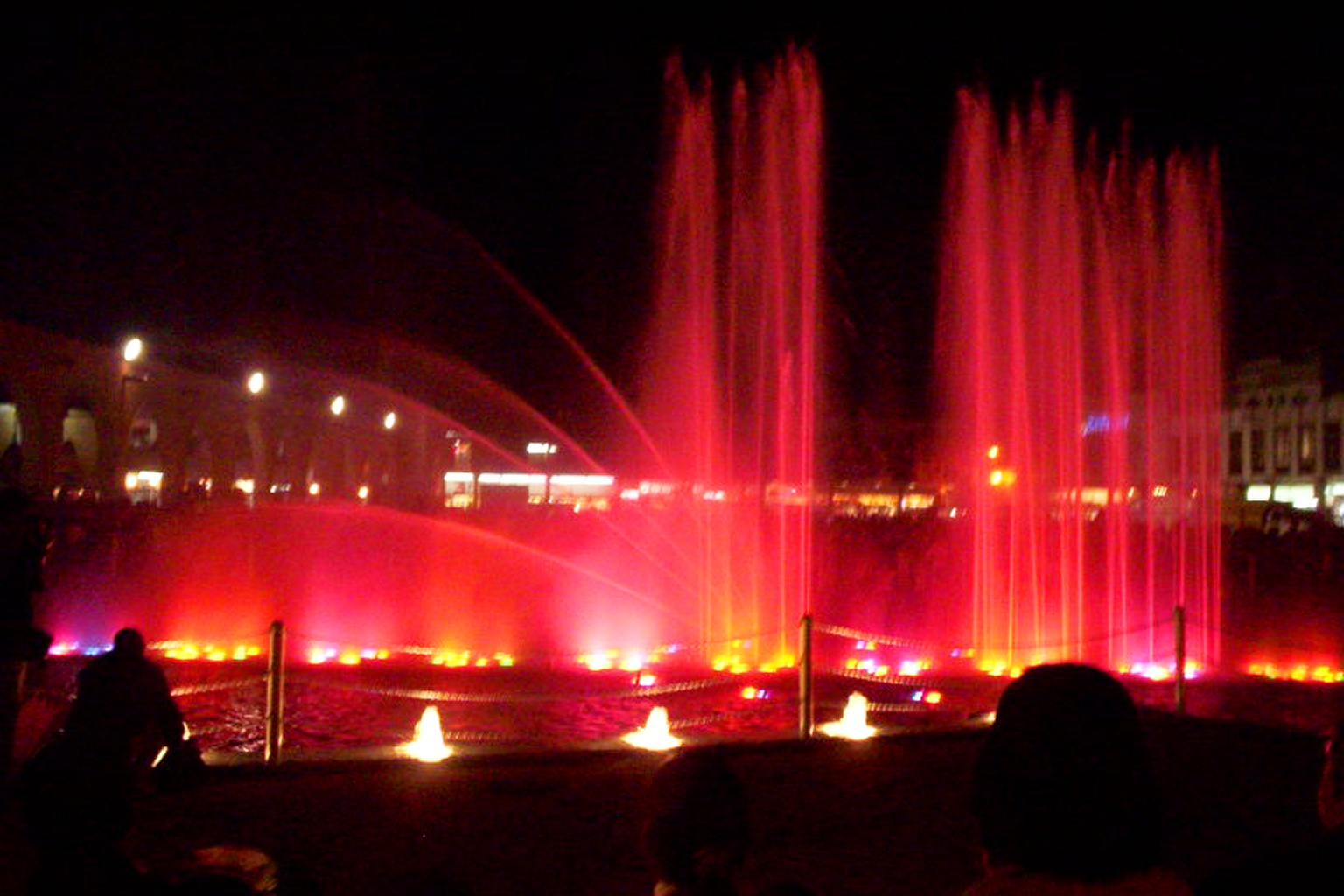
Aguas Danzarinas Fountain

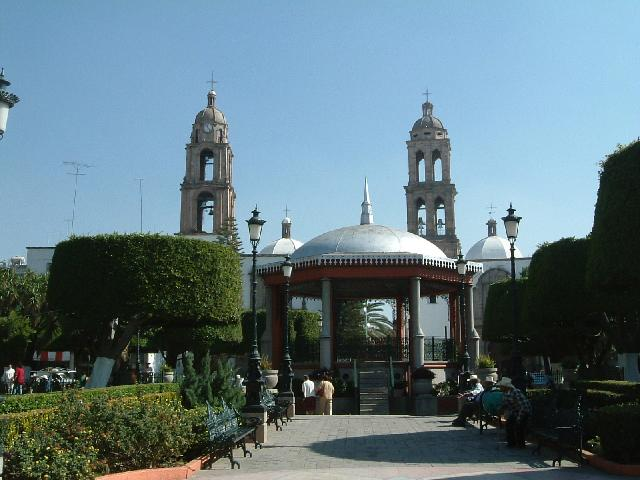
Irapuato's Hidalgo Garden

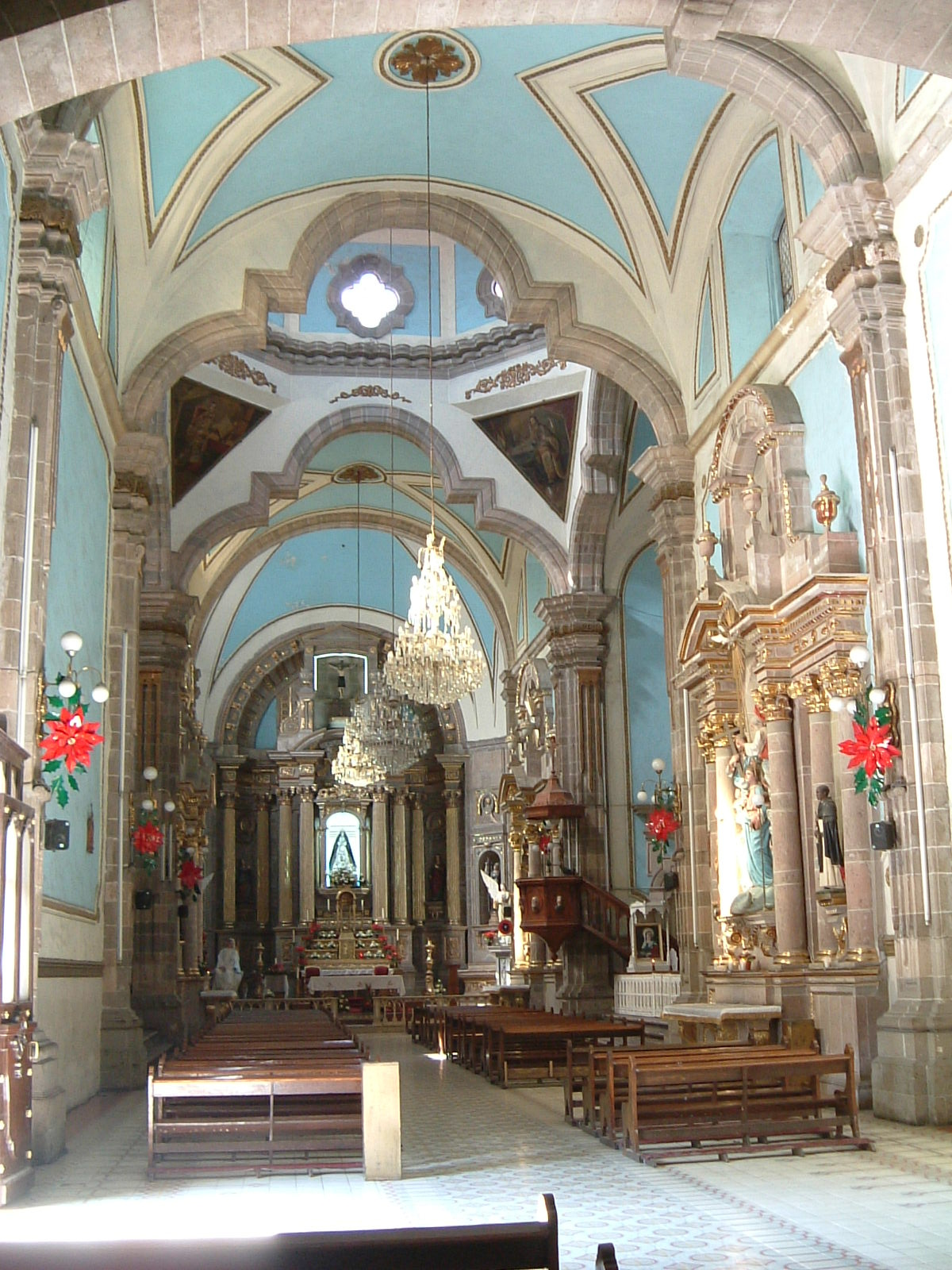
Templo de la Soledad

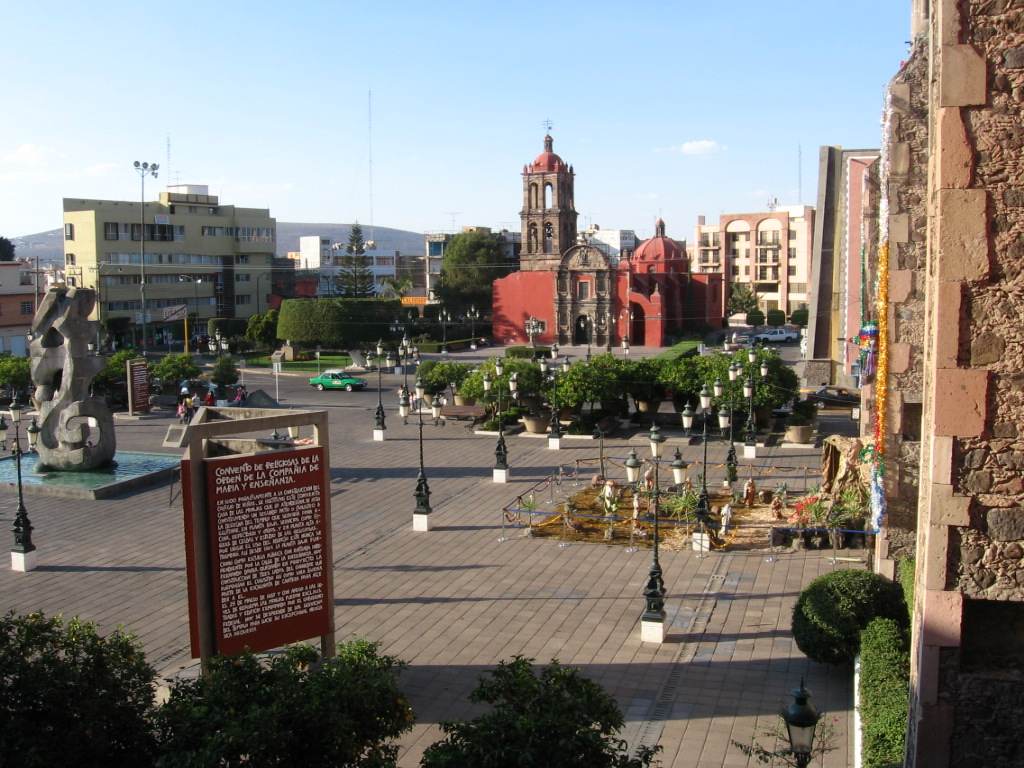
Plaza de Los Fundadores

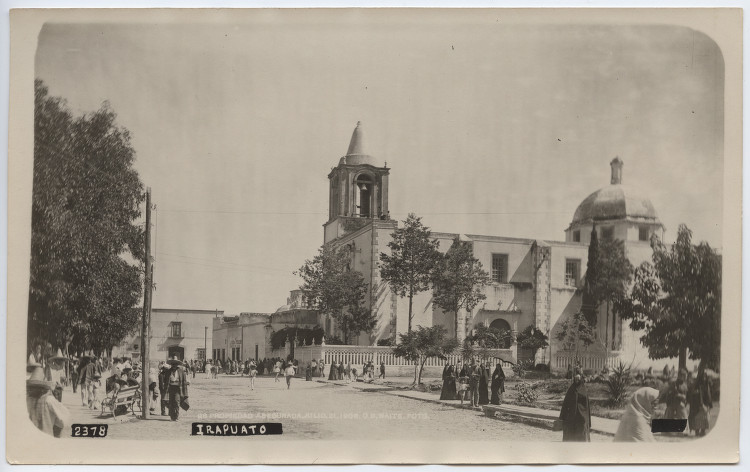
Tercera Orden's Church, circa 1907. Photo courtesy SMU

== Sister cities ==
- Aguascalientes, Aguascalientes, Mexico
- Green Bay, Wisconsin, United States
- Houston, Texas, United States
- Chula Vista, California, United States
- Laredo, Texas, United States
- Marianao, Havana, Cuba
- McAllen, Texas, United States
- Murcia, Murcia, Spain
