= Juan Zaragoza (footballer) =

Mexican footballer (born 1984)

Personal information
- Full name: Juan Carlos Zaragoza Murillo
- Date of birth: 13 January 1984 (age 42)
- Place of birth: Irapuato, Guanajuato, Mexico
- Height: 1.68 m (5 ft 6 in)
- Position: Defender

Team information
- Current team: Club León
- Number: 16

Senior career*
| Years | Team | Apps | (Gls) |
| 2003–2004 | Acapulco | 13 | (0) |
| 2004 | Atlante F.C. | 1 | (0) |
| 2004–2005 | Ciudad Obregón | 26 | (0) |
| 2005 | Dorados de Sinaloa | 8 | (0) |
| 2005 | Club León | 3 | (0) |
| 2005–2006 | Atlante F.C. | 6 | (0) |
| 2006–2007 | Club León | 26 | (0) |
| 2007–2008 | Dorados de Sinaloa | 8 | (0) |
| 2008 | Club León | 4 | (0) |
- * Club domestic league appearances and goals

Juan Carlos Zaragoza Murillo (born January 13, 1984) is a Mexican footballer. He last played for Club León in the Liga de Ascenso.

Zaragoza joined Mexican side Atlante F.C. during the Apertura 2005 championship, having previously played in the Primera División de México with Dorados de Sinaloa.

His father El Guallo Zaragoza was also a professional soccer player for Club Irapuato.
