= Flag of Guanajuato =

- Use: Civil and state flag
- Proportion: 4:7
- Adopted: December 20, 2023
- Design: Solid white with the Guanajuato coat of arms in the center with a golden mark in the border.

The Flag of Guanajuato is the flag used by the Mexican state of Guanajuato. The flag was adopted on December 20, 2023. The State Flag consists of a white rectangle with a ratio of four to seven between the width and length; in the center it bears the State Coat of arms with a golden mark, placed in such a way that it occupies three-quarters of the width.

== Design and symbolism ==
The meaning of the colors of the state flag are as follows:

Name	Color	HEX Code	Symbol
White		#FFFFFF	Liberty
Gold		#F1BF00	Richness

=== Other flags ===
Flag of New Spain (1521–1821)

== History ==
The first flag of the state of Guanajuato was officially adopted in 2023, it is a white banner with the entity's coat of arms with a golden mark.

In modern times, in order to have a flag, a first green banner appeared with a blue stripe at the bottom, the design is attributed to the state government of Vicente Fox, in 1996. It continued to be evaluated and discussed, but It never had official legislation; at the end of the governor's term, the government flag ceased to be used and valid among the people of Guanajuato state.

On December 20, 2023, the first official state flag was established, to celebrate the 200 years of the creation of the state of Guanajuato. The state congress designated December 20 as Flag Day of the State of Guanajuato. On this date, the authorities carry out civic days in commemoration, respect and exaltation of the state flag.

=== Historical flags ===
Flag of Guanajuato (1998–2023)

== Related pages ==
- List of Mexican flags
