= Armando Hernández =

Armando Hernández may refer to:

- Armando Hernández (actor), Mexican television and film actor
- Armando Rangel Hernández (born 1965), Mexican politician
- Armando Hernandez Jr. (born 1999), perpetrator of the 2020 Westgate Entertainment District shooting
