= 2nd federal electoral district of Guanajuato =

Federal electoral district of Mexico

Guanajuato's 2nd
- Electoral district of the Chamber of Deputies of Mexico

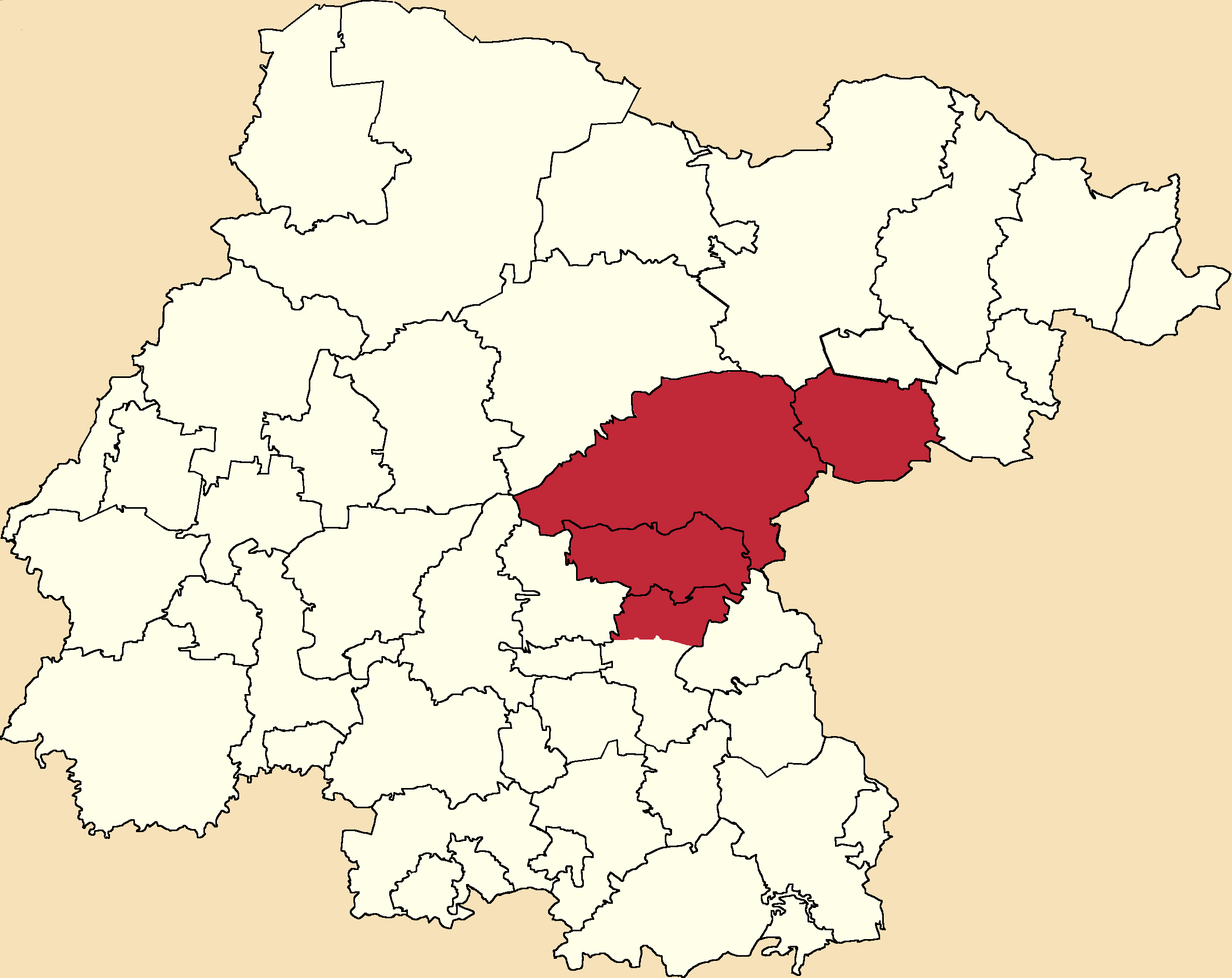
- 2nd district since 2017

Incumbent
- Member: Alma Rosa de la Vega
- Party: ▌Morena
- Congress: 66th (2024–2027)

District
- State: Guanajuato
- Head town: San Miguel de Allende
- Coordinates: 20°55′N 100°45′W
- Covers: 4 municipalities: San Miguel de Allende, Celaya (part), Comonfort, San José Iturbide
- PR region: Second
- Precincts: 217
- Population: 435,292 (2020 census)

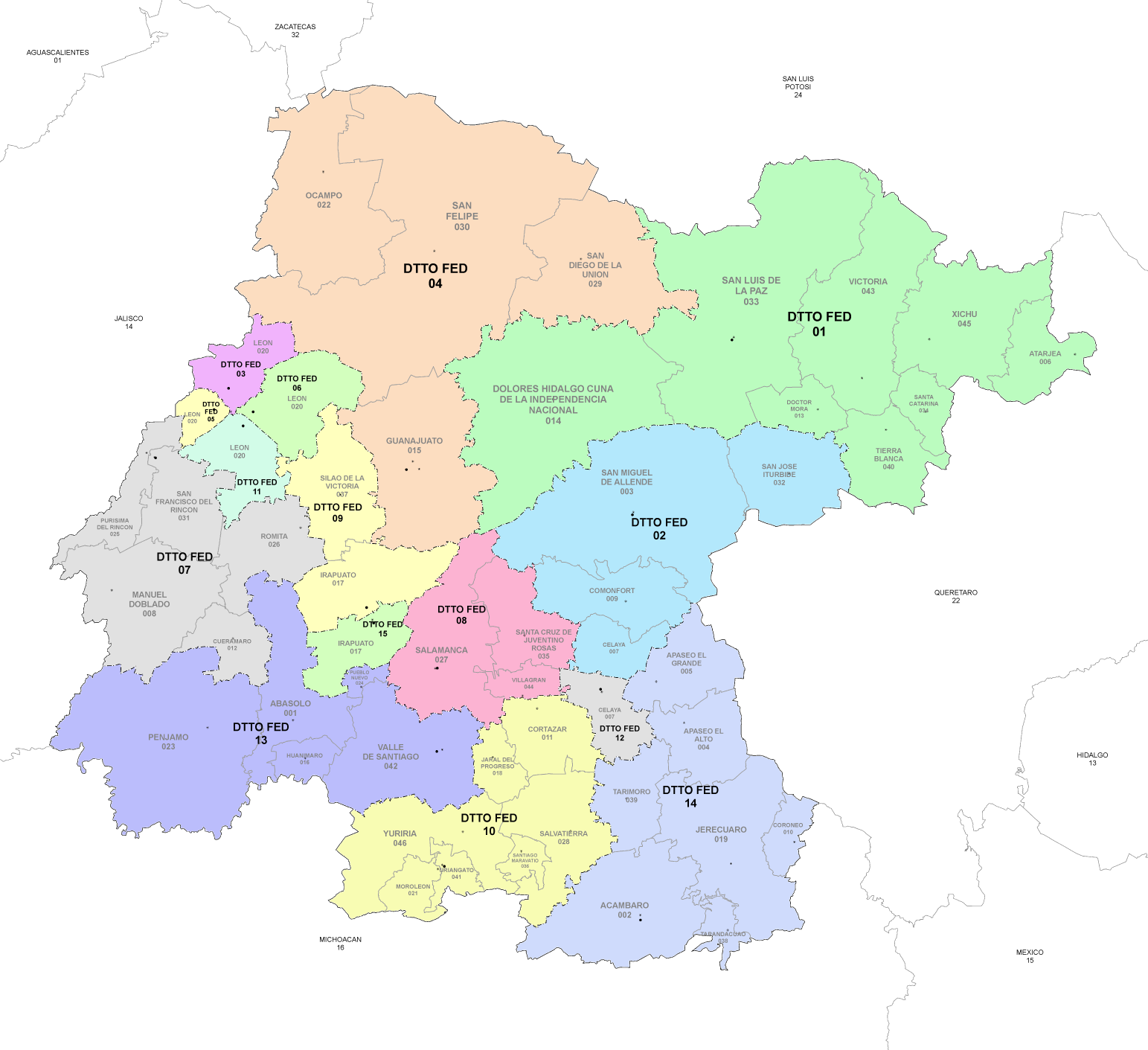
2023 districting scheme for Guanajuato

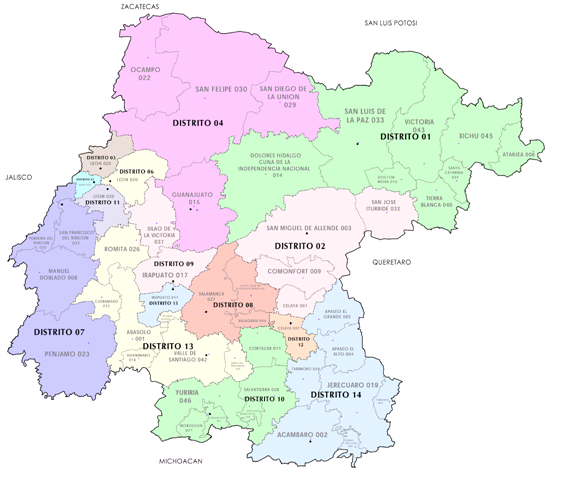
Guanajuato's districts in 2017–2022

The 2nd federal electoral district of Guanajuato (Spanish: Distrito electoral federal 02 de Guanajuato) is one of the 300 electoral districts into which Mexico is divided for elections to the federal Chamber of Deputies and one of 15 such districts in the state of Guanajuato.

It elects one deputy to the lower house of Congress for each three-year legislative session by means of the first-past-the-post system. Votes cast in the district also count towards the calculation of proportional representation ("plurinominal") deputies elected from the second region.

The current member for the district, elected in the 2024 general election, is Alma Rosa de la Vega Vargas of the National Regeneration Movement (Morena).

== District territory ==
Under the 2023 districting plan adopted by the National Electoral Institute (INE), which is to be used for the 2024, 2027 and 2030 federal elections, Guanajuato's 2nd district comprises 217 electoral precincts (secciones electorales) across four of the state's 46 municipalities:

- San Miguel de Allende, Celaya (32 precincts), Comonfort and San José Iturbide. (Note: The bulk of Celaya – 216 precincts – is assigned to the 12th district.)

The head town (cabecera distrital), where results from individual polling stations are gathered together and tallied, is the city of San Miguel de Allende. The district reported a population of 435,292 in the 2020 census.

== Previous districting schemes ==
Evolution of electoral district numbers
	1974	1978	1996	2005	2017	2023
Guanajuato	9	13	15	14	15	15
Chamber of Deputies	196	300				

2017–2022

Between 2017 and 2022, the 2nd district had the same configuration as in the 2023 plan.

2005–2017

Under the 2005 plan, Guanajuato had only 14 districts. This district's head town was at San Miguel de Allende and it covered five municipalities:
- San Miguel de Allende, Comonfort and San José Iturbide, as in the later schemes, plus Doctor Mora and Tierra Blanca.

1996–2005

In the 1996 scheme, under which Guanajuato was assigned 15 seats, the district had its head town at San Miguel de Allende and it comprised nine municipalities:
- San Miguel de Allende, Doctor Mora, San José Iturbide and Tierra Blanca, as in the 2005 plan, plus Atarjea, San Luis de la Paz, Santa Catarina, Victoria and Xichú.

1978–1996

The districting scheme in force from 1978 to 1996 was the result of the 1977 electoral reforms, which increased the number of single-member seats in the Chamber of Deputies from 196 to 300. Under that plan, Guanajuato's seat allocation rose from 9 to 13. The 2nd district's head town was at León and it covered a part of that city and its surrounding municipality.

== Deputies returned to Congress ==
(Mexico) National parties
- Current
- PAN
- PRI
- PT
- PVEM
- MC
- Morena
- PAZ
- Somos
- Defunct or local only
- PLM
- PNR
- PRM
- PNM
- PP
- PPS
- PARM
- PFCRN
- CON
- PANAL
- PSD
- PES
- PES
- PRD

Guanajuato's 2nd district
Election	Deputy	Party	Term	Legislature
1916	Vicente M. Valtierra		1916–1917	Constituent Congress of Querétaro
...
1976	Enrique Gómez Guerra	Institutional Revolutionary Party	1976–1979	50th Congress
1979	Rafael Hernández Ortiz	Institutional Revolutionary Party	1979–1982	51st Congress
1982	Carlos Machiavelo Marín	Institutional Revolutionary Party	1982–1985	52nd Congress
1985	Franz Ignacio Espejel Muñoz	National Action Party (Mexico)	1985–1988	53rd Congress
1988	Elías Villegas Torres	National Action Party (Mexico)	1988–1991	54th Congress
1991	Alejandro Gutiérrez de Velasco Ortiz	National Action Party (Mexico)	1991–1994	55th Congress
1994	Primo Quiroz Durán	Institutional Revolutionary Party	1994–1997	56th Congress
1997	Armando Rangel Hernández	National Action Party (Mexico)	1997–2000	57th Congress
2000	Luis Alberto Villarreal García	National Action Party (Mexico)	2000–2003	58th Congress
2003	Armando Rangel Hernández	National Action Party (Mexico)	2003–2006	59th Congress
2006	Martín Stefanonni Mazzocco	National Action Party (Mexico)	2006–2009	60th Congress
2009	Juan de Jesús Pascualli Gómez (Note: Pascualli Gómez died on 29 April 2010 and was replaced for the remainder of his term by his alternate, Agundiz Pérez.); Laura Viviana Agundiz Pérez	National Action Party (Mexico)	2009–2010; 2010–2012	61st Congress
2012	Ricardo Villarreal García	National Action Party (Mexico)	2012–2015	62nd Congress
2015	María Verónica Agundis Estrada	National Action Party (Mexico)	2015–2018	63rd Congress
2018	Ricardo Villarreal García	National Action Party (Mexico)	2018–2021	64th Congress
2021	Ricardo Villarreal García	National Action Party (Mexico)	2021–2024	65th Congress
2024	Alma Rosa de la Vega Vargas	National Regeneration Movement	2024–2027	66th Congress

== Presidential elections ==
Guanajuato's 2nd district
Election	District won by	Party or coalition	%
2018	Ricardo Anaya Cortés	Por México al Frente	36.8525
2024	Claudia Sheinbaum Pardo	Sigamos Haciendo Historia	52.0661
