= Cañada de la Virgen =

Archaeological site in Mexico

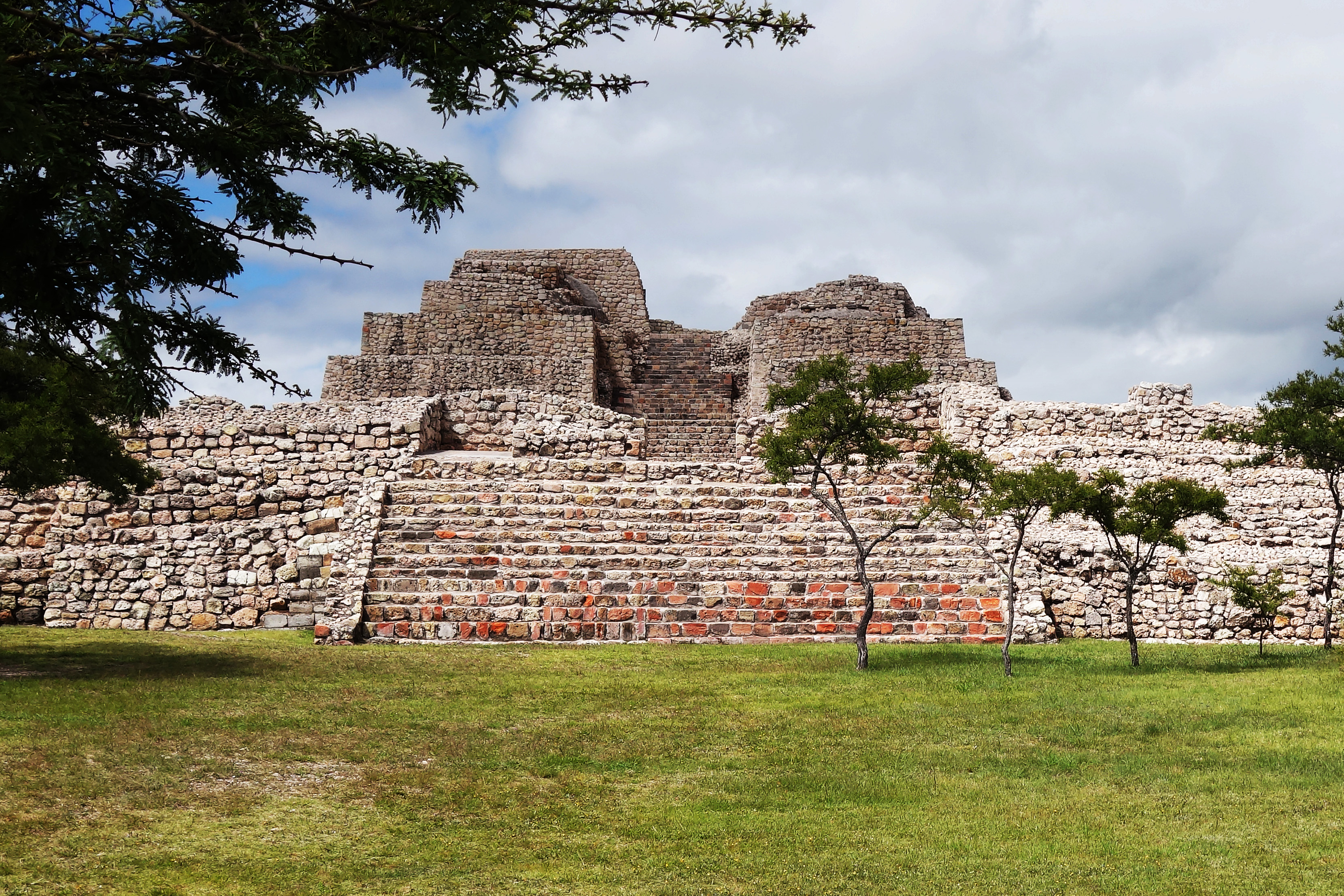
- Complex A, the House of the Thirteen Heavens

- Location of the site Cañada de la Virgen (Mexico)
- 20°51′29″N 100°55′42″W
- Periods: Late Classic to Early Postclassic
- Cultures: Otomí
- Location: San Miguel de Allende, Guanajuato, Mexico
- Region: Bajío

History
- Built: 540 AD
- Abandoned: 1040 AD

Site notes
- Archaeologists: Gabriela Zepeda García Moreno, Rossana Quiroz Ennis, Francisco Granados

Cañada de la Virgen (Spanish for Virgin's Glen) is an Otomi archaeological site in Mexico. Located in the state of Guanajuato, the site was first excavated in 1995, while the official excavation began in 2002. Public access was first allowed in 2011. However, unlike its famous counterparts such as Chichen Itza, access is strictly controlled due to it sitting on private property, one of the largest ex-haciendas in Guanajuato.

The Otomi people have lived in the valley of San Miguel de Allende for thousands of years. It is presumed that construction at Cañada De La Virgen most likely began after the collapse of the Teotihuacan culture, where they are believed to have previously resided along with other tribes in the Valley of Mexico (near Mexico City today), around 530 AD. The Otomi people were avid sky watchers and passed information down from generation to generation. These people used astronomical criteria, religious beliefs and agricultural cycles to select the Laja River Valley for the construction of this Pre-Hispanic burial site. The site faces the celestial north, where the stars spin around in a circle throughout the year. The moon moves up the stairs of the pyramid as its cycle advances. It rises and falls perfectly in pyramid notches at key times in the lunar calendar and during solstice periods.

The site was dedicated to the Moon, the Sun and Venus, as demonstrated by archaeoastronomical studies conducted by the National Institute of Anthropology and History (INAH). Its main features are: Ceremonial Avenue, House of the Wind, House of the Longest Night (scientists believe has some relationship with the Otomi's belief in the duality of the heavens and earth (Sun and Moon, man and woman, etc.) and House of the Thirteen Heavens.

Around 900 AD, the Otomi civilization began to decline and by 1050 AD, the site was abandoned, only to be rediscovered at the end of the 20th century. Work and research continue to this day.

== Site ==
On site are seven enormous architectonic structures (pyramidal structures) of different sizes and styles, that form sunken patios, squares, a game of ball, esplanades, and a 1-kilometre-long (0.62 mi) road. Ceramic superficial vestiges found suggest that the last occupation would be tied chronologically to the Toltec expansion.

This prehispanic settlement is located on the northern Mesoamerican border, its main monuments were sky observatories. Its urban design reflects cosmic cycles linked with farmers' groups' life that also were hunter-gatherer in the surrounding semi-desert regions, and traded with other Mesoamerican regions artifacts used in ritual activities.

The site shares Mesoamerican architectural-oriented patterns, i.e. the symmetry axis is directed to the Sun and Moon rise and setting (east–west), in addition to its strategic position -visual domain of the Laja river basin, where the site is located - determined the pre-Hispanic site importance for rituals and ceremonies.

The close relationship between the architectural complex construction and star cycles is mainly observed in complex A or the House of the Thirteen Heavens, a vital space for the celestial observation, whose sunken patio functioned as water mirror from which the priests could look at the sky and interpret aspects in the interests for the agricultural cycle.

The buildings on site are located on a plateau that was artificially filled to obtain an 18° tilt, thus ancient Otomi managed the Sun to pass over various points of the architectural complex, marking calendar dates linked to survival control as well as seeding and harvesting activities.

== History ==
The Toltec–Chichimec founded villages, built pyramids and other architectural structures throughout the central basin of the river now called Laja, known as San Miguel in the 16th century, and apparently, a little less than thousand years ago was called Pánuco.

According to the list of names appearing in the Toltec–Chichimec Codex, which refers to the various provinces that formed the Toltec Empire, Cañada de la Virgen would be located northwest of the Toltec territory. The name of its capital is unknown, because the name is unreadable in the abovementioned list, everything indicates it is located a few kilometers south of the site in question. It is a city made up of various architectural, elements including a ballgame court and a huge plaza with three pyramid foundations.

Furnaces remains found in the northeast area demonstrate that members of this society were capable of limestone deposits exploitation. The Seven onsite architectural structures, considered monumental as exceed the human scale, are huge step pyramids with sloped sides of different sizes and styles that form various spaces, such as sunken patios, squares, esplanades, a 1,000-metre-long (3,300 ft) road.

== Occupation chronology ==
According to surface ceramic vestiges (plumbate), the last occupation would be linked to the maximum Toltec expansion.

The historical overview of the region begins in the preclassical period with the Chupícuaro tradition, very important in Mesoamerica. This tradition is characterized by its advanced ceramic industry and its complex religious expressions, which indicate at an early consolidation of a group in power. The Chupícuaro tradition was established along the banks of rivers and spread to almost the entire Guanajuato territory. Chupícuaro disappeared at about 350 AD., to allow the second tradition of advanced farmers.

Also identified as the regional development stage, the Sunken Patio tradition covers the classic and epiclassical periods (350 to 900 AD.) It distinguished itself by architectural innovation of sunken or closed patios, associated with pyramidal structures reaching monumental heights. This is considered to be the stage of advanced agricultural development and the expansion of the border northward.

During this period Guanajuato developed an organization and work specialization in governing centers. Still heavily argued and linked to the agricultural frontier withdrawal, new hypotheses about Toltec presence propose that it coincided with the arrival of proto-Toltec groups to the Basin of Mexico, between 900 and 1000 AD., and not with the collapse of Tula, Hidalgo, around 1200 AD.

Around 1350 AD., with the collapsed agricultural frontier, these lands were the scene of the development of the Chichimec tribes. With different ethnic affiliation, identified are the Guachichiles, Guamare, Copuces, Guaxabanes, Pames, and Otomi. At that time, the border between nomadic and sedentary groups was the Lerma River. At this cultural scenario epoch can be placed the prehispanic development of Cañada de la Virgen.

== Architecture ==
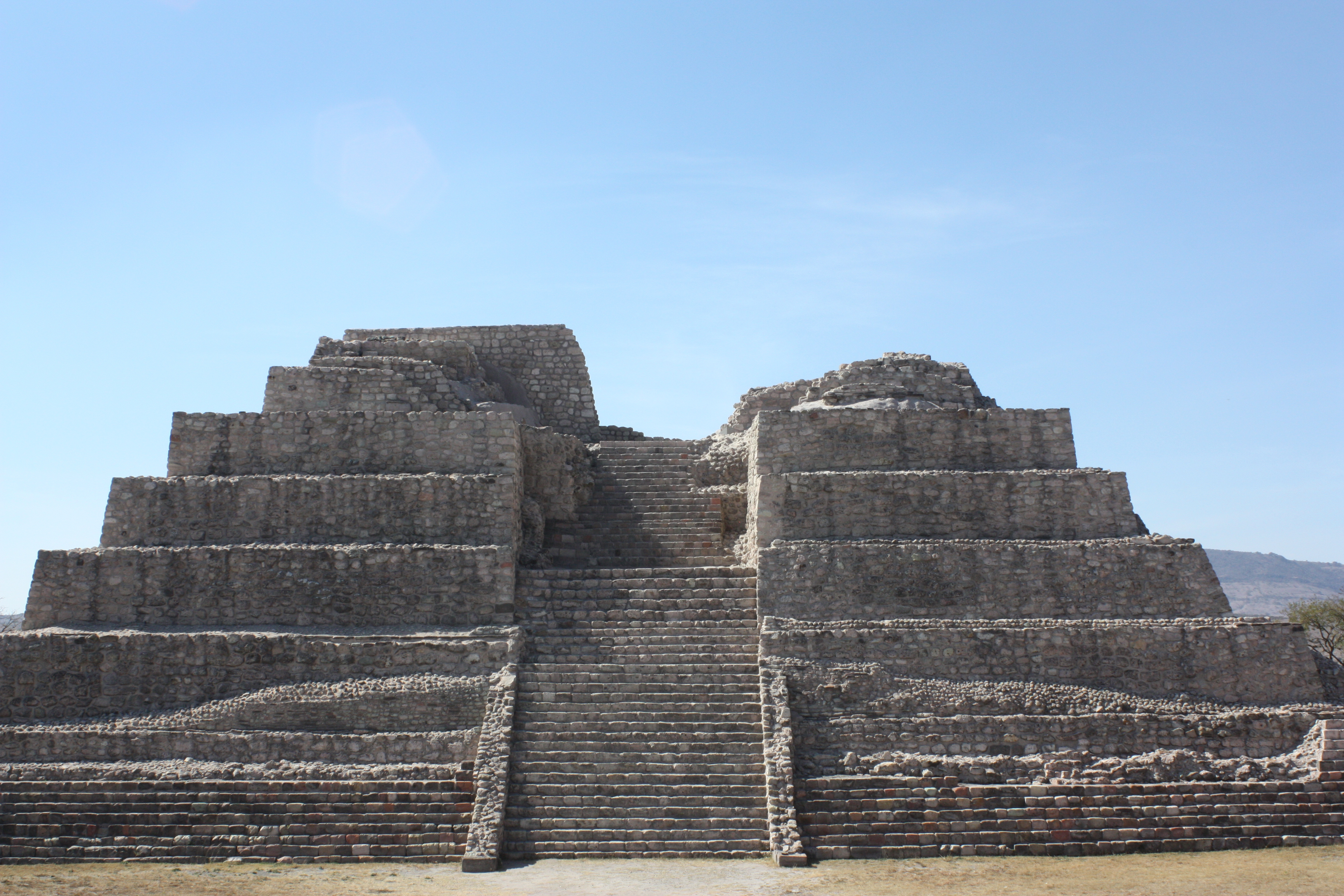
Remains of a pyramidal structure

Cañada de la Virgen consists of closely linked architectural complexes. Special note for Complex A or the House of the Thirteen Heavens - critical space for celestial observation - consists of a sunken patio, a pyramidal basement (over 15 m high) and platforms that close to the East, North and South as a whole. Funeral findings in this complex have given rise to forensic studies that have provided information about cultural and cranial deformation, burial, ancestral worship and rituals associated with the foundation of workplace practices. At the top of the complex is the Red Temple and its abstract mural, which are red and black horizontal bands which allude to the day and night.

As part of the central campus is complex B or "House of the longest night". It is an architectonic group with several structures (pyramid basement, sunken patio and platforms) which had different functions. An example is the asymmetry of the pyramidal basement (laid out Southwest), which has a room in the South side on the walls. This architectonic type is only documented in the Maya area (Yucatec Puuc) and Cañada de la Virgen. During archaeological excavations in this compound a cross section public functions and rituals substructure with was found.

== Structures ==
The site consists of five groups of monuments, the most important of which is Complex A (side annexes, Temple basement, closed patio, main esplanade, south esplanade and road).

During excavations several important archaeological items were found, such as pots (ollas, metals, seeds, human remains, etc.).

The main square, located west of the site comprises basements A and B, which are the most important. Basement A, with the largest volume and complexity, is composed of different elements: step pyramid, stairways, building or upper temple, central and side patios, esplanade and an avenue.

=== Complex A ===
As in most cases, the largest volume basement was found at the center, the remainder is distributed in all directions, configuring various squares and esplanades.

Six bodies comprise the pyramidal basement; at the top are remains of a building. The patio geometry in relation to the plaza-esplanade and eastern road denotes the domain reached by the Toltec-Chichimec architects in design and construction. The top building was divided into two sections by a central staircase, similar to late postclassical Aztec structures. It was built with stone walls plastered with mud and stucco (mixture of lime and sand) and painted red oxide (towards its penultimate occupation) and ochre (last). Indicated by remains at the southwest corner of one of the rooms that still exist, miraculously if we consider that in the late 1940s it was dynamited during an alien occupation, losing much of northwest side corner.

=== Complex B ===
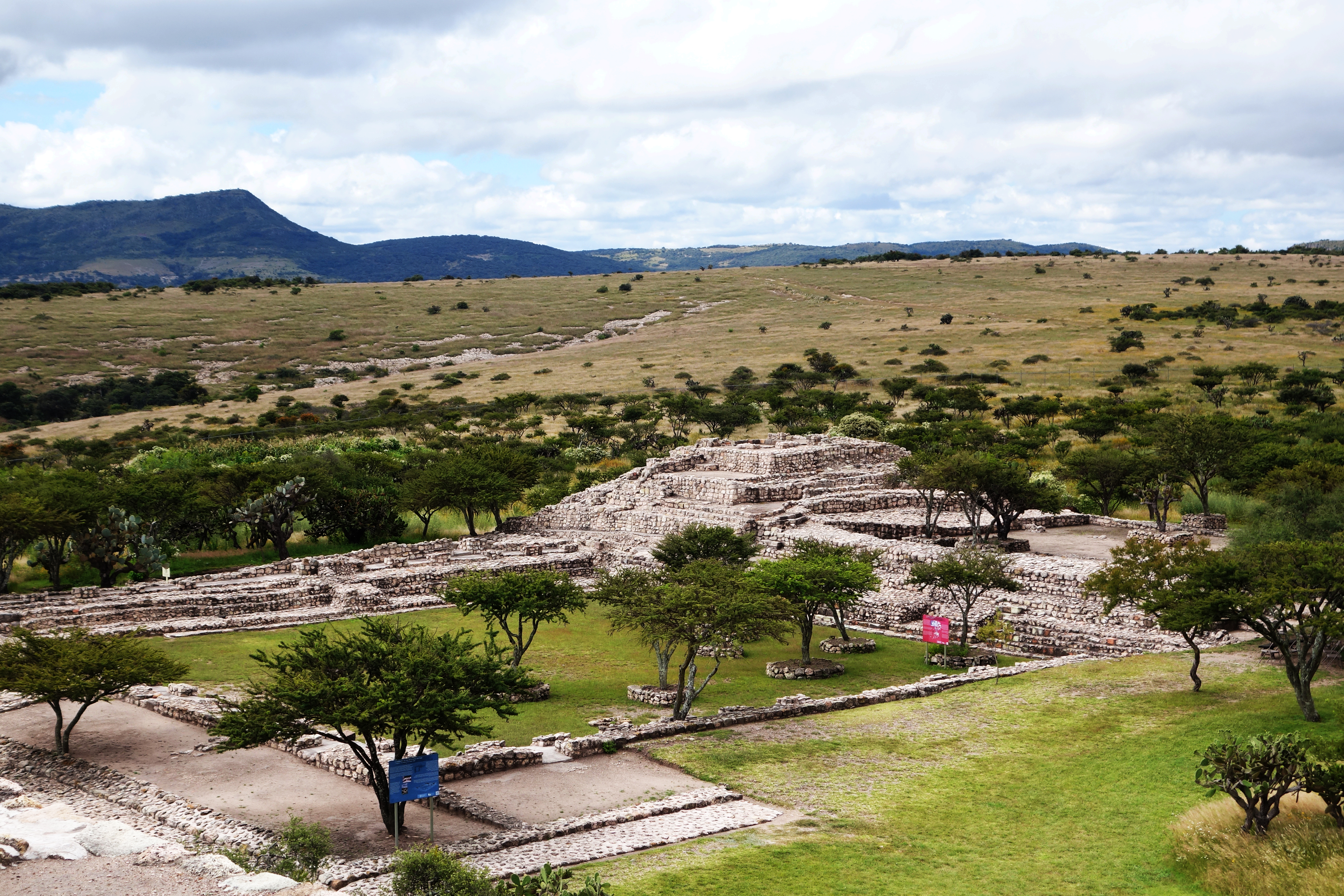
House of the Longest Night

It shares characteristics, with some small variations. In this case, the top building is a little to the south, i.e. is not centered with the plaza. To the west is a little elevated esplanade which forms part of the main square. There is some evidence there was another road, which would start at the south side of the basement to another part of the ravine surrounding the site. It is worth noting that in this structure patio remains of a stone anthropomorphic sculpture were found, consistent with what would be the head and left foot of some postclassical individual from the northern center of Mesoamerica.

=== Complex C ===
This complex has not yet been excavated (as of 2017).

=== Complex D ===
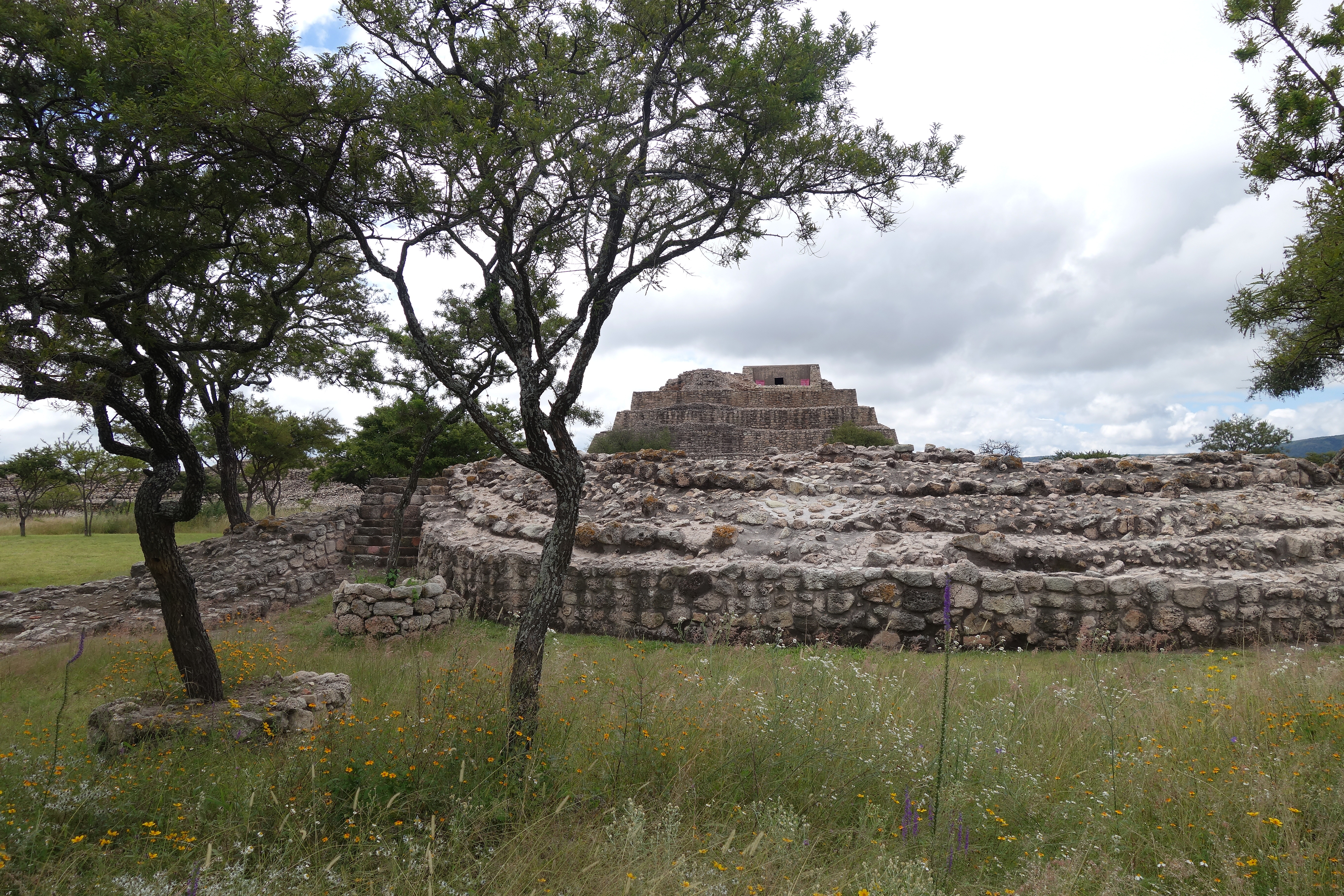
House of the Wind (foreground) and House of the Thirteen Heavens (background)

North basement, with very special features, such as a mixed base: the bottom base is rectangular, while those at top are circular; this mixture has only been found on very few structures of the region.

=== Complex E ===
The structure at the south of the complex, comprises a step pyramid basement forming an open patio to the south, unlike the others enclosed on four sides. A piece of stonework that may correspond to a frieze sector or a jamb was detected on the northeast corner of the structure.

== Restoration ==
The constant looting and vandalism in the main basement of Complex (A), mainly the large holes at the bottom, on bodies 2 and 3, made necessary in 1989 to make some partial restoration interventions (architectural volumetric restitution) to prevent the collapse of the southwest corner of the basement, the upper bodies stability was compromised.

== Visiting the site ==
The archaeological complex opened to the public on February 15, 2011. The site is open Tuesday through Sunday, from 9 am to 3 pm. For those without transportation or seeking bilingual guides, there are multiple tour operators in San Miguel de Allende that can provide expert guides and transportation.

The site is unusually protected and there are some considerations for visitors. There is a Visitor Center with parking and a museum (opened in 2017). Access to the site is only by a scheduled shuttle bus which takes visitors near the site. From there, the walk is roughly 3 km round trip, and visitors must be accompanied by an escort who will ensure that they return to their shuttle bus on schedule; round trip time from the Visitor Center is 2.5 hours. No bags, backpacks or purses are allowed into the site because of recent thefts of artifacts. Currently (March 2025) cameras are strictly prohibited, but cell phones are allowed. Visitors with mobility issues may find the tour challenging.
