= Luis Alberto Villarreal =

Mexican politician (born 1974)

Luis Alberto Villarreal García

Mayor of San Miguel de Allende
- In office September 22, 2021 – October 9, 2021
- Preceded by: Gonzalo González Ramírez
- Succeeded by: Mauricio Trejo Pureco
- In office October 10, 2018 – April 2, 2021
- Preceded by: Gonzalo González Rodríguez
- Succeeded by: Gonzalo González Ramírez
- In office October 10, 2003 – October 9, 2006
- Preceded by: Óscar Arroyo Delgado
- Succeeded by: Jesús Corra Ramírez

Member of the Chamber of Deputies by proportional representation
- In office September 1, 2012 – August 31, 2015

Senator for Guanajuato
- In office September 1, 2006 – August 31, 2012
- Preceded by: Susana Stephenson Pérez
- Succeeded by: Juan Carlos Romero Hicks

Member of the Chamber of Deputies for the 2nd district of Guanajuato
- In office September 1, 2000 – August 31, 2003
- Preceded by: Armando Rangel Hernández
- Succeeded by: Armando Rangel Hernández

Personal details
- Born: November 11, 1974 San Miguel de Allende, Guanajuato, Mexico
- Party: National Action Party
- Spouse: María Teresa Jiménez Esquivel (m. 2022)
- Education: Universidad Lasallista Benavente
- Profession: Lawyer

Luis Alberto Villarreal García (born November 11, 1974) is a Mexican politician affiliated with the National Action Party (PAN). He served as a Senator representing Guanajuato and coordinator of the National Action Party Parliamentary Group in the Chamber of Deputies LXII Legislature until August 13, 2014.

== Biography ==
He was born in San Miguel de Allende, Guanajuato, son of Alberto Villarreal Sautto and Guadalupe García Chávez.

== Career ==
Luis Alberto Villarreal graduated in Law from the Universidad Lasallista Benavente in Celaya, Guanajuato. From 1994 to 1995, he worked for a public notary, joined the PAN in 1996, held various positions, and was a regional coordinator in several political precampaigns, including the precampaign of Alfredo Ling Altamirano for governor of Guanajuato.

In 2000, he was elected federal deputy to the Congress of the Union of Mexico's LVIII Legislature for the II Federal Electoral District of Guanajuato until 2003, and that same year, he won the election for mayor of San Miguel de Allende.

During his tenure, San Miguel de Allende was the cleanest city in Mexico in 2005 and the only Mexican entity to attend a meeting organized by the United Nations in San Francisco, USA, on urban planning and sustainability of local governments, on the occasion of the 70th anniversary of the founding of that organization. At the same time, the current city entrances, the expansion of the bypass, and the planning of the new road infrastructures, underpasses, and the northern and southern bypasses were constructed.

The city's sewage treatment plant was built, which cleans 95% of the sewage in Nom H3. Another advance in his administration was the decentralization of all government offices from the Historic Center with the construction of the municipal administrative building, the state government offices of Guanajuato, and health services with the construction of the current General Hospital.

He left office to be nominated for the Senate and was elected for the 2006-2012 term in the LX Legislature of the Congress of the Union.

He was a plurinominal member of the Chamber of Deputies in the LXII Legislature of the Congress of the Union of Mexico and served as Coordinator of the PAN Parliamentary Group until August 13, 2014.
