= Ricardo Villarreal García =

Mexican politician and lawyer

- Born: 12 April 1981 (age 45); San Miguel de Allende, Guanajuato, Mexico
- Education: Escuela Libre de Derecho
- Occupations: Lawyer, politician
- Political party: PAN

Ricardo Villarreal García (born 12 April 1981) is a Mexican politician and lawyer member from the National Action Party (PAN).

Villarreal García was born in San Miguel de Allende, Guanajuato, in 1981. In the 2012 general election, he was elected to the Chamber of Deputies to represent Guanajuato's 2nd district during the 62nd session of Congress.

He was the municipal president of San Miguel de Allende from 2015 to 2018, time during which the City won the title of Best City in the World by Travel& Leisure Magazine. He was also president of the Association of Mexican World Heritage Cities in 2017 and Vice-president of the Organization of World Heritage Cities.

He served two further terms in Congress for Guanajuato's 2nd in 2018–2021 (64th Congress) and 2021–2024 (65th Congress).
