= Juan Pascualli Gómez =

Mexican politician (1950–2010)

Personal details
- Born: Juan de Jesús Pascualli Gómez; 28 June 1950; San Miguel de Allende, Guanajuato, Mexico
- Died: 29 April 2010 (aged 59); Mexico City, Mexico
- Political party: PAN
- Occupation: Politician

Juan de Jesús Pascualli Gómez (28 June 1950 – 29 April 2010) was a Mexican politician from the National Action Party (PAN).

From 2009 to 2010, he served in the Chamber of Deputies to represent Guanajuato's 2nd district during the 61st session of Congress.

He died in Mexico City on 29 April 2010 and was replaced for the remainder of his congressional term by his alternate, Laura Viviana Agundiz Pérez.
