= Viviana Agundiz =

Mexican politician (born 1968)

- Born: 20 February 1962 (age 64); Comonfort, Guanajuato, Mexico
- Occupation: Politician
- Political party: PAN

Laura Viviana Agundiz Pérez (born 6 August 1968) is a Mexican politician from the National Action Party (PAN). From 2010 to 2012, during the 61st session of Congress, she sat in the Chamber of Deputies representing Guanajuato's 2nd district as the alternate of Juan de Jesús Pascualli Gómez.
