= Armando Rangel Hernández =

Mexican politician (born 1965)

- Born: 20 October 1965 (age 60); Guanajuato, Mexico
- Occupation: Politician
- Political party: PAN

Armando Rangel Hernández (born 20 October 1965) is a Mexican politician affiliated with the National Action Party (PAN).

Rangel Hernández, a native of the state of Guanajuato, has been elected to the Chamber of Deputies for Guanajuato's 2nd district on two occasions: in the 1997 mid-terms (57th Congress), and in the 2003 mid-terms (59th Congress).

He was also the municipal president of San Luis de la Paz, Guanajuato, in 2000–2003.
