= San Miguel de Allende (municipality) =

Municipality of Guanajuato, Mexico

San Miguel de Allende is a municipality of Guanajuato, Mexico, and is also part of the Bajío region. Its seat of government is located in the city of San Miguel de Allende, which is also the most populous settlement of the municipality.

== Demographics ==
As the municipal seat, the town of San Miguel de Allende has been the center of local government for about 950 other communities, many of which have fewer than 50 people. As of 2005, the municipality had a total population of 139,297 with 62,034 living or about 44.5% living in the town proper. The largest communities outside of the municipal seat include Los Rodriguez (2,795 people), Corral de Piedras de Arriba (1,841 people) and Los Galvanes (1,402 people). Sometimes the municipality is called Allende to distinguish it from the town of San Miguel de Allende, but as both governments are located in the town, they are generally known as San Miguel de Allende.

== Geography ==
The municipality is located in the far eastern side of the state of Guanajuato. It has an average altitude of 1,870 metres (6,140 ft) above sea level. It borders the municipalities of San Luis de la Paz, Dolores Hidalgo, Salamanca, Juventino Rosas, Comonfort, Apaseo el Grande and San José Iturbide. It has a territory of 1,537.19 km^{2} (594 mi^{2}). The altitude varies from between 850 and 2,700 metres (2,790 and 8,860 ft) above sea level, with the town of San Miguel at 1,910 metres (6,270 ft). The municipality extends over two of the state's natural regions: the Sierras Volcanicas and the Cuencas Lacustres del Sur, with most of the territory over the latter. The entire municipality belongs to the national Trans-Mexican Volcanic Belt. Most of the territory inclines gently from between zero and five percent grade, with some exceptions where inclines can be as high as 25%. This restricts urban development and agriculture in the area. Prominent elevations include Cerro La Silleta, Cerro Prieto, Cerro La Piena, Cerro La Campana, El Cerro de El Picacho, Tambula, El Maguey, Palo Colorado, Mesa el Peñón, Loma Cuacuato, Mesa la Junta, Loma La Trinidad, Cerro El Común, La Loma, El Cuache and El Carmen. These peaks have an average altitude of 2,200 metres (7,200 ft).

The main river in the area is the Laja, which crosses from north to south before finally emptying in the Lerma River in the municipality of Salamanca. The river currently has serious pollution issues because it is used for discharge of wastewater without prior treatment. Most of this discharge is from the residential areas of San Miguel and Dolores Hidalgo. In addition to the river, there are four principal arroyos that pass by the municipal seat: the La Cañadita, El Atascadero, Las Cachinches and El Obraje. The last receives most of the area's runoff during the rainy season and feeds the Las Colonias and El Obraje dams. The most important dam in the area is the Ignacio Allende dam, located in the west of the municipality. While this dam controls flooding along the Laja River, local residents say that the water collected in its reservoir goes to the area around Guadalajara, far to the west of San Miguel, due to the provisions of the federal act creating the dam and reservoir. Other dams in the area include La Cantera and Bordo Grande located in the south and north of the municipality, respectively, along with the aforementioned Las Colonias and El Obraje, which are mostly used for irrigation. The municipality also has fresh water, thermal and alkaline springs, many of which are used as ecotourist attractions, such as the El Chorro, Montecillo, El Cortijo, Cieneguita, Atotonilco and Taboada spas. One other spa is the El Xoté, which has sulfur-laden waters.

The climate in the area is mostly temperate and semi-arid, with average temperatures varying between 16 and 22 °C (61 and 72 °F). Summers are moderately hot with a rainy season that generally producing sporadic thunderstorms. Winters are cool and moderate. One exception to this is the extreme west of the municipality where the climate is wetter. Ecosystems include shrublands, forests of oak, and areas where nopal cactus and grasses dominate.

== Landmarks ==
=== Atotonilco ===
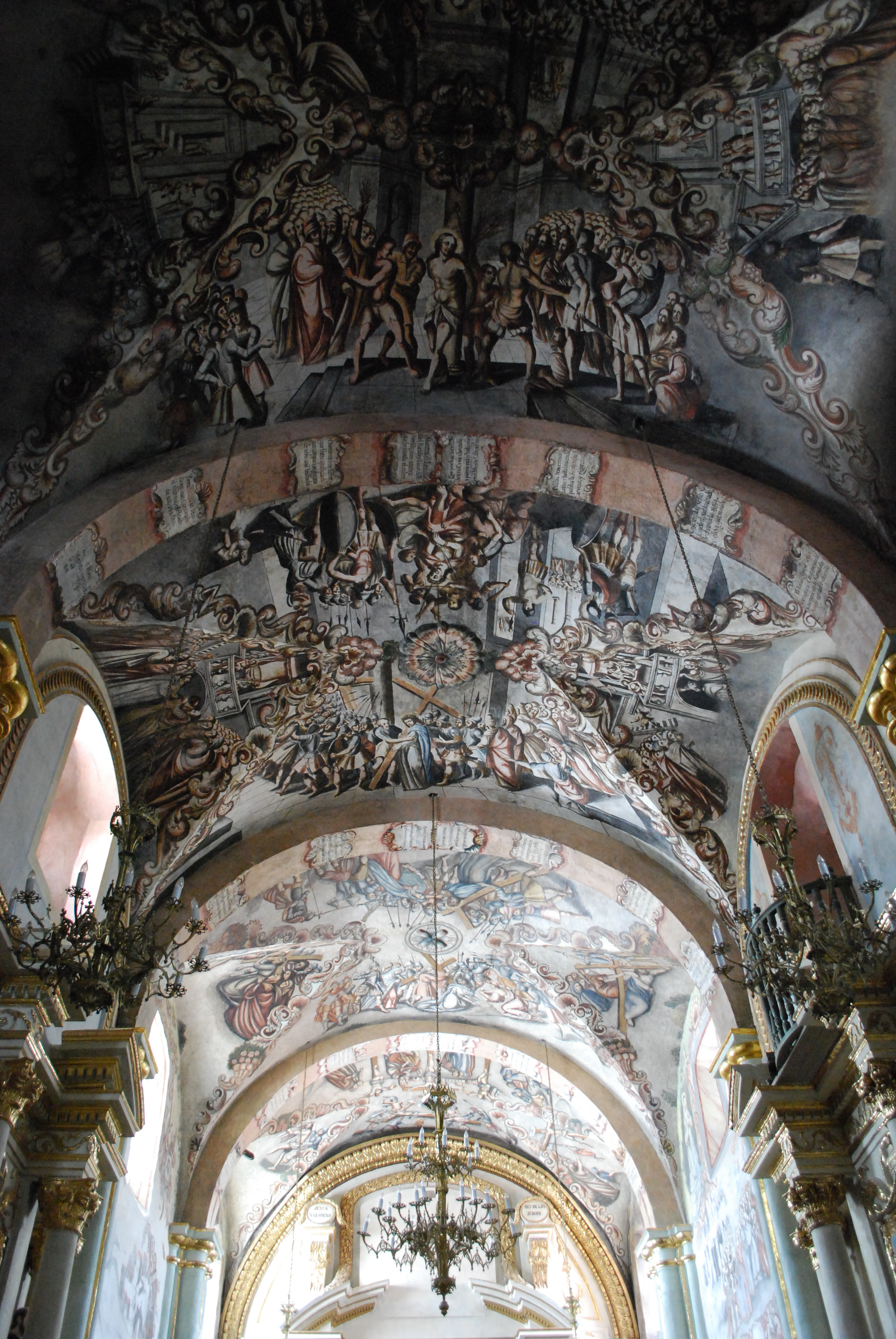
View of part of the ceiling inside the Sanctuary of Atotonilco

With only 597 people as of 2005, Atotonilco (formally Sanctuary of Atotonilco) is not the largest community in the municipality, but it is the best known due to its religious sanctuary, which has World Heritage Site status along with the historic center of San Miguel. The sanctuary is located 14 kilometres (8.7 mi) outside of the main town and dates from the 18th century. The church building itself has high plain walls on the outside, and consists of one large church with several smaller chapels. It is officially called the "Santuario de Dios y de la Patria" (Sanctuary of God and Country), but it is better known as the Sanctuary of Jesús Nazareno de Atotonilco. It is the church from which Miguel Hidalgo took the Virgin of Guadalupe standard for his army.

The Atotonilco sanctuary has plain high fortress-like walls. However, the inside walls and ceilings are completely covered in murals with a large number of personages and scenes from the Bible without much overall structure in how these images were placed. This mural work was done by Miguel Antonio Martínez de Pocasangre over thirty years. The style of the painting imitates Flemish painting, which was known through Belgian prints that the Spanish brought from Europe. The World Heritage Organization calls it an "exceptional example of the exchange between European and Latin American cultures" and "one of the finest examples of Baroque art and architecture in the [sic] New Spain". The structure and the mural work reflect the doctrine of Saint Ignatius of Loyola, and the church has been called the "Sistine Chapel of America". Atotonilco has been a pilgrimage site since the colonial period. The complex functions as a religious retreat for people from Mexico.

=== El Charco del Ingenio ===
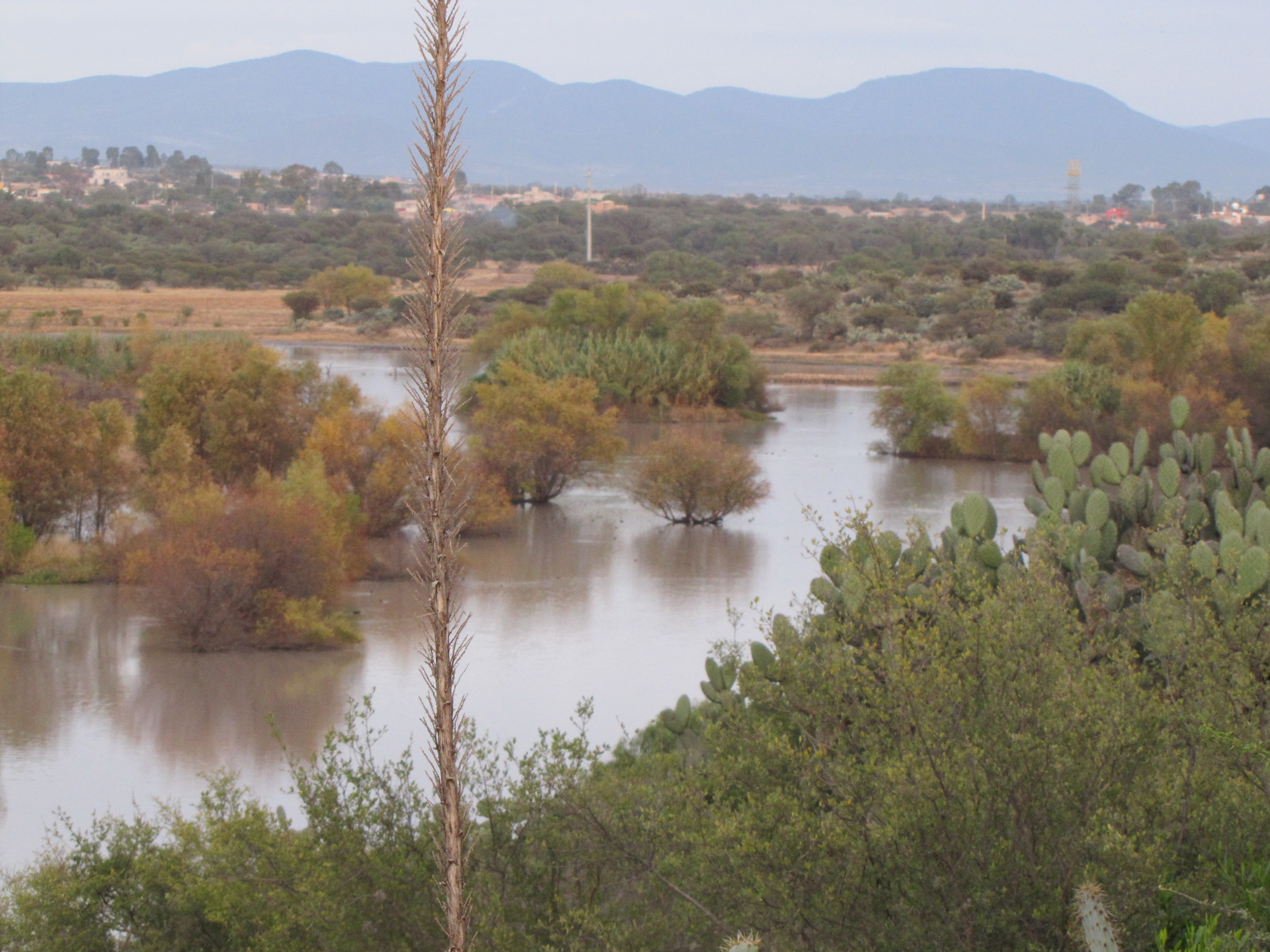
Wetland at the Presa Las Colonias, El Charco del Ingenio botanical garden

El Charco del Ingenio, located outside of the town, is an ecological reserve and botanical garden and is privately funded. It is dedicated to the restoration and preservation of Mexican flora and propagates mainly cactus species in danger of extinction. The reserve is centered on a canyon, at the bottom of which is a fresh spring that forms a natural pool. The canyon was the center of a number of myths and legends during the pre-Hispanic period. There are the remains of a colonial-era aqueduct and other waterworks on the property. This spring was so powerful it was the hydraulic power for an enormous water wheel and water supply to the city (thus, the name "Ingenio"). The water from this spring rose in the fountains throughout colonial San Miguel. An old dam that was part of this complex of hydraulic power became silted. A great flood ensued when the dam broke in 1999 during heavy rains. It is a stable wetland area now for the botanic gardens, with areas of the reserve crisscrossed with walking paths. There are opportunities for mountain biking, rock climbing, bird watching, camping and horseback riding.
