= 1st federal electoral district of Baja California =

Federal electoral district of Mexico

Baja California's 1st
- Electoral district of the Chamber of Deputies of Mexico

Incumbent
- Member: Laura Ruiz López
- Party: ▌Morena
- Congress: 66th (2024–2027)

District
- State: Baja California
- Head town: Mexicali
- Coordinates: 32°39′48″N 115°28′04″W
- Covers: Municipality of Mexicali (part)
- PR region: First
- Precincts: 203
- Population: 393,457 (2020 census)

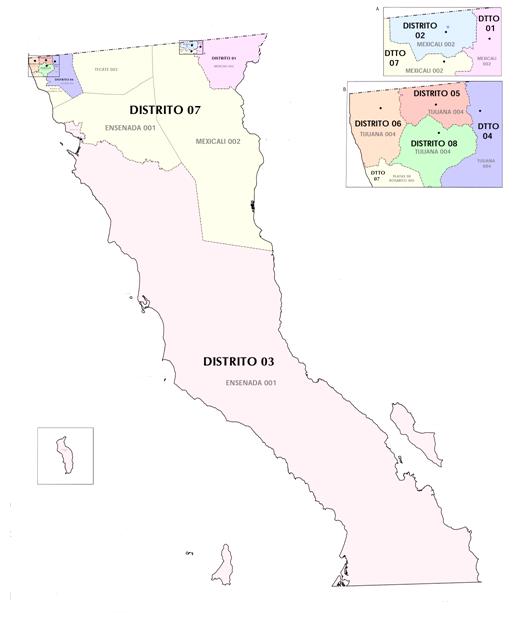
Baja California under the 2017–2022 districting scheme

Baja California's districts between 2005 and 2007

The 1st federal electoral district of Baja California (Spanish: Distrito electoral federal 01 de Baja California) is one of the 300 electoral districts into which Mexico is divided for elections to the federal Chamber of Deputies and one of nine such districts in the state of Baja California.

It elects one deputy to the lower house of Congress for each three-year legislative session by means of the first-past-the-post system. Votes cast in the district also count towards the calculation of proportional representation ("plurinominal") deputies elected from the first region.

The current member for the district, elected in the 2024 general election, is Alma Laura Ruiz López of the National Regeneration Movement (Morena).

== District territory ==
Under the 2023 districting plan adopted by the National Electoral Institute (INE), which is to be used for the 2024, 2027 and 2030 federal elections, the first district covers 203 precincts (secciones electorales) in the eastern urban portion of the municipality of Mexicali. (Note: The 2nd and 7th districts cover, respectively, the municipality's remaining urban and rural sectors.)

The head town (cabecera distrital), where results from individual polling stations are gathered together and tallied, is the state capital, the city of Mexicali. The district reported a population of 393,457 in the 2020 census.

== Previous districting schemes ==
Evolution of electoral district numbers
	1974	1978	1996	2005	2017	2023
Baja California	3	6	6	8	8	9
Chamber of Deputies	196	300				

2005–2017

Under the 2005 redistricting process, it was made up of the municipality of Mexicali, with the exception of its extreme northwest (where the state's 3rd district was located) and its extreme northeast (which corresponded to the 2nd district). The district's head town was the city of Mexicali.

1996–2005

Between 1996 and 2005, this electoral district covered the whole of the municipality of Mexicali, except for a small pocket in the east of the city of Mexicali, which was part of the 2nd district.

== Deputies returned to Congress ==
(Mexico) National parties
- Current
- PAN
- PRI
- PT
- PVEM
- MC
- Morena
- PAZ
- Somos
- Defunct or local only
- PLM
- PNR
- PRM
- PNM
- PP
- PPS
- PARM
- PFCRN
- CON
- PANAL
- PSD
- PES
- PES
- PRD

Baja California's 1st district
Election	Deputy	Party	Term	Legislature
1976	Ricardo Eguía Valderrama	Institutional Revolutionary Party	1976–1979	50th Congress
1979	José Luis Andrade Ibarra	Institutional Revolutionary Party	1979–1982	51st Congress
1982	José Ignacio Monge Rangel	Institutional Revolutionary Party	1982–1985	52nd Congress
1985	Luis I. López Moctezuma y Torres	Institutional Revolutionary Party	1985–1988	53rd Congress
1988	Jesús Armando Hernández Montaño	Institutional Revolutionary Party	1988–1991	54th Congress
1991	José Ramírez Román	Institutional Revolutionary Party	1991–1994	55th Congress
1994	Martina Montenegro Espinoza	Institutional Revolutionary Party	1994–1997	56th Congress
1997	Roberto Pérez de Alva	Institutional Revolutionary Party	1997–2000	57th Congress
2000	Juvenal Vidrio Rodríguez	National Action Party (Mexico)	2000–2003	58th Congress
2003	Hidalgo Contreras Covarrubias	National Action Party (Mexico)	2003–2006	59th Congress
2006	Francisco Rueda Gómez	National Action Party (Mexico)	2006–2009	60th Congress
2009	Sergio Tolento Hernández	National Action Party (Mexico)	2009–2012	61st Congress
2012	Benjamín Castillo Valdez	Institutional Revolutionary Party	2012–2015	62nd Congress
2015	Exaltación González Ceceña	National Action Party (Mexico)	2015–2018	63rd Congress
2018	Jesús Salvador Minor Mora	National Regeneration Movement	2018–2021	64th Congress
2021	Yesenia Olúa González	National Regeneration Movement	2021–2024	65th Congress
2024	Alma Laura Ruiz López	National Regeneration Movement	2024–2027	66th Congress

== Presidential elections ==
Baja California's 1st district
Election	District won by	Party or coalition	%
2018	Andrés Manuel López Obrador	Juntos Haremos Historia	61.0677
2024	Claudia Sheinbaum Pardo	Sigamos Haciendo Historia	54.9470
