= LVI Legislature of the Mexican Congress =

56th Congress (LVI Legislatura)
←	55th	57th	→
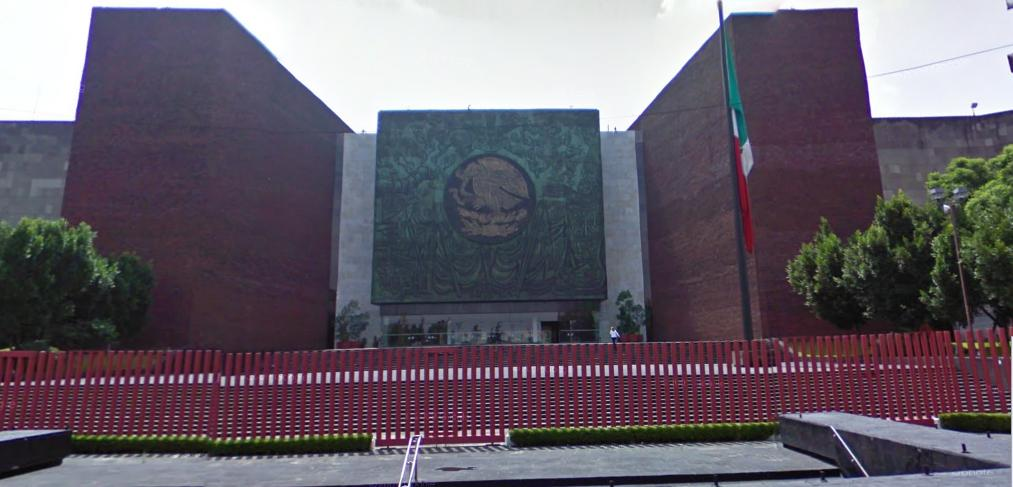
- Palacio Legislativo de San Lázaro

Overview
- Legislative body: Congress of the Union
- Meeting place: Palacio Legislativo de San Lázaro (Chamber of Deputies/Congress); Casona de Xicoténcatl (Senate)
- Term: 1 November 1994 – 31 August 1997
- Election: 21 August 1994

Senate of the Republic
- Members: 128

Chamber of Deputies
- Members: 500

Sessions
- 1st: 1 November 1994 – 23 December 1994
- 2nd: 15 March 1995 – 29 April 1995
- 3rd: 1 September 1995 – 15 December 1995
- 4th: 15 March 1996 – 30 April 1996
- 5th: 1 September 1996 – 13 December 1996
- 6th: 15 March 1997 – 30 April 1997

Special sessions
- 1st: 17 January 1995 – 28 January 1995
- 2nd: 6 March 1995 – 9 March 1995
- 3rd: 17 May 1995 – 25 May 1995
- 4th: 30 July 1996 – 2 August 1996

The LVI Legislature of the Congress of the Union of Mexico (56th Congress) met from 1994 to 1997.

== Members of the LVI Legislature ==
=== Deputies elected in single-member districts ===
State	District	Member	Party	State	District	Member	Party
Aguascalientes	1	María del Socorro Ramírez Ortega	Institutional Revolutionary Party	México	16	Agustín Mauro Jordán Arzate	Institutional Revolutionary Party
Aguascalientes	2	Héctor Hugo Olivares Ventura	Institutional Revolutionary Party	México	17	Raúl Lara Chanes	Institutional Revolutionary Party
Baja California	1	Martina Montenegro Espinoza	Institutional Revolutionary Party	México	18	Salvador Ávila Zúñiga	National Action Party (Mexico)
Baja California	2	Francisco Domínguez García	Institutional Revolutionary Party	México	19	Jorge Adolfo Cejudo Díaz	Institutional Revolutionary Party
Baja California	3	Daniel Quintero Peña	Institutional Revolutionary Party	México	20	Roberto Flores González	Institutional Revolutionary Party
Baja California	4	Héctor López Barraza	Institutional Revolutionary Party	México	21	Leonel Domínguez Rivero	Institutional Revolutionary Party
Baja California	5	Franciscana Krauss Velarde	Institutional Revolutionary Party	México	22	Alejandro Audry Sánchez	Institutional Revolutionary Party
Baja California	6	Jaime Martínez Veloz	Institutional Revolutionary Party	México	23	Virgilia Noguera Corona	Institutional Revolutionary Party
Baja California Sur	1	Amadeo Murillo Aguilar; Alternate of Leonel Cota Montaño	Institutional Revolutionary Party	México	24	Héctor San Román Arreaga	Institutional Revolutionary Party
Baja California Sur	2	Rodimiro Amaya Téllez	Institutional Revolutionary Party	México	25	Olga Bernal Arenas	Institutional Revolutionary Party
Campeche	1	Manuel Pacheco Arjona	Institutional Revolutionary Party	México	26	Luis Alberto Contreras Salazar	Institutional Revolutionary Party
Campeche	2	Gabriel Escalante Castillo	Institutional Revolutionary Party	México	27	Israel Ledezma Magaña	Institutional Revolutionary Party
Chiapas	1	Walter Antonio León Montoya	Institutional Revolutionary Party	México	28	José Luis Salcedo Solís	Institutional Revolutionary Party
Chiapas	2	Antonio Pérez Hernández	Institutional Revolutionary Party	México	29	Florencio Catalán Valdez	Institutional Revolutionary Party
Chiapas	3	Alí Cancino Herrera	Institutional Revolutionary Party	México	30	Josué Valdés Mondragón	Institutional Revolutionary Party
Chiapas	4	Tito Rubín Cruz	Institutional Revolutionary Party	México	31	Mario Vázquez Hernández	Institutional Revolutionary Party
Chiapas	5	Hildiberto Ochoa Samayoa	Institutional Revolutionary Party	México	32	Gaspar Ávila Rodríguez	Institutional Revolutionary Party
Chiapas	6	Rafael Ceballos Cancino	Institutional Revolutionary Party	México	33	Joaquín Rodríguez Lugo	Institutional Revolutionary Party
Chiapas	7	Gabriel Aguiar Ortega	Institutional Revolutionary Party	México	34	Antonio Hernández Reyes	Institutional Revolutionary Party
Chiapas	8	Germán Jiménez Gómez	Institutional Revolutionary Party	Michoacán	1	María Guadalupe Morales Ledesma	Institutional Revolutionary Party
Chiapas	9	Lázaro Hernández Vázquez	Institutional Revolutionary Party	Michoacán	2	Carmen Soto Correa	Institutional Revolutionary Party
Chihuahua	1	Manuel Russek Valles	Institutional Revolutionary Party	Michoacán	3	Froylán Velázquez Hernández	Party of the Democratic Revolution
Chihuahua	2	Alfredo Amaya Medina	Institutional Revolutionary Party	Michoacán	4	Jaime Rodríguez López	Institutional Revolutionary Party
Chihuahua	3	Sergio Vázquez Olivas	Institutional Revolutionary Party	Michoacán	5	Guillermo Alejandro Gómez Vega	Institutional Revolutionary Party
Chihuahua	4	Miguel Lucero Palma	Institutional Revolutionary Party	Michoacán	6	Agustín Martínez Maldonado	Institutional Revolutionary Party
Chihuahua	5	Saúl González Herrera	Institutional Revolutionary Party	Michoacán	7	Emilio Solórzano Solís	Institutional Revolutionary Party
Chihuahua	6	Óscar Villalobos Chávez	Institutional Revolutionary Party	Michoacán	8	Fernando Orihuela Carmona	Institutional Revolutionary Party
Chihuahua	7	Mario de la Torre Hernández	Institutional Revolutionary Party	Michoacán	9	Roldán Álvarez Ayala	Party of the Democratic Revolution
Chihuahua	8	Héctor González Mocken	Institutional Revolutionary Party	Michoacán	10	Victoria Eugenia Méndez Márquez	Institutional Revolutionary Party
Chihuahua	9	Sergio Prieto Gamboa	Institutional Revolutionary Party	Michoacán	11	Armando Octavio Ballinas Mayes	Institutional Revolutionary Party
Chihuahua	10	Jorge Castillo Cabrera	Institutional Revolutionary Party	Michoacán	12	Víctor Silva Tejeda	Institutional Revolutionary Party
Coahuila	1	Alejandro Gutiérrez Gutiérrez	Institutional Revolutionary Party	Michoacán	13	Desiderio Camacho Garibo	Party of the Democratic Revolution
Coahuila	2	Manlio Fabio Gómez Uranga	Institutional Revolutionary Party	Morelos	1	Jorge Armando Meade Ocaranza	Institutional Revolutionary Party
Coahuila	3	Miguel Ángel García García	Institutional Revolutionary Party	Morelos	2	Raúl Ramírez Chávez	Institutional Revolutionary Party
Coahuila	4	Marco Antonio Dávila Montesinos	Institutional Revolutionary Party	Morelos	3	Juan Salgado Brito	Institutional Revolutionary Party
Coahuila	5	Gerardo Ordaz Moreno	Institutional Revolutionary Party	Morelos	4	Gerardo Flores González	Institutional Revolutionary Party
Coahuila	6	Jesús Salvador Hernández Vélez	Institutional Revolutionary Party	Nayarit	1	Fidel Pineda Valdez	Institutional Revolutionary Party
Coahuila	7	José Luis Flores Méndez	Institutional Revolutionary Party	Nayarit	2	José Santos Ramos Damián	Institutional Revolutionary Party
Colima	1	Ramona Carbajal Cárdenas	Institutional Revolutionary Party	Nayarit	3	Liberato Montenegro Villa	Institutional Revolutionary Party
Colima	2	Cecilio Lepe Bautista	Institutional Revolutionary Party	Nuevo León	1	José Natividad González Parás	Institutional Revolutionary Party
Distrito Federal	1	Manuel Arciniega Portillo	National Action Party (Mexico)	Nuevo León	2	Fidel Pérez García	Institutional Revolutionary Party
Distrito Federal	2	José Luis Martínez Álvarez	Institutional Revolutionary Party	Nuevo León	3	Carlota Vargas Garza	Institutional Revolutionary Party
Distrito Federal	3	Rogelio Zamora Barradas	Institutional Revolutionary Party	Nuevo León	4	Gerardo Rodríguez Rivera	National Action Party (Mexico)
Distrito Federal	4	Juan José Osorio Palacios	Institutional Revolutionary Party	Nuevo León	5	Jesús Siller Rojas	Institutional Revolutionary Party
Distrito Federal	5	Francisco Martínez Rivera	Institutional Revolutionary Party	Nuevo León	6	César González Quiroga	Institutional Revolutionary Party
Distrito Federal	6	Claudia Esqueda Llanes	Institutional Revolutionary Party	Nuevo León	7	Dante Decanini Livas	Institutional Revolutionary Party
Distrito Federal	7	Jorge Efraín Moreno Collado	Institutional Revolutionary Party	Nuevo León	8	Antonio Medina Ojeda	Institutional Revolutionary Party
Distrito Federal	8	Jesús Rodríguez y Rodríguez	Institutional Revolutionary Party	Nuevo León	9	Cristina Díaz Salazar	Institutional Revolutionary Party
Distrito Federal	9	Irma Eugenia Cedillo y Amador	Institutional Revolutionary Party	Nuevo León	10	Víctor Cruz Ramírez	National Action Party (Mexico)
Distrito Federal	10	Jaime Jesús Arceo Castro	Institutional Revolutionary Party	Nuevo León	11	Néstor Molina Martínez	Institutional Revolutionary Party
Distrito Federal	11	Alejandro Rojas Díaz Durán	Institutional Revolutionary Party	Oaxaca	1	Abel Trejo González	Institutional Revolutionary Party
Distrito Federal	12	José Noe Moreno Carvajal	Institutional Revolutionary Party	Oaxaca	2	Blas Fortino Figueroa Montes	Institutional Revolutionary Party
Distrito Federal	13	Fernando Salgado Delgado	Institutional Revolutionary Party	Oaxaca	3	José Antonio Hernández Fraguas	Institutional Revolutionary Party
Distrito Federal	14	José Castelazo	Institutional Revolutionary Party	Oaxaca	4	Rolando Hernández Castillo	Institutional Revolutionary Party
Distrito Federal	15	Javier Pineda y Serino	Institutional Revolutionary Party	Oaxaca	5	Virginia Hernández Hernández	Institutional Revolutionary Party
Distrito Federal	16	Víctor Manuel Rubio	Institutional Revolutionary Party	Oaxaca	6	Baruc Efraín Alavez Mendonza	Institutional Revolutionary Party
Distrito Federal	17	Sebastián Lerdo de Tejada Covarrubias	Institutional Revolutionary Party	Oaxaca	7	Francisco Bolaños Bolaños	Party of the Democratic Revolution
Distrito Federal	18	Armando Gamboa Enríquez	Institutional Revolutionary Party	Oaxaca	8	Tomás Baños Baños	Institutional Revolutionary Party
Distrito Federal	19	Jaime Mariano del Río Navarro	Institutional Revolutionary Party	Oaxaca	9	Juan Manuel Cruz Acevedo	Institutional Revolutionary Party
Distrito Federal	20	Adolfo Ramón Flores Rodríguez	Institutional Revolutionary Party	Oaxaca	10	Ma. del Carmen Ricardez Vela	Institutional Revolutionary Party
Distrito Federal	21	Ofelia Casillas Ontiveros	Institutional Revolutionary Party	Puebla	1	Héctor González Reyes	Institutional Revolutionary Party
Distrito Federal	22	Víctor Manuel Álvarez Trasviña	Institutional Revolutionary Party	Puebla	2	Lucero Saldaña Pérez	Institutional Revolutionary Party
Distrito Federal	23	Óscar Levín Coppel	Institutional Revolutionary Party	Puebla	3	Víctor Hugo Islas	Institutional Revolutionary Party
Distrito Federal	24	María de la Luz Lima Malvido	Institutional Revolutionary Party	Puebla	4	José Luis Galeazzi Berra	National Action Party (Mexico)
Distrito Federal	25	Pascual Juárez Santiago	Institutional Revolutionary Party	Puebla	5	Fidencio Romero Tobón	Institutional Revolutionary Party
Distrito Federal	26	Marco Antonio Michel Díaz	Institutional Revolutionary Party	Puebla	6	Edgar Benítez Gálvez	Institutional Revolutionary Party
Distrito Federal	27	Rosario Guerra Díaz	Institutional Revolutionary Party	Puebla	7	Marina Blanco Casco	Institutional Revolutionary Party
Distrito Federal	28	Carlos Aceves del Olmo	Institutional Revolutionary Party	Puebla	8	Lidia Zarrazaga Molina	Institutional Revolutionary Party
Distrito Federal	29	Alfonso Reyes Medrano	Institutional Revolutionary Party	Puebla	9	Matilde del Mar Hidalgo y García Barna	Institutional Revolutionary Party
Distrito Federal	30	José Eduardo Escobedo Miramontes	Institutional Revolutionary Party	Puebla	10	Cándido Pérez Verduzco	Institutional Revolutionary Party
Distrito Federal	31	Ignacio Contreras Flores	Institutional Revolutionary Party	Puebla	11	Ricardo Menéndez Haces	Institutional Revolutionary Party
Distrito Federal	32	Roberto Campa Cifrián	Institutional Revolutionary Party	Puebla	12	Luis Antonio Godina Herrera	Institutional Revolutionary Party
Distrito Federal	33	José Sánchez Juárez	Institutional Revolutionary Party	Puebla	13	Pedro Pablo Aceves Hernández	Institutional Revolutionary Party
Distrito Federal	34	Carlos Reta Martínez	Institutional Revolutionary Party	Puebla	14	Cecilia Hernández Ríos	Institutional Revolutionary Party
Distrito Federal	35	Carlos Flores Vizcarra	Institutional Revolutionary Party	Querétaro	1	José Manuel García García	Institutional Revolutionary Party
Distrito Federal	36	Armando Salinas Torre	National Action Party (Mexico)	Querétaro	2	Ezequiel Espinosa Mejía	Institutional Revolutionary Party
Distrito Federal	37	Horacio Pereznegró	Institutional Revolutionary Party	Querétaro	3	Ernesto Luque Feregrino	Institutional Revolutionary Party
Distrito Federal	38	Ana María Licona Spínola	Institutional Revolutionary Party	Quintana Roo	1	Sara Muza Simón	Institutional Revolutionary Party
Distrito Federal	39	Alejandro Díaz y Pérez	National Action Party (Mexico)	Quintana Roo	2	Virginia Betanzos Moreno	Institutional Revolutionary Party
Distrito Federal	40	Florentino Castro López	Institutional Revolutionary Party	San Luis Potosí	1	Jesús Eduardo Noyola Bernal	Institutional Revolutionary Party
Durango	1	Ismael Hernández Deras	Institutional Revolutionary Party	San Luis Potosí	2	María Elena Yrizar Arias; Alternate of Alejandro Zapata Perogordo	National Action Party (Mexico)
Durango	2	Sabino González Alba	Institutional Revolutionary Party	San Luis Potosí	3	Lucas Gómez Hernández	Institutional Revolutionary Party
Durango	3	José Rosas Aispuro	Institutional Revolutionary Party	San Luis Potosí	4	Antonio Rivera Barrón	Institutional Revolutionary Party
Durango	4	Ricardo Pacheco Rodríguez	Institutional Revolutionary Party	San Luis Potosí	5	Fructuoso López Cárdenas	Institutional Revolutionary Party
Durango	5	José Roberto Arreola Arreola	Institutional Revolutionary Party	San Luis Potosí	6	Yolanda González Hernández	Institutional Revolutionary Party
Durango	6	José Luis González Achem	Institutional Revolutionary Party	San Luis Potosí	7	Miguel Ortiz Jonguitud	Institutional Revolutionary Party
Guanajuato	1	Severiano Pérez Vázquez	Institutional Revolutionary Party	Sinaloa	1	Alfredo Valdez Gaxiola	Institutional Revolutionary Party
Guanajuato	2	Primo Quiroz Durán	Institutional Revolutionary Party	Sinaloa	2	José Luis Leyson Castro	Institutional Revolutionary Party
Guanajuato	3	Ricardo Padilla Martín	Institutional Revolutionary Party	Sinaloa	3	Jorge Kondo López	Institutional Revolutionary Party
Guanajuato	4	Humberto Meza Galván	Institutional Revolutionary Party	Sinaloa	4	Jesús Manuel Meléndez Franco	Institutional Revolutionary Party
Guanajuato	5	Pascual Ramírez Córdova	Institutional Revolutionary Party	Sinaloa	5	Jorge Abel López Sánchez	Institutional Revolutionary Party
Guanajuato	6	Fernando Pacheco Martínez	Institutional Revolutionary Party	Sinaloa	6	Pablo Moreno Cota	Institutional Revolutionary Party
Guanajuato	7	Luis Manuel Jiménez Lemus	Institutional Revolutionary Party	Sinaloa	7	Heriberto Galindo Quiñones	Institutional Revolutionary Party
Guanajuato	8	Josefina Balleza Sánchez	Institutional Revolutionary Party	Sinaloa	8	José Feliciano García Peraza	Institutional Revolutionary Party
Guanajuato	9	Jaime Martínez Tapia	Institutional Revolutionary Party	Sinaloa	9	Jesús Refael Ruvalcaba León	Institutional Revolutionary Party
Guanajuato	10	Alejandro Torres Aguilar	Institutional Revolutionary Party	Sonora	1	Daniel Trélles Iruretagoyena	Institutional Revolutionary Party
Guanajuato	11	Humberto Andrade Quezada	National Action Party (Mexico)	Sonora	2	Luz Salazar Pérez	National Action Party (Mexico)
Guanajuato	12	Lorenzo Chávez Zavala	Institutional Revolutionary Party	Sonora	3	Heriberto Lizárraga Zatarain	Institutional Revolutionary Party
Guanajuato	13	Martín Montaño Arteaga	Institutional Revolutionary Party	Sonora	4	Francisco Javier Hernández Armenta	Institutional Revolutionary Party
Guerrero	1	Efrén Nicolás Leyva Acevedo	Institutional Revolutionary Party	Sonora	5	Leobardo Aguirre Corral	Institutional Revolutionary Party
Guerrero	2	Píndaro Urióstegui Miranda	Institutional Revolutionary Party	Sonora	6	Alfonso Molina Ruibal	Institutional Revolutionary Party
Guerrero	3	Netzahualcóyotl de la Vega	Institutional Revolutionary Party	Sonora	7	Juan Leyva Mendívil	Institutional Revolutionary Party
Guerrero	4	Antonio Piza Soberanis	Institutional Revolutionary Party	Tabasco	1	César Raúl Ojeda Zubieta	Institutional Revolutionary Party
Guerrero	5	Fernando Cruz Merino	Institutional Revolutionary Party	Tabasco	2	José de la Cruz Martínez López	Institutional Revolutionary Party
Guerrero	6	Marcelino Miranda Añorve	Institutional Revolutionary Party	Tabasco	3	Carlos Mario de la Fuente Lazo	Institutional Revolutionary Party
Guerrero	7	René Juárez Cisneros	Institutional Revolutionary Party	Tabasco	4	Francisco Peralta Burelo	Institutional Revolutionary Party
Guerrero	8	Antelmo Alvarado García	Institutional Revolutionary Party	Tabasco	5	Óscar Cantón Zetina	Institutional Revolutionary Party
Guerrero	9	Gabino Fernández Serna	Institutional Revolutionary Party	Tamaulipas	1	Daniel Covarrubias Ramos	Institutional Revolutionary Party
Guerrero	10	Abel Velasco Velasco	Institutional Revolutionary Party	Tamaulipas	2	Eliezar García Sáenz	Institutional Revolutionary Party
Hidalgo	1	Mario Alberto Viornery Mendoza	Institutional Revolutionary Party	Tamaulipas	3	Homar Zamorano Ayala	Institutional Revolutionary Party
Hidalgo	2	Aurelio Marín Huazo	Institutional Revolutionary Party	Tamaulipas	4	José Antonio Martínez Torres	Institutional Revolutionary Party
Hidalgo	3	Guillermo Álvarez Cuevas	Institutional Revolutionary Party	Tamaulipas	5	Antonio Sánchez Gochicoa	Institutional Revolutionary Party
Hidalgo	4	Roberto Pedraza Martínez	Institutional Revolutionary Party	Tamaulipas	6	Jesús Olvera Méndez	Institutional Revolutionary Party
Hidalgo	5	Miguel Ángel Islas Chío	Institutional Revolutionary Party	Tamaulipas	7	Jesús Guillermo Acebo Salman	Institutional Revolutionary Party
Hidalgo	6	Prisciliano Gutiérrez Hernández	Institutional Revolutionary Party	Tamaulipas	8	Guadalupe Flores Valdez	Institutional Revolutionary Party
Jalisco	1	Juan Manuel Pérez Corona	National Action Party (Mexico)	Tamaulipas	9	Leticia Camero Gómez	Institutional Revolutionary Party
Jalisco	2	Miguel Acosta Ruelas	National Action Party (Mexico)	Tlaxcala	1	Joaquín Cisneros Fernández	Institutional Revolutionary Party
Jalisco	3	José de Jesús Sánchez Ochoa	National Action Party (Mexico)	Tlaxcala	2	Alfonso Sánchez Anaya	Institutional Revolutionary Party
Jalisco	4	Filemón Ramírez Pérez	Institutional Revolutionary Party	Veracruz	1	Joaquín Juárez del Ángel	Institutional Revolutionary Party
Jalisco	5	José Luis Mata Bracamontes	Institutional Revolutionary Party	Veracruz	2	Genaro Alfonso del Ángel Amador	Institutional Revolutionary Party
Jalisco	6	Emma Muñoz Covarrubias	Institutional Revolutionary Party	Veracruz	3	Zaida Lladó Castillo	Institutional Revolutionary Party
Jalisco	7	Horacio Alejandro Gutiérrez Bravo	National Action Party (Mexico)	Veracruz	4	José Pedro Sánchez Ascencio	National Action Party (Mexico)
Jalisco	8	Sofía Valencia Abundis	Institutional Revolutionary Party	Veracruz	5	Guillermo Zúñiga Martínez	Institutional Revolutionary Party
Jalisco	9	Mario Alejandro Rosales Anaya	Institutional Revolutionary Party	Veracruz	6	Ignacio González Rebolledo	Institutional Revolutionary Party
Jalisco	10	Heriberto Santana Rubio	Institutional Revolutionary Party	Veracruz	7	Servando Andrés Díaz Suárez	Institutional Revolutionary Party
Jalisco	11	Ismael Orozco Loreto	Institutional Revolutionary Party	Veracruz	8	Felipe Amadeo Flores Espinoza	Institutional Revolutionary Party
Jalisco	12	Rodolfo González Macías	Institutional Revolutionary Party	Veracruz	9	Marcelo Ramírez Ramírez	Institutional Revolutionary Party
Jalisco	13	José de Jesús Preciado Bermejo	National Action Party (Mexico)	Veracruz	10	Enrique Ramos Rodríguez	Institutional Revolutionary Party
Jalisco	14	Alejandro Villaseñor Tatay	National Action Party (Mexico)	Veracruz	11	Salvador Mikel Rivera	Institutional Revolutionary Party
Jalisco	15	José Enrique Patiño Terán	National Action Party (Mexico)	Veracruz	12	Manuel Pérez Bonilla	Institutional Revolutionary Party
Jalisco	16	José Íñiguez Cervantes	National Action Party (Mexico)	Veracruz	13	Pedro Guillermo Rivera Pavón	Institutional Revolutionary Party
Jalisco	17	Javier Guízar Macías	Institutional Revolutionary Party	Veracruz	14	Jorge Wade González	Institutional Revolutionary Party
Jalisco	18	Hugo Fernando Rodríguez Martínez	Institutional Revolutionary Party	Veracruz	15	Amado Cruz Malpica	Party of the Democratic Revolution
Jalisco	19	Enrique Romero Montaño	Institutional Revolutionary Party	Veracruz	16	Carlos Verteramo Pérez	Institutional Revolutionary Party
Jalisco	20	Francisco Ledezma Durán	National Action Party (Mexico)	Veracruz	17	Alicia González Cerecedo	Institutional Revolutionary Party
México	1	Sergio Ramírez Vargas	Institutional Revolutionary Party	Veracruz	18	Roberto Álvarez Salgado	Institutional Revolutionary Party
México	2	Wilfrido Muñoz Rivera	Institutional Revolutionary Party	Veracruz	19	Primo Rivera Torres	Institutional Revolutionary Party
México	3	Lauro Rendón Castrejón	Institutional Revolutionary Party	Veracruz	20	Erasmo Delgado Guerra	Institutional Revolutionary Party
México	4	Manuel Hinojosa Juárez	Institutional Revolutionary Party	Veracruz	21	Fernando Flores Gómez	Institutional Revolutionary Party
México	5	Regina Reyes Retana	Institutional Revolutionary Party	Veracruz	22	Elías Moreno Brizuela	Party of the Democratic Revolution
México	6	Juan Manuel Tovar Estrada	Institutional Revolutionary Party	Veracruz	23	Gladys Merlín Castro	Institutional Revolutionary Party
México	7	Ma. del Carmen Zavala Medel	Institutional Revolutionary Party	Yucatán	1	Manuel Fuentes Alcocer	National Action Party (Mexico)
México	8	Irene Maricela Cerón Nequis	Institutional Revolutionary Party	Yucatán	2	Rubén Calderón Cecilio	Institutional Revolutionary Party
México	9	Aurelio Salinas Ortiz	Institutional Revolutionary Party	Yucatán	3	Eric Rubio Barthell	Institutional Revolutionary Party
México	10	María Elisa Garzón Franco	Institutional Revolutionary Party	Yucatán	4	Tuffy Gaber Arjona	Institutional Revolutionary Party
México	11	Jorge Cortés Vences	Institutional Revolutionary Party	Zacatecas	1	Yrene Ramos Dávila	Institutional Revolutionary Party
México	12	José Francisco Lozada Chávez	Institutional Revolutionary Party	Zacatecas	2	Eustaquio de León Contreras	Institutional Revolutionary Party
México	13	Ramiro Calvillo Ramos	Institutional Revolutionary Party	Zacatecas	3	Gustavo Salinas Íñiguez	Institutional Revolutionary Party
México	14	Rubén Jiménez Leal	Institutional Revolutionary Party	Zacatecas	4	Carlos Pérez Rico	Institutional Revolutionary Party
México	15	Francisco Maldonado Ruiz	Institutional Revolutionary Party	Zacatecas	5	Pedro López y Macías	Institutional Revolutionary Party

=== Plurinominal deputies ===
Region	Member	Party	Region	Member	Party
First	José Luis Torres Ortega; Alternate of Antonio Lozano Gracia		Third	Rosario Ibarra de Piedra	
First	Cecilia Romero Castillo		Third	Octavio Romero Oropeza	
First	María Elena Álvarez Bernal		Third	Gloria Sánchez Hernández	
First	Manuel Beristain Gómez		Third	Javier González Garza	
First	Jorge Ocejo Moreno		Third	Pedro Etienne Llano	
First	Gustavo Gabriel Llamas Monjardin		Third	Martín Gerardo Longoria Hernández	
First	Jorge Arturo Quiroz Presa		Third	Manuel Chable Gutiérrez	
First	Carmen Segura Rangel		Third	Julieta Uribe Caldera	
First	Miguel Hernández Labastida		Third	Saúl Alfonso Escobar Toledo	
First	Apolonio Méndez Meneses		Third	Antonio Hernández Cruz	
First	María Teresa Gómez-Mont Urueta		Third	Manuel Alberto Coronel Zenteno	
First	Kurt Antonio Thomsen D'abbadie		Third	César Antonio Chávez Castillo	
Primera	David Vargas Santos		Third	Eric Eber Villanueva Mukul	
First	Fernando Pérez Noriega		Third	Raúl Alejandro Livas Vera	
First	Francisco José Peniche y Bolio		Third	Osbelia Arellano López	
First	Patricia Garduño Morales		Third	Rosa María Cabrera Lotfe	
First	Hiram Escudero Álvares		Third	Alberto Anaya	
First	Tarcisio Navarrete		Third	Ezequiel Flores Rodríguez	
First	Jorge Ricardo Nieto Guzmán		Fourth	Ricardo García Cervantes	
First	Francisco Suárez Dávila		Fourth	Manuel Baeza González	
First	Julio Felipe García Castañeda		Fourth	Rodrigo Robledo Silva	
First	José Ignacio Cuauhtémoc Paleta		Fourth	Alejandro Higuera Osuna	
First	Ignacio Ovalle Fernández		Fourth	Lauro Norzagaray Norzagaray	
First	Octavio Guillermo West Silva		Fourth	Alejandro González Alcocer	
First	Ifigenia Martínez		Fourth	Jorge Antonio Catalán Sosa	
First	José Mauro González Luna		Fourth	Jorge González González	
First	Eliseo Moyao Morales		Fourth	Ramón Cárdenas Gudiño	
First	Arnoldo Martínez Verdugo		Fourth	Jesús Ramón Rojo Gutiérrez	
First	Ramón Sosamontes		Fourth	Luis Ruan Ruis	
First	Ysabel Molina Warner; Alternate of Manuel Marcué Pardiñas		Fourth	Nohelia Linares González	
First	Marco Rascón		Fourth	Rafael Ayala López	
First	Antonio Tenorio Adame		Fourth	Jorge Urdapilleta Núñez	
First	María Rosa Márquez Cabrera		Fourth	Rafael Núñez Pellegrin	
First	René Arce Islas		Fourth	Ma. Remedios Olivera Orozco	
First	Salvador Martínez della Rocca		Fourth	Javier Alberto Gutiérrez Vida	
First	Luis Sánchez Aguilar		Fourth	Zenen Xochihua Valdés	
First	Graciela Rojas Cruz		Fourth	Giuseppe Macías Beilis	
First	Óscar González Yáñez		Fourth	Florencio Martínez Hernández Balderas	
First	Primitivo Ríos Vázquez		Fourth	José Francisco Limón Tapia	
Second	Eusebio Moreno Muñoz		Fourth	Salvador Becerra Rodríguez	
Second	Guillermo Luján Peña		Fourth	Carlos Alfonso Nuño Luna	
Second	Rodolfo Elizondo Torres		Fourth	Salvador López Orduña	
Second	Salvador Beltrán del Río		Fourth	Miguel Rodríguez Ramírez	
Second	Alejandro Zapata Perogordo		Fourth	Luis Garfias	
Second	José Gerardo de los Cobos Silva		Fourth	Alfonso Garzón Santibáñez	
Second	Manuel Espino Barrientos		Fourth	José Luis González Aguilera	
Second	Hugo Meneses Carrasco		Fourth	Ignacio Castillo Flores	
Second	Luis Alberto Rico Samaniego		Fourth	José Alfonso Solórzano Fraga	
Second	Jesús Carlos Hernández Martínez		Fourth	Crisóforo Salido Almada	
Second	Juan Antonio García Villa		Fourth	Roberto Robles Garnica	
Second	Audomaro Alba Padilla		Fourth	Francisco Curi Pérez Fernández	
Second	Jorge Enrique Dávila Juárez		Fourth	Juan N. Guerra	
Second	Andrés Galván Rivas		Fourth	Mara Nadiezhda Robles Villaseñor	
Second	Gerardo Gabriel Nava Bolaños		Fourth	Jesús Zambrano Grijalva	
Second	Cruz Pérez Cuéllar		Fourth	Taide Aburto Torres	
Second	Miguel Alberto Segura Dorantes		Fourth	Tonatiuh Bravo Padilla	
Second	Jorge Humberto Gómez García		Fourth	Leonel Godoy Rangel	
Second	Javier Ortega Espinoza		Fourth	Edgard Sánchez Ramírez	
Second	Matías Salvador Fernández Gavaldón		Fourth	Carlos Núñez Hurtado	
Second	Alfonso Martínez Guerra		Fourth	César Humberto González Magallón	
Second	Humberto Roque Villanueva		Fourth	Alejandro Moreno Berry	
Second	José Ramírez Gamero		Fifth	Eugenio Ortiz Walls	
Second	José de Jesús Padilla Padilla		Fifth	Francisco Javier Santos Covarrubias	
Second	Augusto Gómez Villanueva		Fifth	María Teresa Tapia Bahena; Alternate of Marcos Efrén Parra Gómez	
Second	Jacinto Gómez Pasillas		Fifth	Gerardo de Jesús Arellano Aguilar	
Second	Carlos Chaurand Arzate		Fifth	Max Tejeda Martínez	
Second	Jesús Ortega Martínez		Fifth	Pedro Flores Olvera	
Second	Leticia Calzada Gómez		Fifth	Agustín Torres Delgado	
Second	Rosario Robles Berlanga		Fifth	Régulo Pastor Fernández Rivera	
Second	Carlos Navarrete Ruiz		Fifth	Jorge Hernández Domínguez	
Second	Rafael Jacobo García		Fifth	Javier de Jesús Gutiérrez Robles	
Second	Francisco Patiño Cardona		Fifth	Abel García Ramírez	
Second	Víctor Quintana Silveyra		Fifth	Luis Andrés Esteva Melchor	
Second	Marcos Carlos Cruz Martínez		Fifth	Jesús Antonio Tallabs Ortega	
Second	José Narro Céspedes		Fifth	Gonzalo Alarcón Bárcena	
Third	Lorenzo Duarte y Zapata		Fifth	Eduardo Amardor Cárdenas Lebrija	
Third	Eduardo Arias Aparicio		Fifth	María Teresa Cortez Cervantes	
Third	Luis Felipe Mena Salas		Fifth	Mónica Gabriela Leñero Álvarez; Alternate of José Francisco Ruiz Massieu	
Third	Raúl Ríos Magaña		Fifth	Jesús Esquinca Gurusquieta	
Third	Fernando Garzacabello García		Fifth	Oscar Cárdenas Monroy	
Third	Fernando Jesús Rivadeneira y Rivas		Fifth	Samuel Palma César	
Third	José Luis Aguilar Martínez		Fifth	Miguel Humberto Manzo Godínez	
Third	Claudio Manuel Coello Herrera		Fifth	Guillermo González y Guardado	
Third	Augusto César Leal Angulo		Fifth	Graco Ramírez	
Third	Arnulfo Cueva Aguirre		Fifth	Martha Alvarado Castañón	
Third	Julián García Noriega		Fifth	Raúl Gonzalo Castellanos Hernández	
Third	Jorge Humberto Padilla Olvera		Fifth	Héctor Miguel Bautista López	
Third	Consuelo Botello Treviño		Fifth	Zeferino Torreblanca	
Third	Sergio Teodoro Meza López		Fifth	Adolfo Aguilar Zínser	
Third	Cristián Castaño Contreras		Fifth	Cuauhtémoc Sandoval Ramírez	
Third	Víctor Manuel Palacios Sosa		Fifth	Leticia Burgos Ochoa	
Third	José Jesús Durán Ruiz		Fifth	Adriana Luna Parra	
Third	José Alberto Castañeda Pérez		Fifth	Carlota Ángela Rosa Botey y Estape	
Third	Alicia Céspedes Arcos		Fifth	Ana Lilia Cepeda de León	
Third	Dionisio Pérez Jácome		Fifth	Armando Quintero Martínez	
Third	Dulce María Sauri Riancho		Fifth	Everardo Martínez Sánchez	
Third	Abelardo Carrillo Zavala		Fifth	Anselmo García Cruz	
Third	Calixto Javier Rivera Díaz		Fifth	Martín Equihua Equihua	
Third	Luis Priego Ortiz		Fifth	Joaquín Alberto Vela González	
Third	Carlos Servando Ponce de León Coluby		Fifth	Serafín Nuñez Ramos	

== Sources ==
- Chamber of Deputies
- "Legislatura 56" (PDF). Cámara de Diputados.

Preceded by LV Legislature	LVI Legislature; 1994 to 1997	Succeeded by LVII Legislature
