= 30th federal electoral district of the Federal District =

Defunct federal electoral district of Mexico

Coordinates: 19°12′N 99°10′W

The 30th federal electoral district of the Federal District (Spanish: Distrito electoral federal 30 del Distrito Federal) is a defunct federal electoral district of Mexico. Occupying a portion of what is today Mexico City, it was in existence from 1979 to 2005.

During that time, it returned one deputy to the Chamber of Deputies for each three-year legislative session by means of the first-past-the-post system, electing its first in the 1979 mid-term election and its last in the 2003 mid-terms. Votes cast in the district also counted towards the calculation of proportional representation ("plurinominal") deputies elected from the country's electoral regions.

The 28th, 29th and 30th districts were abolished by the Federal Electoral Institute (IFE) in its 2005 redistricting process because the capital's population no longer warranted that number of seats in Congress. They were not contested in the 2006 general election.

== District territory ==
Evolution of electoral district numbers
	1974	1978	1996	2005	2017	2023
Mexico City (Federal District)	27	40	30	27	24	22
Chamber of Deputies	196	300				

1996–2005

In its final form, when the capital comprised 30 districts, the 30th was located in the south of the city, covering the southern and more rural parts of the borough of Tlalpan.

1978–1996

The districting scheme in force from 1978 to 1996 was the result of the 1977 electoral reforms, which increased the number of single-member seats in the Chamber of Deputies from 196 to 300. Under that plan, the Federal District's seat allocation rose from 27 to 40. The 30th district covered a portion of the borough of Gustavo A. Madero in the north of the city.

== Deputies returned to Congress ==
(Mexico) National parties
- Current
- PAN
- PRI
- PT
- PVEM
- MC
- Morena
- Defunct or local only
- PLM
- PNR
- PRM
- PNM
- PP
- PPS
- PARM
- PFCRN
- Convergencia
- PANAL
- PSD
- PES
- PES
- PRD

Federal District's 30th district
Election	Deputy	Party	Term	Legislature
1979	Roberto Blanco Moheno	Institutional Revolutionary Party	1979–1982	51st Congress
1982	José Esteban Núñez Perea	Institutional Revolutionary Party	1982–1985	52nd Congress
1985	María Emilia Farías Mackey	Institutional Revolutionary Party	1985–1988	53rd Congress
1988	Mario Vargas Saldaña	Institutional Revolutionary Party	1988–1991	54th Congress
1991	Benjamín González Roaro	Institutional Revolutionary Party	1991–1994	55th Congress
1994	José Eduardo Escobedo Miramontes	Institutional Revolutionary Party	1994–1997	56th Congress
1997	David Cervantes Peredo	Party of the Democratic Revolution	1997–2000	57th Congress
2000	Jorge Alberto Lara Rivera	National Action Party (Mexico)	2000–2003	58th Congress
2003	Salvador Martínez della Rocca	Party of the Democratic Revolution	2003–2006	59th Congress
