= 24th federal electoral district of Mexico City =

Defunct federal electoral district of Mexico

Coordinates: 19°21′00″N 99°09′44″W

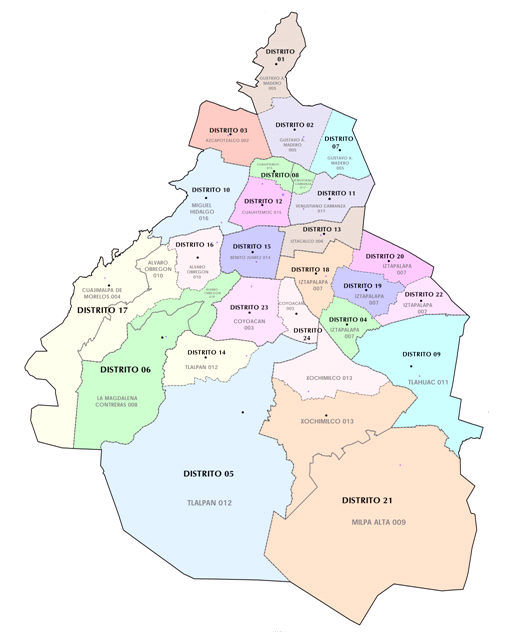
Mexico City under the 2017–2022 districting plan

The 24th federal electoral district of Mexico City (Distrito electoral federal 24 de la Ciudad de México; previously "of the Federal District") is a defunct federal electoral district of Mexico. It was in existence from 1961 to 2022.

During that time, it returned one deputy to the Chamber of Deputies for each three-year legislative session by means of the first-past-the-post system, electing its first in the 1961 mid-term election and its last in the 2021 mid-terms. From 1979 onwards, votes cast in the district also counted towards the calculation of proportional representation ("plurinominal") deputies elected from the country's electoral regions.

The 23rd and 24th districts were abolished by the National Electoral Institute (INE) in its 2023 redistricting process because, according to the results of the 2020 census, the capital's population no longer warranted that number of seats in Congress.

== District territory ==
Evolution of electoral district numbers
	1974	1978	1996	2005	2017	2023
Mexico City (Federal District)	27	40	30	27	24	22
Chamber of Deputies	196	300				

2017–2022

Mexico City lost three electoral districts in the 2017 redistricting process, leaving it with 24. In its final form, the 24th district covered the eastern portion of the Mexico City borough of Coyoacán and the northern sector of the borough of Xochimilco.

2005–2017

Under the 2005 plan, the Federal District lost three districts. The 24th district comprised 202 electoral precincts (secciones electorales) in the borough of Coyoacán. It covered those portions located to the north of Avenida Miguel Ángel de Quevedo and to the south of the Circuito Interior, and those located east of the Calzada de Tlalpan.

1996–2005

The Federal District lost ten districts in the 1996 redistricting process. Between 1996 and 2005, the reconfigured district covered the eastern portion of the borough of Coyoacán.

1978–1996

The districting scheme in force from 1978 to 1996 was the result of the 1977 electoral reforms, which increased the number of single-member seats in the Chamber of Deputies from 196 to 300. Under that plan, the Federal District's seat allocation rose from 27 to 40. The 24th district covered the whole of Xochimilco and the northern portion of Tlalpan.

== Deputies returned to Congress ==
(Mexico) National parties
- Current
- PAN
- PRI
- PT
- PVEM
- MC
- Morena
- PAZ
- Somos
- Defunct or local only
- PLM
- PNR
- PRM
- PNM
- PP
- PPS
- PARM
- PFCRN
- CON
- PANAL
- PSD
- PES
- PES
- PRD

Mexico City's 24th district
Election	Deputy	Party	Term	Legislature
1961	Humberto Santiago López	Institutional Revolutionary Party	1961–1964	45th Congress
1964	Bonifacio Moreno Tenorio	Institutional Revolutionary Party	1964–1967	46th Congress
1967	María Elena Jiménez Lozano	Institutional Revolutionary Party	1967–1970	47th Congress
1970	Tarsicio González Gutiérrez	Institutional Revolutionary Party	1970–1973	48th Congress
1973	Rodolfo Echeverría Ruiz	Institutional Revolutionary Party	1973–1976	49th Congress
1976	Enrique Álvarez del Castillo	Institutional Revolutionary Party	1976–1979	50th Congress
1979	Carlos Robles Loustaunau	Institutional Revolutionary Party	1979–1982	51st Congress
1982	Daniel Belanzario Díaz	Institutional Revolutionary Party	1982–1985	52nd Congress
1985	Federico Granja Ricalde	Institutional Revolutionary Party	1985–1988	53rd Congress
1988	Guillermo Jiménez Morales	Institutional Revolutionary Party	1988–1991	54th Congress
1991	Alfredo Villegas Arreola	Institutional Revolutionary Party	1991–1994	55th Congress
1994	María de la Luz Lima Malvido	Institutional Revolutionary Party	1994–1997	56th Congress
1997	Armando López Romero (Note: López Romero broke with the PRD and declared himself an independent in August 1999.)	Party of the Democratic Revolution Independent politician	1997–2000	57th Congress
2000	Manuel Castro y del Valle	National Action Party (Mexico)	2000–2003	58th Congress
2003	Bernardino Ramos Iturbide	Party of the Democratic Revolution	2003–2006	59th Congress
2006	Gerardo Villanueva Albarrán	Party of the Democratic Revolution	2006–2009	60th Congress
2009	Ezequiel Rétiz Gutiérrez	National Action Party (Mexico)	2009–2012	61st Congress
2012	Gerardo Villanueva Albarrán (Note: Elected for the PRD, Villanueva Albarrán switched his allegiance in Congress to the Citizens' Movement on 4 December 2012, and to the National Regeneration Movement on 3 February 2015.)	Party of the Democratic Revolution Citizens' Movement (Mexico) National Regeneration Movement	2012–2015	62nd Congress
2015	Héctor Barrera Marmolejo	National Action Party (Mexico)	2015–2018	63rd Congress
2018	Guadalupe Ramos Sotelo	National Regeneration Movement	2018–2021	64th Congress
2021	Héctor Saúl Téllez Hernández	National Action Party (Mexico)	2021–2024	65th Congress

== Presidential elections ==
Mexico City's 24th district
Election	District won by	Party or coalition	%
2018	Andrés Manuel López Obrador	Juntos Haremos Historia	51.9915
