= 8th federal electoral district of Sinaloa =

Defunct federal electoral district of Mexico

Coordinates: 23°13′N 106°25′W

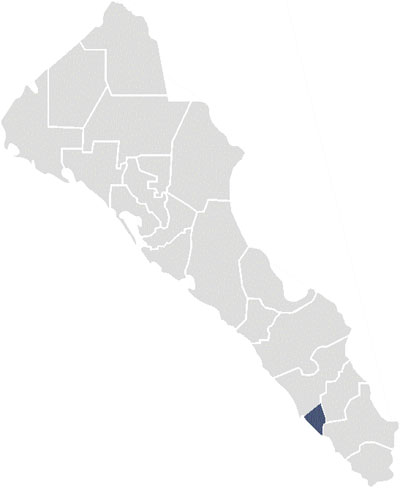
Sinaloa's 8th district in 2005–2017

The 8th federal electoral district of Sinaloa (Spanish: Distrito electoral federal 08 de Sinaloa) is a defunct federal electoral district of Mexico.

During its existence it elected one deputy to the Chamber of Deputies for each three-year legislative session by means of the first-past-the-post system. Votes cast in the district also counted towards the calculation of proportional representation ("plurinominal") deputies elected from the country's electoral regions.

The 8th district was created as part of the 1977 electoral reforms, which increased the number of single-member seats in the Chamber of Deputies from 196 to 300. Under that plan, Sinaloa's seat allocation rose from five to nine. It was dissolved by the National Electoral Institute (INE) in its 2017 redistricting process because the state's population no longer warranted eight districts. Accordingly, it elected its first deputy in the 1979 legislative election and its last in the 2015 legislative election.

== District territory ==
Evolution of electoral district numbers
	1974	1978	1996	2005	2017	2023
Sinaloa	5	9	8	8	7	7
Chamber of Deputies	196	300				

2005–2017

In its final form, the 8th district covered the southern portion of the city of Mazatlán and parts of the municipality of Mazatlán to the south of the city (386 precincts). The city of Mazatlán served as the head town, where results from individual polling stations were gathered together and tallied.

1996–2005

Under the 1996 plan, the 8th district covered most of the city of Mazatlán, which served as the head town.

1978–1996

As initially created, the 8th district covered a portion of the state capital, Culiacán Rosales, and parts of the rural area of its surrounding municipality. The head town was at Culiacán.

== Deputies returned to Congress ==
(Mexico) National parties
- Current
- PAN
- PRI
- PT
- PVEM
- MC
- Morena
- Defunct or local only
- PLM
- PNR
- PRM
- PNM
- PP
- PPS
- PARM
- PFCRN
- Convergencia
- PANAL
- PSD
- PES
- PES
- PRD

Sinaloa's 8th district
Election	Deputy	Party	Term	Legislature
1979	María del Rosario Hernández Barrón	Institutional Revolutionary Party	1979–1982	51st Congress
1982	Saúl Ríos Beltrán	Institutional Revolutionary Party	1982–1985	52nd Congress
1985	Adrían González García	Institutional Revolutionary Party	1985–1988	53rd Congress
1988	Rafael Núñez Pellegrín	National Action Party (Mexico)	1988–1991	54th Congress
1991	Eduardo Cristerna González	Institutional Revolutionary Party	1991–1994	55th Congress
1994	José Feliciano García Peraza	Institutional Revolutionary Party	1994–1997	56th Congress
1997	Víctor Armando Galván Gazcón	Party of the Democratic Revolution	1997–2000	57th Congress
2000	Jorge Alberto Rodríguez Pasos (Note: Rodríguez Pasos took leave of his seat from 8 August 2001 to 6 June 2002. During his absence, he was replaced by his alternate, García Dávila.); Víctor Antonio García Dávila	Labour Party (Mexico)	2000–2003	58th Congress
2003	Alejandro Higuera Osuna (Note: Higuera Osuna resigned his seat on 11 August 2004. He was replaced by his alternate, Corrales Macías.); José Evaristo Corrales Macías	National Action Party (Mexico)	2003–2004; 2004–2006	59th Congress
2006	Carlos Eduardo Felton González	National Action Party (Mexico)	2006–2009	60th Congress
2009	Miguel Ángel García Granados	Institutional Revolutionary Party	2009–2012	61st Congress
2012	Martín Alonso Heredia Lizárraga	National Action Party (Mexico)	2012–2015	62nd Congress
2015	Quirino Ordaz Coppel (Note: Ordaz Coppel took leave of his seat to contend (successfully) for governor of Sinaloa. His alternate, Galindo Rosas, was sworn in on 27 January 2016.); José de Jesús Galindo Rosas	Ecologist Green Party of Mexico	2015–2016; 2016–2018	63rd Congress
