= Jorge Ocejo Moreno =

Mexican politician

- Born: Jorge Andrés Ocejo Moreno; 30 March 1943 (age 83); Mexico City, Mexico
- Education: UNAM
- Occupation: Politician
- Political party: National Action Party

Jorge Andrés Ocejo Moreno (born 30 March 1943) is a Mexican politician affiliated with the National Action Party (PAN). He served as a federal deputy in the LVI Legislature of the Mexican Congress (1994–1997) and as a senator representing the Federal District in the LX (2006–2009) and LXI (2009–2012) Legislatures. He was president of the Christian Democrat Organization of America (ODCA) from 2010 to 2016.

== Education and early career ==
Ocejo Moreno was born in Mexico City on 30 March 1943 and studied at the National Autonomous University of Mexico (UNAM). His academic interests include social economics and the third sector.

== Chamber of Deputies ==
Ocejo Moreno served as a federal deputy for the PAN in the LVI Legislature from 1994 to 1997. During this period, he chaired the Commerce Commission (Comisión de Comercio) of the Chamber of Deputies, where he oversaw the review and disposition of pending legislative initiatives, including proposed reforms to the income tax law. He also participated in the emerging economies commission of the Latin American Parliament, working alongside legislators from multiple parties on regional economic issues following the 1994 Mexican economic crisis.

== Senate ==
Ocejo Moreno was elected to the Senate of the Republic representing the Federal District and served in the LX (2006–2009) and LXI (2009–2012) Legislatures. As a senator, he chaired the Economic Development Commission (Comisión de Fomento Económico), where he led efforts to modernize cooperative legislation in Mexico. Beginning in 2010, Ocejo organized a series of regional forums and workshops in consultation with cooperatives, academic specialists, and legislators from both chambers of Congress, culminating in the Senate's approval of a new General Law of Cooperative Societies (Ley General de Sociedades Cooperativas).

He also served as Mexico's vice president to the Latin American Parliament (Parlatino), representing Mexico on its executive board and participating in sessions on regional integration, indigenous rights, and inter-parliamentary cooperation. In that capacity, he spoke on topics including Mexico's relationship with Mercosur and Latin American economic integration.

== ODCA presidency ==
On 30 July 2010, Ocejo Moreno was elected by unanimous vote as president of the Christian Democrat Organization of America (ODCA) at its 19th Congress in San Salvador, succeeding fellow PAN member Manuel Espino Barrientos. He was reelected unanimously for a second three-year term (2013–2016) at the 20th Congress held in Mexico City, where he was the sole candidate.

As ODCA president, Ocejo promoted Christian democratic principles across the Americas, organized international forums on democracy and human rights in the region, and led observer missions to elections in countries such as Venezuela. He also organized forums on political participation by Christians in democracy, in collaboration with the Konrad Adenauer Foundation.
