= Benjamín González =

Benjamín González may refer to:

- Benjamín González Gómez (1958–2011), Spanish athlete
- Benjamín González Roaro (born 1954), Mexican politician
