= Gerardo Villanueva Albarrán =

Mexican politician

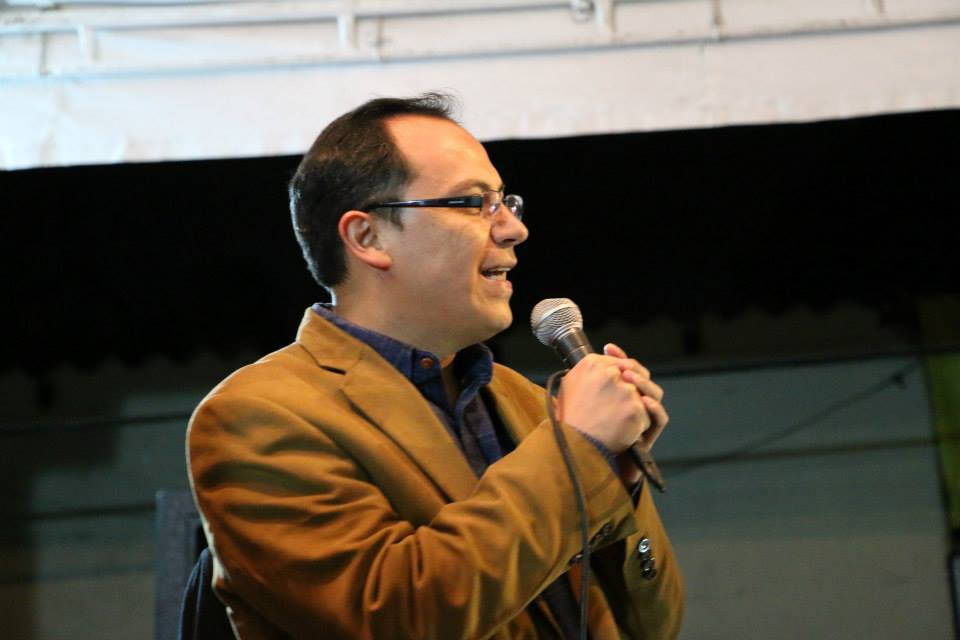
- Gerardo Villanueva in 2014
- Born: 18 September 1972 (age 53); Mexico City, Mexico
- Occupation: Politician
- Political party: PRD (1990s–2012) MC (2012–2014); MORENA (2014–present)

Gerardo Villanueva Albarrán (born 18 September 1972) is a Mexican politician affiliated with the National Regeneration Movement who formerly belonged to both the Citizens' Movement (MC) and the Party of the Democratic Revolution (PRD).

He has been elected to the Chamber of Deputies to represent the 24th district of the Federal District for the PRD on two occasions: in the 2006 general election and in the 2012 general election. During his second term in Congress he switched his allegiance to the Citizens' Movement on 4 December 2012, and to the National Regeneration Movement (Morena) on 3 February 2015.
