= David Cervantes =

Mexican architect and politician (1959–2022)

Member of the Chamber of Deputies of Mexico
- In office 1 September 1997 – 31 August 2000
- Preceded by: José Eduardo Escobedo Miramontes
- Succeeded by: Jorge Alberto Lara Rivera
- Constituency: 30th district of the Federal District

Personal details
- Born: David Ricardo Cervantes Peredo; 8 November 1959
- Died: 18 June 2022 (aged 62)
- Party: PRD
- Education: National Autonomous University of Mexico
- Occupation: Architect

David Ricardo Cervantes Peredo (8 November 1959 – 18 June 2022) was a Mexican politician. A member of the Party of the Democratic Revolution (PRD), he served in the Chamber of Deputies from 1997 to 2000, representing Mexico City's 30th district. He had previously served in the Legislative Assembly of the Federal District from 1994 to 1997.

Cervantes died on 18 June 2022 at the age of 62.
