= Benjamín Castillo =

Benjamín Castillo may refer to:

- Benjamín Castillo Plascencia (1945–2026), Mexican prelate of the Roman Catholic Church
- Benjamín Castillo Valdez (born 1959), Mexican politician from Baja California
