= Rodolfo Echeverría =

Rodolfo Echeverría may refer to:

- Rodolfo Echeverría Álvarez ("Rodolfo Landa", 1926–2004), Mexican actor and politician
- Rodolfo Echeverría Ruiz (born 1946), Mexican politician and diplomat
