= Carlos Felton =

Mexican politician

- Born: 22 August 1958 (age 67); Mazatlán, Sinaloa, Mexico
- Occupation: Politician
- Political party: PAN

Carlos Eduardo Felton González (born 22 August 1958) is a Mexican politician from the National Action Party (PAN). In the 2006 general election he was elected to the Chamber of Deputies to represent Sinaloa's 8th district during the 60th session of Congress.
