= César Antonio Chávez Castillo =

Mexican politician

- Born: 31 December 1951 (age 74); Mexico City, Mexico
- Occupation: Politician
- Political party: PRD

César Antonio Chávez Castillo (born 31 December 1951) is a Mexican politician affiliated with the Party of the Democratic Revolution. He served as Deputy of the LVI and LIX Legislatures of the Mexican Congress as a plurinominal representative.
