= Víctor Antonio García Dávila =

Mexican politician

- Born: 6 April 1954 (age 72); Delicias, Chihuahua, Mexico
- Occupation: Politician
- Political party: PT

Víctor Antonio García Dávila (born 6 April 1954) is a Mexican politician from the Labor Party (PT). From 2001 to 2002 he sat in the Chamber of Deputies to represent Sinaloa's 8th district during the 58th session of Congress as the alternate of Jorge Alberto Rodríguez Pasos.
