= Ezequiel Rétiz =

Mexican politician

- Born: 6 December 1973 (age 52); Mexico City, Mexico
- Occupation: Politician
- Political party: PAN

Ezequiel Rétiz Gutiérrez (born 6 December 1973) is a Mexican politician from the National Action Party (PAN). In the 2009 mid-terms he was elected to the Chamber of Deputies to represent the 24th district of the Federal District during the 61st session of Congress.
