= Miguel Ángel García Granados =

Mexican politician

- Born: 12 January 1952 (age 74); Mazatlán, Sinaloa, Mexico
- Occupation: Politician
- Political party: PRI

Miguel Ángel García Granados (born 12 January 1952) is a Mexican politician from the Institutional Revolutionary Party (PRI). In the 2009 mid-terms he was elected to the Chamber of Deputies to represent Sinaloa's 8th district during the 61st session of Congress.
