= 32nd federal electoral district of the Federal District =

Defunct federal electoral district of Mexico

Coordinates: 19°24′N 99°11′W

The 32nd federal electoral district of the Federal District (Spanish: Distrito electoral federal 32 del Distrito Federal) is a defunct federal electoral district of Mexico. Occupying a portion of what is today Mexico City, it was in existence from 1978 to 1996.

During that time, it returned one deputy to the Chamber of Deputies for each three-year legislative session by means of the first-past-the-post system, electing its first in the 1979 mid-terms and its last in the 1994 general election. Votes cast in the district also counted towards the calculation of proportional representation ("plurinominal") deputies elected from the country's electoral regions.

The 31st to 40th districts were abolished by the Federal Electoral Institute (IFE) in its 1996 redistricting process because the capital's population no longer warranted that number of seats in Congress.

== District territory ==
Evolution of electoral district numbers
	1974	1978	1996	2005	2017	2023
Mexico City (Federal District)	27	40	30	27	24	22
Chamber of Deputies	196	300				

The districting scheme in force from 1978 to 1996 was the result of the 1977 electoral reforms, which increased the number of single-member seats in the Chamber of Deputies from 196 to 300. Under that plan, the Federal District's seat allocation rose from 27 to 40. The 32nd district covered a portion of the borough of Miguel Hidalgo in the north-west of the city.

== Deputies returned to Congress ==
(Mexico) National parties
- Current
- PAN
- PRI
- PT
- PVEM
- MC
- Morena
- Defunct or local only
- PLM
- PNR
- PRM
- PNM
- PP
- PPS
- PARM
- PFCRN
- Convergencia
- PANAL
- PSD
- PES
- PES
- PRD

Federal District's 32nd district
Election	Deputy	Party	Term	Legislature
1979	Joaquín Álvarez Ordoñez	Institutional Revolutionary Party	1979–1982	51st Congress
1982	Luz Lajous de Madrazo	Institutional Revolutionary Party	1982–1985	52nd Congress
1985	Fernando Ulibarri Pérez	Institutional Revolutionary Party	1985–1988	53rd Congress
1988	Joaquín Álvarez Ordoñez	Institutional Revolutionary Party	1988–1991	54th Congress
1991	Rodolfo Antonio Echeverría Ruiz	Institutional Revolutionary Party	1991–1994	55th Congress
1994	Roberto Rafael Campa Cifrián	Institutional Revolutionary Party	1994–1997	56th Congress
