= Martín Alonso Heredia =

Mexican politician

- Born: 9 January 1964 (age 62); Elota, Sinaloa, Mexico
- Education: IPN
- Occupation: Politician
- Political party: PAN

Martín Alonso Heredia Lizárraga (born 9 January 1964) is a Mexican politician affiliated with the National Action Party (PAN). In the 2012 general election he was elected to the Chamber of Deputies to represent Sinaloa's 8th district during the 62nd session of Congress. He had previously served as the municipal president of Cosalá, Sinaloa, from 1993 to 1995.
