= Salvador Martínez della Rocca =

Mexican politician

- Born: 10 November 1945 (age 80); Los Mochis, Sinaloa, Mexico
- Education: National Autonomous University of Mexico
- Occupation: Politician
- Political party: PRD

Salvador Pablo Martínez della Rocca (born 10 November 1945) is a Mexican politician affiliated with the Party of the Democratic Revolution (PRD).

Martínez della Rocca has served two terms in the Chamber of Deputies:

- 1994–1997 (56th Congress), as a plurinominal deputy
- 2003–2006 (59th Congress), for Mexico City's 30th district.

From 1998 to 2000 he was the borough chief of Tlalpan, Mexico City.
