= Armando Quintero Martínez =

Mexican politician

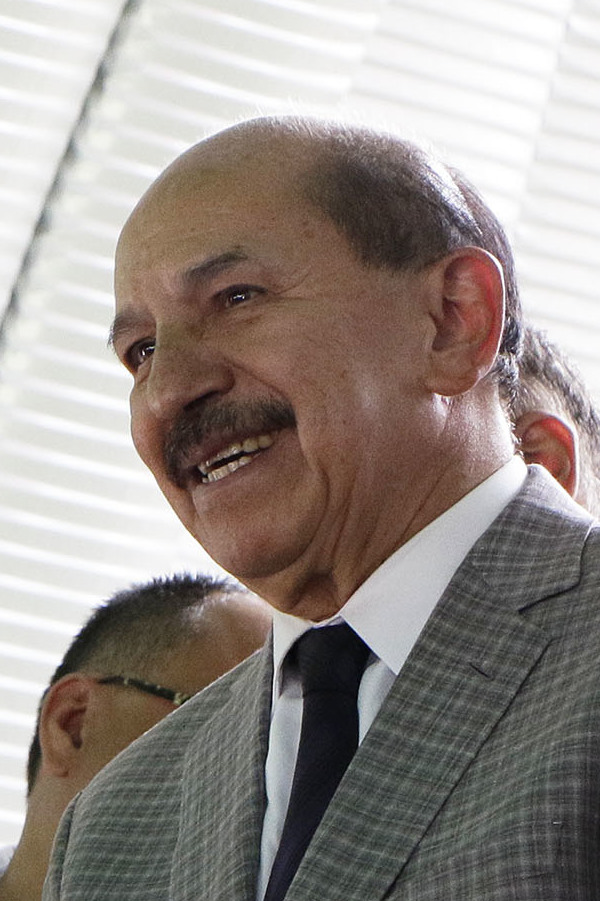
Armando Quintero Martínez

Armando Quintero Martínez (born 25 November 1954 in Mexico City) is a Mexican left-wing politician and labor leader affiliated with Movimiento Ciudadano.

== Political career ==
Quintero is a founder and labor leader of the UNAM's Workers Union (Sindicato de Trabajadores de la Universidad Nacional Autónoma de México or STUNAM); he is also one of the PRD founders. Quintero served in the lower house of the Mexican Congress during the LVI Legislature. In 2000, he gained a seat in the Legislative Assembly of the Federal District, and in 2003 he was elected borough mayor (jefe delegacional) in Iztacalco, Mexican Federal District. He ran again for the Iztacalco mayorship in 2015 after switching parties from the Party of the Democratic Revolution to Movimiento Ciudadano.
