= Susana Manzanares =

Mexican politician

- Born: 19 September 1958; Iguala, Guerrero, Mexico
- Died: 6 October 2008 (aged 50); Mexico City, Mexico
- Occupation: Politician
- Political party: PRD

Susana Guillermina Manzanares Córdova (19 September 1958 – 6 October 2008) was a Mexican politician affiliated with the Party of the Democratic Revolution (PRD). She served as a deputy during the 59th session of Congress (2003–2006), representing the Federal District's 29th district.
