= Fernando Pérez Noriega =

Mexican politician

- Born: 12 August 1956 (age 70); Mexico City, Mexico
- Education: Escuela Libre de Derecho; Columbia Law School
- Occupation: Politician
- Political party: PAN

Fernando Pérez Noriega (born 12 August 1956) is a Mexican politician from the National Action Party. He has served as Deputy of the LVI and LVIII Legislatures of the Mexican Congress representing the Federal District, as well as a local deputy in the Legislative Assembly of the Federal District.
