= Manuel Castro y del Valle =

Mexican politician

- Born: 18 September 1944 (age 81); Mexico City, Mexico
- Occupation: Politician
- Political party: PAN

Manuel Castro y del Valle (born 18 September 1944) is a Mexican politician from the National Action Party (PAN). In the 2000 general election he was elected to the Chamber of Deputies to represent the 24th district of the Federal District during the 58th Congress.
