= Carlos Flores Vizcarra =

Mexican politician and diplomat

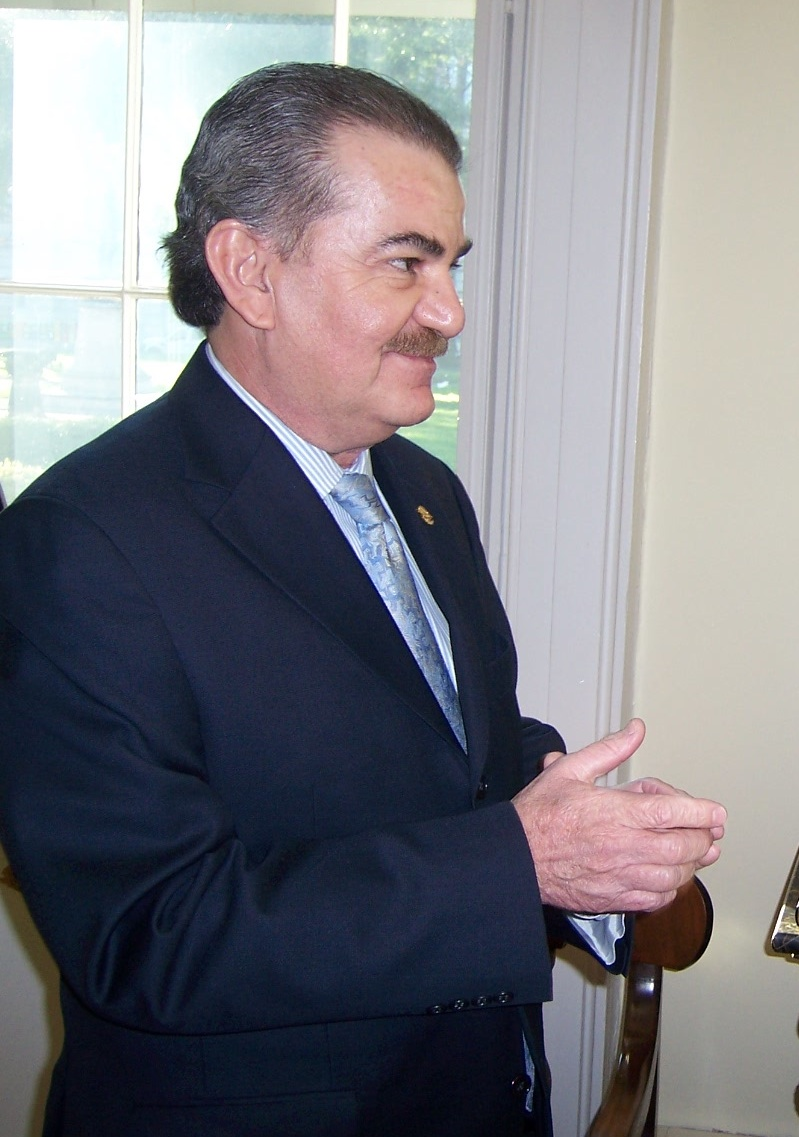
- Born: 22 July 1952 (age 73); Mexico City, Mexico
- Status: Consultant for Mexico and Latin America Engagement. October 2021-
- Occupation: Thunderbird School of Global Management. Arizona State University.Former Mexican Diplomat

Carlos Flores Vizcarra (born July 22, 1952) is a Mexican politician and former diplomat.

Flores Vizcarra grew up in Mazatlan, Sinaloa, and studied at the National Autonomous University of Mexico (UNAM). He received his master's degree in Economics from the University of Paris III.

Flores Vizcarra served as a federal deputy in 1994–1997 during the 56th Congress, representing the Federal District's 35th district.

In the Secretariat of Foreign Affairs, Flores Vizcarra served as:

- Consul of Mexico in Tucson, Arizona.
- Consul General of Mexico in Phoenix, Arizona.
- Consul General of Mexico in North Carolina and South Carolina.
- Consul of Mexico in Calexico, California.
