= Sergio Tolento Hernández =

Mexican politician

- Born: 22 December 1959 (age 66); Mexicali, Baja California, Mexico
- Education: UAG
- Occupations: Surgeon and politician
- Political party: PAN

Sergio Tolento Hernández (born 22 December 1959) is a Mexican surgeon and politician from the National Action Party (PAN). From 2009 to 2012 Tolento Hernández served as a federal deputy in the 61st Congress, representing Baja California's first district. He was named the Baja California secretary of health in 2014.
