= José Evaristo Corrales Macías =

Mexican politician

- Occupation: Politician
- Political party: PAN

José Evaristo Corrales Macías is a Mexican politician affiliated with the National Action Party (PAN). From 2004 to 2006 he served as a federal deputy during the 59th session of Congress representing Sinaloa's 8th district as the alternate of Alejandro Higuera.

Corrales Macías had previously served as a local deputy in the 56th session of the Congress of Sinaloa.
