= Bernardino Ramos Iturbide =

Mexican politician

- Born: 20 May 1963 (age 63); Mexico City, Mexico
- Occupation: Politician
- Political party: PRD

Bernardino Ramos Iturbide (born 20 May 1963) is a Mexican politician affiliated with the Party of the Democratic Revolution (PRD). In the 2003 mid-terms he was elected to the Chamber of Deputies to represent the 24th district of the Federal District during the 59th Congress.
