= Roberto Campa =

Mexican lawyer and politician

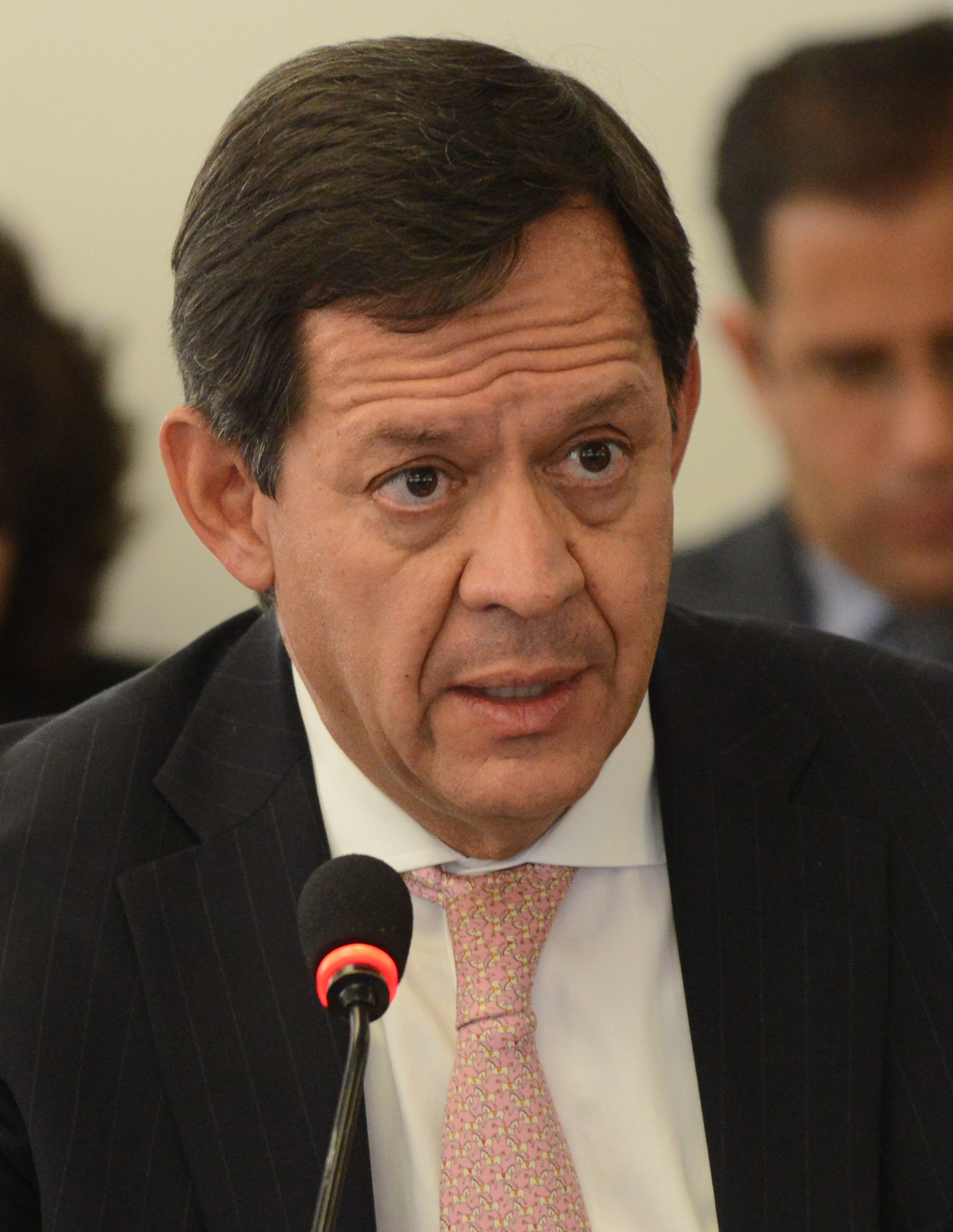

Secretary of Labor
- In office 10 January 2018 – 30 November 2018
- President: Enrique Peña Nieto
- Preceded by: Alfonso Navarrete Prida
- Succeeded by: Luisa María Alcalde Luján

Secretary General of the National Confederation of Popular Organizations
- In office 5 February 2002 – 4 March 2002
- Preceded by: Elba Esther Gordillo
- Succeeded by: Manlio Fabio Beltrones

Member of the Chamber of Deputies for the Federal District's 32nd district
- In office 1 November 1994 – 31 August 1997
- Preceded by: Rodolfo Echeverría Ruiz
- Succeeded by: District abolished

Personal details
- Born: 11 January 1957 (age 68); Mexico City, Mexico
- Education: Universidad Anáhuac

Roberto Rafael Campa Cifrián (born 11 January 1957) is a Mexican lawyer and politician who was the New Alliance presidential candidate in the 2006 elections. His slogan was Uno de tres ("One out of three", referring to his party's request that voters give them one of their three votes, for senators, deputies, or president).

== Political career ==
Campa holds a bachelor's degree in law from the Universidad Anáhuac. As a member of the Institutional Revolutionary Party (PRI) he was elected to public office several times and served in the Federal District government in various positions during the 1980s. From 1991 to 1994 he served in the Federal District Legislative Assembly and in 1994 he was elected to serve in the Chamber of Deputies. From 1997 to 1999 he served as the head of the Procuraduría Federal del Consumidor (consumer protection agency). In 2003 he was elected again to the Chamber of Deputies.

During the PRI primaries for the 2006 elections Campa joined the PRI group Unidad Democrática, also known as TUCOM (Spanish acronym for Todos Unidos Contra Madrazo, a reference to party boss and eventual candidate Roberto Madrazo). He resigned from the PRI in 2005.

On 10 January 2018 he was named the Secretary of Labor by President Enrique Peña Nieto.

== Presidential run ==
On 8 January 2006 the New Alliance party elected Campa Cifrián as its presidential candidate for the 2006 election. At the end of the day, he secured around 1% of the total vote.
