= Andrés Galván Rivas =

Mexican politician

- Born: 29 August 1960 (age 65); Canatlán, Durango, Mexico
- Occupations: Deputy and Senator
- Political party: PAN

Andrés Galván Rivas (born 29 August 1960) is a Mexican politician affiliated with the PAN. As of 2013 he served as Senator of the LX and LXI Legislatures of the Mexican Congress representing Durango. He also served as Deputy between 1994 and 1997.
