= Martina Montenegro Espinoza =

Mexican politician (born 1948)

Martina Montenegro Espinoza (born January 1, 1948) is a Mexican politician, known for being the first female municipal president of Mexicali and having a career of more than 50 years in politics in Mexico.

== Biography ==
Born in Potrero de Cháidez, Durango, Montenegro Espinoza joined the Institutional Revolutionary Party in 1968. She began her career in public administration in 1971 as the first official in the private secretariat of the municipal presidential office of Mexicali; Later, in 1974, she took office as councilor of the VIII city council, to later become the first female mayor of that municipality in 1975.

From 1986 to 1989, Montenegro Espinoza was an official of the Civil Registry Office, where she promoted the omission of the reading of Epistle of Melchor Ocampo, written in 1859, for being offensive to gender equality.

She was part of the LVII Legislature of the Senate, she has also been a local deputy in the Congress of Baja California when she only shared with two female deputies and in the LVI Federal Legislature where there were only 77 female legislators out of 500 members.

In 2015, Montenegro Espinoza was appointed municipal delegate in Playas de Tijuana.

She coordinated the research and publication of the book Mexicali, 100 años y más de 100 mujeres.

== Recognitions ==
- In 1972 she was named Woman of the Year by the International Women's Year Committee.
- Forjadora of the Year 2017, for her outstanding work as a public official recognized by the Grupo Madrugadores de Playas de Tijuana.
