= Roberto Pérez de Alva =

Mexican politician (born 1953)

- Born: 2 April 1953 (age 73); Mexico City, Mexico
- Occupation: Politician
- Political party: PRI

Roberto Pérez de Alva Blanco (born 2 April 1953) is a Mexican politician affiliated with the Institutional Revolutionary Party. He served as Senator of the LVIII and LIX Legislatures of the Mexican Congress representing Baja California and as Deputy of the LVII Legislature. He also served as a local deputy in the XV Legislature of the Congress of Baja California.
