= Alejandro Higuera =

Mexican politician

- Born: 17 February 1963 (age 63); Mazatlán, Sinaloa, Mexico
- Occupation: Politician
- Political party: PAN

Alejandro Higuera Osuna (born 17 February 1963) is a Mexican politician affiliated with the National Action Party (PAN). In the 2003 mid-terms he was elected to the Chamber of Deputies to represent Sinaloa's 8th district during the 59th session of Congress. He resigned his seat on 11 August 2004 and was replaced for the remainder of his term by his alternate, José Evaristo Corrales Macías.
