= Benjamín Castillo Valdez =

Mexican politician

- Born: 30 March 1959 (age 67); Mexicali, Baja California, Mexico
- Occupation: Politician
- Political party: PRI

Benjamín Castillo Valdez (born 30 March 1959) is a Mexican politician affiliated with the Institutional Revolutionary Party (PRI). A native of Mexicali, Baja California, in the 2012 general election he was elected to the Chamber of Deputies for Baja California's 1st district.
