= Hidalgo Contreras =

Mexican politician

- Born: 27 December 1969 (age 56); Baja California, Mexico
- Occupation: Politician
- Political party: PAN

Hidalgo Contreras Covarrubias (born 27 December 1969) is a Mexican politician affiliated with the National Action Party. He was a deputy of the LIX Legislature of the Mexican Congress from 2003 to 2006 representing Baja California.
