= Jorge Alberto Lara Rivera =

Mexican lawyer and politician (1966–2024)

- Born: 31 December 1966; Mexico City, Mexico
- Died: 22 July 2024 (aged 57)
- Occupation: Politician
- Political party: PAN

Jorge Alberto Lara Rivera (31 December 1966 – 22 July 2024) was a Mexican lawyer and politician from the National Action Party (PAN).

== Life and career ==
Lara graduated with a degree in law from the National Autonomous University of Mexico (UNAM) before pursuing graduate studies at the Escuela Libre de Derecho and the Instituto Nacional de Ciencias Penales.

In the 2000 general election he was elected to the Chamber of Deputies to represent the Federal District's 30th congressional district (Tlalpan) during the 58th session of Congress.

Lara served as Deputy Attorney General of the Republic (subprocurador) for legal and international affairs from 2009 to 2011 during the presidential administration of Felipe Calderón.

Jorge Lara Rivera died on 22 July 2024, at the age of 57.
