= Benjamín González Roaro =

Mexican politician

- Born: 28 December 1954 (age 71); Mexico City, Mexico
- Education: National Autonomous University of Mexico
- Occupation: Politician
- Political party: PRI/PAN

Benjamín Ernesto González Roaro (born 28 December 1954) is a Mexican politician. Prior to 2006 he belonged to the Institutional Revolutionary Party (PRI), after which he aligned himself with the National Action Party (PAN).

González Roaro was born in Mexico City. From 2000 to 2006 he was the director general of the Institute for Social Security and Services for State Workers (ISSSTE). From 2009 to 2013 he was the director general of the National Lottery.

He has served two terms in the Chamber of Deputies:

- 1991–1994 (55th Congress), as a member of the PRI, for Mexico City's 30th district
- 2006–2009 (60th Congress), as a member of the PAN, as a plurinominal deputy for the fourth region.
