= Rodolfo Echeverría Ruiz =

Mexican politician and diplomat (born 1946)

- Born: 19 June 1946 (age 79); Mexico City, Mexico
- Occupations: Politician and diplomat
- Political party: PRI

Rodolfo Antonio Echeverría Ruiz (born 19 June 1946) is a Mexican politician and diplomat from the Institutional Revolutionary Party (PRI).

He has served in the Chamber of Deputies on three occasions: in 1973–1976 (49th Congress) for the Federal District's 24th district, in 1991–1994 (55th Congress) for the Federal District's 32nd district, and in 2000–2003 (58th Congress) as a plurinominal deputy.

He also served as Ambassador of Mexico to Cuba from 1982 to 1985 and to Spain from 1994 to 1998.

== Personal life ==
Echeverría Ruiz is the son of the actor and politician Rodolfo Landa (1926–2004) and, by the same token, the nephew of President Luis Echeverría Álvarez (1922–2022).
