= Manuel Espino Barrientos =

Mexican politician (born 1959)

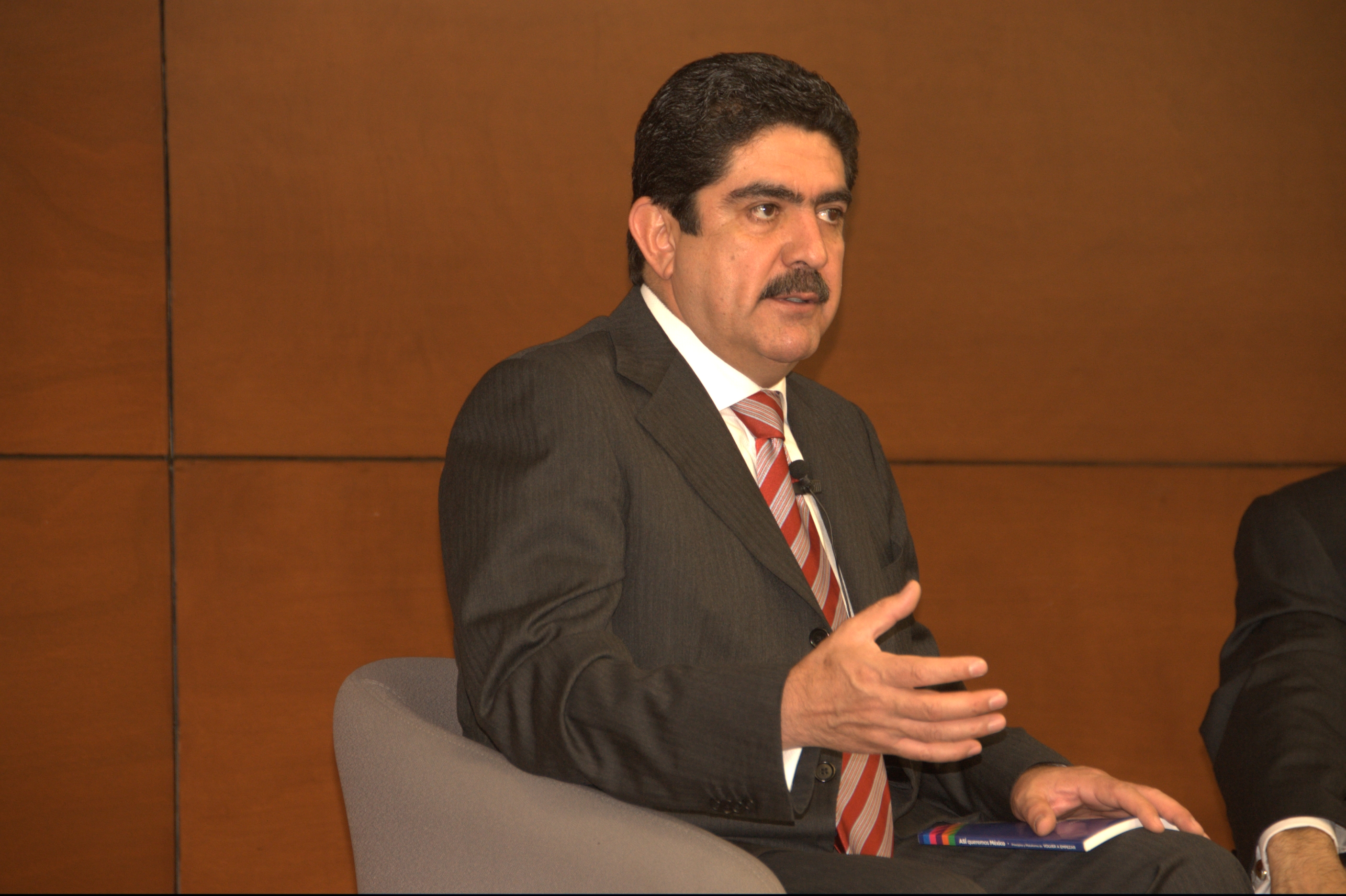
- Manuel Espino Barrientos at the presentation of the book Calderón de cuerpo entero, by Julio Scherer García, at the Monterrey Institute of Technology and Higher Education, Mexico City.

Personal details
- Born: 29 November 1959 (age 66) Durango, Durango
- Party: Movimiento Ciudadano
- Occupation: Politician

Manuel Espino Barrientos (born 29 November 1959) is a Mexican politician affiliated to Movimiento Ciudadano. He is a federal deputy to the LXIII Legislature of the Mexican Congress from the fifth electoral region. Espino also was a federal deputy in the LVIII Legislature and from 2005 to 2007 served as the national president of the PAN.

== Life ==
=== Education and career in Chihuahua ===
In 1979, Espino received his degree as an electrical technician from the Regional Technological Institute of Durango; a year before, he had joined the PAN. He was a frequent representative of the party in electoral matters, as well as a Scout and an instructor teaching business training courses in Ciudad Juárez and Durango; additionally, between 1978 and 1985, he was a middle and high school teacher at various educational institutions in Durango and Ciudad Juárez, as well as an administrator of an accounting and administration company. Between 1983 and 1985, Espino acted as an intervening administrator at Zapatería Bernini, a Ciudad Juárez company. From 1983 and 1988, Espino worked in the General Directorate of Public Security of Ciudad Juárez, first heading the department of Unit Control and later moving to Archives and Statistics; his final year in the agency was spent as a systems director.

1984 also saw Espino get involved in the founding of the Center of Hispanic-American Studies in El Paso, Texas, while the next year, he began a three-year term as president of the Mexican Scouts Association. In 1987, after five years of study, Espino graduated from the Universidad del Noroeste with a degree in business administration; the next year, he began a short stint as a production supervisor at Honeywell Optoelectronics in Ciudad Juárez.

Espino's political career continued to center around the PAN in Ciudad Juárez and Chihuahua. Between 1987 and 1989, he was the secretary of the Civil Resistance organization in the party; he served as a municipal-level general secretary from 1989–91 (which ended when he was tapped to be the interim president of the PAN in Ciudad Juárez), a state councilor between 1990 and 1993, ran for federal deputy in 1991, and served again in the Chihuahua PAN from 1991–92. Also during this time, he was a founding member and vice president of the Foundation for the Cultural Diffusion of America's Half Millennium, between 1989 and 1992.

In 1994, he served as a coordinator of the PAN's federal electoral campaign in Ciudad Juárez, and at the same time, he ran as a proportional representation deputy from the second electoral region. He was the PAN's Security Coordinator and served as a secretary on the National Defense Commission; simultaneously, he served on the national PAN's Secretariat of National Relations, in the department that managed relations with the armed forces.

=== Shift to Sonora ===
In 1996, Espino became the head of the PAN in Sonora and served on its state executive council from 1999 to 2002. Additionally, he served as the municipal comptroller of Hermosillo between 1998 and 2000.

In 2000, he returned to the Chamber of Deputies in its LVIII Legislature. He presided over the Special Commission on Public Security and also served on the Energy Commission. During this time, he simultaneously served as the travel coordinator for President Vicente Fox, as a national councilor for the PAN, and from 2002 to 2005, as the secretary general of the national PAN organization and a consultant to Grupo Industrial Fuentes.

=== Presidency of the PAN and expulsion ===
In 2005, Manuel Espino succeeded Luis Felipe Bravo and became the 18th president of the National Action Party, a position he held for two years. On November 11, 2006, he was elected president of the Christian Democrat Organization of America, a post he held until July 30, 2010, and between 2006 and 2009, he also was the vice president of Centrist Democrat International. However, during this time, a rift began to grow between Espino and the PAN president, Felipe Calderón Hinojosa; he also disagreed with the federal government's security strategy, calling it "one of the bloodiest". The end of Espino's presidency in 2007 and his replacement with Germán Martínez Cázares, identified as close to Calderón, came months after Espino and those associated with the highly conservative group Desarrollo Humano Integral, A.C., lost national party positions to supporters of Calderón.

In 2010, he founded the Movimiento Nacional Volver a Empezar (National Start Over Movement). That year, the national PAN voted to begin the process of expelling Espino from the party, with only one member voting against the measure; this would culminate in his expulsion from the party after 33 years in May 2011; Espino promised to bring the case before the TEPJF. When he met with Enrique Peña Nieto, who at the time was seeking election from the Institutional Revolutionary Party, he promised Peña Nieto that he would promote the "useful vote" for Peña Nieto among the 941,000 members of Volver a Empezar, which in turn prompted then-PAN leader Gustavo Madero Muñoz to note that one of the reasons for Espino's expulsion from the party was his previous support for PRI candidates.

His business activities continued throughout this period; in 2010, he opened a restaurant in Durango, known as El Esquilón. He also owned a parking facility and administered the company Negocios Maryam.

=== Movimiento Ciudadano and return to San Lázaro ===
In 2013, Espino started a political group known as Concertación Mexicana. The group included other former members of the PAN and PRD, such as René Arce (who returned to the PRD in 2015) and Jorge Carlos Díaz Cuervo. While it promised to be a "party that was not ideological", it was derided as being a "Frankenstein" group. However, in its attempts to become a political party, it ran into obstacles; in Puebla, it failed to get 3,000 people to attend its first meeting, as was required, and in the states where it did meet the numbers, it did so using infrastructure of state-level political parties. When he traveled to an event in Cuernavaca, organizers had to remove dozens of empty chairs from the venue. Ultimately, Espino decided not to form a political party.

On December 6, 2014, Espino officially joined the Movimiento Ciudadano political party. The next year, MC placed Espino on its list for proportional representation deputies from the fifth district, winning him a seat in the Chamber of Deputies for the LXIII Legislature. He is a secretary on the National Defense and Public Security Committees and also holds a seat on the Commission for the Strengthening of Federalism. Movimiento Ciudadano has also allied with Concertación Mexicana in select regions, such as Quintana Roo and on the national level while it worked with the Peninsular Party of the Californias in Baja California and with Alternativa Veracruzana in Veracruz.

== Books ==
Espino has written various books, including Señal de Alerta (2008), which warned that Manlio Fabio Beltrones might run for president in 2012; Volver a Empezar (Start Over, 2010); La guerra injusta de Ciudad Juárez (The Unjust War of Ciudad Juárez, 2010), in which he called the drug war started by Calderón "the bloodiest conflict on Mexican soil since the Revolution"; El Poder del Águila (The Power of the Eagle, 2012); and Mexicanos al Grito de Paz (2015).

Preceded by Luis Felipe Bravo	President of the National Action Party; 2005—2007	Succeeded by Germán Martínez Cázares
