= 2006 Mexican general election =

- 2 July 2006
- Presidential election
- Turnout: 58.55% (▼5.42pp)
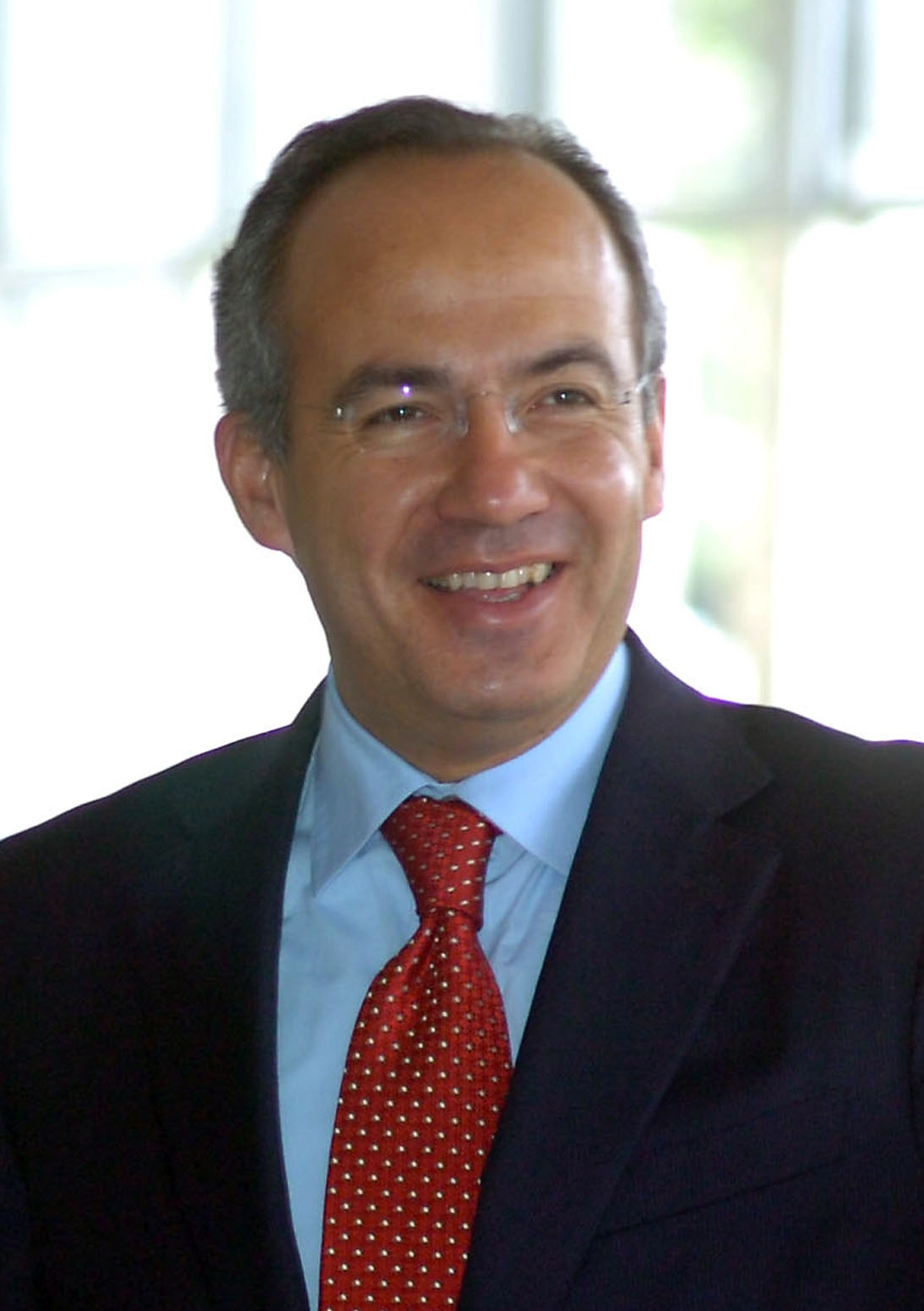

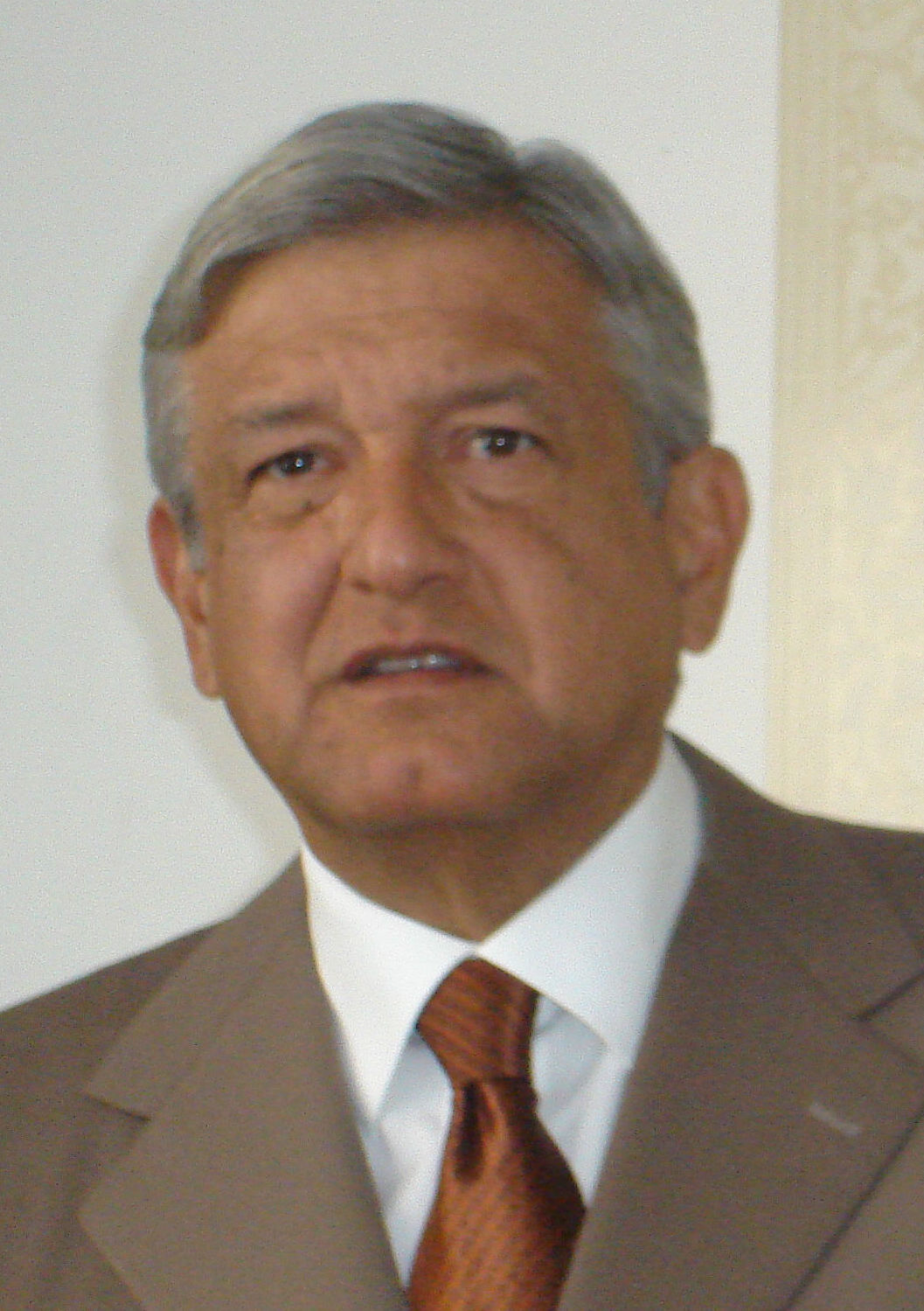

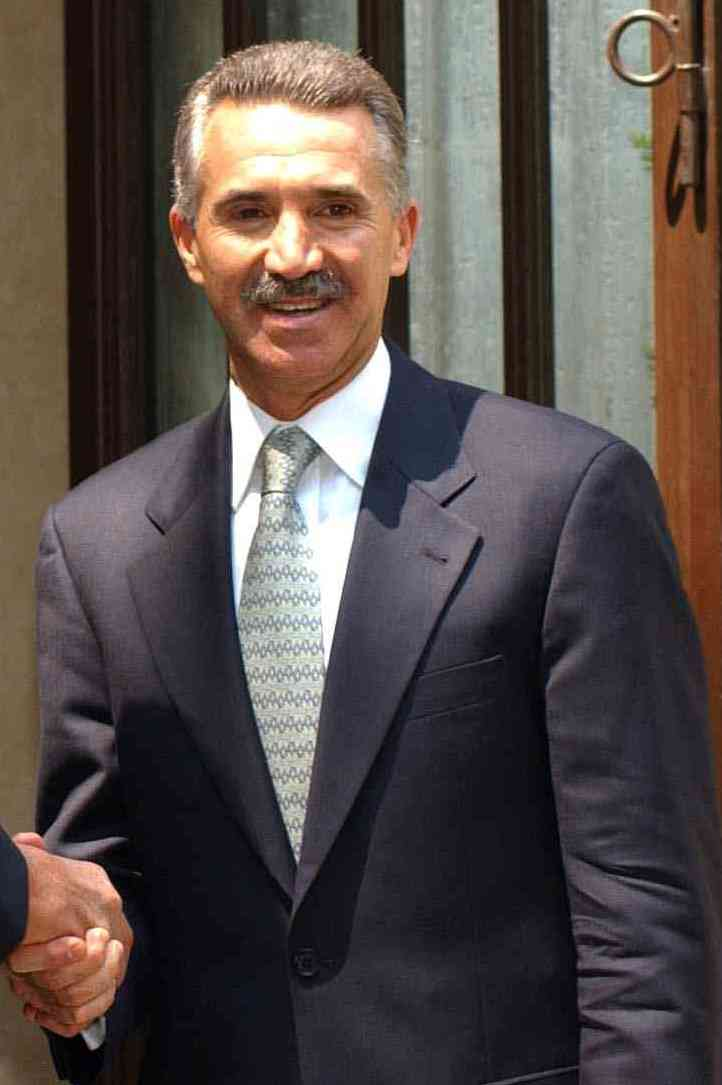
Nominee	Felipe Calderón	Andrés Manuel López Obrador	Roberto Madrazo
Party	PAN	PRD	PRI
Alliance		Coalition for the Good of All	Alliance for Mexico
Popular vote	15,000,284	14,756,350	9,301,441
Percentage	36.69%	36.09%	22.75%
- Calderón (27627) López (25066) Madrazo (9415) Mercado (2) Campa (5) Tie (277) No data (9148)
President before election
Vicente Fox
PAN
Elected President
Felipe Calderón
PAN
- Senate
- All 128 seats in the Senate of the Republic; 65 seats needed for a majority
Party	Vote %	Seats	+/–
PAN	34.47	52	−8
Coalition for the Good of All	30.45	36	New
Alliance for Mexico	28.69	39	New
PNA	4.15	1	New
This lists parties that won seats. See the complete results below.
Results by state
- Chamber of Deputies
- All 500 seats in the Chamber of Deputies; 251 seats needed for a majority
Party	Vote %	Seats	+/–
PAN	34.27	206	+55
Coalition for the Good of All	29.74	158	New
Alliance for Mexico	28.90	123	New
PNA	4.66	9	New
PASC	2.11	4	New
This lists parties that won seats. See the complete results below.
Results by constituency

General elections were held in Mexico on Sunday, 2 July 2006. Voters went to the polls to elect a new President of the Republic to serve a six-year term, replacing then President Vicente Fox (ineligible for re-election under the 1917 Constitution); 500 members of the Chamber of Deputies (300 by the first-past-the-post system and 200 by proportional representation) to serve for three-year terms; and 128 members of the Senate (three per state by limited voting and 32 by proportional representation from national party lists) to serve for six-year terms.

Several local ballots were also held on the same day, including the head and legislature of the federal district, governors of Guanajuato, Jalisco and Morelos and local councillors in several states.

Due to controversial events in Mexican politics in the years preceding the election, the negative and aggressive tone of the presidential campaign, the personal interference of President Vicente Fox to favor the candidate of his party the National Action Party of Felipe Calderón, as well as the controversial and extremely close results that gave Calderón a lead of 0.6% of the vote (or 243,934 votes) over his rival Andrés Manuel López Obrador, member of the Party of the Democratic Revolution (who subsequently refused to recognize the results and claimed that the election had been rigged against him), Mexico went through a political crisis for the remainder of the year, as López Obrador called for protests throughout the country and proclaimed himself to be the "Legitimate President", while legislators of his party protested the inauguration of Felipe Calderón as President on 1 December. At the same time, the southern state of Oaxaca was marked by severe civil unrest during 2006 after a teachers' strike was violently repressed by Governor Ulises Ruiz Ortiz, which led to protests calling for his resignation; the 2 July elections in many regions of that state were disturbed by the ongoing conflict.

Although there were nationwide protests by López Obrador's supporters calling for a complete recount of the votes, this was rejected by the Federal Electoral Tribunal, which only authorized a recount in less than 10% of the polling stations and later concluded that the irregularities in the election hadn't been grave enough to change the outcome of the election.

On 5 September, Calderón was officially declared by the Tribunal as the winner of the election. Analysts agree that Calderón's launch of the Mexican drug war on 11 December (only ten days after taking office as President) was an extraordinary step to gain popular support and to cement his legitimacy in the aftermath of the convoluted elections and the subsequent crisis.

In 2026, President Fox said in an interview with The Objective that he rigged the election in favor of Calderón. In a subsequent interview, he attempted to take back the statement by saying he had helped Calderón win "with good government, honest government, and honest outcomes with good work."

== Presidential candidates ==
There were five registered candidates for the 2006 presidential election:

Party/Alliance	Photo	Candidate	Slogan
National Action Party		Felipe Calderón	Para que vivamos mejor "So we can live better"
Coalition for the Good of All (PRD, PT, Convergence)		Andrés Manuel López Obrador	Por el bien de todos, primero los pobres "For the Good of All, the poor are first"
Alliance for Mexico (PRI, PVEM)		Roberto Madrazo	Mover a México para que las cosas se hagan "Moving Mexico to get things done"
Social Democratic and Peasant Alternative Party		Patricia Mercado	Palabra de mujer "A woman's word"
New Alliance Party		Roberto Campa	Uno de tres "One out of three"

A non-registered candidate, Víctor González Torres (nicknamed "Dr. Simi" after the mascot of his national drugstore franchise) made a massive marketing campaign to enter the election, in spite of not being registered as an official candidate, and ran as a write-in candidate. His popular slogan was "The same only cheaper", but his campaign slogan was "To serve God and the people of Mexico". Ironically, he frequently stressed the fact that he paid all of his own campaign expenses, thus being the "cheapest" candidate. He was not considered a formal candidate but many press sources still publish his sayings and complaints against IFE, while some sources consider him a sort of "comic relief".

=== Assets, liabilities and annual expenses ===
As of January 2005 only three candidates had made a public declaration of assets, liabilities and annual expenses. These figures were given in pesos, the total value of assets of each candidate follows at an exchange rate of 10.62 pesos to one United States dollar.

Candidate	Assets	Liabilities	Annual expenses	As of (date)
López Obrador	MX$1,295,358 / US$121,973	0	MX$1,165,650 / US$109,760	3 June 2004
Calderón	MX$8,803,885 / US$828,991	–	–	19 January 2006
Madrazo	MX$29,398,668 / US$2,768,236	MX$39,290 / US$2,758	MX$475,000 / US$44,727	19 January 2006

=== Debates ===
A first presidential debate was held on 25 April 2006 with the presence of all candidates with the notable exception of López Obrador. López Obrador had refused to participate in all debates, and said he would only participate in one since long before the first debate was scheduled. The rest of the candidates agreed on leaving an empty chair to symbolize that the fifth candidate was indeed invited.

The silla vacía (Spanish for "empty chair") became the topic of political commentary shows and the press. Excélsior called the empty chair a "double-edged sword" coinciding with other publications and TV shows that leaving the empty chair could be construed as an insult to the audience and an attack to López Obrador. However, by the date of the debates, the statistical tendency in many polls had confirmed Calderón at the second spot and López Obrador still with a single digit advantage over him.

After the first debate some political commentators, media outlets, and polls indicated that Calderón was seen as the winner of the debate, Mercado as the pleasant surprise of the night. and a nervous Madrazo as the worst performer of the night. However, political analysts also said that the debate was unnecessarily full of promises and personal attacks. Analysts considered that López Obrador was negatively affected by his absence and polls later confirmed Calderón having replaced López Obrador as the leading candidate.

A second debate took place on 6 June of the same year, from 20:30 to 22:30, Central Time, with the confirmed presence of all candidates, including López Obrador. Media outlets have given results to telephone polls applied post-debate showing a mixed tendency. Most, like Reforma and Presente, gave Felipe Calderón the lead, but a few, like Diario Monitor, gave it to Andrés Manuel López Obrador.

However, the rise of López Obrador in voter preference polls since the debate seems to indicate that it was the PRD candidate who won it. One of the main causes for this victory may have been the Hildebrando accusation that López Obrador made during the debate.

Before the debate, Carlos Ahumada's wife threatened to release tapes involving allies of López Obrador in suspected acts of corruption, but the release was cancelled due to an attempted murder which is still under investigation. (See: Videoscandals).

Victor González Torres, a national pharmacy entrepreneur nicknamed "Dr. Simi", declared himself a non-registered write-in candidate and tried to enter the building where the debate was to take place. González Torres demanded to be allowed participation in the debate, but he was not allowed to enter the building where he made the demand. He even brought his own chair. Candidates with no political parties are not permitted to compete in elections under Mexican law, and votes for all write-in candidates are counted together, regardless of which write-in candidate the vote was cast.

On 13 June 2006 all political parties, except Nueva Alianza, signed before members of the IFE the Democratic Agreement for the Equality, Legality and Gobernability, in which the main purpose was that everyone agree on a compromise to respect the results of the election.

=== Opinion polls ===
Opinion polls in the run-up to the election showed López Obrador and Calderón neck and neck. The last polls conducted before the polling blackout that begins eight days before the election all showed López Obrador and Calderón tied with the results within the margins of error. Both Reforma and El Universal newspapers, considered by many to be Mexico City's most influential, gave López Obrador a two-point edge over Calderón.

The candidates of the smaller parties also gained ground at the expense of Roberto Madrazo and López Obrador. The last poll from El Universal showed Patricia Mercado of Social Democratic and Farmer Alternative had gained enough support for her party to retain its registry. In the latest Zogby poll, Madrazo, however, trailed the leader Calderón by only 8 points and was only 4 points behind López Obrador.

Averaging the last ten polls conducted before the polling blackout (between 20 June and 23 June), López Obrador edged out Calderón by a razor-thin half percentage point with 35.1%. Calderón had 34.6% and Madrazo came in third with 26%.

Date	Publisher	López Obrador	Calderón	Madrazo
23 June 2006	Reforma	36%	34%	25%
23 June 2006	El Universal	36%	34%	26%
23 June 2006	Ulises Beltran y Asociados	34%	34%	26%
22 June 2006	Milenio Diario	35.4%	30.5%	29.6%
22 June 2006	GEA-ISA	36%	38%	23%
22 June 2006	Alducin y Asociados	34%	38%	24%
22 June 2006	Consulta Mitofsky	36%	33%	27%
21 June 2006	Indermerc	33%	32%	28%
21 June 2006	Marketing Político	34%	37%	26%
20 June 2006	Parametría	36.5%	32.5%	27%
19 June 2006	Zogby	31%	35%	27%
14 June 2006	Reforma	37%	35%	23%
13 June 2006	Milenio Diario	34.2%	31%	29.6%
13 June 2006	Consulta Mitofsky	35%	32%	28%
12 June 2006	El Universal	34%	37%	22%
11 June 2006	GEA-ISA	35%	39%	23%
6 June 2006	El Universal	36%	36%	24%
6 June 2006	Parametría	35.5%	34.4%	27%
5 June 2006	BGC, Beltrán y Asociados	35%	35%	26%
29 May 2006	Milenio Diario	33%	33%	3%
29 May 2006	Consulta Mitofsky	34%	34%	28%
28 May 2006	GEA-ISA	31%	40%	27%
24 May 2006	Reforma%	35%	39%	22%
19 May 2006	Zogby	29%	34%	22%
15 May 2006	El Universal	35%	39%	21%
8 May 2006	Parametría	34%	36%	26%
4 May 2006	GEA-ISA	31%	41%	25%
3 May 2006	Consulta Mitofsky	34%	35%	27%
3 May 2006	Reforma	33%	40%	22%
2 May 2006	Milenio Diario	33%	36%	28%
23 April 2006	Parametría	35%	33%	28%
17 April 2006	El Universal	38%	34%	25%
6 April 2006	Milenio Diario	34%	31%	31%
6 April 2006	Arcop*	33%	36%	29%
27 March 2006	Consulta Mitofsky	37.5%	30.6%	28.8%
27 March 2006	BIMSA	31.2%	25.5%	21.4%
21 March 2006	GEA-ISA	34%	36%	28%
16 March 2006	Reforma	41%	31%	25%
13 March 2006	El Universal	42%	32%	24%
22 February 2006	Consulta Mitofsky	39.4%	29.8%	27.5%
21 February 2006	GEA-ISA	34%	27%	22%
21 February 2006	Reforma	38%	31%	29
20 February 2006	El Universal	30%	27%	22%
23 January 2006	GEA-ISA	35%	35%	29%
26 January 2006	El Universal	33%	27%	2%
20 January 2006	Parametria	35.7%	27.4%	26.2%
20 January 2006	TV Azteca	38%	31%	28
19 January 2006	Reforma	34%	26%	22%
19 January 2006	La Jornada*	39%	27%	22%
18 January 2006	Consulta Mitofsky	38.7%	31.0%	29.2%
8 January 2006	Milenio Diario*	28%	30%	25%
5 December 2005	Univision	34.8%	28.8%	30.4%
21 November 2005	Reforma	29%	28%	21%
5 November 2005	El Universal	34%	22%	18%
Date	Publisher	López Obrador	Calderón	Madrazo

* Polls conducted by Arcop (published in Milenio and showed the first lead of Calderón over López Obrador) and Covarrubias (published in La Jornada, and the one that showed the highest lead of López Obrador) are internal polls, and generally not as reliable as the others.

== Results ==
=== President ===
On 6 July 2006 the Federal Electoral Institute (IFE) announced the final vote count in the 2006 presidential election, resulting in a narrow margin of 0.58 percentage points of victory for Felipe Calderón Hinojosa (PAN). Calderon's victory was confirmed by the Federal courts on 5 September 2006, and he was declared President-elect of Mexico. However, Andrés Manuel López Obrador (PRD), and his party, alleged irregularities in over 30% of the country's polling stations, and still after an unsuccessful judicial appeal of election results the PRD continued to call for street protests.^{details}

==== Quick count ====
The IFE declared at 11:00 pm on 2 July 2006 that the statistics yielded by the official quick count indicated that the presidential election was too close to call, meaning that the difference between the two front-runners was smaller than their margin of error, or 0.3% of the vote. The IFE further declared that the official count, which began on Wednesday, 5 July 2006, was to determine which candidate would be recognized as president elect.

Nevertheless, front-running presidential candidates Felipe Calderón Hinojosa (PAN) and Andrés Manuel López Obrador (PRD) declared themselves the winners, basing their speeches on a number of private exit-polls, some quoted and some not quoted, that gave a lead within the margin of error. PAN chairman Manuel Espino Barrientos requested that IFE declare a winner by the night of 3 July 2006.

Preliminary results clearly showed that PRI-PVEM candidate Roberto Madrazo did not have a realistic chance of winning the presidency. Those results also showed that the smaller parties (Nueva Alianza and Alternativa Socialdemócrata y Campesina) would retain their registration.

The so-called "foreign vote", whereby for the first time Mexican citizens living abroad were allowed to vote, albeit solely in the presidential contest, totalled only slightly more than 32,000 voters. The overall turn-out for this election was approximately 59% of the eligible voters.

==== Preliminary Electoral Results Program ====
The Preliminary Electoral Results Program (Programa de Resultados Electorales Preliminares, or PREP) is mandated by law to provide a quick estimate of the electoral results, but it has no authority to determine the outcome of the election.

This point was made repeatedly by IFE President Ugalde in his official statements as the 2006 electoral process unfolded. The use of the PREP has been criticized because its data has been used by one candidate to proclaim his victory and by the other as supposed evidence of fraud. However, the PREP tends to predict the winner accurately when the difference between candidates is more than 1% (a condition that was not met in this election).

IFE information coordinator René Miranda dismissed PRD allegations that the changes in PREP's numbers were statistically improbable, saying the PREP was used objectively and impartially to "reflect the reality of the country".

==== Official count ====
After the PREP was concluded on 4 July, the official district-based counts were begun on Wednesday 5 July 2006. In accordance with the Federal Code of Electoral Procedures and Institutions (COFIPE), each of Mexico's 300 congressional districts tabulated the votes recorded on the tally sheets (the "actas") for each voting precinct in their district. "In some cases, such as when a tally sheet was illegible, the sealed ballot packets were opened and recounted." All under the eyes of any election observers that any political party cared to provide.

The district committee results, along with the ballots, were then transferred to the IFE in Mexico City, which resulted in the running total shown below. Early returns favored López Obrador, but by 04:07 Mexico City time, Calderón overtook him. By 07:45, Calderón was leading by approximately 0.33% of the vote.

Calderón vs. López Obrador in IFE reports. Note that this shows only the percentages between 34% and 37.5%.

The volatility in the vote count was not unexpected. From the beginning, the IFE stated that running totals should not be construed as a trend, and that the official result would be released only when all polling stations had been counted. Several northern states, which strongly favored the PAN party in the PREP results, were slow in counting their ballots. This delay was at least partially attributable to the double-checking of district station totals with the actual ballot counts, that any political party may ask for under Mexican law.

On 6 July, having narrowly lost the preliminary official count, López Obrador declared his intent to challenge the results before the Federal Electoral Tribunal (TEPJF), and demand a full recount of all ballots in Mexico City. On 8 July, his supporters met at Mexico City's Zócalo square to start what Obrador called "the defense of the popular vote". The PRD also made a presentation on alleged election irregularities, including (as reported in La Jornada), allegations that around 7:00 PM, the IFE's running scoreboard vote tally blinked zero for all candidates for a period of 4 minutes.

The election-inspired protests were largely peaceful, and according to former IFE president José Woldenberg, well within the law. However some unions and PRD supporters called for "civil resistance" if the courts decided to ratify Calderón's victory. Some, like editorialist Armando Fuentes Aguirre, expressed concern that this could lead to armed conflict.

On 5 September 2006 the Federal Electoral Court declared Calderón the definitive winner.

The final vote tally of the top two candidates was Calderón 15,000,284, López Obrador 14,756,350, a difference of 243,934.

Election monitors from the European Union stated on 8 July that they found no irregularities that could have affected the transparency of the results and that could have impacted the results. Other election monitors found many examples of fraud and irregularities and demanded a full recount. See also: Controversies of the 2006 Mexican general election

Earlier media reports had indicated that in two separate incidents, one in Ciudad Nezahualcóyotl and one in Xalapa, used ballots and other electoral materials were found in rubbish dumps. Reforma later reported that this supposed electoral material was found to be photocopies and did not influence the election. Al Giordano, though, in a 8 July Narco News article, has a La Jornada photo of three completed color ballots found in a Mexico City trash can.

Candidate	Party	Votes	%
Felipe Calderón	National Action Party	15,000,284	36.69
Andrés Manuel López Obrador	Party of the Democratic Revolution	14,756,350	36.09
Roberto Madrazo	Institutional Revolutionary Party	9,301,441	22.75
Patricia Mercado	Social Democratic and Peasant Alternative Party	1,128,850	2.76
Roberto Campa Cifrián	New Alliance Party	401,804	0.98
Non-registered candidates		297,989	0.73
Total		40,886,718	100.00
Valid votes		40,886,718	97.84
Invalid/blank votes		904,604	2.16
Total votes		41,791,322	100.00
Registered voters/turnout		71,374,373	58.55
Source: IFES

==== By state ====
State	Calderón	López Obrador	Madrazo	Mercado	Campa	Write-in	None
Aguascalientes	193,588	89,920	97,935	16,275	5,597	3,335	7,669
Baja California	450,186	224,275	203,233	35,917	13,522	6,488	17,099
Baja California Sur	62,127	77,875	29,874	5,470	1,475	1,225	2,801
Campeche	99,526	101,192	87,412	4,756	8,470	1,652	9,514
Chiapas	215,358	551,749	427,351	15,065	7,378	8,395	47,327
Chihuahua	523,914	212,069	341,916	31,414	20,375	6,540	25,405
Coahuila	400,894	225,117	245,960	26,450	8,412	8,192	14,919
Colima	107,880	61,434	76,586	5,284	1,567	784	4,591
Distrito Federal	1,325,474	2,813,112	413,644	175,517	27,152	14,833	69,553
Durango	255,229	128,881	153,990	11,188	5,769	6,113	10,873
Guanajuato	1,155,403	301,463	368,789	49,753	18,611	17,136	49,896
Guerrero	160,253	510,217	263,035	16,809	10,493	7,132	24,172
Hidalgo	251,772	385,750	235,926	25,702	15,360	6,444	24,636
Jalisco	1,435,334	559,266	705,925	93,836	37,739	16,537	61,729
México	1,771,515	2,469,093	1,033,110	215,857	61,494	48,075	101,188
Michoacán	515,600	615,535	283,157	29,951	8,229	10,780	31,845
Morelos	226,340	312,815	111,118	24,736	12,129	6,901	15,062
Nayarit	69,097	152,999	123,284	7,730	3,840	1,919	6,978
Nuevo León	865,006	282,384	488,402	51,760	31,112	11,343	39,211
Oaxaca	226,304	620,062	428,026	19,482	5,620	7,672	42,017
Puebla	743,831	639,659	460,183	50,234	20,418	16,227	53,614
Querétaro	322,975	160,383	133,188	16,536	6,028	5,823	15,451
Quintana Roo	111,485	147,839	105,086	8,801	2,768	2,729	7,014
San Luis Potosí	462,329	204,983	207,602	23,648	8,360	7,470	37,332
Sinaloa	363,461	301,709	263,553	20,620	6,717	5,397	19,227
Sonora	468,288	240,114	175,365	23,187	6,914	3,724	16,345
Tabasco	31,975	512,743	344,526	4,261	1,906	1,582	14,120
Tamaulipas	506,177	324,491	317,849	25,025	12,424	15,853	24,103
Tlaxcala	140,128	180,487	59,672	11,130	3,426	6,504	8,883
Veracruz	1,006,676	1,036,474	727,638	55,971	17,777	25,396	72,412
Yucatán	364,353	125,152	260,116	12,962	4,504	6,784	15,284
Zacatecas	167,806	187,088	128,392	13,523	6,218	9,004	13,224
Total	15,000,284	14,756,350	9,301,441	1,128,850	401,804	297,989	904,604

=== Senate ===
Party or alliance		Party-list			Constituency			Total seats
Party or alliance		Votes	%	Seats	Votes	%	Seats	Total seats
National Action Party		14,035,503	34.47	11	13,889,159	34.39	41	52
Coalition for the Good of All	Party of the Democratic Revolution	12,397,008	30.45	6	12,292,512	30.44	20	26
Coalition for the Good of All	Labour Party	12,397,008	30.45	2	12,292,512	30.44	2	4
Coalition for the Good of All	Convergence	12,397,008	30.45	2	12,292,512	30.44	4	6
Coalition for the Good of All	Total	12,397,008	30.45	10	12,292,512	30.44	26	36
Alliance for Mexico	Institutional Revolutionary Party	11,681,395	28.69	6	11,622,012	28.78	27	33
Alliance for Mexico	Ecologist Green Party of Mexico	11,681,395	28.69	4	11,622,012	28.78	2	6
Alliance for Mexico	Total	11,681,395	28.69	10	11,622,012	28.78	29	39
New Alliance Party		1,688,198	4.15	1	1,677,033	4.15	0	1
Social Democratic and Peasant Alternative Party		795,730	1.95	0	787,425	1.95	0	0
Non-registered candidates		119,422	0.29	0	118,835	0.29	0	0
Total		40,717,256	100.00	32	40,386,976	100.00	96	128
Valid votes		40,717,256	97.55		40,386,976	97.54		
Invalid/blank votes		1,021,932	2.45		1,016,997	2.46		
Total votes		41,739,188	100.00		41,403,973	100.00		
Registered voters/turnout		71,374,373	58.48		71,374,373	58.01		
Source: INE

=== Chamber of Deputies ===
Party or alliance		Party-list			Constituency			Total seats
Party or alliance		Votes	%	Seats	Votes	%	Seats	Total seats
National Action Party		13,845,121	34.27	69	13,753,633	34.25	137	206
Coalition for the Good of All	Party of the Democratic Revolution	12,013,364	29.74	36	11,619,679	28.93	90	126
Coalition for the Good of All	Labour Party	12,013,364	29.74	13	11,619,679	28.93	3	16
Coalition for the Good of All	Convergence	12,013,364	29.74	11	11,619,679	28.93	5	16
Coalition for the Good of All	Total	12,013,364	29.74	60	11,619,679	28.93	98	158
Alliance for Mexico	Institutional Revolutionary Party	11,676,585	28.90	41	11,941,842	29.73	63	104
Alliance for Mexico	Ecologist Green Party of Mexico	11,676,585	28.90	17	11,941,842	29.73	2	19
Alliance for Mexico	Total	11,676,585	28.90	58	11,941,842	29.73	65	123
New Alliance Party		1,883,476	4.66	9	1,872,283	4.66	0	9
Social Democratic and Peasant Alternative Party		850,989	2.11	4	845,749	2.11	0	4
Non-registered candidates		128,825	0.32	0	128,347	0.32	0	0
Total		40,398,360	100.00	200	40,161,533	100.00	300	500
Valid votes		40,398,360	97.50		40,161,533	97.49		
Invalid/blank votes		1,037,574	2.50		1,033,665	2.51		
Total votes		41,435,934	100.00		41,195,198	100.00		
Registered voters/turnout		71,374,373	58.05		71,374,373	57.72		
Source: INE

== Aftermath ==
=== Demands for a recount ===
Soon after it was clear that the official count would result with Felipe Calderón ahead, Andrés Manuel López Obrador stated that he and his party, the PRD, would fight for a "vote-by-vote" general recount.

He presented nine boxes and 900 pages of supposed evidence alleging mathematical electoral irregularities in 50,000 polling places to the Federal Electoral Tribunal (TEPJF). In addition, he claimed that in areas with large numbers of López Obrador supporters, election officials nullified 900,000 votes.

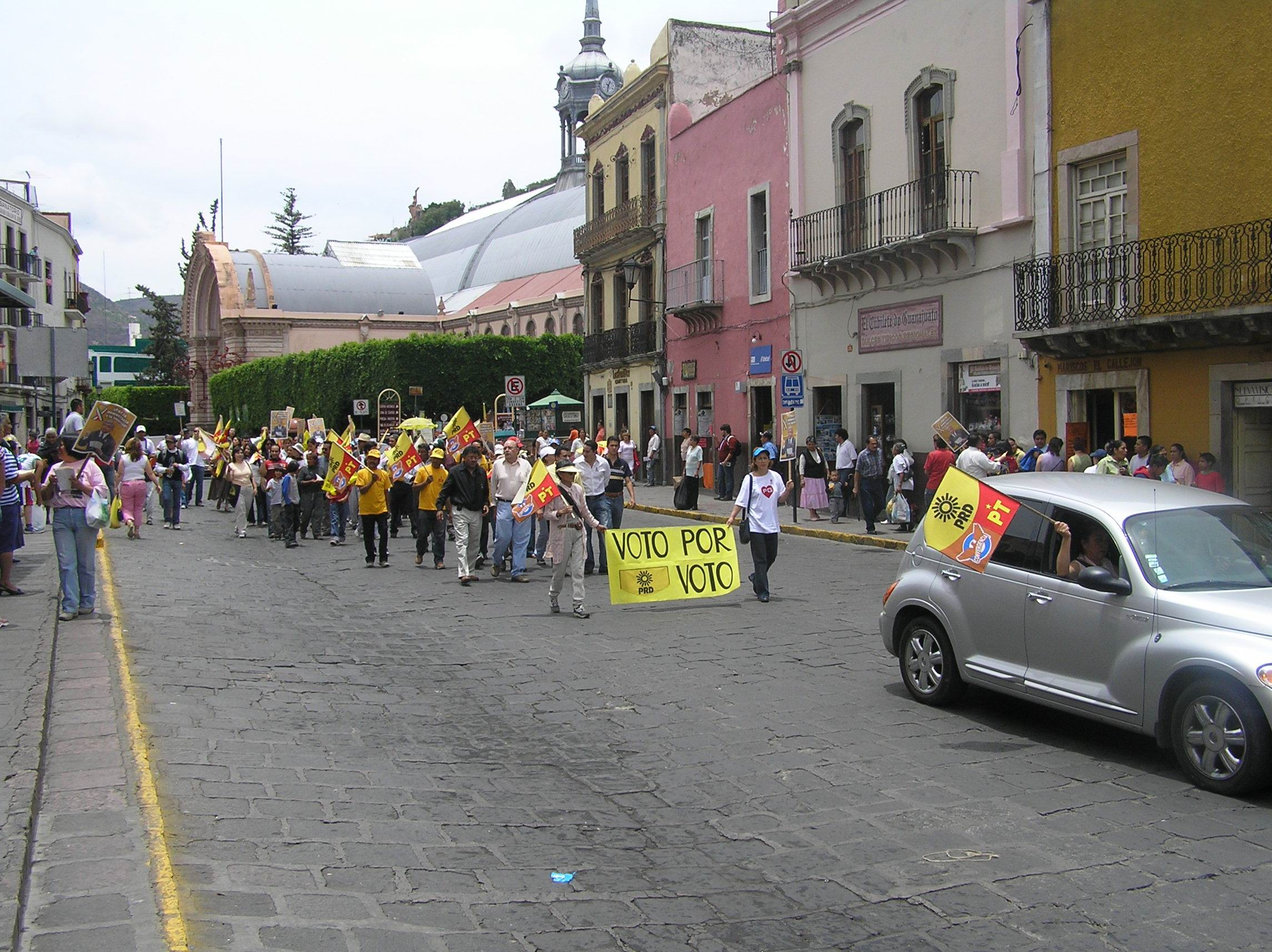
Supporters of López Obrador marching in Guanajuato

López Obrador and his supporters began organizing mass protests, marches, and civil disobedience, culminating in a massive rally in Mexico City's historic Zócalo on 30 July 2006. Estimates of the crowd at the rally range from 500,000 to 3,000,000 supporters. Additionally, López Obrador's campaign set up plantones, or encampments, inside the Zócalo and along Paseo de la Reforma, one of Mexico City's main arteries, for 47 days and slowing traffic for hours. The encampments were widely unpopular, as 65% of inhabitants in Mexico City opposed them.

On Saturday, 5 August, the TEPJF met in public session to decide the outcome of López Obrador's request for a recount. The seven magistrates voted unanimously that there was only sufficient legal justification to order the recount of 11,839 ballot boxes in 155 districts (9.2% of the total), thus rejecting López Obrador's public demand that all votes and ballot boxes be recounted. The Tribunal based its decision of a partial recount on its finding that, despite publicly demanding a vote by vote general recount, López Obrador's party only presented legal claims to less than 44,000 polling stations, or less than 34%. Therefore, legally, only those 44,000 polling stations were deemed controversial by the TEPJF. The Tribunal ruled that the non-controversial votes should not be recounted, because "the certainty asked by the Coalition (of López Obrador's party) is tied to the respect of the citizen counts in non-controversial polling stations". However, the Tribunal did certify that principles of certainty in the elections called for a justified recount in some of the controversial stations, as irregularities were found.

In the western state of Jalisco alone, 2,705 ballot boxes (33% of the state's total) will be recounted due to "evident mathematical errors". The state with the highest percentage of ballot boxes to be reopened is Aguascalientes with 436 or 35% of its 1,226 total ballot boxes. Other states with a high percentage of ballot boxes authorized to be opened include: Tamaulipas, 942 ballot boxes (or 23.7% of total ballot boxes); Campeche, 170 (18.3%); Chihuahua, 727 (15%); Durango, 344 (15.4%); Nuevo León, 508 (10%); San Luis Potosí, 495 (16%); Sinaloa, 334 (7.7%); Yucatán, 228 (10.5%); Zacatecas, 221 (9.23%); Querétaro, 9.4%.

States with small percentages include: Chiapas, 81 ballot boxes (1.6%); Distrito Federal, 227 (1.85%); Estado de México, 362 (2.33%); Michoacán, 300 (5.5%); Morelos, 124 (6%); Puebla, 194 (3.22%); Veracruz, 396 (6.56%); and Quintana Roo, 10 (0.8%).

The recount commenced on Wednesday, 9 August, (CBC) (VOA) and concluded on Sunday, 13 August. Only after calculating the recounted votes will the TEPJF declare the candidate with the most votes as president-elect.

On Friday, 11 August both disputing parties held press conferences, in which, despite the TEPJF's insistence that no recount results would be released until Sunday, each provided their own internal figures based on their observers in the recount. These figures clashed dramatically; according to the PAN, 75% of the votes had been recounted and the results confirmed that the initial count was "perfect", with fewer than three errors per ballot box and no systemic bias. (This is the message that most of the press reported, although others reported that the "75% without errors" figure was out of the completed, not the total, recount; still, the figures were hard to square with Coalition claims.) The Coalition claimed that only 60% of the recount was complete, and that in this recount their party had gained an average of 29 votes per ballot box. (Again, this was the message in most of the press, though other press outlets seemed to imply that the Coalition claims included lost or excess ballots as well as miscounted ones.).

On 28 August the TEPJF announced the results of the partial recount, subtracting 81,080 votes for Calderón, 76,897 votes for López Obrador, 63,114 for Roberto Madrazo, 5,962 for Patricia Mercado, 2,743 for Roberto Campa, and 7,940 for the remaining candidates. A total of 237,736 votes were annulled out of the approximately 4 million votes recounted. That means around 6% of the recounted votes were annulled.

Despite the Tribunal's ruling, and despite the ruling being based on his party's decision of not contesting all polls judicially, López Obrador continues to demand the "vote-by-vote" general recount, promising to continue civil disobedience and sit-ins. He was quoted as saying, "We don't want a portion of democracy. We want 100% democracy."

A day before the end of the recount, López Obrador's coalition threatened with national mobilizations to prevent the "imposition" of Calderón, if the PAN candidate was confirmed the winner of the election.

=== Calls for electoral reform ===
On Thursday November 23, 2006 the European Union (EU) election observer mission presented its final report. The report was generally positive and defended the official result of the July 2 presidential election saying they "reflect[ed] the legitimate will of the Mexican people." However, the report also expressed concerns and raised several criticisms, both general and specific, of the electoral process and the election. The report includes 48 specific recommendations for future reform to "strengthen the electoral process", such as introducing random automatic recounts in the case of a close election, shortening the campaign period, considering the introduction of a two round run-off system for presidential elections, and general clarifications in the electoral law (e.g., clarifying the grounds for requesting a recount and for the annulling of the election).

A 24 November 2006 article by The Herald Mexico reports: "All of Mexico's major parties have called for reforms to electoral laws, including clearer limits on funding, greater transparency on campaign spending and a shorter campaign period."

The article also stated "The EU mission, headed by Spanish Deputy José Ignacio Salafranca, said on Thursday that a runoff election would help the nation's electoral system, especially following results as close as this year's, when Felipe Calderón beat Andrés Manuel López Obrador by less than a percentage point. In a news conference, Salafranca said that while a second round would be expensive, it would give 'greater democratic legitimacy' to the result."

=== Subsequent political crisis ===
The high degree of controversy and polarization that resulted from this election gave way to a grave political crisis in Mexico throughout 2006. The elections were more controversial than those of 1988, and in a symbolic act, on 20 November López Obrador organized a ceremony to take office as the "Legitimate President of Mexico", followed by his sympathizers.

Calderón's inauguration ceremony on 1 December at the Congress of the Union was tense and lasted less than five minutes, as he barely managed to recite the oath of office while the PRD legislators shouted in protest against the alleged electoral fraud and attempted to impede his inauguration, and afterward he quickly left the building for security reasons as some of the legislators engaged in violent brawls. Besides the claims of fraud, Calderón took office with the smallest percentage of votes for a winning presidential candidate in Mexican history (35.8%), which meant that his administration would face severe legitimacy problems. Only a month after taking office, Calderón declared war on the drug cartels and organized crime, thus beginning the Mexican drug war. This was considered by many as an immediate strategy to gain popular legitimacy and acceptance for the new President after the convoluted elections.

=== Retrospective analysis ===
The 2006 elections remain a point of controversy and discussion. López Obrador, who ran for the presidency again in 2012 before finally winning the presidency on his third try in 2018, has always considered himself as the legitimate winner of this election even after all political parties, except Nueva Alianza, signed before members of the IFE on June 13, 2006 the Democratic Agreement for the Equality, Legality and Gobernability in which the main purpose was that everyone agree on a compromise to respect the election results.

Filmmaker Luis Mandoki produced a documentary titled "Fraude: México 2006", in which he chronicles many events of the second half of Vicente Fox's administration that led up to the heated 2006 election, and highlights the irregularities that took place during the process. The film has a duration of 110 minutes and topped the Mexican box office upon its 2007 debut.

In a 2011 opinion poll published by El País about whether the 2006 elections had been fraudulent, 49% of the respondents believed that the election was rigged, against 43% who believed it wasn't rigged and 8% who were unsure.

In 2017 PRI member and former governor of Coahuila, Humberto Moreira accused Calderón of "stealing the Presidency" in 2006. In October 2018, Roberto Madrazo, who was the 2006 PRI presidential candidate, stated in an interview that according to the data he received after the election, López Obrador had been the winner.

Mexican sociologist Jacqueline Peschard has identified the "breakdown in consensus that nearly resulted" because of this election as a major turning point in the history of Mexico as a functioning and legitimate liberal democracy.

In November 2026, Fox said in an interview with The Objective: "I made sure Calderón won, although it's not very democratic to say that, but I told myself that the country's leadership should remain in the hands of my party". Fox later said that his words had been taken out of context and that he referred that Calderón won because of "[Fox's] strong performance" as president.
