= LV Legislature of the Mexican Congress =

Legislature of the Congress of the Union

55th Congress (LV Legislatura)
←	54th	56th	→
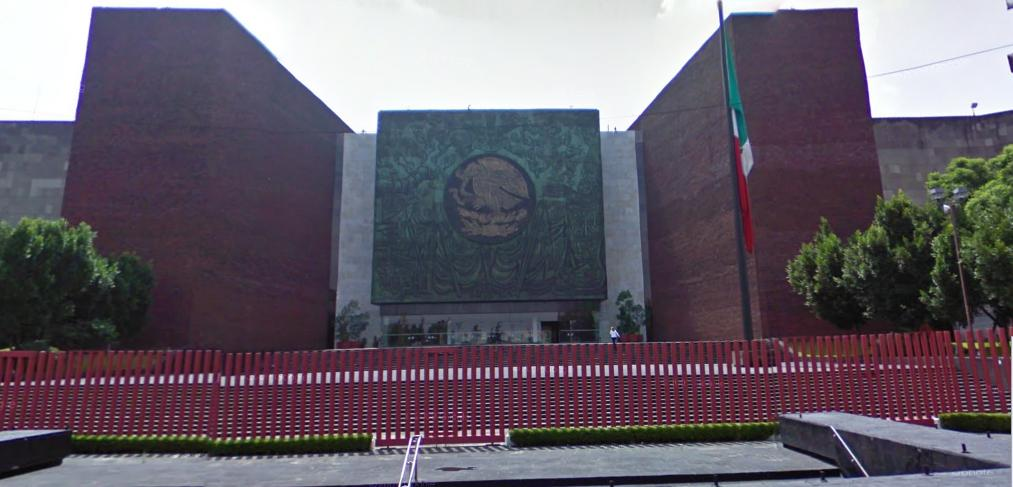
- Palacio Legislativo de San Lázaro

Overview
- Legislative body: Congress of the Union
- Meeting place: Palacio Legislativo de San Lázaro (Chamber of Deputies/Congress); Casona de Xicoténcatl (Senate)
- Term: 1 September 1991 – 31 August 1994
- Election: 18 August 1991

Senate of the Republic
- Members: 64

Chamber of Deputies
- Members: 500

The LV Legislature of the Congress of the Union of Mexico (55th Congress) met from 1 September 1991 to 31 August 1994.

32 senators and all of the deputies had been elected in the 1991 legislative elections. The deputies served three years and the senators six, continuing into the 56th Congress.

The PRI regained near-total control of the legislature, with nearly two-thirds of the deputies and all but three senators.

== Legislation ==
=== New Laws ===
First Year (1991-1992)

DOF Citation	Title	Votes		Signed by the executive	DOF Publication	Entry date	Active
DOF Citation	Title	Deputies	Senate	Signed by the executive	DOF Publication	Entry date	Active
DOF 29-06-1992	Ley de la Comisión Nacional de los Derechos Humanos	23 June 1992 (328-36)	11 June 1992 ()	25 June 1992	29 June 1992	30 June 1992	Yes
DOF 15-07-1992	Ley de Asociaciones Religiosas y Culto Público	7 July 1992 (328-36)	13 July 1992 (47-1)	14 July 1992	15 July 1992	16 July 1992	Yes
Repeals DOF 18-01-1927 (XXXII Legislature), DOF 30-12-1931 (XXXIV Legislature)
DOF 16-07-1992	Ley Orgánica de Petróleos Mexicanos y Organismos Subsidiarios	10 July 1992 (365-12)	13 July 1992 (47-1)	15 July 1992	16 July 1992	17 July 1992	No
Repeals DOF 06-02-1971 (XLVIII Legislature); Repealed by DOF 28-11-2008 (LX Legislature)

== Senate ==
=== By political party ===
Party	Senators
PAN	1
PRI	61
PRD	2

=== By federative entity ===
State	Senator	Party	State	Senator	Party
Aguascalientes	Héctor Hugo Olivares Ventura		Nayarit	Emilio M. González	
Aguascalientes	Jorge Rodríguez León		Nayarit	Salvador Sánchez Vázquez	
Baja California	César Moreno Martínez de Escobar; Alternate for Margarita Ortega Villa		Nuevo León	Alfonso Martínez Domínguez	
Baja California	Héctor Terán Terán		Nuevo León	María Elena Chapa Hernández	
Baja California Sur	Raúl Enrique Carrillo Silva		Oaxaca	Idolina Moguel Contreras	
Baja California Sur	Antonio Manríquez Guluarte		Oaxaca	Diódoro Carrasco Altamirano	
Campeche	Jorge Adolfo Vega Camacho		Puebla	Blas Chumacero	
Campeche	Carlos Sales Gutiérrez		Puebla	Germán Sierra Sánchez	
Chiapas	José Antonio Melgar Aranda		Querétaro	Ernesto Luque Feregrino	
Chiapas	Eduardo Robledo Rincón		Querétaro	Silvia Hernández	
Chihuahua	Saúl González Herrera		Quintana Roo	José Joaquín González Castro	
Chihuahua	Artemio Iglesias		Quintana Roo	José Epifanio Godoy Hernández; Alternate for Mario Villanueva Madrid	
Coahuila	Óscar Ramírez Mijares		San Luis Potosí	Carlos Jonguitud Barrios	
Coahuila	Alicia López de la Torre; Alternate for Rogelio Montemayor		San Luis Potosí	Carlos Jiménez Macías	
Colima	Roberto Ánzar Martínez		Sinaloa	Salvador Esquer Apodaca	
Colima	Ramón Serrano Ahumada		Sinaloa	Gustavo Guerrero Ramos	
Durango	Maximiliano Silerio Esparza		Sonora	Armando Hopkins Durazo; Alternate for Luis Donaldo Colosio	
Durango	Ángel Sergio Guerrero Mier		Sonora	Ramiro Valdés Fuentes	
Guanajuato	José de Jesús Padilla		Tabasco	Nicolás Reynés Berazaluce	
Guanajuato	Roberto Suárez Nieto		Tabasco	Manuel Gurría Ordóñez	
Guerrero	Netzahualcóyotl de la Vega		Tamaulipas	Ricardo Camero Cerdiel	
Guerrero	Rubén Figueroa Alcocer		Tamaulipas	Manuel Cavazos Lerma	
Hidalgo	Humberto Lugo Gil		Tlaxcala	Alberto Juárez Blancas	
Hidalgo	Jesús Murillo Karam		Tlaxcala	Ernesto García Sarmiento; Alternate for José Antonio Álvarez Lima	
Jalisco	Justino Delgado Caloca		Veracruz	Alger León Moreno	
Jalisco	José Luis Lamadrid Sauza		Veracruz	Miguel Alemán Velasco	
Estado de México	Leonardo Rodríguez Alcaine		Yucatán	José Nerio Torres Ortiz; Alternate for Dulce María Sauri Riancho	
Estado de México	Mauricio Valdés Rodríguez		Yucatán	Carlos Sobrino Sierra	
Michoacán	Roberto Robles Garnica		Zacatecas	Gustavo Salinas Íñiguez	
Michoacán	Víctor Manuel Tinoco Rubí		Zacatecas	Arturo Romo Gutiérrez	
Morelos	Jesús Rodríguez y Rodríguez		Distrito Federal	Porfirio Muñoz Ledo	
Morelos	Ángel Ventura Valle		Distrito Federal	Manuel Aguilera Gómez	

=== Parliamentary coordinators ===
- Partido Acción Nacional
  - Héctor Terán Terán
- Partido Revolucionario Institucional:
  - Netzahualcóyotl de la Vega
- Partido de la Revolución Democrática:
  - Porfirio Muñoz Ledo

== Chamber of Deputies ==
The Chamber of Deputies had 500 legislators, elected for three-year terms with no immediate reelection. 300 deputies were elected from single-member districts and the other 200 from party lists in each of the five proportional representation electoral regions.

=== Deputies by political party ===
Party	Deputies (SMD)	Deputies (PR)	Total Deputies
Partido Acción Nacional	11	78	89
Partido Revolucionario Institucional	289	31	320
Partido Popular Socialista	0	12	12
Partido Auténtico de la Revolución Mexicana	0	15	15
Partido del Frente Cardenista de Reconstrucción Nacional	0	23	23
Partido de la Revolución Democrática	0	41	41

=== Deputies from single-member districts ===
State	District	Deputy	Party	State	District	Deputy	Party
Aguascalientes	1	Armando Romero Rosales		México	16	Arturo Montiel Rojas	
Aguascalientes	2	Javier Rangel Hernández		México	17	Rodrigo Alejandro Nieto Enríquez	
Baja California	1	José Ramírez Román		México	18	Francisco Gárate Chapa	
Baja California	2	Jesús González Reyes		México	19	Enrique Edgardo Jacob Rocha	
Baja California	3	Rogelio Appel Chacón		México	20	Roberto Soto Prieto	
Baja California	4	Francisco Javier Cital Camacho		México	21	Javier Barrios González	
Baja California	5	Miguel Ernesto Enciso Clark		México	22	Rafael Gilberto Bernal Chávez	
Baja California	6	Carlos Tomás Esparza		México	23	Jaime Serrano Cedillo	
Baja California Sur	1	Yolanda Robinson Manríquez; Alternate for Guillermo Mercado Romero		México	24	Salomón Pérez Carrillo	
Baja California Sur	2	Mario Vargas Aguilar		México	25	José Benigno López Mateos	
Campeche	1	Luis Alberto Fuentes Mena		México	26	Luis Pérez Díaz	
Campeche	2	Francisco Puga Ramayo		México	27	Jorge René Flores y Solano	
Chiapas	1	Antonio García Sánchez		México	28	José Salinas Navarro	
Chiapas	2	Cuauhtémoc López Sánchez Coello		México	29	Ángel García Bravo	
Chiapas	3	Juan Carlos Bonifaz Trujillo		México	30	Sara Cruz Olvera	
Chiapas	4	Orbelín Rodríguez Velasco		México	31	Juan Adrián Ramírez García	
Chiapas	5	José Antonio Aguilar Bodegas		México	32	José Alfredo Torres Martínez	
Chiapas	6	Marlene Catalina Herrera Díaz		México	33	Miguel Bautista Cebada	
Chiapas	7	Jorge Flammarión Montesinos Melgar		México	34	Fidel González Ramírez	
Chiapas	8	Ricardo López Gómez		Michoacán	1	Jorge Mendoza Álvarez	
Chiapas	9	Octavio Elías Albores Cruz		Michoacán	2	Julián Rodríguez Sesmas	
Chihuahua	1	Fernandro Rodríguez Serna		Michoacán	3	José Jesús Gregorio Flores Alonzo	
Chihuahua	2	Edmundo Chacón Rodríguez		Michoacán	4	Efraín Zavala Cisneros; Alternate for Eduardo Villaseñor Peña	
Chihuahua	3	Carlos Morales Villalobos		Michoacán	5	Mariano Carreón Girón	
Chihuahua	4	Óscar René Nieto Burciaga		Michoacán	6	Anacleto Mendoza Maldonado	
Chihuahua	5	Pablo Israel Esparza Natividad		Michoacán	7	Hernán Virgilio Pineda Arellano	
Chihuahua	6	Jaime Ríos Velasco Grajeda		Michoacán	8	José Ascensión Orihuela Bárcenas	
Chihuahua	7	Socorro Eloy Gómez Pando		Michoacán	9	Jaime Calleja Andrade	
Chihuahua	8	José Luis Canales de la Vega		Michoacán	10	Carlos Ávila Figueroa	
Chihuahua	9	Luis Carlos Rentería Torres		Michoacán	11	Alfredo Anaya Gudiño	
Chihuahua	10	Israel Beltrán Montes		Michoacán	12	Medardo Méndez Alfaro	
Coahuila	1	Óscar González Pimentel		Michoacán	13	José Francisco Moreno Barragán	
Coahuila	2	Francisco José Dávila Rodríguez		Morelos	1	Rodolfo Becerril Straffon	
Coahuila	3	Fidel Hernández Puente		Morelos	2	Julio Gómez Herrera	
Coahuila	4	Jesús María Ramón Valdés		Morelos	3	Tomás Osorio Avilés	
Coahuila	5	Gaspar Valdez Valdez		Morelos	4	Felipe Ocampo Ocampo	
Coahuila	6	Irma Mayela Adame Aguayo; Alternate for Mariano López Mercado		Nayarit	1	Juan Alonso Romero; Alternate for Rigoberto Ochoa Zaragoza	
Coahuila	7	Javier Guerrero García		Nayarit	2	Víctor Joaquín Cánovas Moreno	
Colima	1	Rigoberto Salazar Velasco		Nayarit	3	José Ramón Navarro Quintero	
Colima	2	Graciela Larios Rivas		Nuevo León	1	José Rodolfo Treviño Salinas	
Distrito Federal	1	José Antonio Ruiz de la Herrán y Villagómez		Nuevo León	2	José de Jesús Basaldua González	
Distrito Federal	2	Rafael Farrera Peña		Nuevo León	3	Óscar Federico Herrera y Hosking	
Distrito Federal	3	Gloria Brasdefer Hernández		Nuevo León	4	Juan Morales Salinas	
Distrito Federal	4	Domingo Alapizco Jiménez		Nuevo León	5	Jaime Heliodoro Rodríguez Calderón	
Distrito Federal	5	Filiberto Paniagua García		Nuevo León	6	Arturo de la Garza González Junior	
Distrito Federal	6	Marco Antonio Fajardo Martínez		Nuevo León	7	Eloy Cantú Segovia	
Distrito Federal	7	Julio Alemán		Nuevo León	8	Gloria Josefina Mendiola Ochoa	
Distrito Federal	8	Fernando Lerdo de Tejada		Nuevo León	9	Erasmo Garza Elizondo	
Distrito Federal	9	Sandalio Alfonso Sáinz de la Maza Martínez		Nuevo León	10	Rogelio Villarreal Garza	
Distrito Federal	10	Manuel Solares Mendiola		Nuevo León	11	Andrés Silva Alvarado	
Distrito Federal	11	José Antonio González Fernández		Oaxaca	1	Porfirio Montero Funtes	
Distrito Federal	12	Roberto Castellano Tovar		Oaxaca	2	Vitalicio Cándido Coheto Martínez	
Distrito Federal	13	Aníbal Pacheco López		Oaxaca	3	Jorge Fernando Iturribarría Bolaños-Cacho	
Distrito Federal	14	José Guadalupe Rodríguez Rivera		Oaxaca	4	Antonio Sacre Ebrahim	
Distrito Federal	15	Armando Lazcano Montoya		Oaxaca	5	Armando David Palacios García	
Distrito Federal	16	Paloma Villaseñor Vargas		Oaxaca	6	Rafael Sergio Vera Cervantes	
Distrito Federal	17	Everardo Javier Garduño y Pérez		Oaxaca	7	Antonia Irma Piñeyro Arias	
Distrito Federal	18	Alfonso Godínez y López		Oaxaca	8	Nahum Ildefonso Zorrilla Cuevas	
Distrito Federal	19	Eduardo Francisco Trejo González		Oaxaca	9	Claudio Marino Guerra López	
Distrito Federal	20	Silvestre Fernández Barajas		Oaxaca	10	Francisco Felipe Ángel Villarreal	
Distrito Federal	21	Everardo Gámiz Fernández		Puebla	1	José Manuel Vera López	
Distrito Federal	22	Juan José Castillo Mota		Puebla	2	Rafael Cañedo Benítez	
Distrito Federal	23	Alfonso Rivera Domínguez		Puebla	3	Julieta Mendívil Blanco	
Distrito Federal	24	Alfredo Villegas Arreola		Puebla	4	Eleazar Camarillo Ochoa	
Distrito Federal	25	Alberto Nava Salgado		Puebla	5	José Porfirio Alarcón Hernández	
Distrito Federal	26	Alberto Célis Velasco		Puebla	6	Marco Antonio Haddad Yunes	
Distrito Federal	27	Silvia Pinal		Puebla	7	Melquíades Morales Flores	
Distrito Federal	28	Luis Salgado Beltrán		Puebla	8	Jaime Olivares Pedro	
Distrito Federal	29	Juan Moisés Calleja García		Puebla	9	Jorge René Sánchez Juárez	
Distrito Federal	30	Benjamín González Roaro		Puebla	10	Alberto Jiménez Arroyo	
Distrito Federal	31	Manuel Jiménez Guzmán		Puebla	11	Eduardo Cué Morán	
Distrito Federal	32	Rodolfo Echeverría Ruiz		Puebla	12	Guillermo Pacheco Pulido	
Distrito Federal	33	Victoria Reyes Reyes		Puebla	13	David Silencriario Montesino Marín	
Distrito Federal	34	Manuel Díaz Infante		Puebla	14	Jesús Saravia Ordóñez	
Distrito Federal	35	Manuel Monárrez Valenzuela		Querétaro	1	Fernando Ortiz Arana	
Distrito Federal	36	Felipe Muñoz		Querétaro	2	Gil Mendoza Pichardo	
Distrito Federal	37	Fernando Espino Arévalo		Querétaro	3	José Guadalupe Martínez Martínez	
Distrito Federal	38	Amado Treviño Abatte		Quintana Roo	1	Joaquín Hendricks Díaz	
Distrito Federal	39	Salvador Quintero Robles		Quintana Roo	2	Sonia Magaly Achach Solís	
Distrito Federal	40	José Merino Castrejón		San Luis Potosí	1	Alfredo Lujambio Rafols	
Durango	1	Armando Sergio González Santa Cruz		San Luis Potosí	2	Felipe Rodríguez Grimaldo	
Durango	2	José Miguel Castro Carrillo		San Luis Potosí	3	Jorge Vinicio Mejía Tobías	
Durango	3	Francisco Gamboa Herrera		San Luis Potosí	4	Jesús Mario del Valle Fernández	
Durango	4	Benjamín Ávila Guzmán		San Luis Potosí	5	Antonio Esper Bujaidar	
Durango	5	Gabriela Irma Avelar Villegas		San Luis Potosí	6	Horacio Sánchez Unzueta; Suplenrte a Enrique Rosales Morales	
Durango	6	Jesús Molina Lozano		San Luis Potosí	7	Felipe Aurelio Torres Torres	
Guanajuato	1	Francisco Arroyo Vieyra		Sinaloa	1	Jesús Octavio Falomir Hernández	
Guanajuato	2	Alejandro Gutiérrez de Velasco Ortiz		Sinaloa	2	Alberto López Vargas	
Guanajuato	3	Luis Arturo Bernabé Torres del Valle		Sinaloa	3	Humberto Gómez Campaña	
Guanajuato	4	Francisco Javier Alvarado Arreguín		Sinaloa	4	Juan S. Millán	
Guanajuato	5	Juvenal Medel		Sinaloa	5	Jesús Arnoldo Millán Trujillo	
Guanajuato	6	Ernesto Botello Martínez		Sinaloa	6	Manuel de Jesús Valdez Sánchez	
Guanajuato	7	Rafael Sánchez Leyva		Sinaloa	7	Miguel Sotelo Burgos	
Guanajuato	8	Mauricio Wolnitzer Clark y Ovadía		Sinaloa	8	Eduardo Cristerna González	
Guanajuato	9	Juan Ignacio Torres Landa		Sinaloa	9	Víctor Manuel Gandarilla Carrasco	
Guanajuato	10	José Azanza Jiménez		Sonora	1	Guillermo Hopkins Gámez	
Guanajuato	11	Luis Fernández Vega		Sonora	2	Ovidio Pereyra García	
Guanajuato	12	José Guadalupe Enríquez Magaña		Sonora	3	Julián Luzanilla Contreras	
Guanajuato	13	Martín Santos Gómez		Sonora	4	Arsenio Duarte Murrieta	
Guerrero	1	Florencio Salazar Adame		Sonora	5	Luis Moreno Bustamante	
Guerrero	2	Porfirio Camarena Castro		Sonora	6	Víctor Raúl Burton Trejo	
Guerrero	3	Hugo Arce Norato		Sonora	7	Miguel Ángel Murillo Aispuro	
Guerrero	4	Fernando Navarrete Magdaleno		Tabasco	1	Roberto Madrazo Pintado	
Guerrero	5	Juan José Castro Justo		Tabasco	2	Héctor Argüello López	
Guerrero	6	Ángel Aguirre Rivero		Tabasco	3	Mario Rubicel Ross García	
Guerrero	7	Gustavo Nabor Ojeda Delgado		Tabasco	4	Jesús Madrazo Martínez de Escobar	
Guerrero	8	Luis Taurino Jaime Castro		Tabasco	5	Gladys Ethel Guadalupe Cano Conde	
Guerrero	9	Efraín Zúñiga Galeana		Tamaulipas	1	Horacio Garza Garza	
Guerrero	10	Jesús Ramírez Guerrero		Tamaulipas	2	Óscar Luebbert Gutiérrez	
Hidalgo	1	María de la Luz Julieta Guevara Bautista		Tamaulipas	3	Tomás Yarrington	
Hidalgo	2	José Guadarrama Márquez		Tamaulipas	4	Laura Alicia Garza Galindo	
Hidalgo	3	José Ernesto Gil Elorduy		Tamaulipas	5	María del Carmen Bolado del Real	
Hidalgo	4	Joel Guerrero Juárez		Tamaulipas	6	Jesús Suárez Mata	
Hidalgo	5	Germán Corona del Rosal		Tamaulipas	7	Manuel Muñoz Rocha	
Hidalgo	6	Juan Carlos Alva Calderón		Tamaulipas	8	Hugo Andrés Araujo	
Jalisco	1	Jorge Leobardo Lepe García		Tamaulipas	9	Arturo Horacio Saavedra Sánchez	
Jalisco	2	Francisco Ruiz Guerrero		Tlaxcala	1	Héctor Ortiz Ortiz	
Jalisco	3	Adalberto Gómez Rodríguez		Tlaxcala	2	Álvaro Salazar Lozano	
Jalisco	4	José Alberto Cortés García		Veracruz	1	Gustavo Gámez Pérez	
Jalisco	5	Samuel Fernández Ávila		Veracruz	2	José Manuel Pozos Castro	
Jalisco	6	Juan Alfonso Serrano González		Veracruz	3	Edmundo Sosa López	
Jalisco	7	José Socorro Velázquez Hernández		Veracruz	4	Arturo Nájera Fuentes	
Jalisco	8	Eleazer Ayala Rodríguez		Veracruz	5	Celestino Manuel Ortiz Denetro	
Jalisco	9	Enrique Chavero Ocampo		Veracruz	6	Rubén Pabello Rojas	
Jalisco	10	Alejandro Ontiveros Gómez		Veracruz	7	Salvador Valencia Carmona	
Jalisco	11	Bertha Onésima González Rubio		Veracruz	8	Miguel Ángel Yunes Linares	
Jalisco	12	Rafael Gozález Pimienta		Veracruz	9	Isaías Álvaro Rodríguez Vivas	
Jalisco	13	Juan José Bañuelos Guardado		Veracruz	10	Juan Antonio Nemi Dib	
Jalisco	14	José Manuel Correa Ceseña		Veracruz	11	Guillermo Jorge González Díaz	
Jalisco	15	Raúl Juárez Valencia		Veracruz	12	Fidel Herrera Beltrán	
Jalisco	16	María Esther de Jesús Sherman Leaño		Veracruz	13	Jorge Uscanga Escobar	
Jalisco	17	Bernardo Gutiérrez Ochoa		Veracruz	14	Pablo Pavón Vinales	
Jalisco	18	Alfredo Barba Hernández		Veracruz	15	Fernando Arturo Charleston Salinas	
Jalisco	19	Jesús Núñez Regalado		Veracruz	16	Guillermo Díaz Rea	
Jalisco	20	Jesús Enrique Ramos Flores		Veracruz	17	Rufino Saucedo Márquez	
México	1	Fernando Roberto Ordorica Pérez		Veracruz	18	Juan Bustillos Montalvo	
México	2	Eduardo Lencanda y Lujambio		Veracruz	19	Froylán Ramírez Lara	
México	3	Armando Neira Chávez		Veracruz	20	Ignacia García López	
México	4	Laura Hermelinda Pavón Jaramillo		Veracruz	21	Ramón Ferrari Pardiño	
México	5	Pablo Gómez Monroy		Veracruz	22	Gustavo Carvajal Moreno	
México	6	Luis Cuauhtémoc Riojas Guajardo		Veracruz	23	Luis Alberto Beauregard Rivas	
México	7	María Estela Cásares Esquibel		Yucatán	1	Luis Correa Mena	
México	8	Roberto Ruiz Ángeles		Yucatán	2	Fernando Romero Ayuso	
México	9	Moisés Armenta Vega		Yucatán	3	José Feliciano Moo y Can	
México	10	Cupertino Juárez Gutiérrez		Yucatán	4	José Ignacio Mendicuti Pavón	
México	11	Rafael Maldonado Villafuerte		Zacatecas	1	José Marco Antonio Olvera Acevedo	
México	12	Pablo Casas Jaime		Zacatecas	2	José Eulogio Bonilla	
México	13	Antonio Huitrón Vera		Zacatecas	3	Pedro de León Sánchez	
México	14	Amador Monroy Estrada		Zacatecas	4	Celestino Tobanche Alonso	
México	15	Felipe Medina Santos		Zacatecas	5	José Escobedo Domínguez	

=== Presidents of the Head Commission of the Chamber of Deputies ===
- (1991 - 1993): Fernando Ortiz Arana
- (1993 - 1994): María de los Ángeles Moreno

=== Parliamentary coordinators ===
- Partido Acción Nacional:
  - (1991 - 1993): Diego Fernández de Cevallos
  - (1993 - 1994): Gabriel Jiménez Remus
- Partido Revolucionario Institucional :
- Partido de la Revolución Democrática:

Preceded by LIV Legislature	LV Legislature; 1991 to 1994	Succeeded by LVI Legislature
