= LII Legislature of the Mexican Congress =

52nd Congress (LII Legislatura)
←	51st	53rd	→
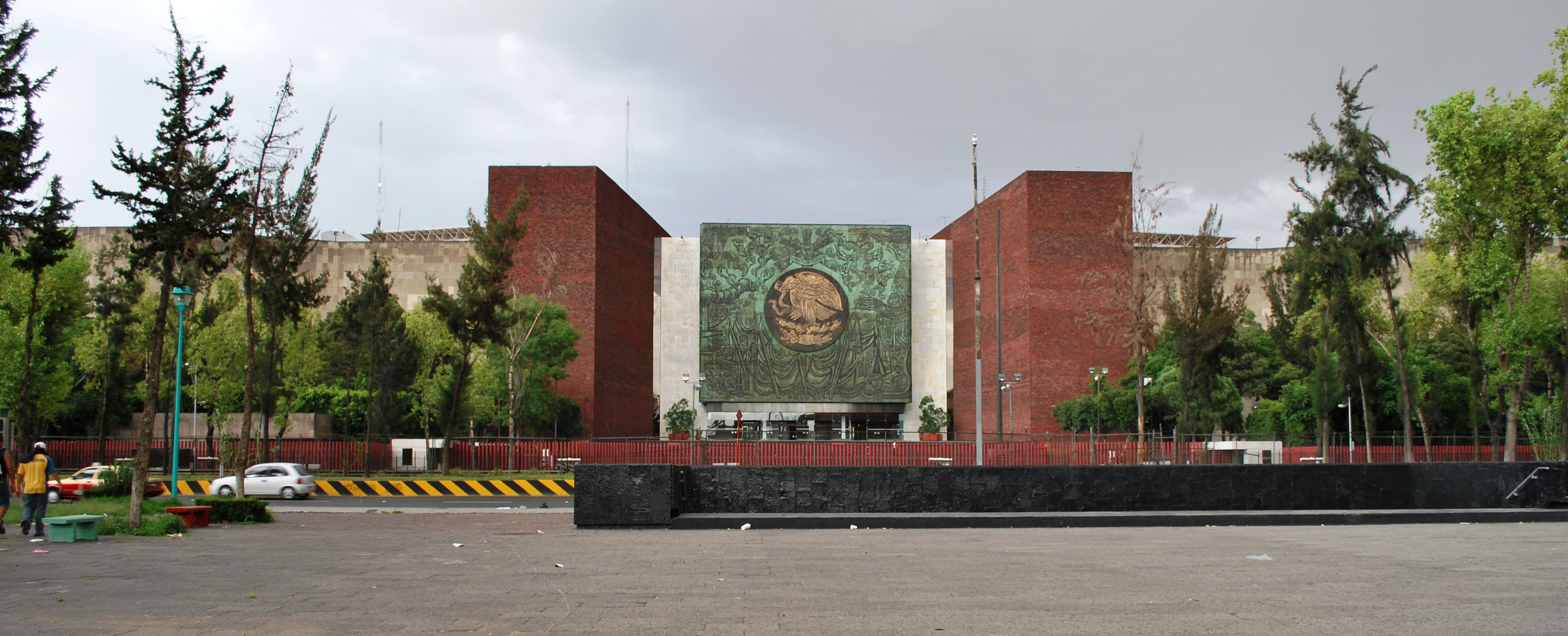
- Legislative Palace of San Lázaro

Overview
- Term: 1 September 1982 – 31 August 1985

Senate
- Members: 64 senators

Chamber of Deputies
- Members: 400 deputies

The LII Legislature of the Congress of the Union, the 52nd session of the Congress of Mexico, met from 1 September 1982 to 31 August 1985 in the newly inaugurated Legislative Palace of San Lázaro. The members of both chambers – 64 senators and 400 deputies – were elected in the general election held on 4 July 1982.

On its first day of sessions, the 52nd Congress heard the sixth and final State of the Nation report of President José López Portillo in which, amidst a massive economic and currency crisis, he announced the nationalization of the country's private banks and imposed stringent exchange controls.

== Senate ==
In the 4 July general election, two senators were elected from each state, plus two from the Federal District, for a total of 64.

	Party	Senators
centrado	Partido Revolucionario Institucional	64

=== Senators by state ===
State	Senator	Party	State	Senator	Party
Aguascalientes	Roberto Casillas Hernández		Nayarit	Rigoberto Ochoa Zaragoza	
Aguascalientes	Andrés A. Valdivia		Nayarit	Celso Humberto Delgado	
Baja California	Alfonso Garzón Santibáñez		Nuevo León	Raúl Caballero Escamilla	
Baja California	Carmen Márquez Jiménez		Nuevo León	Raúl Salinas Lozano	
Baja California Sur	Armando Trasviña Taylor		Oaxaca	Heladio Ramírez López	
Baja California Sur	Guillermo Mercado Romero		Oaxaca	Andrés Henestrosa	
Campeche	Rafael Armando Herrera Morales		Puebla	Alfonso Zegbe Sanen	
Campeche	Renato Sales Gasque		Puebla	Ángel Aceves Saucedo	
Chiapas	Patrocinio González Garrido		Querétaro	N/D; Alternate of Mariano Palacios Alcocer	
Chiapas	Manuel Villafuerte Mijangos		Querétaro	Silvia Hernández Enríquez	
Chihuahua	Diamantina Reyes Esparza (Note: Diamantina Reyes Esparza was sworn in on 3 September 1984 following the death of José Refugio Mar de la Rosa on 5 August.); Alternate of José Refugio Mar de la Rosa		Quintana Roo	Alberto Villanueva Sansores	
Chihuahua	José Socorro Salcido Gómez		Quintana Roo	Miguel Borge Martín	
Coahuila	Raúl Castellano Jiménez		San Luis Potosí	Gonzalo Martínez Corbalá	
Coahuila	Francisco José Madero González		San Luis Potosí	José Antonio Padilla Segura	
Colima	Alberto Javier Ahumada Padilla		Sinaloa	Ernesto Millán Escalante	
Colima	Socorro Díaz Palacios		Sinaloa	Juan S. Millán	
Durango	Miguel González Avelar		Sonora	Fernando Mendoza Contreras	
Durango	José Ramírez Gamero		Sonora	Alejandro Sobarzo Loaiza; Alternate of Jorge Díaz Serrano	
Guanajuato	Guadalupe Rivera Marín; Alternate of Agustín Téllez Cruces		Tabasco	Humberto Hernández Haddad	
Guanajuato	Gilberto Muñoz Mosqueda		Tabasco	Salvador Neme Castillo	
Guerrero	Guadalupe Gómez Maganda Bermeo		Tamaulipas	Salvador Barragán Camacho	
Guerrero	Filiberto Viguera Lázaro		Tamaulipas	Américo Villarreal Guerra	
Hidalgo	Adolfo Lugo Verduzco		Tlaxcala	Faustino Alba Zavala	
Hidalgo	Luis José Dorantes Segovia		Tlaxcala	Héctor Vázquez Paredes	
Jalisco	Heliodoro Hernández Loza		Veracruz	Mario Hernández Posadas	
Jalisco	Ramón Martínez Martín		Veracruz	Manuel Ramos Gurrión	
Estado de México	Yolanda Sentíes Echeverría		Yucatán	Víctor Manzanilla Schaffer	
Estado de México	Héctor Jarquín Hernández		Yucatán	Myrna Esther Hoyos Schlamme	
Michoacán	Antonio Martínez Báez		Zacatecas	Arturo Romo Gutiérrez	
Michoacán	Norberto Mora Plancarte		Zacatecas	Rafael Cervantes Acuña	
Morelos	Antonio Riva Palacio López		Distrito Federal	Hugo B. Margáin	
Morelos	Gonzalo Pastrana Castro		Distrito Federal	Abraham Martínez Rivero	

== Chamber of Deputies ==
The 4 July election returned 400 members of the Chamber of Deputies: 300 from single-member constituencies and 100 from party lists in four electoral regions:

Party	Deputies
Partido Acción Nacional	51
Partido Revolucionario Institucional	299
Partido Popular Socialista	10
Partido Demócrata Mexicano	12
Partido Socialista de los Trabajadores	11
Partido Socialista Unificado de México	17
Total	400

=== Deputies from single-member districts ===
State	District	Deputy	Party	State	District	Deputy	Party
Aguascalientes	1	Heriberto Vázquez Becerra		México	16	Arturo Martínez Legorreta	
Aguascalientes	2	Héctor Hugo Olivares Ventura		México	17	Apolinar de la Cruz Loreto	
Baja California	1	José Ignacio Monge Rangel		México	18	José Armando Gordillo Mandujano	
Baja California	2	Martiniano Valdez Escobedo		México	19	Ernesto Andonegui Luna	
Baja California	3	José Luis Castro Verduzco		México	20	José Ruiz González	
Baja California	4	Gilberto Gutiérrez Banaga		México	21	Hugo Díaz Thomé	
Baja California	5	Leonor Rosales Rodríguez		México	22	José Luis García García	
Baja California	6	Leopoldo Durán Rentería		México	23	Juan de Dios Salazar Salazar	
Baja California Sur	1	Jesús Murillo Aguilar		México	24	José Lucio Ramírez Ornelas	
Baja California Sur	2	Alberto Miranda Castro		México	25	Juan Herrera Servín	
Campeche	1	Jorge Dzib Sotelo		México	26	Leonardo González Valera	
Campeche	2	Abelardo Carrillo Zavala		México	27	Carlos Barrios Honey	
Chiapas	1	Enoch Cansino Casahonda		México	28	Alfonso Gaytán Esquivel	
Chiapas	2	Areli Madrid Tovilla		México	29	Eleazar García Rodríguez	
Chiapas	3	Homero Tovilla Cristiani		México	30	Guillermo Fragoso Martínez	
Chiapas	4	Oralia Coutiño Ruiz		México	31	Enrique Riva Palacio Galicia	
Chiapas	5	Faustino Roos Mazo		México	32	Raúl Vélez García	
Chiapas	6	Humberto Pulido García		México	33	Manuel Nogal Elorza	
Chiapas	7	Sami David David		México	34	María Elisa Alvarado Carrillo	
Chiapas	8	Germán Jiménez Gómez		Michoacán	1	Francisco Javier Ovando Hernández	
Chiapas	9	Eloy Morales Espinosa		Michoacán	2	Jorge Canedo Vargas	
Chihuahua	1	Miguel Ángel Acosta Ramos		Michoacán	3	Raúl Lemus García	
Chihuahua	2	Alfonso Cereceros Peña		Michoacán	4	Hermenegildo Anguiano Martínez	
Chihuahua	3	Enrique Soto Izquierdo		Michoacán	5	Guillermo Villa Ávila	
Chihuahua	4	Francisco Rodríguez Pérez		Michoacán	6	Rubén Vargas Martínez	
Chihuahua	5	Samuel Díaz Olguín		Michoacán	7	Cristóbal Arias Solís	
Chihuahua	6	Diógenes Bustamante Vela		Michoacán	8	Ignacio Olvera Quintero	
Chihuahua	7	Juan Manuel Terrazas Sánchez		Michoacán	9	Juan Villegas Torres	
Chihuahua	8	Dora Villegas Nájera		Michoacán	10	Eulalio Ramos Valladolid	
Chihuahua	9	Servando Portillo Díaz		Michoacán	11	Armando Octavio Ballinas Mayés	
Chihuahua	10	Miguel Olea Enríquez		Michoacán	12	José Cervantes Acosta	
Coahuila	1	Abraham Cepeda Izaguirre		Michoacán	13	María Antonia Vázquez Segura	
Coahuila	2	Víctor González Avelar		Morelos	1	N/D; Alternate of Juan Salgado Brito	
Coahuila	3	Enrique Neavez Muñiz		Morelos	2	Heladio Gutiérrez Ortega	
Coahuila	4	Lucio Lozano Ramírez		Morelos	3	Lorenzo García Solís	
Coahuila	5	Óscar Ramírez Mijares		Morelos	4	Emma Victoria Campos Figueroa	
Coahuila	6	Enrique Agüero Ávalos		Nayarit	1	Antonio Pérez Peña	
Coahuila	7	Juan A. García Guerrero		Nayarit	2	Ignacio González Barragán	
Colima	1	Humberto Silva Ochoa		Nayarit	3	Juan Medina Cervantes	
Colima	2	Ramón Serrano García		Nuevo León	1	Alberto Santos de Hoyos	
Distrito Federal	1	Pedro Luis Bartilotti Perea		Nuevo León	2	Juventino González Ramos	
Distrito Federal	2	Rodolfo García Pérez		Nuevo León	3	Carlota Vargas Garza	
Distrito Federal	3	Carlos Jiménez Macías		Nuevo León	4	Homero Ayala Torres	
Distrito Federal	4	Domingo Alapizco Jiménez		Nuevo León	5	Eleazar Bazaldua Bazaldua	
Distrito Federal	5	Carlos Jiménez Lizardi; Alternate of Miguel Ángel Morado Garrido		Nuevo León	6	N/D; Alternate of Jorge Treviño Martínez	
Distrito Federal	6	Venustiano Reyes López		Nuevo León	7	Ricardo Cavazos Galván	
Distrito Federal	7	José de Jesús Fernández Alatorre		Nuevo León	8	Antonio Medina Ojeda	
Distrito Federal	8	Juan Saldaña Rosell		Nuevo León	9	Alejandro Lambretón Narro	
Distrito Federal	9	Arturo Contreras Cuevas		Nuevo León	10	Luis Eugenio Todd	
Distrito Federal	10	Manuel Osante López		Nuevo León	11	Guillermo Garza Luna	
Distrito Federal	11	Enrique León Martínez		Oaxaca	1	Raúl Enríquez Palomec	
Distrito Federal	12	Wulfrano Leyva Salas		Oaxaca	2	Demetrio Meixueiro Siguenza	
Distrito Federal	13	Hilda Anderson Nevárez		Oaxaca	3	María Encarnación Paz Méndez	
Distrito Federal	14	Álvaro Brito Alonso		Oaxaca	4	Odila Torres Ávila	
Distrito Federal	15	Juan José Osorio Palacios		Oaxaca	5	Luis Martínez Fernández del Campo	
Distrito Federal	16	José Aguilar Alcérreca		Oaxaca	6	Jorge Luis Chávez Zárate	
Distrito Federal	17	Guillermo Dávila Martínez		Oaxaca	7	Antonio Fabila Meléndez	
Distrito Federal	18	Joaquín del Olmo Reyes		Oaxaca	8	Pedro Salinas Guzmán	
Distrito Federal	19	Sara Villalpando Núñez		Oaxaca	9	Serafín Aguilar Franco	
Distrito Federal	20	Mateo de Regil Rodríguez		Oaxaca	10	Joseph Stephan Acar	
Distrito Federal	21	Everardo Gámiz Fernández		Puebla	1	Hilda Luisa Valdemar Lima	
Distrito Federal	22	José Carreño Carlón		Puebla	2	Guillermo Pacheco Pulido	
Distrito Federal	23	Servio Tulio Acuña		Puebla	3	Efraín Trujeque Martínez	
Distrito Federal	24	Daniel Belanzario Díaz		Puebla	4	Lino García Gutiérrez	
Distrito Federal	25	Jesús Salazar Toledano		Puebla	5	Olegario Valencia Portillo	
Distrito Federal	26	Ignacio Cuauhtémoc Paleta		Puebla	6	Wulfrano Ascensión Bravo	
Distrito Federal	27	Xóchitl Llarena del Rosario		Puebla	7	Isabel Serdán Álvarez	
Distrito Federal	28	Antonio Osorio León		Puebla	8	Jaime Alcántara Silva	
Distrito Federal	29	Manuel Álvarez González		Puebla	9	Luis Aguilar Cerón	
Distrito Federal	30	Esteban Núñez Perea		Puebla	10	Mariano Piña Olaya	
Distrito Federal	31	María L. Calzada de Campos		Puebla	11	Javier Bolaños Vázquez	
Distrito Federal	32	Luz Lajous Vargas		Puebla	12	Manuel R. Villa Issa	
Distrito Federal	33	José Parcero López		Puebla	13	Víctor Manuel Carreto Fernández de Lara	
Distrito Federal	34	Netzahualcóyotl de la Vega		Puebla	14	Sacramento Joffre Vázquez	
Distrito Federal	35	Armida Martínez Valdez		Querétaro	1	Angélica Paulín Posada	
Distrito Federal	36	Armando Corona Boza		Querétaro	2	Ramón Ordaz Almaraz	
Distrito Federal	37	Alfonso Valdivia Ruvalcaba		Querétaro	3	Ernesto Luque Feregrino	
Distrito Federal	38	Alejandro Posadas Espinosa		Quintana Roo	1	Sara Muza Simón	
Distrito Federal	39	Alicia Perla Sánchez Lazcano		Quintana Roo	2	Javier Sánchez Lozano	
Distrito Federal	40	Norma Silvia López Cano Aveleyra		San Luis Potosí	1	Víctor Alfonso Maldonado Moreleón	
Durango	1	Zina Ruiz de León		San Luis Potosí	2	José Guadalupe Vega Macías	
Durango	2	Jesús Ibarra Reyes		San Luis Potosí	3	Odilón Martínez Rodríguez	
Durango	3	María Albertina Barbosa Espinoza		San Luis Potosí	4	Gerardo Ramos Romo	
Durango	4	Maximiliano Silerio Esparza		San Luis Potosí	5	Eusebio Ordaz Ortiz	
Durango	5	Juan Arizmendi Hernández		San Luis Potosí	6	Leopoldino Ortiz Santos	
Durango	6	Cirino Olvera Espinoza		San Luis Potosí	7	Helios Barragán López	
Guanajuato	1	Enrique Fernández Martínez Arce		Sinaloa	1	Ángel Sandoval Romero	
Guanajuato	2	Carlos Machiavelo Marín		Sinaloa	2	Homobono Rosas Rodríguez	
Guanajuato	3	Juan Valera Mayorga		Sinaloa	3	Jesús Manuel Viedas Esquerra	
Guanajuato	4	Luis Vaquera García		Sinaloa	4	Germinal Arámburo Cristerna	
Guanajuato	5	Rubén García Farías		Sinaloa	5	Rafael Oceguera Ramos	
Guanajuato	6	Javier Martínez Aguilera		Sinaloa	6	Juan Rodolfo López Monroy	
Guanajuato	7	Álvaro Uribe Salas		Sinaloa	7	Maclovio Osuna Balderrama	
Guanajuato	8	Luis Dantón Rodríguez		Sinaloa	8	Saúl Ríos Beltrán	
Guanajuato	9	Salvador Rocha Díaz		Sinaloa	9	Manuel Tarriba Rojo	
Guanajuato	10	Ausencio Astudillo Bello		Sonora	1	Luis Héctor Ochoa Bercini	
Guanajuato	11	Rodolfo Padilla Padilla		Sonora	2	Alfonso Molina Ruibal	
Guanajuato	12	Sergio Lara Espinoza		Sonora	3	Florentino López Tapia	
Guanajuato	13	José Luis Caballero Cárdenas		Sonora	4	Manlio Fabio Beltrones	
Guerrero	1	Zotico García Pastrana		Sonora	5	Ricardo Castillo Peralta	
Guerrero	2	José Martínez Morales		Sonora	6	Rubén Castro Ojeda	
Guerrero	3	Rafael Armenta Ortiz		Sonora	7	Ramiro Valdez Fontes	
Guerrero	4	Rosa Martha Muñuzuri		Tabasco	1	Amador Izundegui Rullán	
Guerrero	5	Mario González Navarro		Tabasco	2	Oscar Cantón Zetina	
Guerrero	6	Adrián Mayoral Bracamontes		Tabasco	3	Andrés Sánchez Solís	
Guerrero	7	Eloy Polanco Salinas		Tabasco	4	Manuel Llergo Heredía	
Guerrero	8	Luis Taurino Jaime Castro		Tabasco	5	Griselda García Serra	
Guerrero	9	Efraín Zúñiga Galeana		Tamaulipas	1	Ascensión Martínez Cavazos	
Guerrero	10	Rubén Pérez Espino		Tamaulipas	2	Federico Hernández Cortez	
Hidalgo	1	Juan Mariano Acoltzin V.		Tamaulipas	3	Heriberto Batres García	
Hidalgo	2	Julieta Guevara Bautista		Tamaulipas	4	Abdón Martínez Hinojosa	
Hidalgo	3	César Humberto Vieyra Salgado		Tamaulipas	5	Roberto González Barba	
Hidalgo	4	Onof re Hernández Rivera		Tamaulipas	6	Benito Ignacio Santamaría Sánchez	
Hidalgo	5	Humberto Lugo Gil		Tamaulipas	7	Mario Santos Gómez	
Hidalgo	6	Antonio Ramírez Herrera		Tamaulipas	8	Manuel Cavazos Lerma	
Jalisco	1	José Luis Lamadrid Sauza		Tamaulipas	9	Martha Chávez Padrón	
Jalisco	2	Ramiro Plascencia Loza		Tlaxcala	1	José Antonio Álvarez Lima	
Jalisco	3	José Luis Peña Loza		Tlaxcala	2	Alma Gracía de Zamora	
Jalisco	4	María del Carmen Mercado Chávez		Veracruz	1	Antonio Murrieta Necoechea	
Jalisco	5	Leopoldo Hernández Partida		Veracruz	2	Rogelio Carballo Millán	
Jalisco	6	Luis Garfias Magaña		Veracruz	3	Mauro Melo Barrios	
Jalisco	7	José Rosas Gómez Luna		Veracruz	4	Edmundo Martínez Zaleta	
Jalisco	8	Sergio M. Beas Pérez		Veracruz	5	Alfonso Arroyo Flores	
Jalisco	9	Bertha Lenia Hernández de Ruvalcaba		Veracruz	6	Salvador Valencia Carmona	
Jalisco	10	Francisco Galindo Musa		Veracruz	7	Servando Díaz Suárez	
Jalisco	11	Víctor Manuel Torres Ramírez		Veracruz	8	José Nassar Tenorio	
Jalisco	12	Aide Villalobos Rivera		Veracruz	9	Daniel Sierra Rivera	
Jalisco	13	Oralia Viramontes de la Mora		Veracruz	10	Jorge Minvielle Porte Petit	
Jalisco	14	José Luis Martínez Rodríguez		Veracruz	11	Mario Vargas Saldaña	
Jalisco	15	Héctor Manuel Perfecto Rodríguez		Veracruz	12	Irma Cué de Duarte	
Jalisco	16	Héctor Ixtláhuac Gaspar		Veracruz	13	Celso Vázquez Ramírez	
Jalisco	17	Nicolás Orozco Ramírez		Veracruz	14	Wilfrido Martínez Gómez	
Jalisco	18	Alfredo Barba Hernández		Veracruz	15	Carlos Brito Gómez	
Jalisco	19	Oscar Chacón Iñiguez	cecntrado	Veracruz	16	Héctor Sánchez Ponce	
Jalisco	20	Rafael García Sancho		Veracruz	17	Elpidia Excelente Azuara	
México	1	Roberto Ruiz Delgado		Veracruz	18	Silverio Alvarado Alvarado	
México	2	Gerardo Cavazos Cortés		Veracruz	19	Seth Cardeña Luna; Alternate of Roque Spinoso Foglia (Note: Roque Spinosa Foglia was murdered on 25 November 1984.)	
México	3	Hugo Díaz Velázquez		Veracruz	20	Ramón Ojeda Mestre	
México	4	Irma Zárate Pineda		Veracruz	21	Amador Toca Cangas	
México	5	Antonio Vélez Torres		Veracruz	22	Serafín Domínguez Fermán	
México	6	Guillermo Vargas Alarcón		Veracruz	23	Manuel Solares Mendiola	
México	7	Luis René Martínez Souverville Rivera		Yucatán	1	Herbé Rodríguez Abraham; Alternate of Víctor Cervera Pacheco	
México	8	Gustavo Pérez y Pérez		Yucatán	2	José Pacheco Durán	
México	9	Moisés Raúl López Laines		Yucatán	3	Rubén Calderón Cecilio	
México	10	Josefina Luévano Romo		Yucatán	4	Dulce María Sauri Riancho	
México	11	Luis Mayén Ruiz		Zacatecas	1	Genaro Borrego Estrada	
México	12	Maurilio Hernández González		Zacatecas	2	Antonio Herrera Bocardo	
México	13	Miguel Ángel Sáenz Garza		Zacatecas	3	Roberto Castillo Aguilar	
México	14	Martín Téllez Salazar		Zacatecas	4	Jesús Ortiz Herrera	
México	15	Gildardo Herrera Gómez Tagle		Zacatecas	5	Ana María Maldonado Pineda	
Source: Legislatura 52, Cámara de Diputados

=== Proportional representation deputies ===
For the 1982 election, the country was divided into four electoral regions (circunscripciones electorales), with each returning 25 deputies.

1st region: Federal District, Hidalgo, Morelos, Puebla, San Luis Potosí, Tlaxcala
2nd region: Chihuahua, Coahuila, Durango, Guanajuato, State of Mexico, Querétaro, Zacatecas
3rd region: Campeche, Chiapas, Nuevo León, Oaxaca, Quintana Roo, Tabasco, Tamaulipas, Veracruz, Yucatán
4th region: Aguascalientes, Baja California, Baja California Sur, Colima, Guerrero, Jalisco, Michoacán, Nayarit, Sinaloa, Sonora

Electoral region	Deputy	Party	Electoral region	Deputy	Party
First	José González Torres	Partido Acción Nacional	Third	Luis J. Prieto	Partido Acción Nacional
First	Bernardo Bátiz	Partido Acción Nacional	Third	Roger Cicero Mac-Kinney	Partido Acción Nacional
First	Juan Vázquez Garza	Partido Acción Nacional	Third	Ángel Mora López	Partido Acción Nacional
First	Gerardo Medina Valdez	Partido Acción Nacional	Third	Rubén Darío Méndez Aquino	Partido Acción Nacional
First	Marco Antonio Fragoso Fragoso	Partido Acción Nacional	Third	Fabián Basaldúa Vázquez	Partido Acción Nacional
First	Manuel Iguiniz González	Partido Acción Nacional	Third	Paulino Aguilar Paniagua	Partido Acción Nacional
First	José Viramontes Paredes	Partido Acción Nacional	Third	Arnoldo Gáfate Chapa	Partido Acción Nacional
First	José Alberto Ling Altamirano	Partido Acción Nacional	Third	Miguel Gómez Guerrero	Partido Acción Nacional
First	Juan José Hinojosa Hinojosa	Partido Acción Nacional	Third	José Hadad Interian	Partido Acción Nacional
First	Francisco Javier González Garza	Partido Acción Nacional	Third	Manuel Zamora y Duque de Estrada	Partido Acción Nacional
First	Arturo Trujillo Parada	Partido Acción Nacional	Third	Felipe Gutiérrez Zorrilla	Partido Acción Nacional
First	Javier Blanco Sánchez	Partido Acción Nacional	Third	Jorge Cruickshank García	Partido Popular Socialista (México)
First	Francisco Ortiz Mendoza	Partido Popular Socialista (México)	Third	Viterbo Cortez Lobato	Partido Popular Socialista (México)
First	Jesús Luján Gutiérrez	Partido Popular Socialista (México)	Third	Juan Gualberto Campos Vega	Partido Popular Socialista (México)
First	David Orozco Romo	Partido Demócrata Mexicano	Third	Sergio Ruiz Pérez	Partido Popular Socialista (México)
First	Baltazar Ignacio Valadez Montoya	Partido Demócrata Mexicano	Third	Margarito Benítez Durán	Partido Demócrata Mexicano
First	David Lomelí Contreras	Partido Demócrata Mexicano	Third	Francisco Álvarez de la Fuente	Partido Demócrata Mexicano
First	Iván García Solís	Partido Socialista Unificado de México	Third	Ma. de Jesús Orta Mata	Partido Demócrata Mexicano
First	Rolando Cordera Campos	Partido Socialista Unificado de México	Third	José Encarnación Pérez Gaytán	Partido Socialista Unificado de México
First	Salvador Castañeda O'Connor	Partido Socialista Unificado de México	Third	Héctor Sánchez López	Partido Socialista Unificado de México
First	Antonio Gershenson	Partido Socialista Unificado de México	Third	Pedro Bonilla Díaz De la Vega	Partido Socialista Unificado de México
First	Arnaldo Córdova	Partido Socialista Unificado de México	Third	Cándido Díaz Cerecedo	Partido Socialista de los Trabajadores (México)
First	Rafael Aguilar Talamantes	Partido Socialista de los Trabajadores (México)	Third	Ricardo Antonio Govela Autrey	Partido Socialista de los Trabajadores (México)
First	Raúl López García	Partido Socialista de los Trabajadores (México)	Third	César Humberto González Magallón	Partido Socialista de los Trabajadores (México)
First	Mariano López Ramos	Partido Socialista de los Trabajadores (México)	Third	Pablo Sánchez Puga	Partido Socialista de los Trabajadores (México)
Second	Teresa Ortuño Gurza	Partido Acción Nacional	Fourth	Jesús Salvador Larios Ibarra	Partido Acción Nacional
Second	Astolfo Vicencio Tovar	Partido Acción Nacional	Fourth	Alfonso Méndez Ramírez	Partido Acción Nacional
Second	Francisco Soto Alba	Partido Acción Nacional	Fourth	Rodolfo Peña Farber	Partido Acción Nacional
Second	Carlos Chavira Becerra	Partido Acción Nacional	Fourth	Miguel Ángel Martínez Cruz	Partido Acción Nacional
Second	Alberto González Domene	Partido Acción Nacional	Fourth	Javier Moctezuma y Coronado	Partido Acción Nacional
Second	Luis Torres Serranía	Partido Acción Nacional	Fourth	Gabriel Salgado Aguilar	Partido Acción Nacional
Second	Jaime Armando de Lara Tamayo	Partido Acción Nacional	Fourth	Juan Millán Brito	Partido Acción Nacional
Second	J. Isabel Villegas Piña	Partido Acción Nacional	Fourth	Juan Manuel Molina Rodríguez	Partido Acción Nacional
Second	Emma Medina Valtierra	Partido Acción Nacional	Fourth	José Guadalupe Esparza López	Partido Acción Nacional
Second	Gustavo Arturo Vicencio Acevedo	Partido Acción Nacional	Fourth	Pablo Castillón Álvarez	Partido Acción Nacional
Second	Esperanza Espinosa Herrera	Partido Acción Nacional	Fourth	Andrés Cásarez Camacho	Partido Acción Nacional
Second	Salvador Romero Estrada	Partido Acción Nacional	Fourth	Florentina Villalobos Chaparro	Partido Acción Nacional
Second	Luis Enrique Sánchez Espinoza	Partido Acción Nacional	Fourth	Francisco Calderón Ortiz	Partido Acción Nacional
Second	Graciela Gutiérrez de Barrios	Partido Acción Nacional	Fourth	Crescencio Morales Orozco	Partido Popular Socialista (México)
Second	Héctor Ramírez Cuéllar	Partido Popular Socialista (México)	Fourth	Sergio Quiroz Miranda	Partido Popular Socialista (México)
Second	Alfredo Reyes Contreras	Partido Popular Socialista (México)	Fourth	Enrique Alcántar Enríquez	Partido Demócrata Mexicano
Second	José Augusto García Lizama	Partido Demócrata Mexicano	Fourth	Ignacio Vital Jáuregui	Partido Demócrata Mexicano
Second	Juan López Martínez	Partido Demócrata Mexicano	Fourth	Raymundo León Ozuna	Partido Demócrata Mexicano
Second	Ofelia Ramírez Sánchez	Partido Demócrata Mexicano	Fourth	Raúl Rea Carvajal	Partido Socialista Unificado de México
Second	José Dolores López Domínguez	Partido Socialista Unificado de México	Fourth	Samuel Meléndres Luévano	Partido Socialista Unificado de México
Second	Edmundo Jardón Arzate	Partido Socialista Unificado de México	Fourth	Daniel Ángel Sánchez Pérez	Partido Socialista Unificado de México
Second	Víctor González Rodríguez	Partido Socialista Unificado de México	Fourth	Florentino Jaimes Hernández	Partido Socialista Unificado de México
Second	René Rojas Ayala	Partido Socialista Unificado de México	Fourth	Jesús Lazcano Ochoa	Partido Socialista Unificado de México
Second	Antonio Ortega Martínez	Partido Socialista de los Trabajadores (México)	Fourth	Domingo Esquivel Rodríguez	Partido Socialista de los Trabajadores (México)
Second	Ignacio Moreno Garduño	Partido Socialista de los Trabajadores (México)	Fourth	Alberto Salgado Salgado	Partido Socialista de los Trabajadores (México)
Source: Legislatura 52, Cámara de Diputados
