= LI Legislature of the Mexican Congress =

51st Congress (LI Legislatura)
←	50th	52nd	→

Overview
- Legislative body: Congress of the Union
- Term: 1 September 1979 – 31 August 1982
- Election: 1 July 1979

Senate of the Republic
- Members: 64

Chamber of Deputies
- Members: 400

The LI Legislature of the Congress of the Union (LI Legislatura del Congreso de la Unión) was the 51st session of the Congress of Mexico. It sat from 1 September 1979 to 31 August 1982.

The session's senators had been elected in the 1976 general election while the deputies were elected in the 1979 mid-term election.

It marked a watershed in that it was the first congress elected after the 1977 political reforms, under which several parties on the left and the right obtained official registration and access to Congress by opposition parties (i.e. those other than the hegemonic Institutional Revolutionary Party) was made much more viable. The session's members included the first deputies from the Mexican Communist Party (PCM), the Workers' Socialist Party (PST) and the Mexican Democratic Party (PDM). The reforms also increased the number of deputies: 300 from single-member constituencies and 100 from regional lists.

== Senate ==
The 1976 general election had elected two senators for each state and the Federal District – a total of 64 – to serve six-year terms. They were in office for the 50th and 51st sessions of Congress (1976–1982).

=== Party strengths ===
Party	Senators
Institutional Revolutionary Party	63
Popular Socialist Party	1

=== Senators ===
State	Senator	Party	State	Senator	Party
Aguascalientes	Roberto Díaz Rodríguez; Substitute for Rodolfo Landeros Gallegos (Note: Landeros Gallegos requested a leave of absence from his Senate seat to contend for the governorship of Aguascalientes.)		Nayarit	Leobardo Ramos Martínez	
Aguascalientes	Héctor Hugo Olivares Ventura		Nayarit	Daniel Espinoza Galindo	
Baja California	Rafael García Vázquez; Substitute for Roberto de la Madrid Romandía (Note: De la Madrid Romandía requested a leave of absence from his Senate seat to serve, first, as the director-general of the National Lottery and, second, as the governor of Baja California.)		Nuevo León	Napoleón Gómez Sada	
Baja California	Óscar Baylón Chacón; Substitute for Celestino Salcedo Monteón (Note: Salcedo Monteón requested a leave of absence from his Senate seat upon his appointment as the director-general of the Fondo Nacional de Fomento Ejidal.)		Nuevo León	Adrián Yáñez Martínez	
Baja California Sur	Prisca Melgar Sánchez; Substitute for Alberto Alvarado Arámburo		Oaxaca	Rodolfo Alaves Flores; Substitute for Eliseo Jiménez Ruiz	
Baja California Sur	Víctor Manuel Liceaga Ruibal; Substitute for Marcelo Rubio Ruiz (Note: Rubio Ruiz died in office on 6 January 1977.)		Oaxaca	Jorge Cruickshank García	
Campeche	Rosa María Martínez Denegri; Substitute for Carlos Sansores Pérez (Note: Sansores Pérez resigned his Senate seat upon his appointment as director-general of the ISSSTE.)		Puebla	Horacio Labastida Muñoz	
Campeche	Joaquín Repetto Ocampo; Substitute for Fernando Rafful Miguel (Note: Rafful Miguel left his Senate seat to head the Department of Fisheries.)		Puebla	Blas Chumacero Sánchez	
Chiapas	Salomón González Blanco		Querétaro	César Rubén Hernández Enríquez; Substitute for Rafael Camacho Guzmán	
Chiapas	Horacio Castellanos Coutiño		Querétaro	Telésforo Trejo Uribe; Substitute for Manuel González Cosío y Rivera	
Chihuahua	Santiago Nieto Sandoval; Substitute for Óscar Ornelas Küchle		Quintana Roo	Vicente Coral Martínez	
Chihuahua	Mario Carballo Pazos		Quintana Roo	Hernán Pastrana Pastrana; Substitute for José Blanco Peyrefitte	
Coahuila	Eliseo Mendoza Berrueto		San Luis Potosí	Rafael Tristán López	
Coahuila	Gustavo Guerra Castaños		San Luis Potosí	Fausto Zapata Loredo	
Colima	Aquileo Díaz Virgen; Substitute for Griselda Álvarez Ponce de León (Note: Álvarez Ponce de León requested a leave of absence from her seat to take office as governor of Colima.)		Sinaloa	Hilda Anderson Nevárez	
Colima	Antonio Salazar y Salazar		Sinaloa	Gilberto Ruiz Almada	
Durango	Ignacio Castillo Mena		Sonora	Juan José Gastelum García	
Durango	Tomás Rangel Perales		Sonora	Adolfo de la Huerta Oriol	
Guanajuato	Euquerio Guerrero López		Tabasco	Antonio Ocampo Ramírez; Substitute for David Gustavo Gutiérrez Ruiz (Note: Gutiérrez Ruiz requested a leave of absence to head Fertilizantes Mexicanos (FERTIMEX).)	
Guanajuato	Jesús Cabrera Muñoz Ledo		Tabasco	Nicolás Reynés Berazaluce; Substitute for Carlos Pellicer Cámara (Note: Pellicer died in office on 16 February 1977.)	
Guerrero	Luis León Aponte; Substitute for Jorge Soberón Acevedo		Tamaulipas	Morelos Jaime Canseco González	
Guerrero	Rubén Uriza Castro; Substitute for Alejandro Cervantes Delgado		Tamaulipas	Martha Chávez Padrón	
Hidalgo	Humberto Lugo Gil		Tlaxcala	Jesús Hernández Rojas	
Hidalgo	Vacant		Tlaxcala	Rafael Minor Franco	
Jalisco	José María Martínez Rodríguez		Veracruz	Silverio Ricardo Alvarado	
Jalisco	Arnulfo Villaseñor Saavedra		Veracruz	Sergio Martínez Mendoza	
State of Mexico	Leonardo Rodríguez Alcaine		Yucatán	Víctor Cervera Pacheco	
State of Mexico	Roberto Serrano Herrera		Yucatán	Martín García Lizama; Substitute for Graciliano Alpuche Pinzón	
Michoacán	José Luis Escobar Herrera; Substitute for Cuauhtémoc Cárdenas Solórzano (Note: Cárdenas Solórzano requested a leave of absence to serve at the Secretariat of Agriculture, Ranching and Rural Development and then to take office as the governor of Michoacán.)		Zacatecas	Jorge Gabriel García Rojas	
Michoacán	Guillermo Morfín García		Zacatecas	Pedro de León; Substitute for José Guadalupe Cervantes Corona	
Morelos	Ángel Ventura Valle		Federal District	Luis del Toro Calero; Substitute for Hugo Cervantes del Río (Note: Cervantes del Río requested a leave of absence to serve as director-general of the Federal Electricity Commission.)	
Morelos	Javier Rondero Zubieta		Federal District	Joaquín Gamboa Pascoe	

=== President of the Senate ===
1976–1982: Joaquín Gamboa Pascoe

== Chamber of Deputies ==
The 51st Congress was elected in the July 1979 mid-term election following the 1977 political reforms: the number of single-member constituencies was increased to 300 (from 196 in the 50th Congress), the proportional representation system was expanded to 100 seats (compared to 41 in the 50th Congress), and three parties obtained their first deputies: the Mexican Communist Party (PCM), the Workers' Socialist Party (PST) and the Mexican Democratic Party (PDM).

=== Deputies by party ===
Party	Single-member districts	Proportional representation	Total
Institutional Revolutionary Party	296	0	296
National Action Party	4	39	43
Mexican Communist Party	0	18	18
Authentic Party of the Mexican Revolution	0	12	12
Popular Socialist Party	0	11	11
Mexican Democratic Party	0	10	10
Workers' Socialist Party	0	10	10
Total	300	100	400

=== Deputies elected in single-member constituencies ===
State	District	Deputy	Party	State	District	Deputy	Party
Aguascalientes	1st	Roberto Díaz Rodríguez		Mexico	16th	Yolanda Sentíes Echeverría	
Aguascalientes	2nd	Gilberto Romo Nájera		Mexico	17th	Fernando Barrera Velázquez	
Baja California	1st	José Luis Andrade Ibarra		Mexico	18th	Enrique Jacob Soriano	
Baja California	2nd	Juan Villalpando Cuevas		Mexico	19th	Humberto Lira Mora	
Baja California	3rd	Luis Ayala García		Mexico	20th	José Antonio Rivas Roa	
Baja California	4th	Rodolfo Fierro Márquez		Mexico	21st	Alfredo Navarrete Romero	
Baja California	5th	Carmen Márquez Jiménez		Mexico	22nd	María Elena Prado Mercado	
Baja California	6th	Rafael García Vázquez		Mexico	23rd	Juan Alvarado Jacco	
Baja California Sur	1st	Armando Trasviña Taylor		Mexico	24th	Francisco Javier Gaxiola Ochoa	
Baja California Sur	2nd	Ramón Ojeda Suárez		Mexico	25th	Leonel Domínguez Rivero	
Campeche	1st	Rafael Armando Herrera Morales		Mexico	26th	Elba Esther Gordillo	
Campeche	2nd	José Edilberto Vázquez Ríos		Mexico	27th	Ignacio Pichardo Pagaza	
Chiapas	1st	Rafael Pascacio Gamboa Cano		Mexico	28th	Odón Madariaga Cruz	
Chiapas	2nd	Pedro Pablo Zepeda Bermúdez		Mexico	29th	Fernando Riva Palacio Inestrillas	
Chiapas	3rd	Leyver Martínez González		Mexico	30th	Vicente Coss Ramírez	
Chiapas	4th	Salvador de la Torre Grajales		Mexico	31	Manuel Moreno Toscano	
Chiapas	5th	Jaime Coutiño Esquinca		Michoacán	1st	Marco Antonio Aguilar Cortés	
Chiapas	6th	Alberto Ramón Cerdio Bado		Michoacán	2nd	José Luis Lemus Solís	
Chiapas	7th	Antonio Cueto Citalán		Michoacán	3rd	Norberto Mora Plancarte	
Chiapas	8th	Alberto Cuesy Balboa; Substitute for Juan Sabines Gutiérrez		Michoacán	4th	Humberto Romero Pérez	
Chiapas	9th	César Augusto Santiago		Michoacán	5th	Javier Zepeda Romero	
Chihuahua	1st	Margarita Moreno Mena		Michoacán	6th	Rafael Ruiz Béjar	
Chihuahua	2nd	Jesús Chávez Baeza		Michoacán	7th	Raúl Pineda Pineda	
Chihuahua	3rd	René Franco Barreno		Michoacán	8th	Luis Coq Guichard	
Chihuahua	4th	Miguel Lerma Candelaria		Michoacán	9th	Alfonso Quintero Larios	
Chihuahua	5th	Enrique Pérez González		Michoacán	10th	Genovevo Figueroa Zamudio	
Chihuahua	6th	Enrique Sánchez Silva		Michoacán	11th	Leticia Amezcua Gudiño	
Chihuahua	7th	Demetrio Bernardo Franco Derma		Michoacán	12th	Abimael López Castillo	
Chihuahua	8th	Mario Legarreta Hernández		Michoacán	13th	José Luis González Aguilera	
Chihuahua	9th	Rebeca Anchondo Fernández		Morelos	1st	David Jiménez González	
Chihuahua	10th	Alfonso Jesús Armendáriz Durán		Morelos	2nd	Francisco Pliego Nava	
Coahuila	1st	Jorge Masso Masso		Morelos	3rd	Gonzalo Pastrana Castro	
Coahuila	2nd	Juan Antonio García Villa		Morelos	4th	Lauro Ortega Martínez	
Coahuila	3rd	Rafael Ibarra Chacón (Note: Took his seat on 22 December 1979 after the election of 1 July in the district was annulled.)		Nayarit	1st	Alberto Tapia Carrillo	
Coahuila	4th	Ángel López Padilla		Nayarit	2nd	Emilio M. González	
Coahuila	5th	Conrado Martínez Ortiz		Nayarit	3rd	Carlos Serafín Ramírez	
Coahuila	6th	Francisco José Madero González		Nuevo León	1st	Fernando Canales Clariond	
Coahuila	7th	Lorenzo García Zárate		Nuevo León	2nd	Juan Carlos Camacho Salinas	
Colima	1st	Agustín González Villalobos		Nuevo León	3rd	Luis Medina Peña	
Colima	2nd	Arnoldo Ochoa González		Nuevo León	4th	Filiberto Villarreal Ayala	
Federal District	1st	Carlos Duffo López		Nuevo León	5th	José Fuad González Amille	
Federal District	2nd	Ángel Olivo Solís		Nuevo León	6th	Luis M. Farías	
Federal District	3rd	Hugo Domenzáin Guzmán		Nuevo León	7th	Andrés Montemayor Hernández	
Federal District	4th	Rodolfo Siller Rodríguez		Nuevo León	8th	Francisco Valero Sánchez	
Federal District	5th	Juan Araiza Cabrales		Nuevo León	9th	Amparo Aguirre Hernández	
Federal District	6th	Daniel Mejía Colín		Nuevo León	10th	Adalberto Núñez Galaviz	
Federal District	7th	David Reynoso		Nuevo León	11th	Armando Thomae Serna	
Federal District	8th	Lidia Camarena Adame		Oaxaca	1st	José Murat Casab	
Federal District	9th	Gonzalo Castellot Madrazo		Oaxaca	2nd	Leandro Martínez Machuca	
Federal District	10th	Ignacio Zúñiga González		Oaxaca	3rd	Eleazar Santiago Cruz	
Federal District	11th	Manuel Germán Parra y Prado		Oaxaca	4th	Rosalino Porfirio López Ortiz	
Federal District	12th	Roberto Castellanos Tovar		Oaxaca	5th	Genoveva Medina Esteva	
Federal District	13th	Joel Ayala Almeida		Oaxaca	6th	Election annulled	
Federal District	14th	Eduardo Rosas González		Oaxaca	7th	Aurelio Mora Contreras	
Federal District	15th	José Herrera Arango		Oaxaca	8th	Norberto Aguirre Palancares	
Federal District	16th	Jorge Flores Vizcarra		Oaxaca	9th	Rubén Darío Somuano López	
Federal District	17th	Rubén Figueroa Alcocer		Oaxaca	10th	Ignacio Villanueva Vázquez	
Federal District	18th	Leobardo Salgado Arroyo		Puebla	1st	Ángel Aceves Saucedo	
Federal District	19th	Francisco Simeano y Chávez		Puebla	2nd	Victoriano Álvarez García	
Federal District	20th	Ricardo Castañeda Gutiérrez		Puebla	3rd	Election annulled	
Federal District	21st	Enrique Gómez Corchado		Puebla	4th	Eleazar Camarillo Ochoa	
Federal District	22nd	Enrique González Flores		Puebla	5th	Juan Bonilla Luna	
Federal District	23rd	Cuauhtémoc de Anda Gutiérrez		Puebla	6th	Amador Hernández González	
Federal District	24th	Carlos Robles Loustaunau		Puebla	7th	Elizabeth Rodríguez Muñoz	
Federal District	25th	María Eugenia Moreno Gómez		Puebla	8th	Guillermo Melgarejo Palafox	
Federal District	26th	Marcos Medina Ríos		Puebla	9th	Constantino Sánchez Romano	
Federal District	27th	Humberto Rodolfo Olguín		Puebla	10th	Alfonso Zegbe Sanen	
Federal District	28th	Carlos Romero Deschamps		Puebla	11th	Guillermo Jiménez Morales	
Federal District	29th	Isabel Vivanco Montalvo		Puebla	12th	Franscisco Sánchez Díaz de Rivera	
Federal District	30th	Roberto Blanco Moheno		Puebla	13th	Rodolfo Alvarado Hernández	
Federal District	31st	Ofelia Casillas Ontiveros		Puebla	14th	Melquiades Morales Flores	
Federal District	32nd	Joaquín Álvarez Ordóñez		Querétaro	1st	Fernando Ortiz Arana	
Federal District	33rd	Miguel Ángel Camposeco		Querétaro	2nd	Federico Flores Tavares	
Federal District	34th	Carlos Hidalgo Cortés		Querétaro	3rd	Rodolfo Luis Monroy Sandoval	
Federal District	35th	Arturo Robles Aparicio		Querétaro	1st	Fernando Ortiz Arana	
Federal District	36th	Consuelo Velázquez Torres		Querétaro	2nd	Federico Flores Tavares	
Federal District	37th	Luis Velázquez Jaacks		Querétaro	3rd	Rodolfo Luis Monroy Sandoval	
Federal District	38th	Tristán Canales		Quintana Roo	1st	Salvador Ramos Bustamante; Substitute for Pedro Joaquín Coldwell	
Federal District	39th	Antonio Carrillo Flores		Quintana Roo	2nd	Primitivo Alonso Alcocer	
Federal District	40th	Mario Alfonso Berumen Ramírez		San Luis Potosí	1st	Antonio Rocha Cordero	
Durango	1st	Ángel Tejeda Espino		San Luis Potosí	2nd	Antonio Sandoval González	
Durango	2nd	Eduardo López Faudoa		San Luis Potosí	3rd	José Refugio Aráujo del Ángel	
Durango	3rd	Rogelio Sánchez Huerta; Substitute for Armando del Castillo Franco		San Luis Potosí	4th	Ángel Martínez Manzanares	
Durango	4th	Miguel Ángel Fragoso Álvarez		San Luis Potosí	5th	Bonifacio Fernández Padilla	
Durango	5th	Gonzalo Salas Rodríguez		San Luis Potosí	6th	Guillermo Medina de los Santos	
Durango	6th	Praxedis Nevárez Zepeda		San Luis Potosí	7th	José Ramón Martell	
Guanajuato	1st	Rafael Corrales Ayala		Sinaloa	1st	Salvado Ezqueda Apodaca	
Guanajuato	2nd	Rafael Hernández Ortiz		Sinaloa	2nd	Francisco Alarcón Fregoso	
Guanajuato	3rd	Juan Rojas Moreno		Sinaloa	3rd	Jesús Enrique Hernández Chávez	
Guanajuato	4th	Martín Aureliano Montaño Arteaga		Sinaloa	4th	Héctor Enrique González Guevara	
Guanajuato	5th	Jorge Martínez Domínguez		Sinaloa	5th	Palemón Bojórquez Atondo	
Guanajuato	6th	Gilberto Muñoz Mosqueda		Sinaloa	6th	Fortino Gómez Mac Hattón	
Guanajuato	7th	Ignacio Vázquez Torres		Sinaloa	7th	Baldomero López Arias	
Guanajuato	8th	Ofelia Ruiz Vega		Sinaloa	8th	María del Rosario Hernández Barrón	
Guanajuato	9th	Guadalupe Rivera Marín		Sinaloa	9th	Juan Carlos de Saracho Calderón	
Guanajuato	10th	Guillermo González Aguado		Sonora	1st	Luis Antonio Bojórquez Serrano	
Guanajuato	11th	Gabriel Appelt Harald		Sonora	2nd	Alejandro Sobarzo Loaiza	
Guanajuato	12th	Raúl Moreno Mújica		Sonora	3rd	Hugo Romero Ojeda	
Guanajuato	13th	Enrique Betanzos Hernández		Sonora	4th	Rubén Duarte Corral	
Guerrero	1st	Herón Varela Alvarado		Sonora	5th	Salomón Faz Sánchez	
Guerrero	2nd	Porfirio Camarena Castro		Sonora	6th	Fernando Mendoza Contreras	
Guerrero	3rd	Aristeo Roque Jaimes Núñez		Sonora	7th	Carlos Amaya Rivera	
Guerrero	4th	Guadalupe Gómez Maganda Bermeo		Tabasco	1st	Ángel Augusto Buendía Tirado	
Guerrero	5th	Election annulled		Tabasco	2nd	Ángel Mario Martínez Zentella	
Guerrero	6th	Israel Martínez Galeana		Tabasco	3rd	Carlos Mario Piñera Rueda	
Guerrero	7th	Jorge Montúfar Araujo		Tabasco	4th	Humberto Hernández Haddad	
Guerrero	8th	Filiberto Vigueras Lázaro		Tabasco	5th	Hernán Rabelo Wade	
Guerrero	9th	José María Serna Maciel		Tamaulipas	1st	Pedro Pérez Ibarra	
Guerrero	10th	Dámaso Lanche Guillén		Tamaulipas	2nd	Ernesto Donato Cerda Ramírez	
Hidalgo	1st	Adolfo Castelán Flores		Tamaulipas	3rd	Miguel Treviño Emparan	
Hidalgo	2nd	Ernesto Gil Elorduy		Tamaulipas	4th	Jaime Báez Rodríguez	
Hidalgo	3rd	María Amelia Olguín Vargas		Tamaulipas	5th	Joaquín Contreras Cantú	
Hidalgo	4th	Jesús Murillo Karam		Tamaulipas	6th	Hugo Eduardo Barba Islas	
Hidalgo	5th	José Guadarrama Márquez		Tamaulipas	7th	José Bruno del Río Cruz	
Hidalgo	6th	Manuel Rangel Escamilla		Tamaulipas	8th	Pedro Reyes Martínez	
Jalisco	1st	Eduardo Aviña Bátiz		Tamaulipas	9th	Enrique Fernández Pérez	
Jalisco	2nd	Agapito Isaac López		Tlaxcala	1st	Salvador Domínguez Sánchez	
Jalisco	3rd	Adalberto Gómez Rodríguez		Tlaxcala	2nd	Beatriz Paredes Rangel	
Jalisco	4th	Octavio Rafael Bueno Trujillo		Veracruz	1st	Gustavo Gómez Pérez	
Jalisco	5th	Manuel Ojeda Orozco		Veracruz	2nd	Demetrio Ruiz Malerva	
Jalisco	6th	Juan Diego Castañeda Ceballos		Veracruz	3rd	Óscar Torres Pancardo	
Jalisco	7th	Ignacio González Rubio		Veracruz	4th	Gonzalo Anaya Jiménez	
Jalisco	8th	Reyes Rodolfo Flores Zaragoza		Veracruz	5th	Lucía Méndez Hernández	
Jalisco	9th	José María Sotelo Anaya		Veracruz	6th	Luis Octavio Porte Petit Moreno	
Jalisco	10th	Javier Michel Vega		Veracruz	7th	Carlos Roberto Smith Véliz	
Jalisco	11th	Ismael Orozco Loreto		Veracruz	8th	Hesiquio Aguilar de la Parra	
Jalisco	12th	Luis R. Casillas Rodríguez		Veracruz	9th	Miguel Castro Elías	
Jalisco	13th	Juan Delgado Navarro		Veracruz	10th	Silvio Lagos Martínez	
Jalisco	14th	Francisco Rodríguez Gómez		Veracruz	11th	Juan Maldonado Pereda	
Jalisco	15th	Enrique Chavero Ocampo		Veracruz	12th	Gonzalo Vázquez Bravo	
Jalisco	16th	Carlos Rivera Aceves		Veracruz	13th	Marco Antonio Muñoz	
Jalisco	17th	Margarita Gómez Juárez		Veracruz	14th	Sebastián Guzmán Cabrera	
Jalisco	18th	Felipe López Prado		Veracruz	15th	Francisco Mata Aguilar	
Jalisco	19th	Carlos Martínez Rodríguez		Veracruz	16th	Fidel Herrera Beltrán	
Jalisco	20th	Antonio Ruiz Rosas		Veracruz	17th	Manuel Ramos Gurrión (Note: The election of 1 July 1979 in the 17th district was annulled. A special election was held on 2 December, which was won by Ramos Gurrión.)	
Mexico	1st	Juan Ugarte Cortés		Veracruz	18th	Noé Ortega Martínez	
Mexico	2nd	Armando Neyra Chávez		Veracruz	19th	Gonzalo Morgado Huesca	
Mexico	3rd	Alberto Rábago Camacho		Veracruz	20th	Gonzalo Sedas Rodríguez	
Mexico	4th	José Merino Mañón		Veracruz	21st	Carolina Hernández Pinzón	
Mexico	5th	Antonio Huitrón Huitrón		Veracruz	22nd	Rosa María Campos Gutiérrez	
Mexico	6th	Guillermo Olguín Ruiz		Veracruz	23rd	Enrique Carreón Solana	
Mexico	7th	Jorge Antonio Díaz de León Valdivia		Yucatán	1st	Federico Granja Ricalde	
Mexico	8th	Mauricio Valdés Rodríguez		Yucatán	2nd	Gonzalo Navarro Báez	
Mexico	9th	Eugenio Rosales Gutiérrez		Yucatán	3rd	Jorge Jure Cejín	
Mexico	10th	Antonio Mercado Guzmán		Yucatán	4th	Roger Milton Rubio Madera	
Mexico	11th	Héctor Jarquín Hernández		Zacatecas	1st	Arturo Romo Gutiérrez	
Mexico	12th	Lorenzo Valdepeñas Machuca		Zacatecas	2nd	Hermenegildo Fernández Arroyo	
Mexico	13th	Fernando Leyva Medina		Zacatecas	3rd	Rafael Cervantes Acuña	
Mexico	14th	Juan Martínez Fuentes		Zacatecas	4th	Gonzalo García García	
Mexico	15th	Graciela Santana Benhumea		Zacatecas	5th	Aurora Navia Millán	

=== Proportional representation deputies ===
For the 1979 election, 100 proportional representation deputies were elected from three electoral regions. Regions 1 and 2 elected 30 seats, while No. 3 was assigned 40. (Note: For the 1982 general election, the number of regions was increased to four; the fifth region was introduced for the 1985 mid-terms.)

- 1st region: Aguascalientes, Baja California, Baja California Sur, Colima, Guanajuato, Guerrero, Jalisco, Michoacán, Nayarit, Sinaloa and Sonora
- 2nd region: Chihuahua, Coahuila, Durango, Hidalgo, Nuevo León, Querétaro, San Luis Potosí, Tamaulipas, Veracruz and Zacatecas
- 3rd region: Campeche, Chiapas, Federal District, State of Mexico, Morelos, Oaxaca, Puebla, Quintana Roo, Tabasco, Tlaxcala and Yucatán

Region	Deputy	Party	Region	Deputy	Party
First	Luis Calderón Vega		Second	Juan Manuel Lucía Escalera	
First	David Alarcón Zaragoza		Second	Gumersindo Magaña	
First	Rafael Morelos Valdés		Second	Adelaida Márquez Ortiz	
First	Carlos Pineda Flores		Second	Valentín Campa	
First	Antonio Obregón Padilla		Second	Carlos Sánchez Cárdenas	
First	Rafael Morgan Álvarez		Second	Antonio Becerra Gaytán	
First	Juan Manuel López Sanabria		Second	Santiago Fierro Fierro	
First	Alberto Petersen Biester		Second	Pedro Etienne Llano	
First	Salvador Morales Muñoz		Second	Juan Manuel Elizondo C.	
First	Esteban Zamora Camacho		Second	Juan Manuel Rodríguez G.	
First	Cecilia Martha Piñón Reyna		Third	Abel Vicencio Tovar	
First	Delfino Parra Banderas		Third	Eugenio Ortiz Walls	
First	Ezequiel Rodríguez Arcos		Third	David Bravo y Cid de León	
First	Martín Tavira Urióstegui		Third	Armando Ávila Sotomayor	
First	Ernesto Rivera Herrera		Third	Luis Castañeda Guzmán	
First	Antonio Gómez Velazco		Third	Juan Landerreche Obregón	
First	Enrique Peña Vázquez		Third	Francisco Xavier Aponte	
First	Ramiro Lupercio Medina		Third	Carlos Castillo Peraza	
First	Roberto Picón Robledo		Third	Raúl Velazco Zimbrón	
First	Luis Uribe García		Third	Hiram Escudero Álvarez	
First	Luis Cárdenas Murillo		Third	Graciela Aceves Pérez	
First	Felipe Pérez Gutiérrez		Third	Federico Ling Altamirano	
First	Alejandro Gascón Mercado		Third	José Isaac Jiménez Velazco	
First	Roberto Jaramillo Flores		Third	José G. Minondo Garfias	
First	Ramón Danzós Palomino		Third	Miguel Martínez Martínez	
First	Othón Salazar		Third	Lázaro Rubio Félix	
First	Sabino Hernández Téllez		Third	Amado Tame Schear	
First	Jorge Amador Amador		Third	Humberto Pliego Arenas	
First	Adolfo Mejía González		Third	Cuauhtémoc Amezcua Dromundo	
First	Loreto Hugo Amao González		Third	Gilberto Velázquez Sánchez	
Second	Pablo Emilio Madero		Third	Antonio Vázquez del Mercado	
Second	Edmundo Gurza Villarreal		Third	Ricardo Flores Magón	
Second	María del Carmen Jiménez Méndez		Third	Jesús Guzmán Rubio	
Second	Juan de Dios Castro Lozano		Third	Juan Aguilera Azpeitia	
Second	Francisco Ugalde Álvarez		Third	Ernesto Guzmán Gómez	
Second	Jesús González Schmal		Third	Miguel José Valadéz Montoya	
Second	Manuel Rivera del Campo		Third	José Valencia González	
Second	Rafael Alonso y Prieto		Third	Arnoldo Martínez Verdugo	
Second	Augusto Sánchez Losada		Third	Gilberto Rincón Gallardo	
Second	Esteban Aguilar Jáquez		Third	Manuel Stephens García	
Second	Carlos Stephano Sierra		Third	Gerardo Unzueta Lorenzana	
Second	Álvaro Elías Loredo		Third	Evaristo Pérez Arreola	
Second	Hildebrando Gaytán Márquez		Third	Manuel Arturo Salcido Beltrán	
Second	Benito Hernández García		Third	Pablo Gómez Álvarez	
Second	Belisario Aguilar Olvera		Third	Fernando Peraza Medina	
Second	Rafael Carranza Hernández		Third	Juventino Sánchez Jiménez	
Second	Carlos Cantú Rosas		Third	Graco Ramírez	
Second	Horacio Treviño Valdez		Third	Manuel Terrazas Guerrero	
Second	Luis Alberto Gómez Grajales		Third	América Abaroa Zamora	
Second	Rodolfo Delgado Severino		Third	Jesús Ortega Martínez	

== See also ==
- es:Reforma política-electoral de México de 1977
