= LIV Legislature of the Mexican Congress =

54th Congress (LIV Legislatura)
| ← | 53rd | 55th | → |
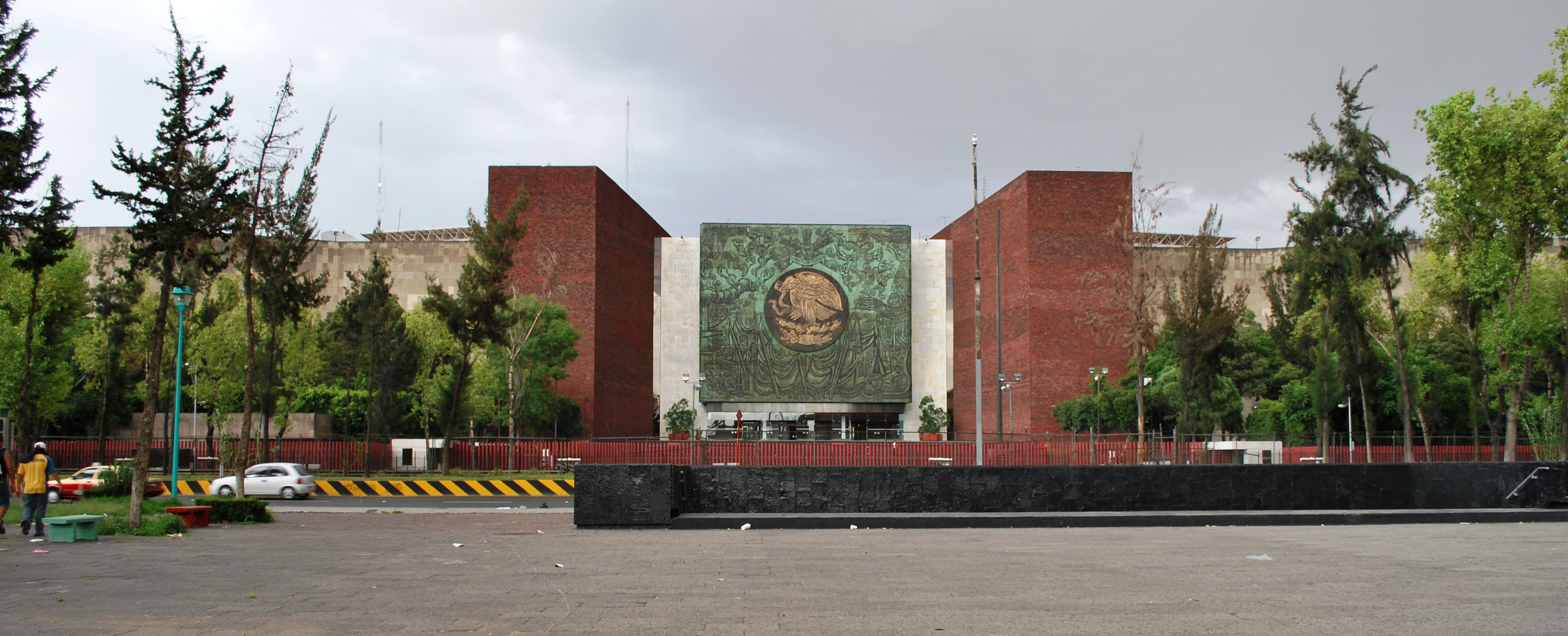
- Legislative Palace of San Lázaro

Overview
- Legislative body: Congress of the Union
- Term: 1 September 1988 – 31 August 1991

Senate
- Members: 64 senators

Chamber of Deputies
- Members: 500 deputies

The LIV Legislature of the Congress of the Union of Mexico (54th Congress) met from 1 September 1988 to 31 August 1991.

32 senators and all of the deputies were elected in the 1988 legislative elections. The deputies served three years and the senators six, continuing into the 55th Congress.

== Senate ==
=== By political party ===
| Party | Senators |
|---|---|
| PRI | 60 |
| PRD | 4 |

=== By state and the federal district ===
| State | Senator | Party | State | Senator | Party |
|---|---|---|---|---|---|
| Aguascalientes | Héctor Hugo Olivares Ventura | | Nayarit | Emilio M. González | |
| Aguascalientes | Héctor Hugo Olivares Ventura | | Nayarit | Emilio M. González | |
| Aguascalientes | Benjamín Zarzosa Díaz | | Nayarit | Julián Gascón Mercado | |
| Baja California | César Moreno Martínez de Escobar; Replaces Margarita Ortega Villa | | Nuevo León | Alfonso Martínez Domínguez | |
| Baja California | Gustavo Adolfo Almaraz | | Nuevo León | Ricardo Canavati Tafich | |
| Baja California Sur | Raúl Enrique Carrillo Silva | | Oaxaca | Idolina Moguel Contreras | |
| Baja California Sur | José Antonio Valdivia | | Oaxaca | Luis Martínez Fernandez del Campo | |
| Campeche | Jorge Adolfo Vega Camacho | | Puebla | Blas Chumacero | |
| Campeche | Francisco Solís Rodríguez | | Puebla | Alfredo Toxqui | |
| Chiapas | José Antonio Melgar Aranda | | Querétaro | Ernesto Luque Feregrino | |
| Chiapas | Blanca Ruth Esponda | | Querétaro | Enrique Burgos García | |
| Chihuahua | Saúl González Herrera | | Quintana Roo | José Joaquín González Castro | |
| Chihuahua | Alonso Aguirre Ramos | | Quintana Roo | María Cristina Sangri Aguilar | |
| Coahuila | Oscar Ramírez Mijares | | San Luis Potosí | Carlos Jonguitud Barrios | |
| Coahuila | Gaspar Valdés Valdés | | San Luis Potosí | Fernando Silva Nieto | |
| Colima | Roberto Ánzar Martínez | | Sinaloa | Salvador Esquer Apodaca | |
| Colima | Graciela Larios Rivas | | Sinaloa | María Alfonso Niebla Álvarez | |
| Durango | Maximiliano Silerio Esparza | | Sonora | Armando Hopkins Durazo; Replaces Luis Donaldo Colosio | |
| Durango | Víctor Uriel Mayagoitia Domínguez | | Sonora | Bulmaro Pacheco Moreno; Replaces Manlio Fabio Beltrones | |
| Guanajuato | José de Jesús Padilla Padilla | | Tabasco | Nicolás Reynés Berazaluce | |
| Guanajuato | Martín Montaño Arteaga | | Tabasco | Roberto Madrazo Pintado | |
| Guerrero | Netzahualcóyotl de la Vega | | Tamaulipas | Ricardo Camero Cerdiel | |
| Guerrero | Antonio Jaimes Aguilar | | Tamaulipas | Laura Alicia Garza Galindo | |
| Hidalgo | Humberto Lugo Gil | | Tlaxcala | Alberto Juárez Blancas | |
| Hidalgo | Julieta Guevara Bautista | | Tlaxcala | Álvaro Salazar Lozano | |
| Jalisco | Justino Delgado Caloca | | Veracruz | Alger León Moreno | |
| Jalisco | María Esther Scherman | | Veracruz | Julio Patiño Rodríguez | |
| Estado de México | Leonardo Rodríguez Alcaine | | Yucatán | José Nerio Torres Ortiz; Replaces Dulce María Sauri Riancho | |
| Estado de México | Jesús Alcántara Miranda | | Yucatán | Gonzalo Navarro Báez | |
| Michoacán | Roberto Robles Garnica | | Zacatecas | Gustavo Salinas Íñiguez | |
| Michoacán | Cristóbal Arias Solís | | Zacatecas | Eliseo Rangel Gaspar | |
| Morelos | Jesús Rodríguez y Rodríguez | | Distrito Federal | Porfirio Muñoz Ledo | |
| Morelos | Hugo Domenzain Guzmán | | Distrito Federal | Ifigenia Martínez | |

=== Parliamentary coordinators ===
- Partido Revolucionario Institucional:
  - Netzahualcóyotl de la Vega
- Partido de la Revolución Democrática:
  - Porfirio Muñoz Ledo

== Chamber of Deputies ==
The Chamber of Deputies had 500 members, elected for three-year terms with no immediate reelection. 300 deputies were elected from single-member districts and the other 200 (up from 100 in previous elections) from party lists in each of the proportional representation (plurinominal) electoral regions.

=== Deputies by political party ===
| Party | Deputies |
|---|---|
| Partido Acción Nacional | 101 |
| Partido Revolucionario Institucional | 262 |
| Partido Popular Socialista | 49 |
| Partido Auténtico de la Revolución Mexicana | 30 |
| Partido del Frente Cardenista de Reconstrucción Nacional | 36 |
| Partido de la Revolución Democrática | 22 |

=== Deputies from the 300 single-member districts ===
| State | District | Deputy | Party | State | District | Deputy | Party |
|---|---|---|---|---|---|---|---|
| Aguascalientes | 1 | Manuel González Díaz de León | | México | 16 | Alfredo Reyes Contreras | |
| Aguascalientes | 2 | Augusto Gómez Villanueva | | México | 17 | Fernando Heberto Barrera Velázquez | |
| Baja California | 1 | Jesús Armando Hernández Montaño | | México | 18 | Astolfo Vicencio Tovar | |
| Baja California | 2 | Bernardo Sánchez Ríos | | México | 19 | Mario Ruiz de Chávez y García | |
| Baja California | 3 | Luis González Ruiz | | México | 20 | Mario Galicía Vargas | |
| Baja California | 4 | Miguel Díaz Muñoz | | México | 21 | Cecilio Barrera Reyes | |
| Baja California | 5 | René Óscar Treviño Arredondo | | México | 22 | Francisco Javier López González | |
| Baja California | 6 | Mercedes Erdmann Baltazar | | México | 23 | Enrique Riva Palacio Galicia | |
| Baja California Sur | 1 | José Luis Parra Rubio | | México | 24 | J.Jesús Ixta Serna | |
| Baja California Sur | 2 | Antonio Manríquez Guluarte | | México | 25 | Delfino Ronquillo Nava | |
| Campeche | 1 | Eraclio Soberanis Sosa | | México | 26 | Maurilio Hernández González | |
| Campeche | 2 | Jorge Enrique Minet Ortiz | | México | 27 | Mauricio Miguel A. Váldez Rodríguez | |
| Chiapas | 1 | Antonio Pariente Algarín | | México | 28 | Teresa Narro y Ramírez | |
| Chiapas | 2 | Javier López Moreno | | México | 29 | Guadalupe M. García Rivas Palmeros | |
| Chiapas | 3 | José Javier Culebro Siles | | México | 30 | Isaac Bueno Soria | |
| Chiapas | 4 | Sami Gabriel David David | | México | 31 | Cuauhtémoc Anda Gutiérrez | |
| Chiapas | 5 | César Ricardo Naumann Escobar | | México | 32 | Margarita Sánchez Gavito Díaz | |
| Chiapas | 6 | Romeo Ruíz Armento | | México | 33 | Ruth Olvera Nieto | |
| Chiapas | 7 | Nefthalí Rojas Hidalgo | | México | 34 | Juan Ugarte Córtes | |
| Chiapas | 8 | Leyber Martínez González | | Michoacán | 1 | Octavio Ortiz Melgarejo | |
| Chiapas | 9 | Arely Madrid Tovilla González | | Michoacán | 2 | Humberto Urquiza Marín | |
| Chihuahua | 1 | Esquipulas David Gómez Reyes | | Michoacán | 3 | Lorenzo Martínez Gómez | |
| Chihuahua | 2 | Rafael Chávez Rodríguez | | Michoacán | 4 | Alfredo Torres Robledo | |
| Chihuahua | 3 | Miguel Agustín Corral Olivas | | Michoacán | 5 | Rodolfo Paniagua Álvarez | |
| Chihuahua | 4 | Santiago de Jesús Rodríguez del Valle | | Michoacán | 6 | Kuri Francisco Pérez Fernández | |
| Chihuahua | 5 | Jorge Esteban Sandoval Ochoa | | Michoacán | 7 | Huber González Jarillo | |
| Chihuahua | 6 | Oscar Villalobos Chávez; Suple a Arturo Armendáriz Delgado | | Michoacán | 8 | Hiram Rivera Teja | |
| Chihuahua | 7 | Carlos Barranco Fuentes | | Michoacán | 9 | Raúl Reyes Ramírez | |
| Chihuahua | 8 | Eliher Saúl Flores Prieto | | Michoacán | 10 | Vicente Luis Coca Álvarez | |
| Chihuahua | 9 | Rebeca Anchondo Fernández | | Michoacán | 11 | Pablo García Figueroa | |
| Chihuahua | 10 | Artemio Iglesia Miramontes | | Michoacán | 12 | Isidro Aguilera Ortiz | |
| Coahuila | 1 | Enrique Martínez y Martínez | | Michoacán | 13 | Rafael Melgoza Radillo | |
| Coahuila | 2 | Alicia López de la Torre | | Morelos | 1 | Mario Rojas Alba | |
| Coahuila | 3 | Benigno Gil de los Santos | | Morelos | 2 | Saturnino Solano Pérez | |
| Coahuila | 4 | Rogelio Montemayor Seguy | | Morelos | 3 | Carlos Enrique Sánchez Mendoza | |
| Coahuila | 5 | Ignacio Dávila Sánchez | | Morelos | 4 | Pablo Torres Chávez | |
| Coahuila | 6 | Humberto Roque Villanueva | | Nayarit | 1 | Salvador Sánchez Vázquez | |
| Coahuila | 7 | Noé Fernando Garza Flores | | Nayarit | 2 | Ignacio González Barragán | |
| Colima | 1 | Socorro Díaz Palacios | | Nayarit | 3 | Olga López Castillo | |
| Colima | 2 | Juan Mesina Alatorre | | Nuevo León | 1 | Benjamín Clariond Reyes | |
| Distrito Federal | 1 | Jaime Guillermo Aviña Zepeda | | Nuevo León | 2 | Luis Humberto Hinojosa Ochoa | |
| Distrito Federal | 2 | Onofre Hernández Rivera | | Nuevo León | 3 | Felipe Onofre Zambrano Páez | |
| Distrito Federal | 3 | Juan Francisco Díaz Aguirre | | Nuevo León | 4 | Agustín Serna Servín | |
| Distrito Federal | 4 | Jesús Anlen López | | Nuevo León | 5 | Eleazar Bazaldúa Bazaldúa | |
| Distrito Federal | 5 | Ramón Choreño Sánchez | | Nuevo León | 6 | Napoleón Cantú Cerna | |
| Distrito Federal | 6 | Sara Villalpando Núñez | | Nuevo León | 7 | Ismael Garza T.González | |
| Distrito Federal | 7 | José Antonio Fernández Sánchez | | Nuevo León | 8 | Rosalio Elías Zúñiga Gutiérrez | |
| Distrito Federal | 8 | Ignacio López Tarso | | Nuevo León | 9 | María Elena Chapa Hernández | |
| Distrito Federal | 9 | Magdaleno Gutiérrez Herrera | | Nuevo León | 10 | Yolanda Minerva García Treviño | |
| Distrito Federal | 10 | Jorge Gómez Villareal | | Nuevo León | 11 | Raúl Caballero Escamilla | |
| Distrito Federal | 11 | Patricia Garduño Morales | | Oaxaca | 1 | José Murat Casaab | |
| Distrito Federal | 12 | Fernando Sologuren Bautista | | Oaxaca | 2 | Artemio Meixueiro Siguenza | |
| Distrito Federal | 13 | Hilda Josefina Anderson Nevárez | | Oaxaca | 3 | Raúl Bolaños Cacho Guzmán | |
| Distrito Federal | 14 | Serafín Ramírez Ramírez | | Oaxaca | 4 | Juan José Moreno Sada | |
| Distrito Federal | 15 | Pedro A. Salazar Muciño | | Oaxaca | 5 | Diódoro Carrasco Palacios | |
| Distrito Federal | 16 | José Arturo Ocampo Villalobos | | Oaxaca | 6 | Eloy Argos García Aguilar | |
| Distrito Federal | 17 | José Luis Luege Tamargo | | Oaxaca | 7 | María Teresa Chagoya Méndez | |
| Distrito Federal | 18 | María Claudia Esqueda Llanes | | Oaxaca | 8 | Cirila Sánchez Mendoza | |
| Distrito Federal | 19 | Eleazar Cervantes Medina | | Oaxaca | 9 | Jorge González Llescas | |
| Distrito Federal | 20 | Sóstenes Melgarejo Fraga | | Oaxaca | 10 | Jorge Camacho Cabrera | |
| Distrito Federal | 21 | Víctor M. Sarabía Luna | | Puebla | 1 | Víctor M. Carreto y Fernández de Lara | |
| Distrito Federal | 22 | María del Rosario E. Guerra Díaz | | Puebla | 2 | Carlos Enrique Grajales Sálas | |
| Distrito Federal | 23 | Esther Kolteniuk Toyber | | Puebla | 3 | César Alfonso Neri Ávila | |
| Distrito Federal | 24 | Guillermo Jiménez Morales | | Puebla | 4 | Serafín Sánchez Campos | |
| Distrito Federal | 25 | Demetrio Sodi | | Puebla | 5 | Cupertino Alejo Domínguez | |
| Distrito Federal | 26 | Jorge Schiaffino Isunza | | Puebla | 6 | Willebaldo García de la Cadena Romero | |
| Distrito Federal | 27 | Juan José Hernández Trejo | | Puebla | 7 | Francisco Sálas Hernández | |
| Distrito Federal | 28 | Adolfo Barrientos Parra | | Puebla | 8 | Rafael Campos López | |
| Distrito Federal | 29 | Guillermo Islas Olguín | | Puebla | 9 | Alejandro Paredes Jurado | |
| Distrito Federal | 30 | Mario Vargas Saldaña | | Puebla | 10 | Alberto Amador Leal Narciso | |
| Distrito Federal | 31 | José Luis Alfonso Sampayo | | Puebla | 11 | Miguel Ángel Quiroz Pérez | |
| Distrito Federal | 32 | Joaquín S. Álvarez Ordóñez | | Puebla | 12 | Marco Antonio Rojas Flores | |
| Distrito Federal | 33 | Antonio Lozano García | | Puebla | 13 | Armando Roberto Moreno Nava | |
| Distrito Federal | 34 | Juan José Osorio Palacios | | Puebla | 14 | María de los Ángeles Blanco Casco | |
| Distrito Federal | 35 | José I. Cuauhtémoc Paleta | | Querétaro | 1 | María Elena Martínez Carranza | |
| Distrito Federal | 36 | Federico Ruiz López | | Querétaro | 2 | Octaviano Camargo Rojas | |
| Distrito Federal | 37 | Miguel Aroche Parra | | Querétaro | 3 | Benjamín Edgardo Rocha Pedraza | |
| Distrito Federal | 38 | Marcela Lombardo Otero | | Quintana Roo | 1 | Elina Elfi Coral Castilla | |
| Distrito Federal | 39 | Juan Miguel Alcántara Soria | | Quintana Roo | 2 | Isidoro Victoria Mendoza de la Cruz | |
| Distrito Federal | 40 | Álvaro Gárces Rojas | | San Luis Potosí | 1 | Mario Leal Campos | |
| Durango | 1 | Juaquín Garduño Vargas | | San Luis Potosí | 2 | José Guadalupe Vega Macías | |
| Durango | 2 | J.Natividad Ibarra Rayas | | San Luis Potosí | 3 | Emilio de Jesús Ramírez Guerrero | |
| Durango | 3 | Rubén Hernández Higuera | | San Luis Potosí | 4 | Miguel de J. Martínez Castro | |
| Durango | 4 | María Albertina Barbosa Espinoza | | San Luis Potosí | 5 | Fructuoso López Cárdenas | |
| Durango | 5 | J. Leodegario Soto Cesaretti | | San Luis Potosí | 6 | Gonzalo Martínez Corbalá | |
| Durango | 6 | Lázaro Pasillas Rodríguez | | San Luis Potosí | 7 | Rebeca Guevara de Terán | |
| Guanajuato | 1 | Miguel Montes García | | Sinaloa | 1 | Ramón Alejo Váldez López | |
| Guanajuato | 2 | Elías Villegas Torres | | Sinaloa | 2 | Benito Juárez Camacho | |
| Guanajuato | 3 | Vicente Fox Quesada | | Sinaloa | 3 | Jorge del Rincón Bernal | |
| Guanajuato | 4 | Antonio del Río Abaunza | | Sinaloa | 4 | Juan Rodolfo López Monroy | |
| Guanajuato | 5 | Rubén García Farías | | Sinaloa | 5 | Martín Gavica Garduño | |
| Guanajuato | 6 | Gilberto Muñoz Mosqueta | | Sinaloa | 6 | Ma.Eduwiges Vega Padilla | |
| Guanajuato | 7 | Álvaro Uribe Sálas | | Sinaloa | 7 | David Miranda Valdez | |
| Guanajuato | 8 | José Manuel Mendoza Márquez | | Sinaloa | 8 | Rafael Núñez Pellegrín | |
| Guanajuato | 9 | María Esther Valiente Govea | | Sinaloa | 9 | Pablo Moreno Cota | |
| Guanajuato | 10 | Everardo Vargas Zavala | | Sonora | 1 | Armando López Nogales | |
| Guanajuato | 11 | José Pedro Gama Medina | | Sonora | 2 | Francisco Javier Pavlovich Robles | |
| Guanajuato | 12 | Jorge García Henaine | | Sonora | 3 | José Ignacio Martínez Tadeo | |
| Guanajuato | 13 | María Moreno y Contreras de Almanza | | Sonora | 4 | Juan Manuel Verongo Rosas | |
| Guerrero | 1 | Carlos Javier Vega Memije | | Sonora | 5 | Víctor Hugo Celaya Celaya | |
| Guerrero | 2 | Félix Salgado Macedonio | | Sonora | 6 | Sergio Jesús Torres Serrano | |
| Guerrero | 3 | Valdemar Soto Jaimes | | Sonora | 7 | Ramiro Valdez Fontes | |
| Guerrero | 4 | Guadalupe Gómez Maganda de Anaya | | Tabasco | 1 | Gustavo Rosario Torres | |
| Guerrero | 5 | Blas Vergara Aguilar | | Tabasco | 2 | Darvín González Ballina | |
| Guerrero | 6 | Juan Albarrán Castañeda | | Tabasco | 3 | Joaquín Ruíz Becerra | |
| Guerrero | 7 | Pablo Ávalos Castro | | Tabasco | 4 | Víctor León Ramos Zoila | |
| Guerrero | 8 | Jaime Castrejón Diez | | Tabasco | 5 | Fredi Chable Torrano | |
| Guerrero | 9 | María Inés Solís González | | Tamaulipas | 1 | Jesús González Bastien | |
| Guerrero | 10 | Rubén Figueroa Alcocer | | Tamaulipas | 2 | José Elías Leal; Suple a Jorge Constantino Barba Islas | |
| Hidalgo | 1 | Esthela Rojas de Soto | | Tamaulipas | 3 | Miguel Treviño Emparán | |
| Hidalgo | 2 | Alberto Assad Ávila | | Tamaulipas | 4 | Jaime Rodríguez Inurrigarro | |
| Hidalgo | 3 | César Humberto Vieyra Salgado | | Tamaulipas | 5 | Álvaro Homero Garza Cantú | |
| Hidalgo | 4 | Orlando Arvizu Lara | | Tamaulipas | 6 | Julián Murillo Navarro | |
| Hidalgo | 5 | Gregorio Javier Bonilla Chávez | | Tamaulipas | 7 | Bernardino Canchola Herrera | |
| Hidalgo | 6 | Rodolfo Ruiz Pérez Escobar | | Tamaulipas | 8 | Manuel Cavazos Lerma | |
| Jalisco | 1 | Blanca Leticia Escoto | | Tamaulipas | 9 | Raúl García Leal | |
| Jalisco | 2 | Sergio Alfonso Rueda Montoya | | Tlaxcala | 1 | Félix Pérez Amador | |
| Jalisco | 3 | Silvano Urzua Ochoa | | Tlaxcala | 2 | Jesús Pelecastre Rojas | |
| Jalisco | 4 | Alfredo Oropeza García | | Veracruz | 1 | Carlos Herrera Rodríguez | |
| Jalisco | 5 | Héctor A. Ixtlahuac Gaspar | | Veracruz | 2 | Graciela Gómez Rodríguez de Ibarra | |
| Jalisco | 6 | Julián Orozco González | | Veracruz | 3 | Vicente Sequera Mercado | |
| Jalisco | 7 | Juan Enrique Ibarra Pedroza | | Veracruz | 4 | Edmundo Martínez Zaleta | |
| Jalisco | 8 | Margarita Gómez Juárez | | Veracruz | 5 | Gustavo Moreno Ramos | |
| Jalisco | 9 | Francisco Galindo Musa | | Veracruz | 6 | Ricardo Olivares Pineda | |
| Jalisco | 10 | Francisco Javier Santillán Oceguera | | Veracruz | 7 | Dionisio Eduardo Pérez Jácome | |
| Jalisco | 11 | Ismael Orozco Loreto | | Veracruz | 8 | Fernando Córdoba Lobo | |
| Jalisco | 12 | Ramiro Hernández García | | Veracruz | 9 | Alberto Andrade Rodríguez | |
| Jalisco | 13 | César Coll Carabias | | Veracruz | 10 | Adalberto Díaz Jacome | |
| Jalisco | 14 | José Manuel Martínez Aguirre | | Veracruz | 11 | Rodolfo Duarte Rivas | |
| Jalisco | 15 | Gregorio Curiel Díaz | | Veracruz | 12 | Gilberto Uzlanga Medina | |
| Jalisco | 16 | Jesús Oscar Navarro Gareta | | Veracruz | 13 | Humberto Peña Reyes | |
| Jalisco | 17 | Sofía Valencia Abundis | | Veracruz | 14 | Vicente Torres Ruiz | |
| Jalisco | 18 | Antonio Álvarez Esparza | | Veracruz | 15 | Marco Antonio Castellanos López | |
| Jalisco | 19 | Oscar Chacón Iñiguez | | Veracruz | 16 | Nicodemus Santos Luck | |
| Jalisco | 20 | Raúl Octavio Espinoza Martínez | | Veracruz | 17 | Antonio Cruz Sánchez | |
| México | 1 | Sara Esthela Velázquez Sánchez | | Veracruz | 18 | Francisco Sánchez Rodríguez | |
| México | 2 | Héctor Jarquín Hernández | | Veracruz | 19 | Luis Antonio Pérez Fraga | |
| México | 3 | Octavio Moreno Toscano | | Veracruz | 20 | Jorge Sierra Gallardo | |
| México | 4 | Agustín Gasca Pliego | | Veracruz | 21 | Américo Javier Flores Nava | |
| México | 5 | Jaime Almazán Delgado | | Veracruz | 22 | Fernando Palacios Vela | |
| México | 6 | Magdaleno Luis Miranda Reséndiz | | Veracruz | 23 | Rosa Elena Guizar Villa | |
| México | 7 | Luis Martínez Souverville Rivera | | Yucatán | 1 | Ana Rosa Payán Cervera | |
| México | 8 | Alfonso Alcocer Velázquez | | Yucatán | 2 | Carlos Rubén Calderón y Cecilio | |
| México | 9 | Rafael Pedro Caray Cornejo | | Yucatán | 3 | Noé Antonio Peniche Patrón | |
| México | 10 | José Luis Salcedo Solís | | Yucatán | 4 | Eric Luis Rubio Barthell | |
| México | 11 | Javier Gaeta Vázquez | | Zacatecas | 1 | Julián Ibargüengoítia Cabral | |
| México | 12 | Regulo Pastor Hernández Rivera | | Zacatecas | 2 | Ricardo Monreal Ávila | |
| México | 13 | Reyes Antonio Silva Beltrán | | Zacatecas | 3 | Victorio de la Torre de la Torre | |
| México | 14 | José de Jesús Miramontes Jiménez | | Zacatecas | 4 | Carlos Pavón Campos | |
| México | 15 | Martha Patricia Rivera Pérez | | Zacatecas | 5 | José Manuel Rios Núñez | |

=== Deputies from the plurinominal electoral regions ===
Alexandro Martínez Camberos

Noé Aguilar Tinajero

=== Presidents of the Head Commission ===
- (1988 - 1991): Guillermo Jiménez Morales
- (1991): Socorro Díaz Palacios

=== Parliamentary coordinators ===
- Partido Acción Nacional (PAN):
  - Abel Vicencio Tovar
- Partido Revolucionario Institucional (PRI):
  - Guillermo Jiménez Morales
- Partido Popular Socialista (PPS):
  - Francisco Ortíz Mendoza
- Partido Mexicano Socialista (PMS):
  - Pablo Gómez
- Corriente Democrática:
  - Ignacio Castillo Mena
- Partido del Frente Cardenista de Reconstrucción Nacional:
  - Pedro René Etienne Llano
- Partido Auténtico de la Revolución Mexicana (PARM):
  - Óscar Mauro Ramírez Ayala

| Preceded by LIII Legislature | LIV Legislature; 1988 to 1991 | Succeeded by LV Legislature |
