= Cuauhtémoc Anda Gutiérrez =

Mexican politician (born 1938)

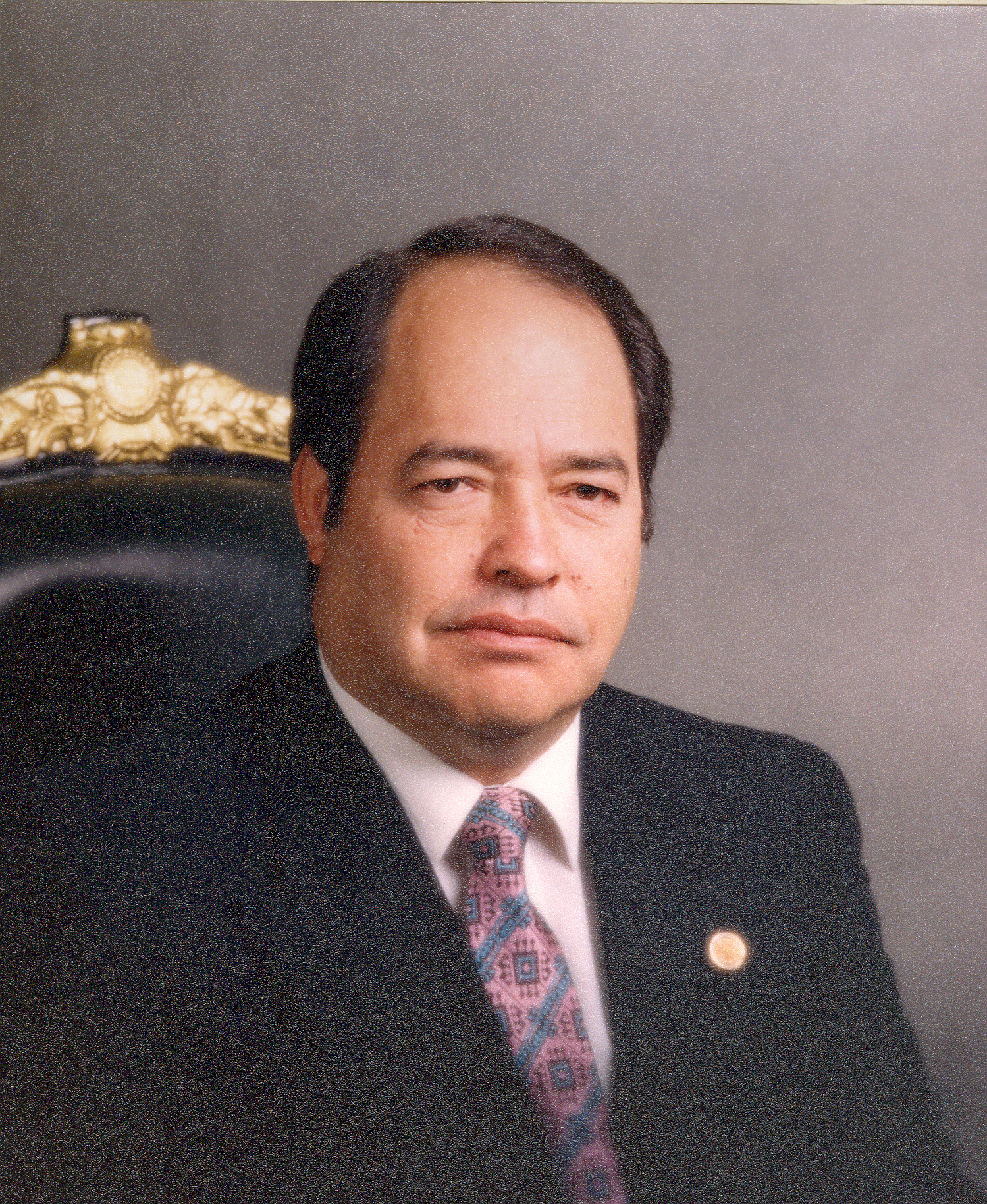

Deputy of the Congress of the Union for the 31st district of the State of Mexico
- In office 1 September 1988 – 31 August 1991
- Preceded by: Fernando Ortiz Arana
- Succeeded by: Manuel Jiménez Guzmán

Deputy of the Congress of the Union for the 23rd district of the Federal District
- In office 1 September 1979 – 31 August 1982
- Preceded by: Enrique Soto Izquierdo
- Succeeded by: Servio Tulio Acúña Zumalacarregui

Personal details
- Born: 1938 (age 87–88) Mexico City, Mexico
- Party: PRI
- Occupation: Politician

Cuauhtémoc Anda Gutiérrez (born 25 December 1938) is a Mexican politician affiliated with the Institutional Revolutionary Party (PRI). He served as a deputy in the 51st Congress, representing the 23rd district of the Federal District, and the 54th Congress, representing the 31st district of the State of Mexico.

He was the President of the Chamber of Deputies in 1980.
