= Alfredo Barba Hernández =

Mexican politician (born 1944)

- Born: 12 May 1944 (age 82); Tepatitlán de Morelos, Jalisco, Mexico
- Occupation: Politician
- Political party: PRI

Alfredo Barba Hernández (born 12 May 1944) is a Mexican politician from the Institutional Revolutionary Party (PRI).

A native of Tepatitlán de Morelos, Jalisco, he has served three terms in the Chamber of Deputies:

- 1982–1985 (52nd Congress), for Jalisco's 18th district, elected in the 1982 general election
- 1991–1994 (55th Congress), for Jalisco's 18th district, elected in the 1991 mid-terms
- 2006–2009 (60th Congress), as a plurinominal deputy, elected in the 2000 general election

He was also municipal president of Tlaquepaque, Jalisco, in 1989–1991 and has worked extensively in the trade-union system.
