= Rebeca Anchondo Fernández =

Mexican politician (1926–2012)

Rebeca Anchondo Fernández (Note: In this Mexican name, the surname is Anchondo and the second or maternal family name is Fernández.) (29 January 1926 – 9 January 2012) was a Mexican politician who was affiliated with the Institutional Revolutionary Party (PRI). She served two terms as a federal deputy and was distinguished for promoting women's political rights in Mexico during the 1950s.

== Biography ==
Anchondo Fernández was born in Hacienda Corralitos, a small town in the municipality of Nuevo Casas Grandes, Chihuahua. She studied commerce in the city of Nuevo Casas Grandes, where she was notable for her activism in favor of granting women the right to vote. As such, she served as secretary of the municipal committee of the PRI from 1951 to 1958, was elected as the first councilor of the municipality of Nuevo Casas Grandes from 1956 to 1959, served as secretary of the municipality from 1962 to 1971 and as deputy mayor from 1971 to 1974.

In 1974, she was elected to the Congress of Chihuahua, where she served until 1977. During this period, she was the first female president of the State Congress. In 1979, she was elected for the first time to the Chamber of Deputies for Chihuahua's 9th district to the 51st Congress, which concluded in 1982. She was elected for the second time as a federal deputy for the same electoral district to the 54th Congress from 1988 to 1991.

She died on 9 January 2012 in the city of Chihuahua.
