= Laura Garza Galindo =

Mexican politician

President of the Chamber of Deputies
- In office 15 April 1993 – 14 May 1993
- Preceded by: Guillermo Pacheco Pulido
- Succeeded by: Jaime Muñoz Domínguez

Personal details
- Born: 27 November 1947 (age 78) Ciudad Victoria, Tamaulipas, Mexico
- Party: PRI
- Education: Autonomous University of San Luis Potosi (lic.); National Autonomous University of Mexico (MA)
- Occupation: Politician

Laura Alicia Garza Galindo (born 27 November 1947) is a Mexican politician affiliated with the Institutional Revolutionary Party (PRI).

Garza Galindo was born in Ciudad Victoria, Tamaulipas, in 1947. She has represented the PRI in both chambers of Congress: as a senator during the 54th, 58th and 59th sessions, representing Tamaulipas, and as a deputy in the 55th session (for Tamaulipas's 4th) and 57th session (for Tamaulipas's 5th).
