= Salvador Sánchez Vázquez =

Mexican politician (1940–2014)

- Born: 21 October 1940; Tepic, Nayarit, Mexico
- Died: 29 November 2014 (aged 74)
- Education: UNAM
- Occupation: Politician
- Political party: PRI

Salvador Sánchez Vázquez (Note: In this Mexican name, the surname is Sánchez and the second or maternal family name is Vázquez.) (21 October 1940 – 29 November 2014) was a Mexican politician affiliated with the Institutional Revolutionary Party (PRI).

Sánchez Vázquez was a native of Tepic, Nayarit. He was elected to the Chamber of Deputies on three occasions: in 1988, to the 54th Congress, for Nayarit's 1st district; in 1997, to the 57th Congress, for Nayarit's 2nd district; and in 2003, to a plurinominal seat in the 59th Congress. From 1991 to 1997, during the 55th and 56th Congresses, he served in the Senate for the state of Nayarit.

Salvador Sánchez Vázquez died on 29 November 2014, at the age of 74.
