= José Ascensión Orihuela Bárcenas =

Mexican politician (born 1952)

José Ascención Orihuela
- Born: 19 March 1952 (age 74); Zitácuaro, Michoacán, Mexico
- Education: IPN
- Occupation: Senator
- Political party: PRI

José Ascención Orihuela Bárcenas (born 19 March 1952) is a Mexican politician affiliated with the Institutional Revolutionary Party. He currently serves as Senator of the LXII Legislature of the Mexican Congress representing Michoacán. He also served as Senator during the LVII Legislature and as Deputy during the LV and LX Legislature, as well as a local deputy in the Congress of Michoacán.
