= Sami David David =

Mexican politician

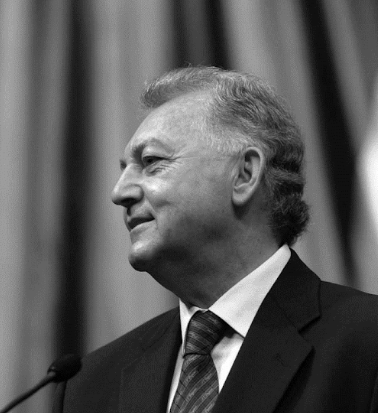

President of the Chamber of Deputies
- In office 15 June 1991 – 31 October 1991
- Preceded by: María Claudia Esqueda Llanes
- Succeeded by: Fernando Ortiz Arana

Personal details
- Born: 5 April 1950 (age 75) Acapetahua, Chiapas, Mexico
- Party: PRI
- Occupation: Politician

Sami Gabriel David David (born 5 April 1950) is a Mexican politician affiliated with the Institutional Revolutionary Party (PRI) who has served in both chambers of Congress.

Sami David was born on 5 April 1950 in Acapetahua, Chiapas. In 1973 he graduated from the National Autonomous University of Mexico (UNAM) with a degree in political science and public administration.

He has been elected to the Chamber of Deputies on four occasions:

- In the 1982 general election (52nd Congress) for the 7th district of Chiapas.
- In the 1988 general election (54th Congress) for the 4th district of Chiapas.
- In the 2003 mid-terms (59th Congress) as a plurinominal deputy.
- In the 2009 mid-terms (61st Congress) for the 12th district of Chiapas.

In addition, in the 1994 general election, he was elected to the Senate for the state of Chiapas, where he served during the 56th and 57th sessions of Congress.
