= 6th federal electoral district of Durango =

Defunct federal electoral district of Mexico

Coordinates: 25°33′N 103°31′W

The 6th federal electoral district of Durango (Spanish: Distrito electoral federal 06 de Durango) was a federal electoral district of Mexico from 1916 to 1930 and again from 1977 to 1997. During its most recent existence, it returned one deputy to the Chamber of Deputies for each three-year legislative session by means of the first-past-the-post system. Votes cast in the district also counted towards the calculation of proportional representation ("plurinominal") deputies elected from the country's electoral regions.

The original 6th district of Durango was dissolved in 1930. (Note: An amendment to Article 52 of the Constitution in 1928 changed the original provision of "one deputy per 60,000 inhabitants" to "one deputy per 100,000"; as a result, the size of the Chamber of Deputies fell from 281 in the 1928 election to 171 in 1934.) It was re-established as part of the 1977 electoral reforms, which increased the number of single-member seats in the Chamber of Deputies from 196 to 300, with Durango's seat allocation rising from four to six. It was dissolved again by the Federal Electoral Institute (IFE) in its 1996 redistricting process, when the state's population no longer warranted six districts. The restored 6th district was therefore first contested in the 1979 mid-terms and elected its last deputy in the 1994 general election.

== District territory ==
Evolution of electoral district numbers
	1974	1978	1996	2005	2017	2023
Durango	4	6	5	4	4	4
Chamber of Deputies	196	300				

During its 1977–1996 existence, the 6th district covered the municipalities of El Oro, Hidalgo, Indé, Lerdo, Mapimí, Nazas, Ocampo, San Luis del Cordero and San Pedro del Gallo. Its head town (cabecera distrital), where results from individual polling stations were gathered together and tallied, was at the city of Lerdo.

== Deputies returned to Congress ==
(Mexico) National parties
- Current
- PAN
- PRI
- PT
- PVEM
- MC
- Morena
- PAZ
- Somos
- Defunct or local only
- PLM
- PNR
- PRM
- PNM
- PP
- PPS
- PARM
- PFCRN
- CON
- PANAL
- PSD
- PES
- PES
- PRD

Durango's 6th district
Election	Deputy	Party	Term	Legislature
1916	Alberto Terrones Benítez		1916–1917	Constituent Congress of Querétaro
...
1924	Alberto Terrones Benítez		1924–1926	31st Congress
1926	Jesús Salas Barraza		1926–1928	32nd Congress
1928	Jesús Salas Barraza		1928–1930	33rd Congress
The sixth district was suspended between 1930 and 1977
1979	Práxedis Nevárez Zepeda	Institutional Revolutionary Party	1979–1982	51st Congress
1982	Cirino Olvera Espinoza	Institutional Revolutionary Party	1982–1985	52nd Congress
1985	Joel Lleverino Reyes	Institutional Revolutionary Party	1985–1988	53rd Congress
1988	Lázaro Pasillas Rodríguez	Institutional Revolutionary Party	1988–1991	54th Congress
1991	Jesús Molina Lozano	Institutional Revolutionary Party	1991–1994	55th Congress
1994	José Luis Fernando González Achem	Institutional Revolutionary Party	1994–1997	56th Congress
