= Socorro Díaz Palacios =

Mexican journalist and politician

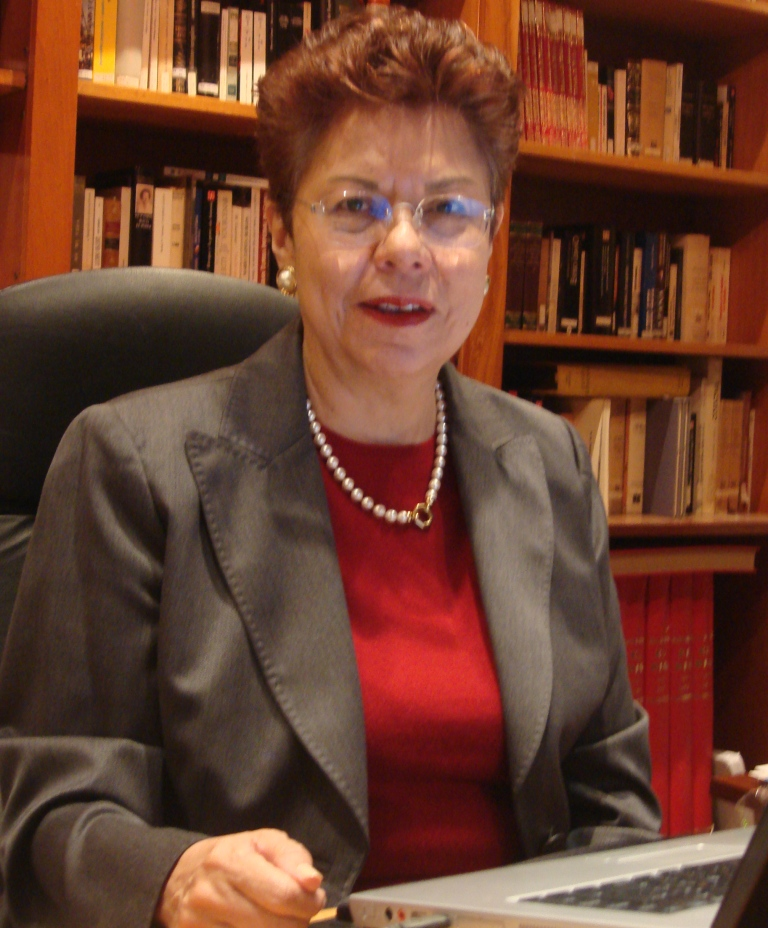

President of the Chamber of Deputies
- In office 1 December 1988 – 31 December 1988
- Preceded by: Augusto Gómez Villanueva
- Succeeded by: Mauricio Valdez Rodríguez

Deputy of the Congress of the Union Plurinominal
- In office 1 September 2003 – 31 August 2006
- In office 1 September 1988 – 31 August 1991

Personal details
- Born: 16 February 1949 (age 77) Coquimatlán, Colima, Mexico
- Party: PRI(1982–2003); PRD (2003–present)
- Occupation: Journalist and politician

Socorro Díaz Palacios (born 16 February 1949) is a Mexican journalist and politician affiliated with the Party of the Democratic Revolution (formerly to the Institutional Revolutionary Party). As of 2014 she served as Deputy of the LIV and the LIX Legislaturez of the Mexican Congress as a plurinominal representative and as Senator of the LIII Legislature.
