= Santiago Fierro Fierro =

Mexican politician

Santiago Fierro Fierro (29 October 1921 – December 2009) was a Mexican politician and medical doctor. He was born in Durango. Fierro Fierro joined the Popular Socialist Party (PPS) in 1960. In 1964 he became the general secretary of PPS in Teziutlán, later becoming the general secretary of the party organization in Durango. In 1970 he stood as the PPS candidate for mayor of Durango. He also stood as candidate for parliament on behalf of the PPS in several elections. Between 1970 and 1975 he was an alternate Central Committee member of PPS.

He left PPS and joined the Mexican People's Party (PPM), in which he became an Executive Committee member. He was elected to parliament in 1979 as a candidate of the Leftist Coalition Party. His tenure lasted until 1982. Fierro Fierro died in December 2009, at the age of 88.
