= Teresa Ortuño Gurza =

Mexican politician

- Born: 16 June 1957 (age 69); Torreón, Coahuila, Mexico
- Occupations: Deputy and Senator
- Political party: PAN
- Website: http://www.tereortuno.org/

María Teresa Ortuño Gurza (born 16 June 1957) is a Mexican politician affiliated with the PAN. As of 2013 she served as Senator of the LX and LXI Legislatures of the Mexican Congress representing the Federal District. She also served as Deputy during the 1982–1985 and 1988–1992 periods.
