= Carlos Jiménez Macías =

Mexican politician

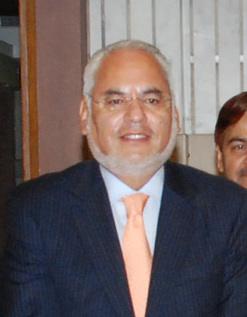
- Born: 1 May 1950 (age 76); San Luis Potosí, San Luis Potosí, Mexico
- Occupations: Deputy and Senator
- Political party: PRI

Carlos Martín Jiménez Macías (born 1 May 1950) is a Mexican politician affiliated with the PRI. As of 2013 he served as Senator of the LX and LXI Legislatures of the Mexican Congress representing San Luis Potosí. He also served as Deputy in the LVII and LIX Legislatures.

Since March 2013 he serves as Mexican Consul in Chicago.
