= José Guadarrama Márquez =

Mexican politician

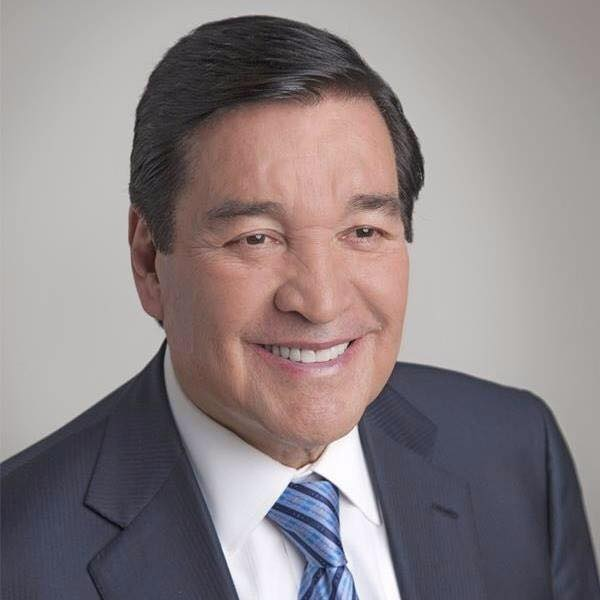
José Guadarrama Márquez

José Guadarrama Márquez (born 16 December 1948) is a Mexican politician affiliated with the Party of the Democratic Revolution (PRD) who served in the upper house of Congress from 1994 to 2000 and again from 2006 to 2012.

== Career ==
Guadarrama is a professor who had a long and notable political career in the State of Hidalgo as an Institutional Revolutionary Party (PRI) member. He served as federal deputy from 1979 to 1982, for Hidalgo's fifth district, again from 1991 to 1994 for Hidalgo's second district and as a senator from 1994 to 2000. He has also occupied different position within the Government of Hidalgo.

In 1999 he unsuccessfully tried to obtain the PRI candidacy for the gubernatorial elections but was defeated by Manuel Angel Núñez Soto. In 2005 he tried again but this time he was defeated by Miguel Ángel Osorio Chong; then, following the primaries in Hidalgo, he left the PRI and ran for governor representing the PRD; he lost the election. In 2006 he ran for senator as the Coalition for the Good of All candidate; this time he won the election and was elected to serve during the LX and LXI Legislatures (2006–2012).
