= María Elena Chapa =

Mexican politician (1944–2021)

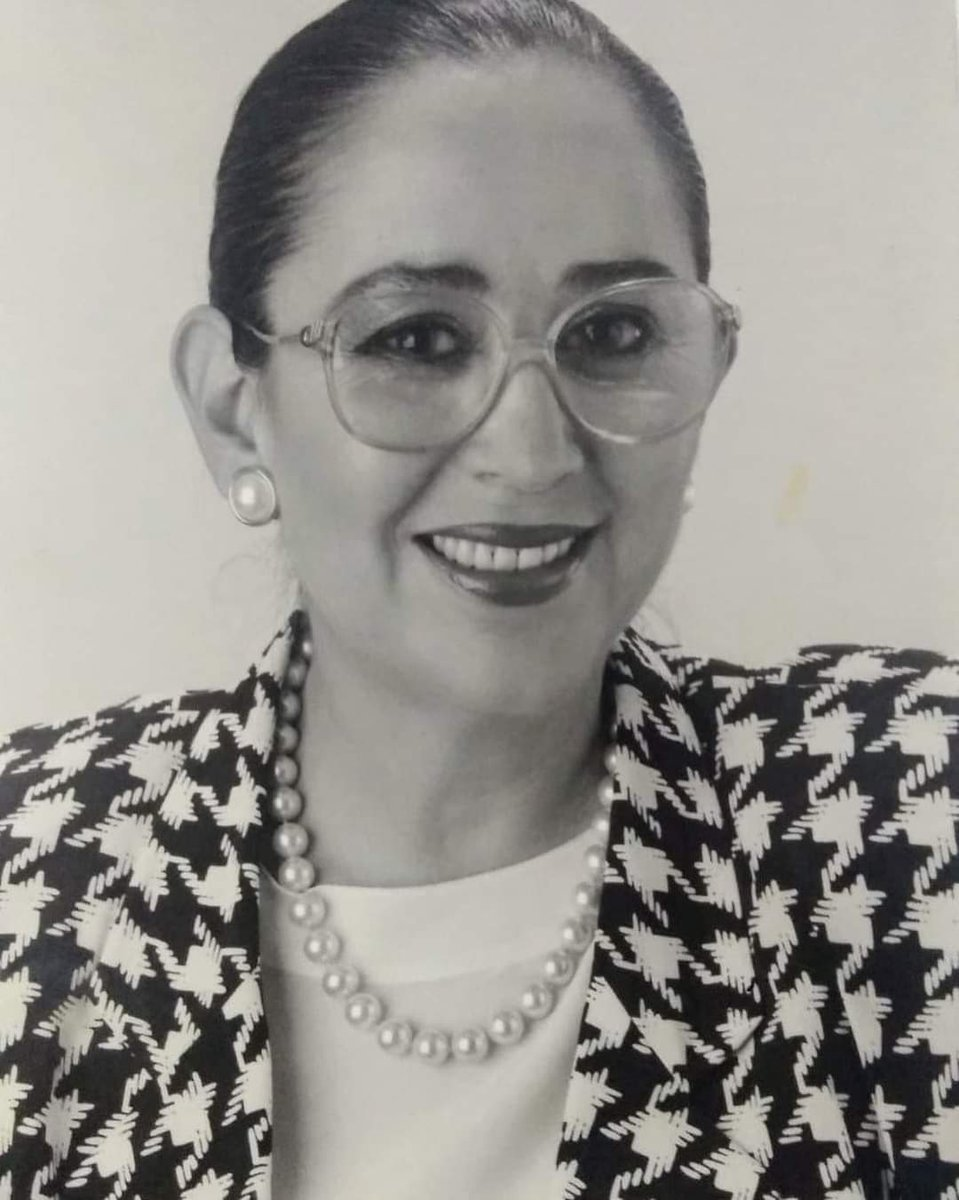

Member of the Senate of Mexico
- In office 1991–1997

Member of the Chamber of Deputies for Nuevo León's 9th district
- In office 1988–1991

Personal details
- Born: 19 April 1944
- Died: 9 August 2021 (aged 77)

María Elena Chapa Hernández (19 April 1944 – 9 August 2021) was a Mexican politician from the Institutional Revolutionary Party (PRI). She served as a deputy twice and as a senator.
