= Areli Madrid Tovilla =

Mexican politician (born 1952)

- Born: 18 February 1952 (age 74); Huixtla, Chiapas, Mexico
- Occupation: Politician
- Political party: PRI

Areli Madrid Tovilla (Note: In this Mexican name, the surname is Madrid and the second or maternal family name is Tovilla.) (born 18 February 1952) is a Mexican politician affiliated with the Institutional Revolutionary Party (PRI). She has held positions in the government of Chiapas and in the agrarian branch of the judiciary and has served in both chambers of Congress.

== Political career ==
Areli Madrid Tovilla was born in Huixtla, Chiapas, on 18 February 1952. She graduated in law from the Autonomous University of Puebla in 1975, completed a master's in criminal law at the Autonomous University of Tlaxcala in 1997, and earned a doctorate in law from the Instituto Internacional de Derecho del Estado in 2004.

In the 1982 general election she was elected to the Chamber of Deputies to represent the 2nd district of Chiapas; during her period of office (1982–1985) she chaired the agrarian reform committee and was the secretary of the handcrafts committee. She returned to the Chamber of Deputies in the 1988 general election for Chiapas's 9th district, when she again chaired the agrarian reform committee and served as secretary of the handcrafts committee.

Between 1992 and 1997 she was a judge on the Superior Agrarian Court. In the 1997 mid-terms she won her third term in the Chamber of Deputies, for the newly created 11th district of Chiapas; she again chaired the agrarian reform committee and served on several other congressional committees. In 1998 she was the general secretary of government of Chiapas.

In the 2000 general election she was elected to the Senate for Chiapas. During her six-year term in the upper chamber, she chaired the agrarian reform committee and the committee responsible for the Belisario Domínguez Medal.

She returned to the lower house in the 2006 general election as a plurinominal deputy. From 2010 to 2012 she was a local deputy in the Congress of Chiapas. In the 2012 general election she was again elected to a plurinominal seat in the federal Chamber of Deputies.
