= Graciela Larios Rivas =

Mexican politician

- Born: 10 February 1950 (age 76); Colima, Colima, Mexico
- Occupation: Politician
- Political party: PRI

Graciela Larios Rivas (born 10 February 1950) is a Mexican politician affiliated with the Institutional Revolutionary Party. As of 2014 she served as Senator of the LVI and LVII Legislatures of the Mexican Congress and as Deputy of the LIX Legislature as a plurinominal representative.
