= Fernando Ortiz Arana =

Mexican politician

Senator for Querétaro
- In office 1 November 1994 – 31 August 2000
- Preceded by: Ernesto Luque Feregrino
- Succeeded by: Francisco Fernández de Cevallos

34th President of the Institutional Revolutionary Party
- In office 30 March 1993 – 13 March 1994
- Preceded by: Genaro Borrego Estrada
- Succeeded by: Ignacio Pichardo Pagaza

President of the Chamber of Deputies
- In office 1 November 1991 – 30 November 1991
- Preceded by: Sami David David
- Succeeded by: Rigoberto Ochoa Zaragoza
- In office 1 December 1985 – 31 August 1986
- Preceded by: Blas Chumacero
- Succeeded by: Nicolás Reynés Berazaluce

Member of the Chamber of Deputies for Querétaro's 1st district
- In office 1 November 1991 – 14 April 1993
- Preceded by: Ma. Elena Martínez Carranza
- Succeeded by: José D. Olvera Cervantes
- In office 1 September 1979 – 31 August 1982
- Preceded by: Eduardo D. Ugalde Vargas
- Succeeded by: Angélica Paulín Posada

Member of the Chamber of Deputies for the Federal District's 31st district
- In office 1 September 1985 – 31 August 1988
- Preceded by: Ma. Luisa Calzada de Campos
- Succeeded by: José Luis Alfonso Sampayo

Personal details
- Born: 26 October 1944 (age 81) Santiago de Querétaro, Querétaro, Mexico
- Party: PRI

Fernando Ortiz Arana (born 26 October 1944) is a Mexican politician and long serving legislator affiliated with the Institutional Revolutionary Party (PRI).

Born in Santiago de Querétaro, Ortiz Arana is the son of José Ortiz Antañana, a real estate agent, and Virginia Arana Morán. He graduated from the Autonomous University of Querétaro in 1967 with a bachelor's degree in law.

He joined the Institutional Revolutionary Party in 1963 and chaired it in the late 1990s. He has also served three terms as a federal congressman, as the President of the Chamber of Deputies in 1991, one term as a senator and has run unsuccessfully for governor in 1997 against his brother José and then against Ignacio Loyola Vera. He ran again in 2003.

In the mid-90s Ortiz Arana and three other members of the PRI party were called "The Fantastic Four", dominating the political landscape of Querétaro.
