= 6th federal electoral district of Querétaro =

Federal electoral district of Mexico

Querétaro's 6th
- Electoral district of the Chamber of Deputies of Mexico

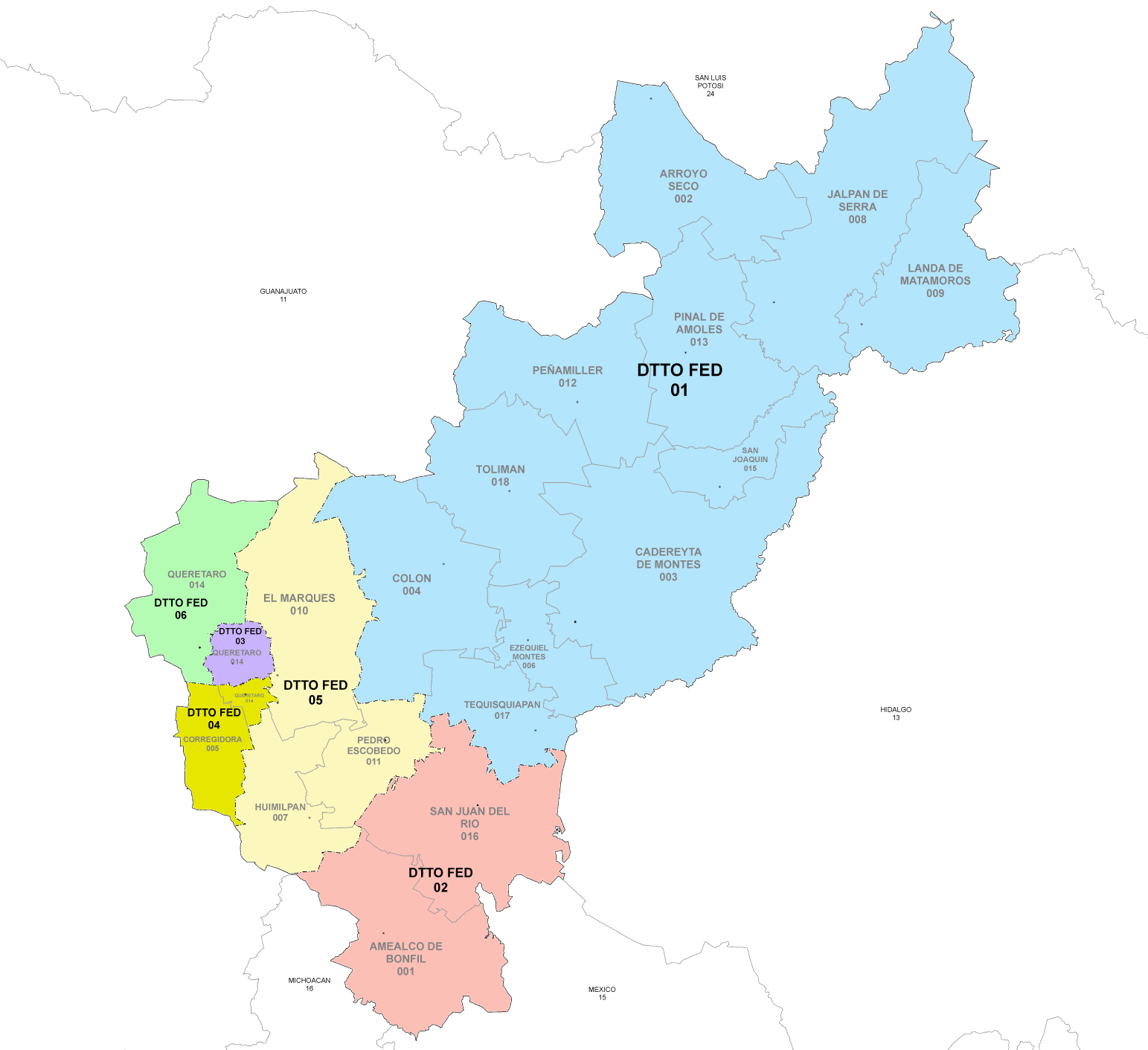
- 6th district since 2023

Incumbent
- Member: Luis Humberto Fernández
- Party: ▌Morena
- Congress: 66th (2024–2027)

District
- State: Querétaro
- Head town: Santiago de Querétaro
- Coordinates: 20°35′N 100°23′W
- Covers: Municipality of Querétaro (part)
- PR region: Fifth
- Precincts: 130
- Population: 424,029 (2020 census)

The 6th federal electoral district of Querétaro (Spanish: Distrito electoral federal 06 de Querétaro) is one of the 300 electoral districts into which Mexico is divided for elections to the federal Chamber of Deputies and one of six such districts in the state of Querétaro.

It elects one deputy to the lower house of Congress for each three-year legislative session by means of the first-past-the-post system. Votes cast in the district also count towards the calculation of proportional representation ("plurinominal") deputies elected from the fifth region.

The 6th district was created by the National Electoral Institute (INE) in its 2021–2023 redistricting process because of shifting population patterns. It was first contended in the 2024 general election. The district's inaugural member is Luis Humberto Fernández Fuentes of the National Regeneration Movement (Morena).

== District territory ==
Evolution of electoral district numbers
	1974	1978	1996	2005	2017	2023
Querétaro	2	3	4	4	5	6
Chamber of Deputies	196	300				

Querétaro's 6th district was established by the National Electoral Institute (INE) in its 2023 districting plan, which is to be used for the 2024, 2027 and 2030 federal elections. It covers 130 precincts (secciones electorales) in the north-west of the municipality of Querétaro.

The head town (cabecera distrital), where results from individual polling stations are gathered together and tallied, is the state capital, Santiago de Querétaro. The district reported a population of 424,029 in the 2020 census.

== Deputies returned to Congress ==
(Mexico) National parties
- Current
- PAN
- PRI
- PT
- PVEM
- MC
- Morena
- PAZ
- Somos
- Defunct or local only
- PLM
- PNR
- PRM
- PNM
- PP
- PPS
- PARM
- PFCRN
- CON
- PANAL
- PSD
- PES
- PES
- PRD

Querétaro's 6th district
Election	Deputy	Party	Term	Legislature
2024	Luis Humberto Fernández Fuentes	National Regeneration Movement	2024–2027	66th Congress

== Presidential elections ==
Querétaro's 6th district
Election	District won by	Party or coalition	%
2024	Claudia Sheinbaum Pardo	Sigamos Haciendo Historia	53.9483
