= Federal electoral districts of Mexico =

Congressional constituencies in Mexico

The federal electoral districts (Spanish: distritos electorales federales) of Mexico are the 300 constituencies or electoral districts into which the country is divided for the purpose of federal elections. Each district returns one federal deputy (diputado or diputada), who sits in the Chamber of Deputies (Cámara de Diputados), the lower house of Congress. An additional 200 deputies are elected by proportional representation from five electoral regions.

Electoral districts are identified by number and by federal entity (state or the capital). The number of electoral districts was set at 300 in 1979, when the number of seats in the Chamber of Deputies was increased from 196. The demarcation of the districts depends on the results of the previous census, and adjustments to the 1979 districts were made in 1996, 2005, 2017 and 2022.

Irrespective of population, no state may be represented by fewer than two electoral districts. This is the case with Baja California Sur (population: 798,447), Campeche (population: 928,363) and Colima (population: 731,391), which, as a result, return more senators than deputies to Congress. The states with the most electoral districts are the state of Mexico (population: 17.1 million), with 40, and Veracruz (population: 8.1 million), with 19. Mexico City, with a population of 9.2 million, has 22.

On 12 December 2022, the National Electoral Institute (INE) established the districts to be used in the 2024 and 2030 general elections, and the 2027 mid-term election, in accordance with the following criteria:

- Each district to belong to only one federal entity.
- Balanced distribution of population (per the 2020 census) between districts.
- Presence of Indigenous and Afrodescendent inhabitants (districts with 40% or more of those populations are styled "indigenous districts" and receive special prerogatives). (Note: The 2022 districting process identified 44 such districts, up from 28 in 2007.)
- Geographical continuity.
- Travel times.

The new districting scheme was published in the Official Journal on 20 February 2023.

== Distribution of electoral districts ==
This map indicates the districts in each federal entity for elections between 2024 and 2030.

Evolution of electoral district numbers
	1974	1978	1996	2005	2017	2023
Aguascalientes	2	2	3	3	3	3
Baja California	3	6	6	8	8	9
Baja California Sur	2	2	2	2	2	2
Campeche	2	2	2	2	2	2
Chiapas	6	9	12	12	13	13
Chihuahua	6	10	9	9	9	9
Coahuila	4	7	7	7	7	8
Colima	2	2	2	2	2	2
Durango	4	6	5	4	4	4
Guanajuato	9	13	15	14	15	15
Guerrero	6	10	10	9	9	8
Hidalgo	5	6	7	7	7	7
Jalisco	13	20	19	19	20	20
Mexico City (Federal District)	27	40	30	27	24	22
State of Mexico	15	34	36	40	41	40
Michoacán	9	13	13	12	12	11
Morelos	2	4	4	5	5	5
Nayarit	2	3	3	3	3	3
Nuevo León	7	11	11	12	12	14
Oaxaca	9	10	11	11	10	10
Puebla	10	14	15	16	15	16
Querétaro	2	3	4	4	5	6
Quintana Roo	2	2	2	3	4	4
San Luis Potosí	5	7	7	7	7	7
Sinaloa	5	9	8	8	7	7
Sonora	4	7	7	7	7	7
Tabasco	3	5	6	6	6	6
Tamaulipas	6	9	8	8	9	8
Tlaxcala	2	2	3	3	3	3
Veracruz	15	23	23	21	20	19
Yucatán	3	4	5	5	5	6
Zacatecas	4	5	5	4	4	4
Chamber of Deputies	196	300				

== Electoral districts by state ==
=== Aguascalientes ===
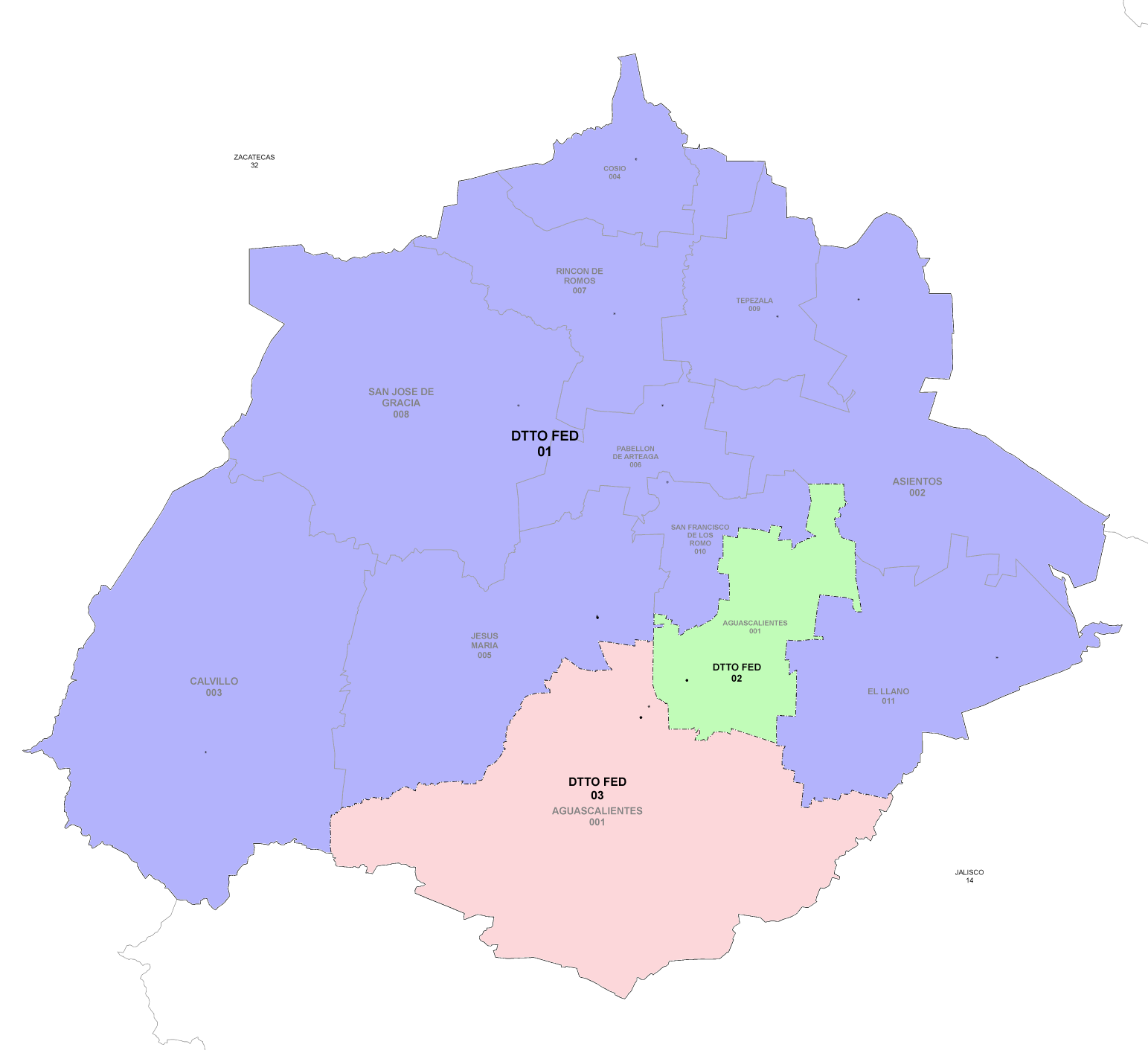
Federal electoral districts of Aguascalientes since 2023

District	Head town
1st federal electoral district of Aguascalientes	Jesús María
2nd federal electoral district of Aguascalientes	Aguascalientes
3rd federal electoral district of Aguascalientes	Aguascalientes
4th federal electoral district of Aguascalientes	Defunct since 1902

=== Baja California ===
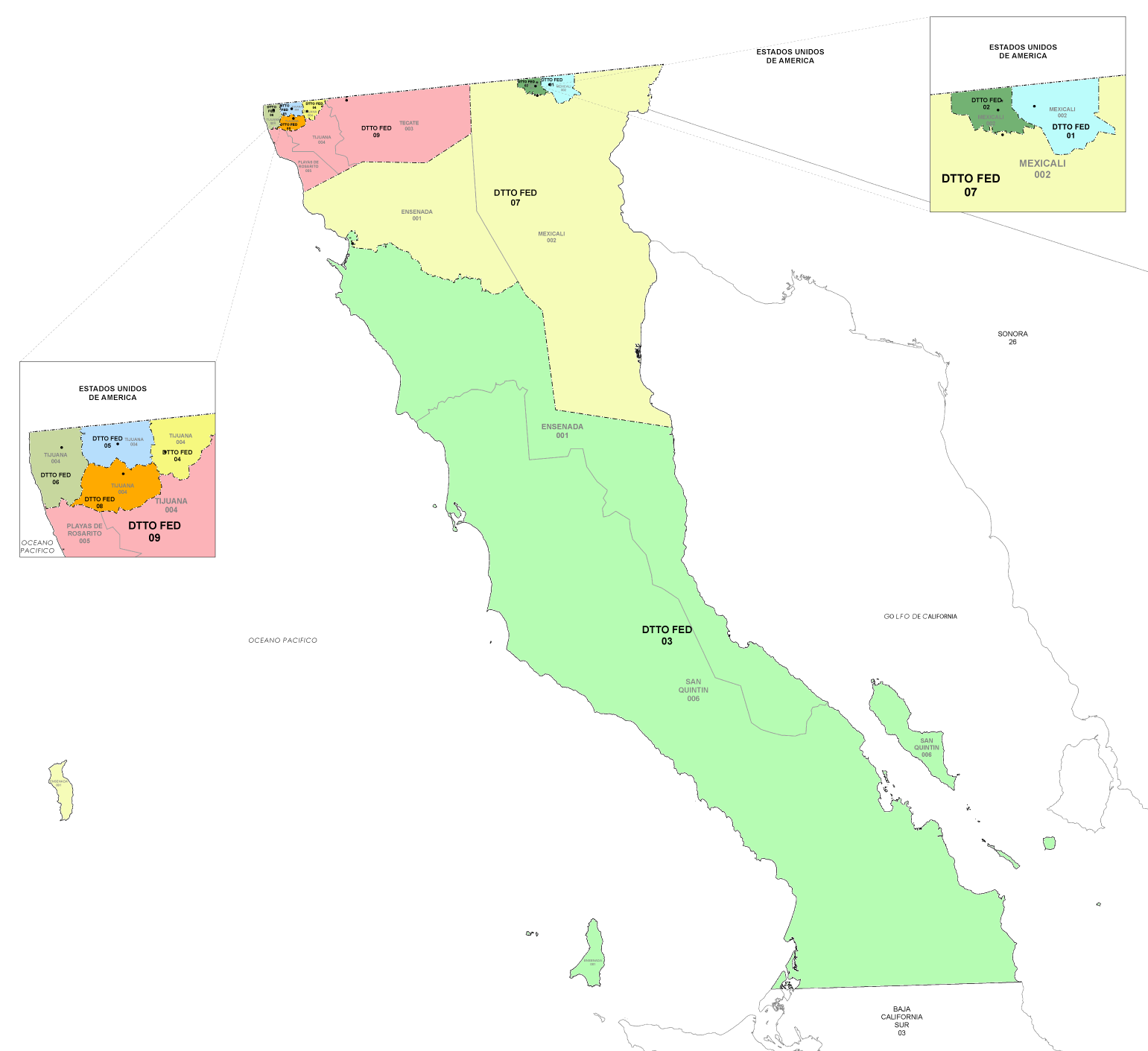
Federal electoral districts of Baja California since 2023

District	Head town
1st federal electoral district of Baja California	Mexicali
2nd federal electoral district of Baja California	Mexicali
3rd federal electoral district of Baja California	Ensenada
4th federal electoral district of Baja California	Tijuana
5th federal electoral district of Baja California	Tijuana
6th federal electoral district of Baja California	Tijuana
7th federal electoral district of Baja California	Mexicali
8th federal electoral district of Baja California	Tijuana
9th federal electoral district of Baja California	Tecate

=== Baja California Sur ===
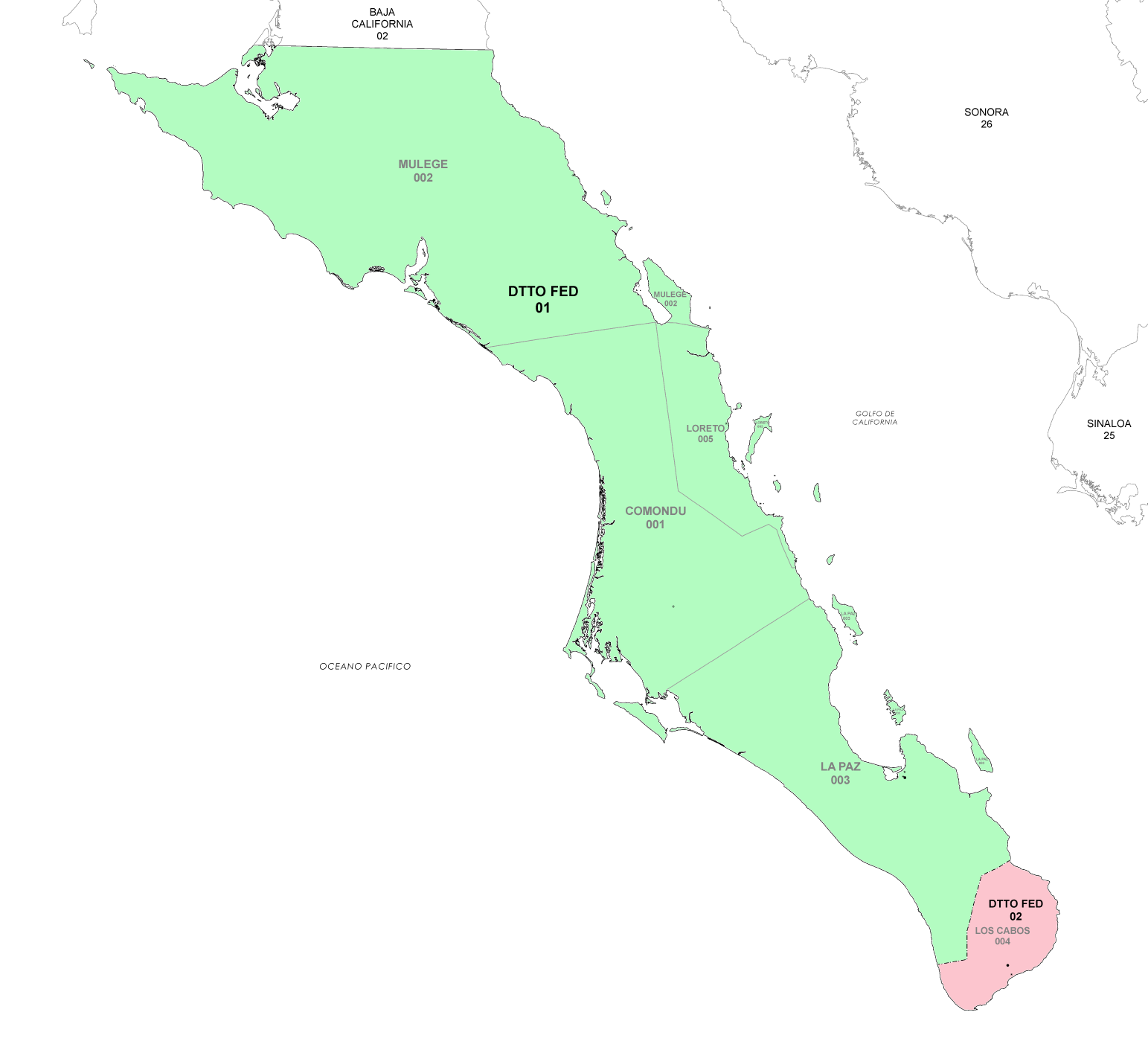
Federal electoral districts of Baja California Sur since 2023

District	Head town
1st federal electoral district of Baja California Sur	La Paz
2nd federal electoral district of Baja California Sur	San José del Cabo

=== Campeche ===
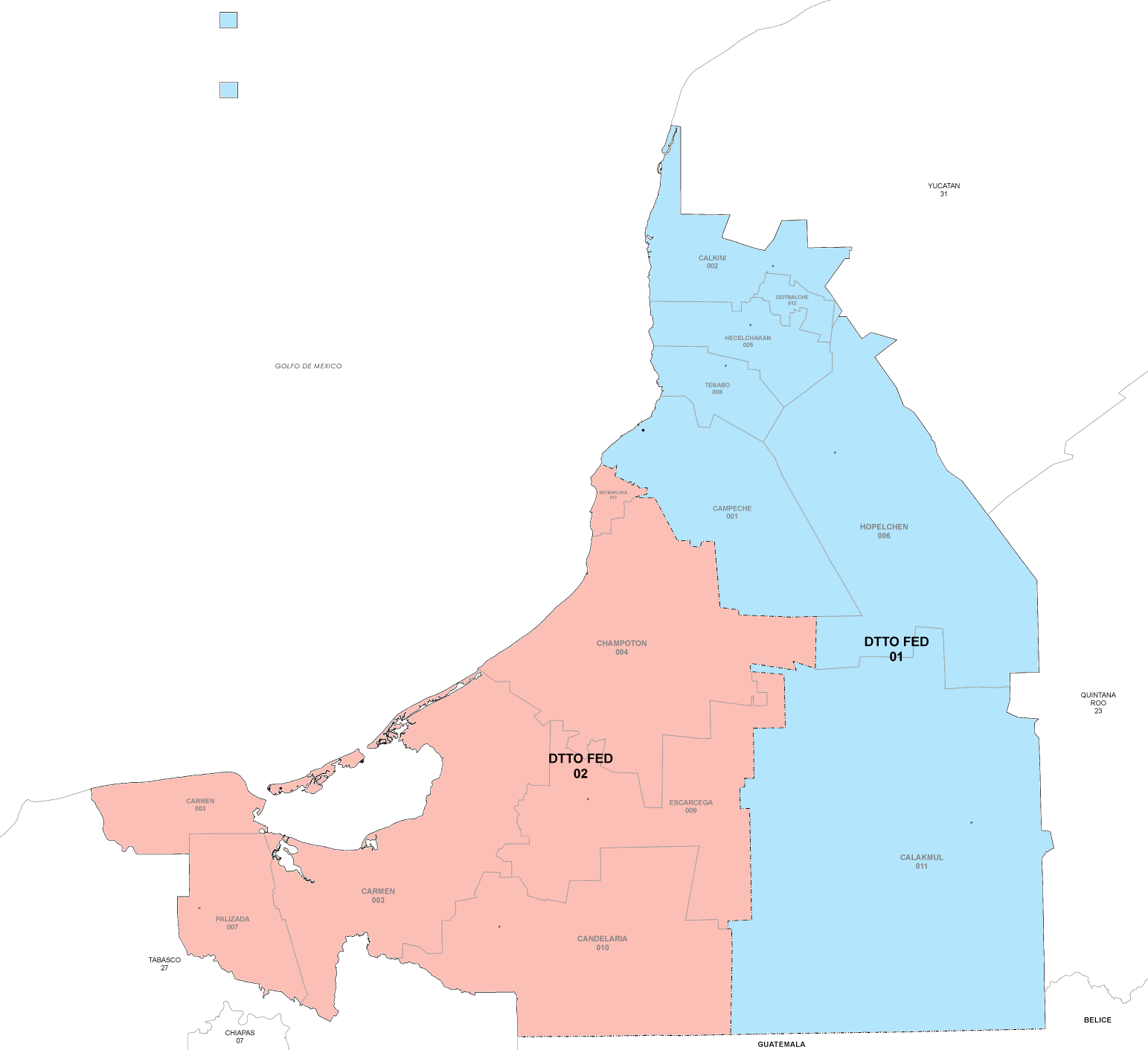
Federal electoral districts of Campeche since 2023

District	Head town
1st federal electoral district of Campeche	San Francisco de Campeche
2nd federal electoral district of Campeche	Ciudad del Carmen

=== Chiapas ===
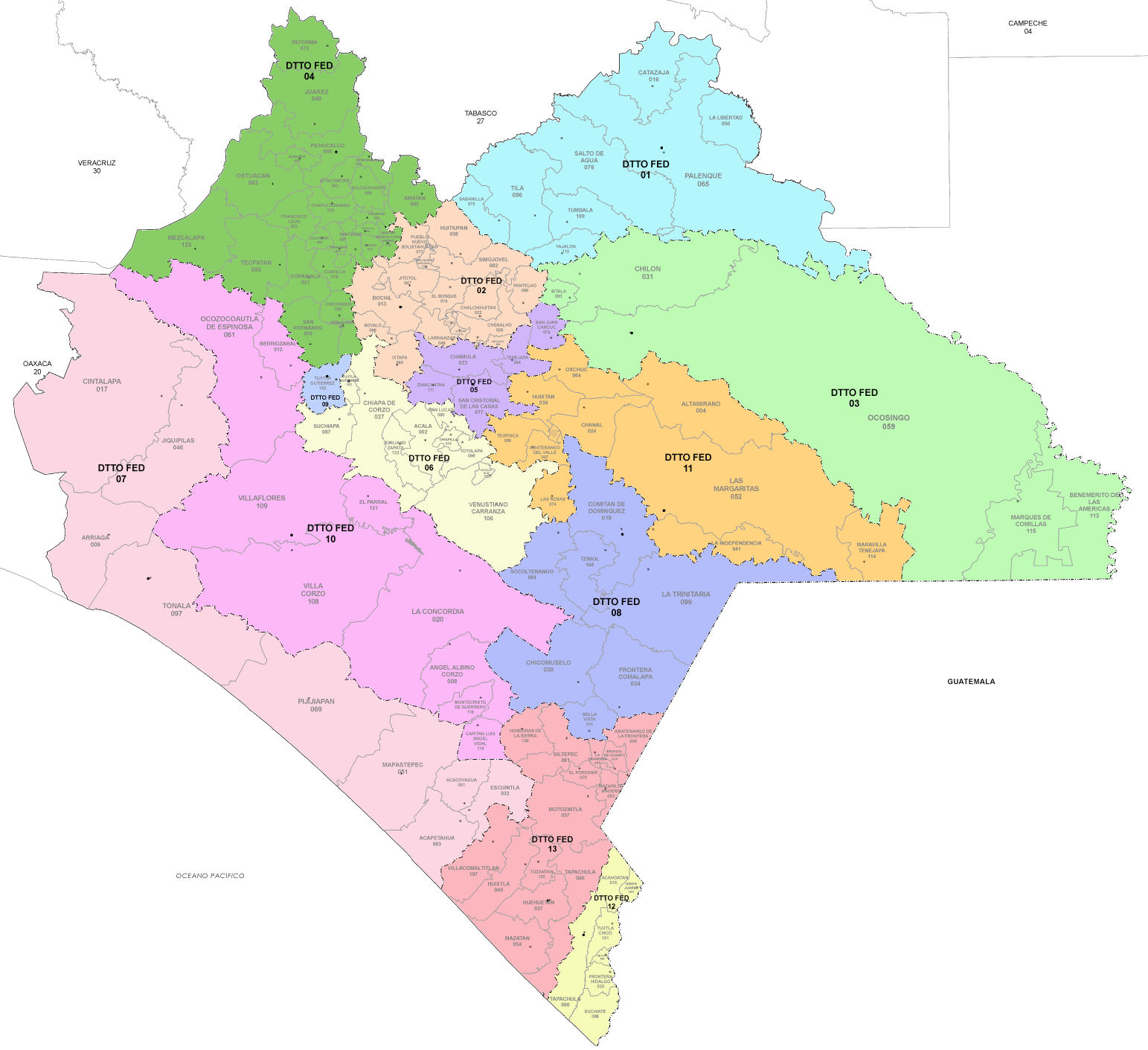
Federal electoral districts of Chiapas since 2023

District	Head town
1st federal electoral district of Chiapas	Palenque
2nd federal electoral district of Chiapas	Bochil
3rd federal electoral district of Chiapas	Ocosingo
4th federal electoral district of Chiapas	Pichucalco
5th federal electoral district of Chiapas	San Cristóbal de las Casas
6th federal electoral district of Chiapas	Tuxtla Gutiérrez
7th federal electoral district of Chiapas	Tonalá
8th federal electoral district of Chiapas	Comitán
9th federal electoral district of Chiapas	Tuxtla Gutiérrez
10th federal electoral district of Chiapas	Villaflores
11th federal electoral district of Chiapas	Las Margaritas
12th federal electoral district of Chiapas	Tapachula
13th federal electoral district of Chiapas	Huehuetán

=== Chihuahua ===
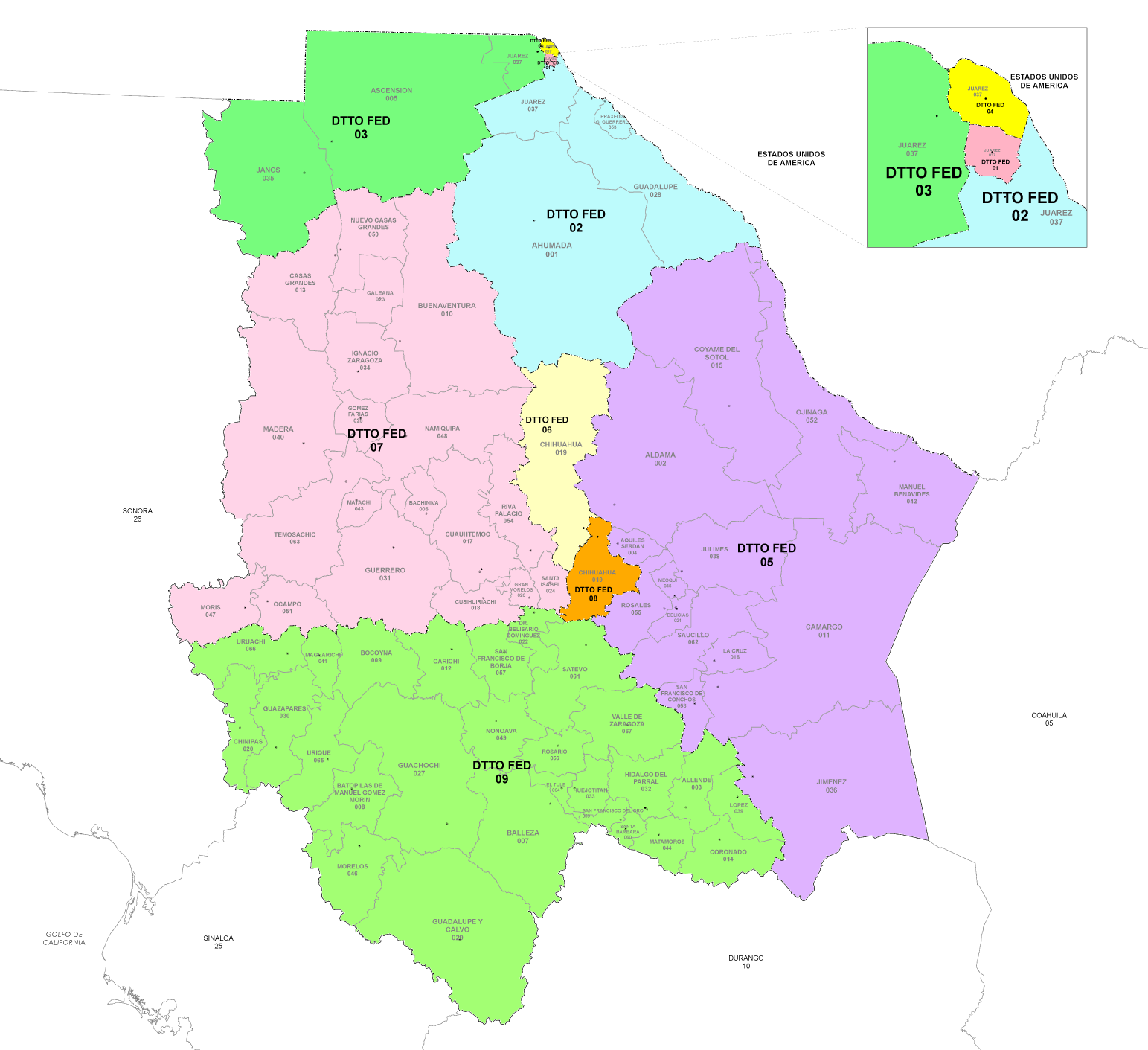
Federal electoral districts of Chihuahua since 2023

District	Head town
1st federal electoral district of Chihuahua	Ciudad Juárez
2nd federal electoral district of Chihuahua	Ciudad Juárez
3rd federal electoral district of Chihuahua	Ciudad Juárez
4th federal electoral district of Chihuahua	Ciudad Juárez
5th federal electoral district of Chihuahua	Delicias
6th federal electoral district of Chihuahua	Chihuahua
7th federal electoral district of Chihuahua	Cuauhtémoc
8th federal electoral district of Chihuahua	Chihuahua
9th federal electoral district of Chihuahua	Hidalgo del Parral
10th federal electoral district of Chihuahua	Defunct since 1996

=== Coahuila ===
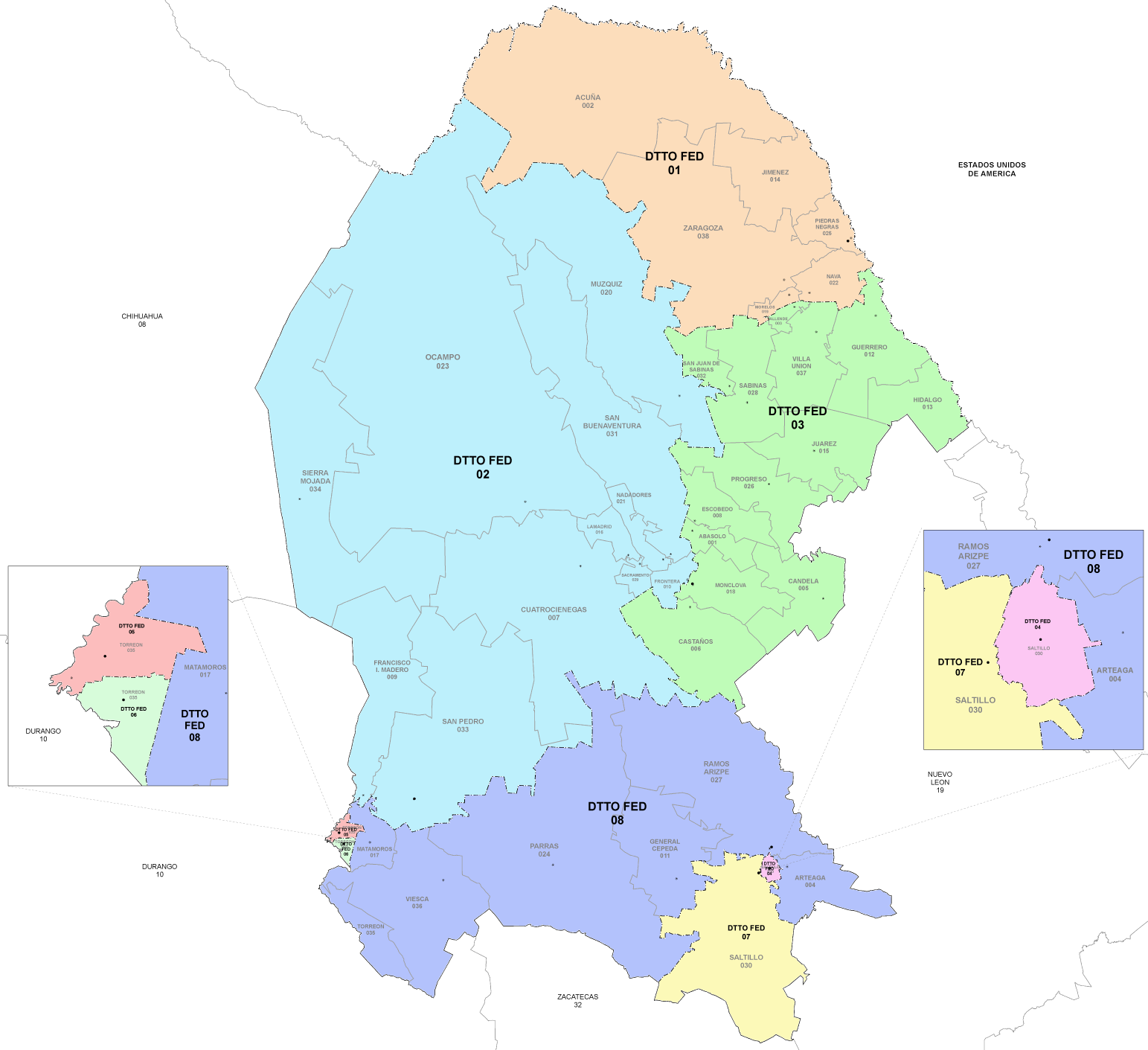
Federal electoral districts of Coahuila since 2023

District	Head town
1st federal electoral district of Coahuila	Piedras Negras
2nd federal electoral district of Coahuila	San Pedro de las Colonias
3rd federal electoral district of Coahuila	Monclova
4th federal electoral district of Coahuila	Saltillo
5th federal electoral district of Coahuila	Torreón
6th federal electoral district of Coahuila	Torreón
7th federal electoral district of Coahuila	Saltillo
8th federal electoral district of Coahuila	Ramos Arizpe

=== Colima ===
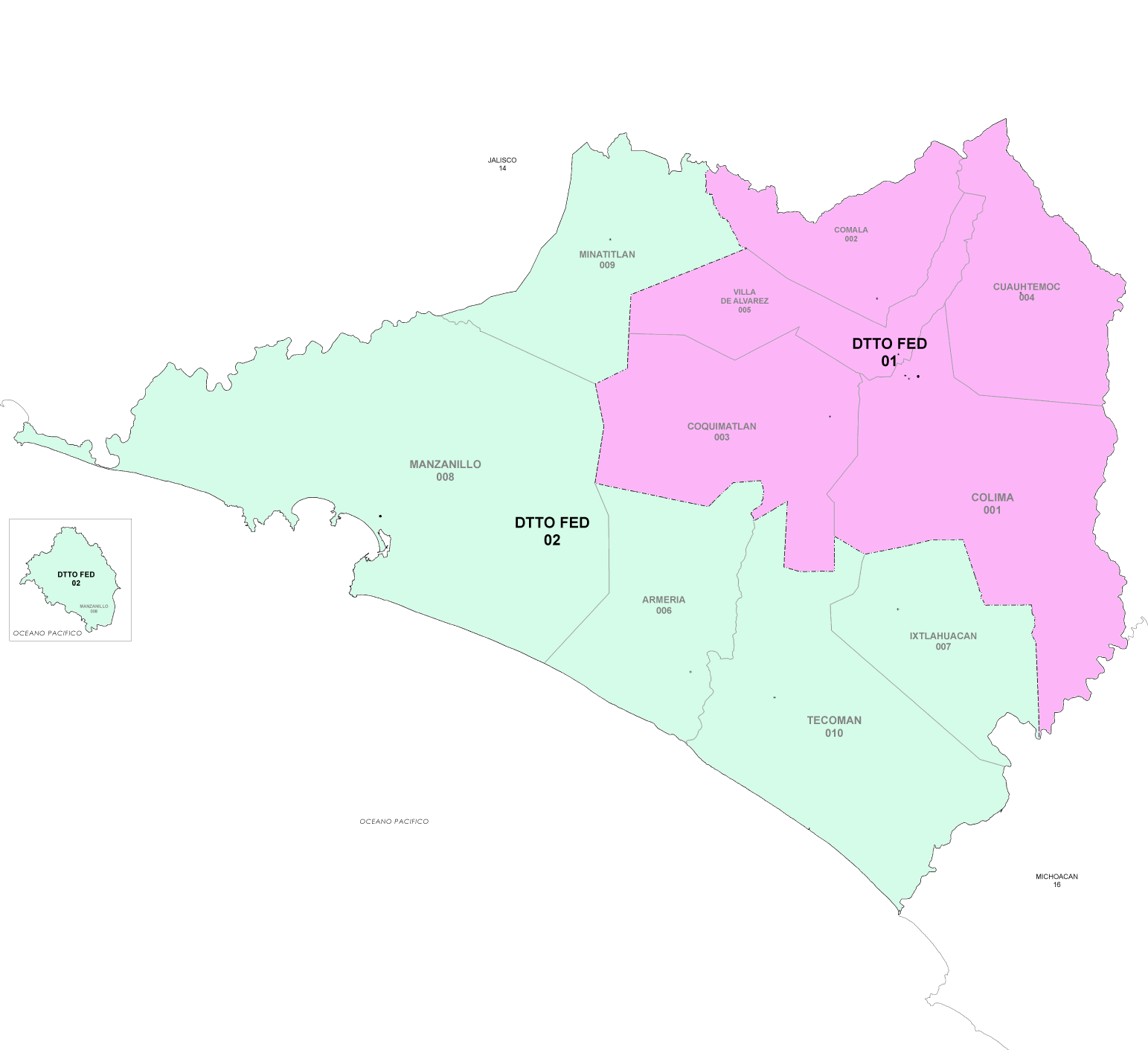
Federal electoral districts of Colima since 2023

District	Head town
1st federal electoral district of Colima	Colima
2nd federal electoral district of Colima	Manzanillo

=== Durango ===
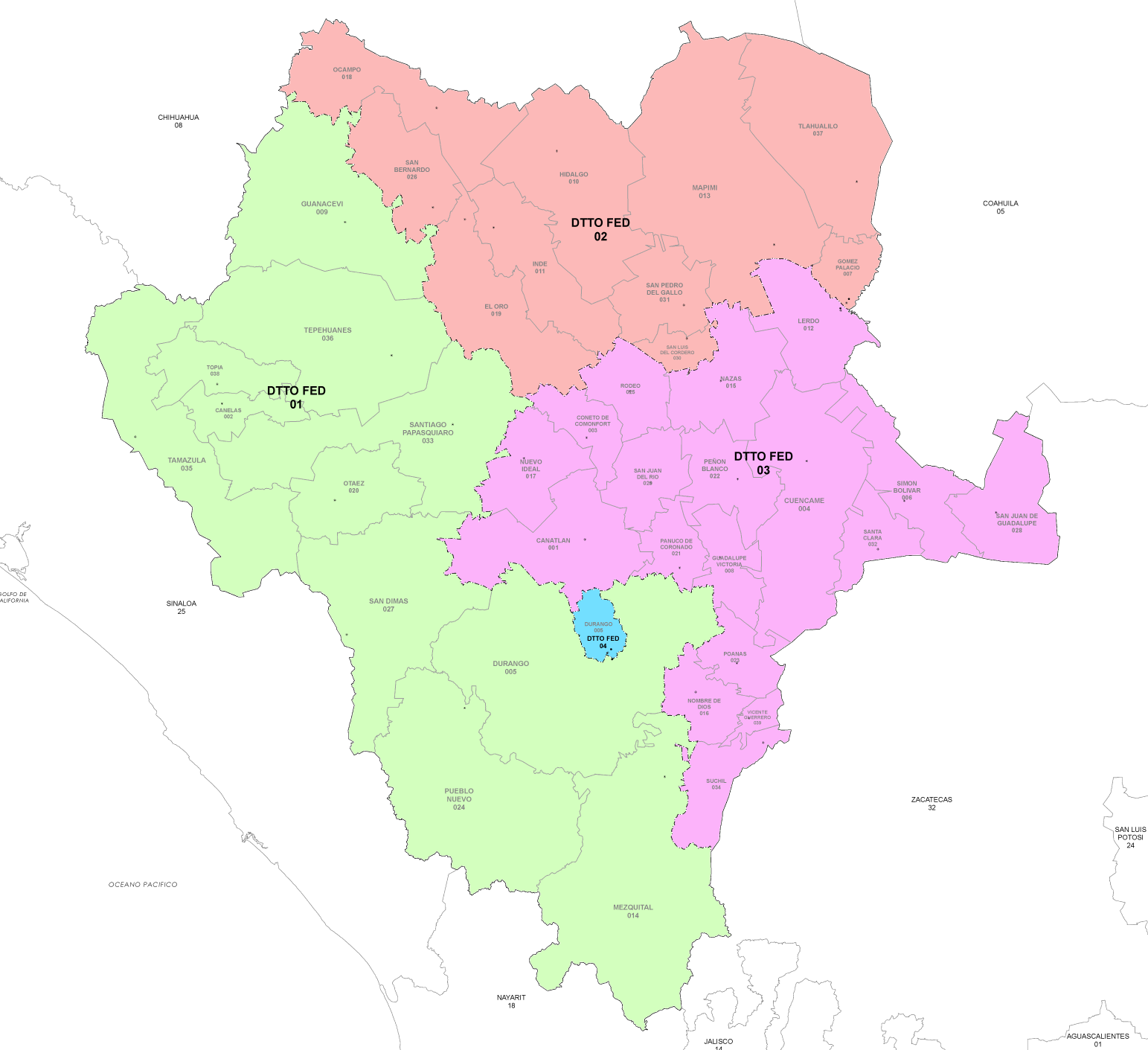
Federal electoral districts of Durango since 2023

District	Head town
1st federal electoral district of Durango	Victoria de Durango
2nd federal electoral district of Durango	Lerdo
3rd federal electoral district of Durango	Guadalupe Victoria
4th federal electoral district of Durango	Victoria de Durango
5th federal electoral district of Durango	Defunct since 2005
6th federal electoral district of Durango	Defunct since 1996
The 7th and 8th districts have been defunct since 1930

=== Guanajuato ===
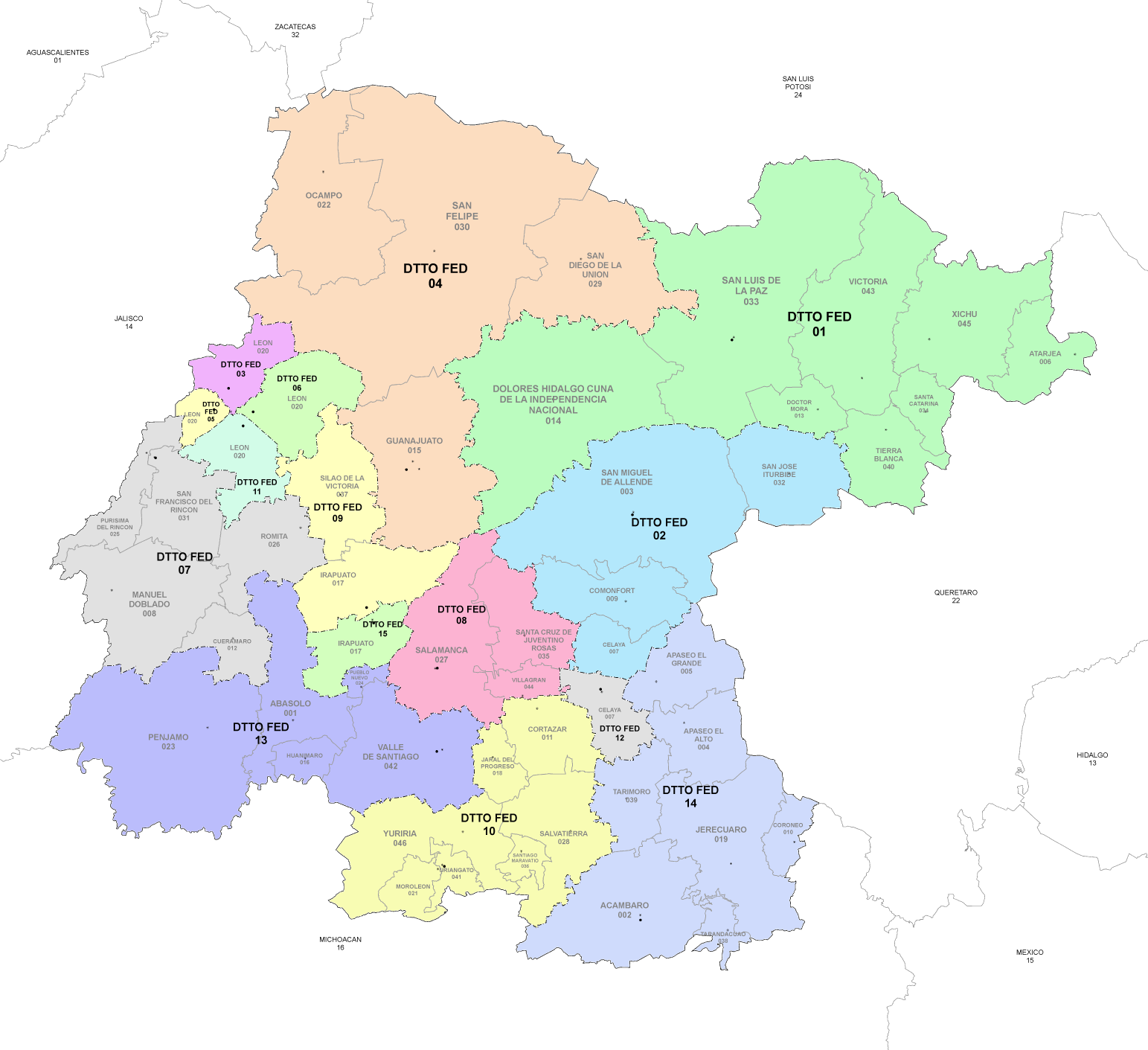
Federal electoral districts of Guanajuato since 2023

District	Head town
1st federal electoral district of Guanajuato	San Luis de la Paz
2nd federal electoral district of Guanajuato	San Miguel de Allende
3rd federal electoral district of Guanajuato	León
4th federal electoral district of Guanajuato	Guanajuato
5th federal electoral district of Guanajuato	León
6th federal electoral district of Guanajuato	León
7th federal electoral district of Guanajuato	San Francisco del Rincón
8th federal electoral district of Guanajuato	Salamanca
9th federal electoral district of Guanajuato	Irapuato
10th federal electoral district of Guanajuato	Uriangato
11th federal electoral district of Guanajuato	León
12th federal electoral district of Guanajuato	Celaya
13th federal electoral district of Guanajuato	Valle de Santiago
14th federal electoral district of Guanajuato	Acámbaro
15th federal electoral district of Guanajuato	Irapuato
The 16th to 18th districts have been defunct since 1930

=== Guerrero ===
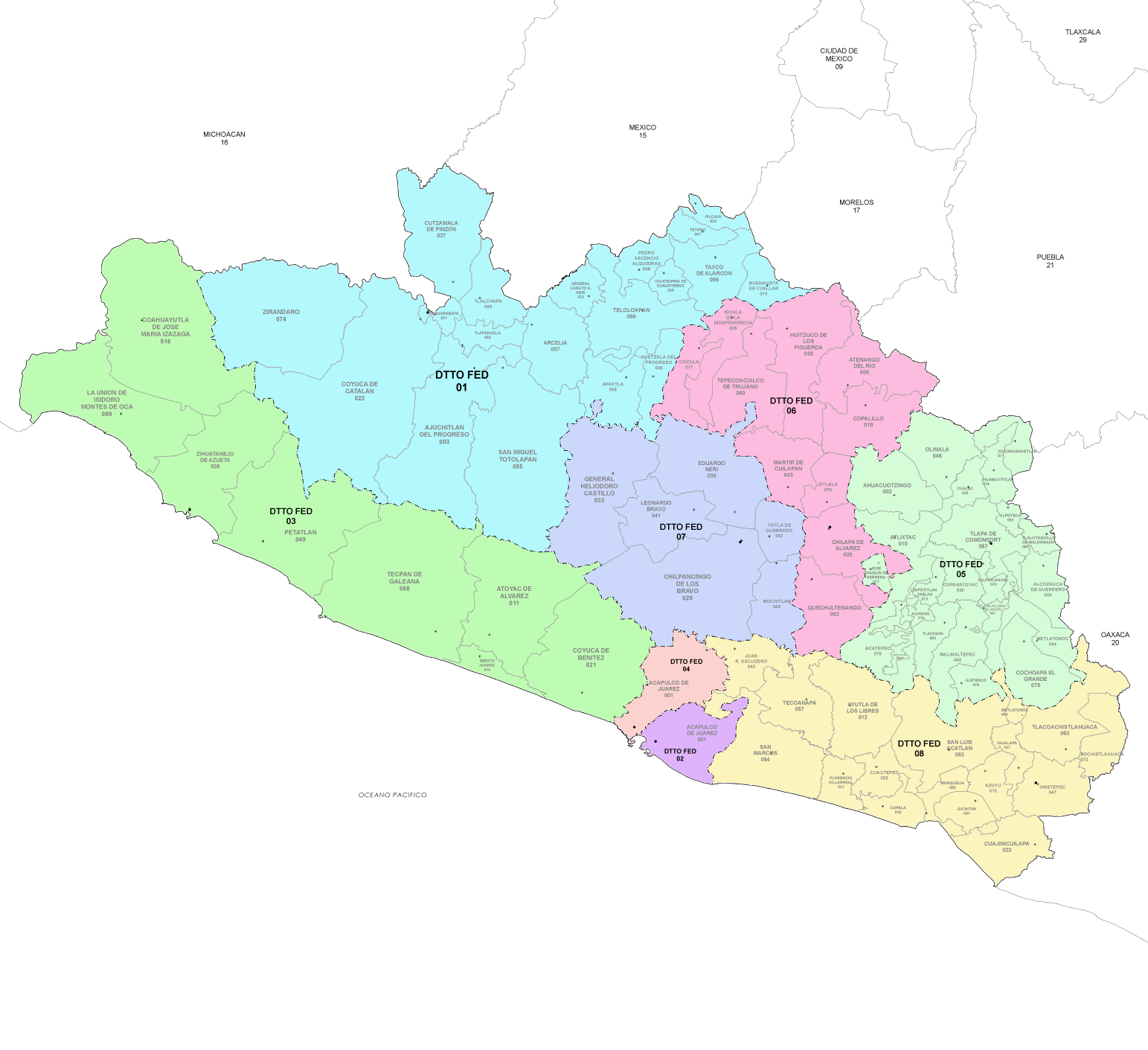
Federal electoral districts of Guerrero since 2023

District	Head town
1st federal electoral district of Guerrero	Ciudad Altamirano
2nd federal electoral district of Guerrero	Iguala
3rd federal electoral district of Guerrero	Zihuatanejo
4th federal electoral district of Guerrero	Acapulco
5th federal electoral district of Guerrero	Tlapa de Comonfort
6th federal electoral district of Guerrero	Chilapa de Álvarez
7th federal electoral district of Guerrero	Chilpancingo
8th federal electoral district of Guerrero	Ometepec
9th federal electoral district of Guerrero	Defunct since 2023
10th federal electoral district of Guerrero	Defunct since 2005

=== Hidalgo ===
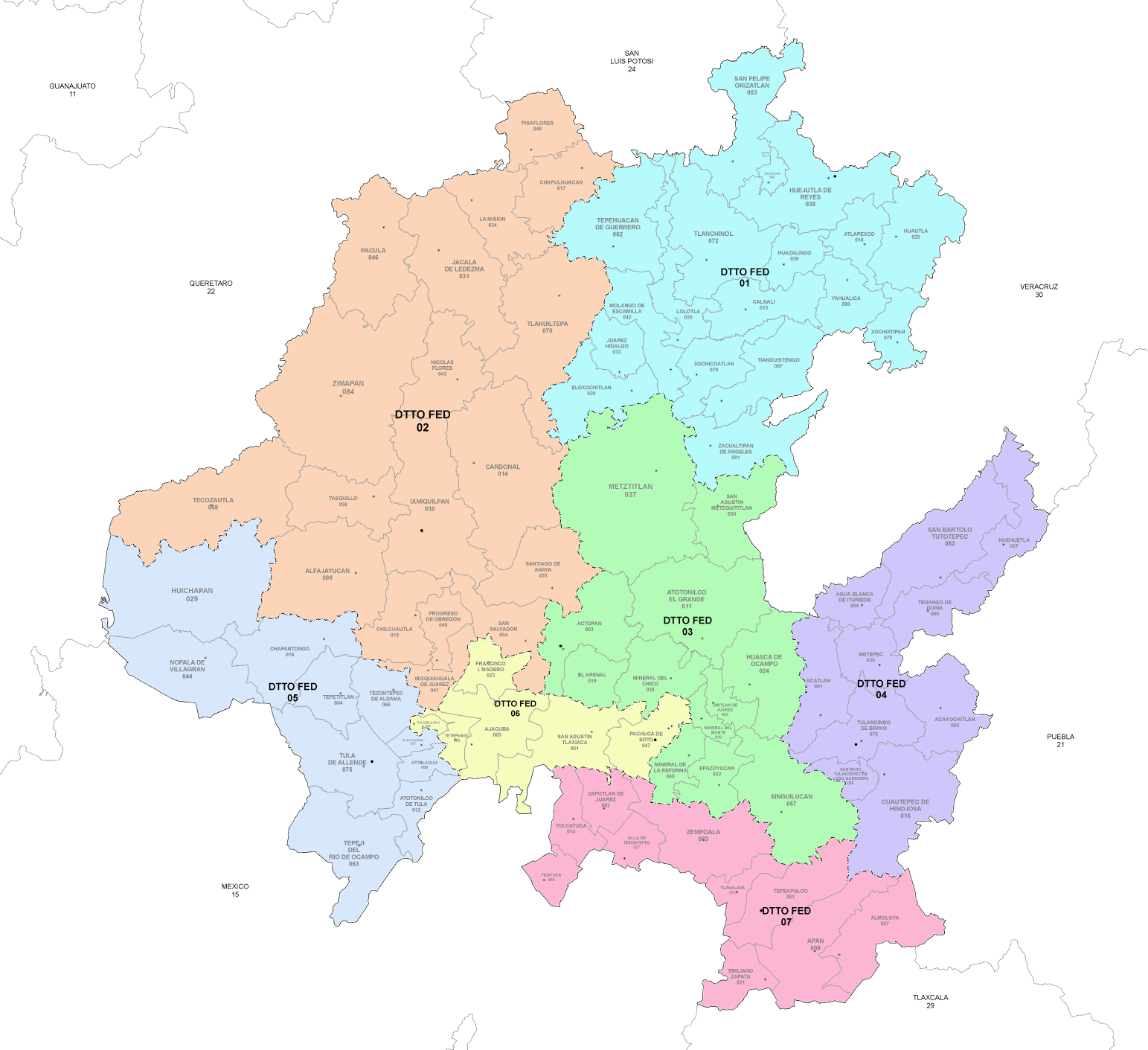
Federal electoral districts of Hidalgo since 2023

District	Head town
1st federal electoral district of Hidalgo	Huejutla
2nd federal electoral district of Hidalgo	Ixmiquilpan
3rd federal electoral district of Hidalgo	Actopan
4th federal electoral district of Hidalgo	Tulancingo
5th federal electoral district of Hidalgo	Tula
6th federal electoral district of Hidalgo	Pachuca
7th federal electoral district of Hidalgo	Tepeapulco
The 8th to 11th districts have been defunct since 1930

=== Jalisco ===
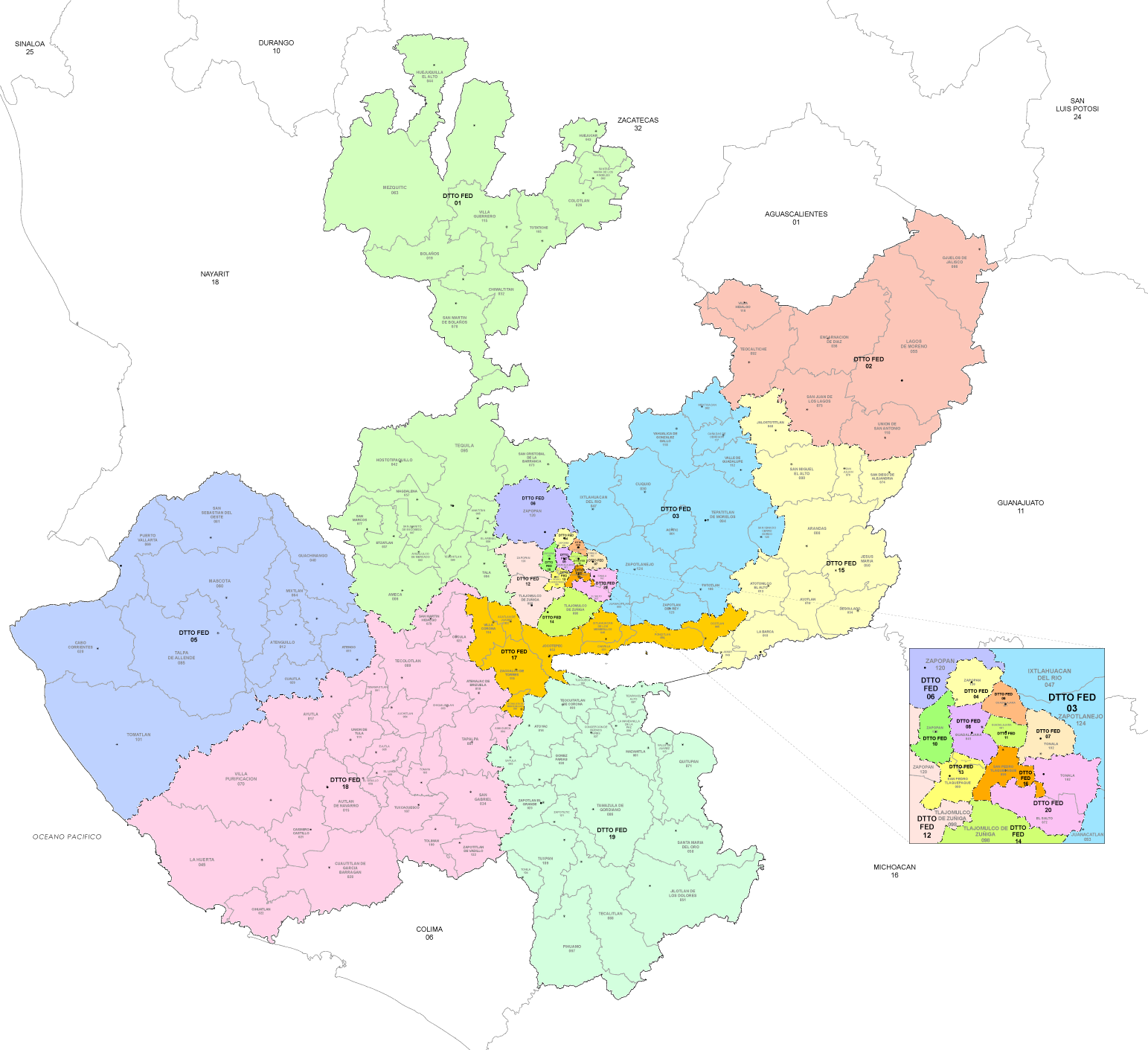
Federal electoral districts of Jalisco since 2023

District	Head town
1st federal electoral district of Jalisco	Tequila
2nd federal electoral district of Jalisco	Lagos de Moreno
3rd federal electoral district of Jalisco	Tepatitlán
4th federal electoral district of Jalisco	Zapopan
5th federal electoral district of Jalisco	Puerto Vallarta
6th federal electoral district of Jalisco	Nuevo México
7th federal electoral district of Jalisco	Tonalá
8th federal electoral district of Jalisco	Guadalajara
9th federal electoral district of Jalisco	Guadalajara
10th federal electoral district of Jalisco	Zapopan
11th federal electoral district of Jalisco	Guadalajara
12th federal electoral district of Jalisco	Santa Cruz de las Flores
13th federal electoral district of Jalisco	Tlaquepaque
14th federal electoral district of Jalisco	Tlajomulco de Zúñiga
15th federal electoral district of Jalisco	La Barca
16th federal electoral district of Jalisco	Tlaquepaque
17th federal electoral district of Jalisco	Jocotepec
18th federal electoral district of Jalisco	Autlán de Navarro
19th federal electoral district of Jalisco	Ciudad Guzmán
20th federal electoral district of Jalisco	Tonalá
The 21st to 23rd districts have been defunct since 1930

=== Mexico City ===
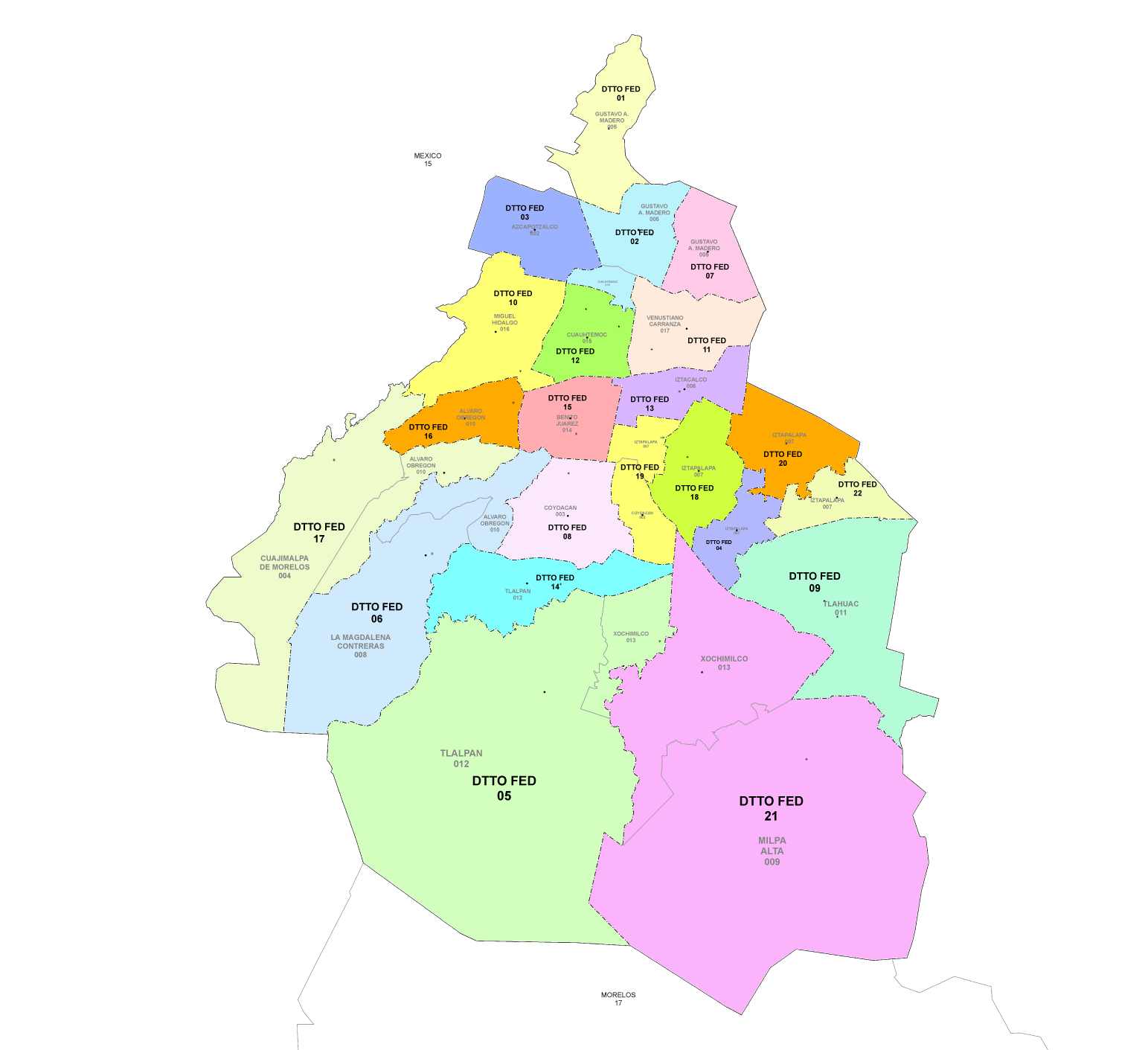
Federal electoral districts of Mexico City since 2023

District	Head town
1st federal electoral district of Mexico City	Gustavo A. Madero
2nd federal electoral district of Mexico City	Gustavo A. Madero
3rd federal electoral district of Mexico City	Azcapotzalco
4th federal electoral district of Mexico City	Iztapalapa
5th federal electoral district of Mexico City	Tlalpan
6th federal electoral district of Mexico City	Magdalena Contreras
7th federal electoral district of Mexico City	Gustavo A. Madero
8th federal electoral district of Mexico City	Coyoacán
9th federal electoral district of Mexico City	Tláhuac
10th federal electoral district of Mexico City	Miguel Hidalgo
11th federal electoral district of Mexico City	Venustiano Carranza
12th federal electoral district of Mexico City	Cuauhtémoc
13th federal electoral district of Mexico City	Iztacalco
14th federal electoral district of Mexico City	Tlalpan
15th federal electoral district of Mexico City	Benito Juárez
16th federal electoral district of Mexico City	Álvaro Obregón
17th federal electoral district of Mexico City	Álvaro Obregón
18th federal electoral district of Mexico City	Iztapalapa
19th federal electoral district of Mexico City	Coyoacán
20th federal electoral district of Mexico City	Iztapalapa
21st federal electoral district of Mexico City	Milpa Alta
22nd federal electoral district of Mexico City	Xochimilco
23rd federal electoral district of Mexico City	Defunct since 2023
24th federal electoral district of Mexico City	Defunct since 2023
25th federal electoral district of the Federal District	Defunct since 2017
26th federal electoral district of the Federal District	Defunct since 2017
27th federal electoral district of the Federal District	Defunct since 2017
28th federal electoral district of the Federal District	Defunct since 2005
29th federal electoral district of the Federal District	Defunct since 2005
30th federal electoral district of the Federal District	Defunct since 2005
31st federal electoral district of the Federal District	Defunct since 1996
32nd federal electoral district of the Federal District	Defunct since 1996
33rd federal electoral district of the Federal District	Defunct since 1996
34th federal electoral district of the Federal District	Defunct since 1996
35th federal electoral district of the Federal District	Defunct since 1996
36th federal electoral district of the Federal District	Defunct since 1996
37th federal electoral district of the Federal District	Defunct since 1996
38th federal electoral district of the Federal District	Defunct since 1996
39th federal electoral district of the Federal District	Defunct since 1996
40th federal electoral district of the Federal District	Defunct since 1996

=== State of Mexico ===
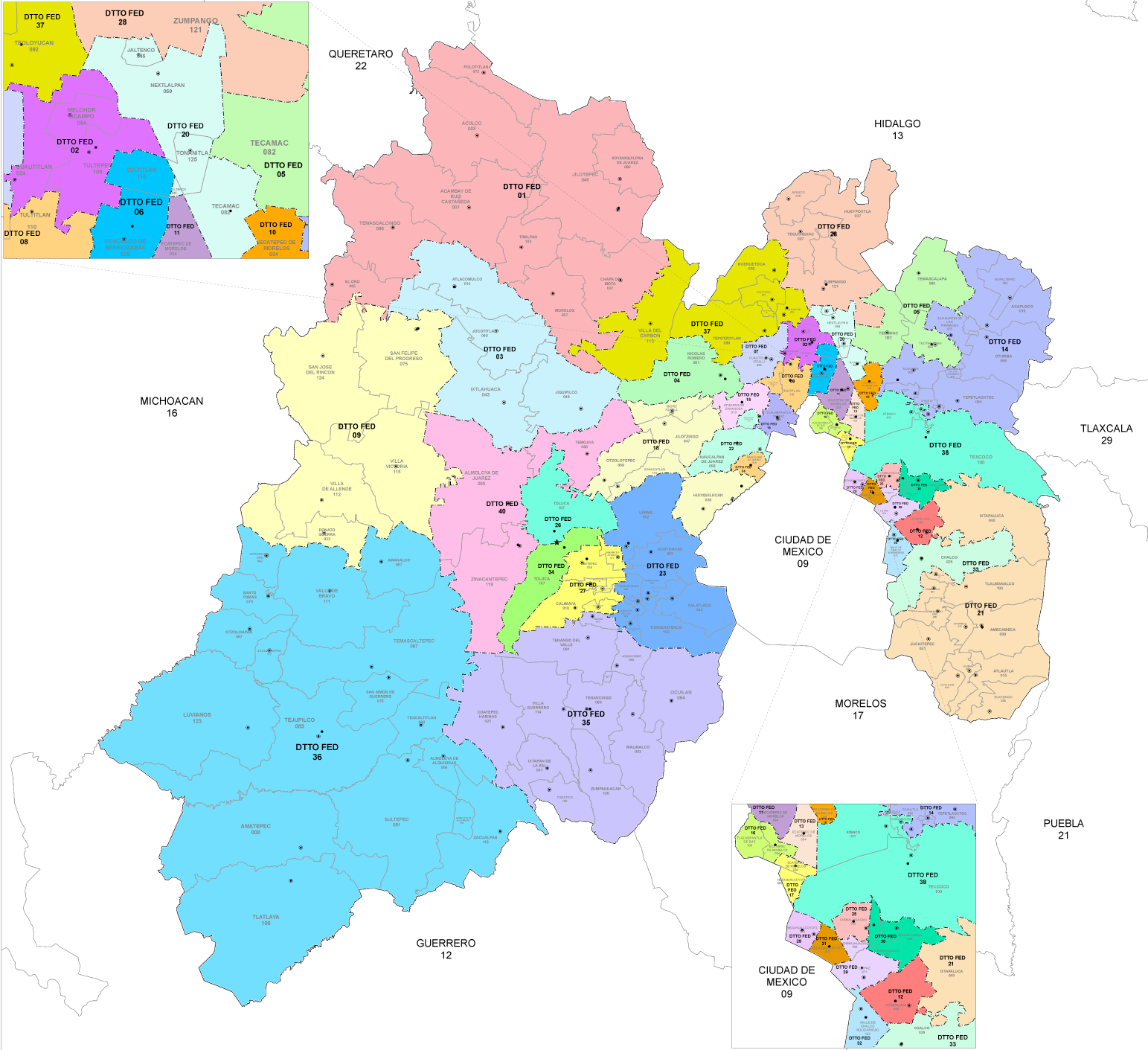
Federal electoral districts of the State of Mexico since 2023

District	Head town
1st federal electoral district of the State of Mexico	Jilotepec
2nd federal electoral district of the State of Mexico	Tultepec
3rd federal electoral district of the State of Mexico	Atlacomulco
4th federal electoral district of the State of Mexico	Ciudad Nicolás Romero
5th federal electoral district of the State of Mexico	Teotihuacán
6th federal electoral district of the State of Mexico	Coacalco
7th federal electoral district of the State of Mexico	Cuautitlán Izcalli
8th federal electoral district of the State of Mexico	Tultitlán
9th federal electoral district of the State of Mexico	San Felipe del Progreso
10th federal electoral district of the State of Mexico	Ecatepec
11th federal electoral district of the State of Mexico	Ecatepec
12th federal electoral district of the State of Mexico	Ixtapaluca
13th federal electoral district of the State of Mexico	Ecatepec
14th federal electoral district of the State of Mexico	Tepexpan
15th federal electoral district of the State of Mexico	Ciudad López Mateos
16th federal electoral district of the State of Mexico	Ecatepec
17th federal electoral district of the State of Mexico	Ecatepec
18th federal electoral district of the State of Mexico	Huixquilucan
19th federal electoral district of the State of Mexico	Tlalnepantla de Baz
20th federal electoral district of the State of Mexico	Ojo de Agua
21st federal electoral district of the State of Mexico	Naucalpan
22nd federal electoral district of the State of Mexico	Naucalpan
23rd federal electoral district of the State of Mexico	Lerma
24th federal electoral district of the State of Mexico	Naucalpan
25th federal electoral district of the State of Mexico	Chimalhuacán
26th federal electoral district of the State of Mexico	Toluca
27th federal electoral district of the State of Mexico	Metepec
28th federal electoral district of the State of Mexico	Zumpango
29th federal electoral district of the State of Mexico	Ciudad Nezahualcóyotl
30th federal electoral district of the State of Mexico	Chimalhuacán
31st federal electoral district of the State of Mexico	Ciudad Nezahualcóyotl
32nd federal electoral district of the State of Mexico	Valle de Chalco Solidaridad
33rd federal electoral district of the State of Mexico	Chalco
34th federal electoral district of the State of Mexico	Naucalpan
35th federal electoral district of the State of Mexico	Chimalhuacán
36th federal electoral district of the State of Mexico	Toluca
37th federal electoral district of the State of Mexico	Metepec
38th federal electoral district of the State of Mexico	Texcoco de Mora
39th federal electoral district of the State of Mexico	La Paz
40th federal electoral district of the State of Mexico	Zinacantepec
41st federal electoral district of the State of Mexico	Defunct since 2023

=== Michoacán ===
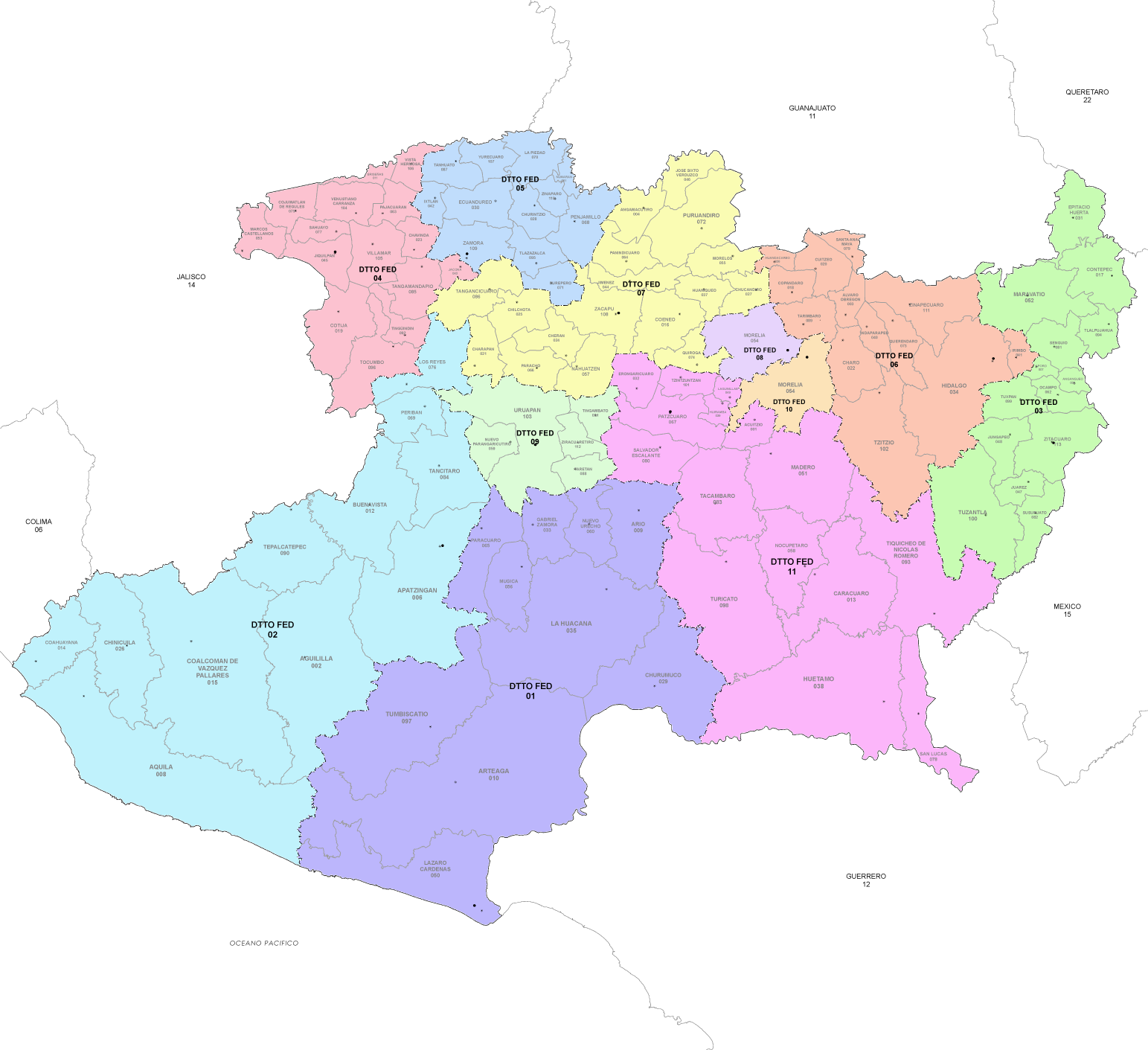
Federal electoral districts of Michoacán since 2023

District	Head town
1st federal electoral district of Michoacán	Lázaro Cárdenas
2nd federal electoral district of Michoacán	Apatzingán
3rd federal electoral district of Michoacán	Zitácuaro
4th federal electoral district of Michoacán	Jiquilpan
5th federal electoral district of Michoacán	Zamora de Hidalgo
6th federal electoral district of Michoacán	Ciudad Hidalgo
7th federal electoral district of Michoacán	Zacapú
8th federal electoral district of Michoacán	Morelia
9th federal electoral district of Michoacán	Uruapan
10th federal electoral district of Michoacán	Morelia
11th federal electoral district of Michoacán	Pátzcuaro
12th federal electoral district of Michoacán	Defunct since 2023
13th federal electoral district of Michoacán	Defunct since 2005
The 14th to 19th districts have been defunct since 1930

=== Morelos ===
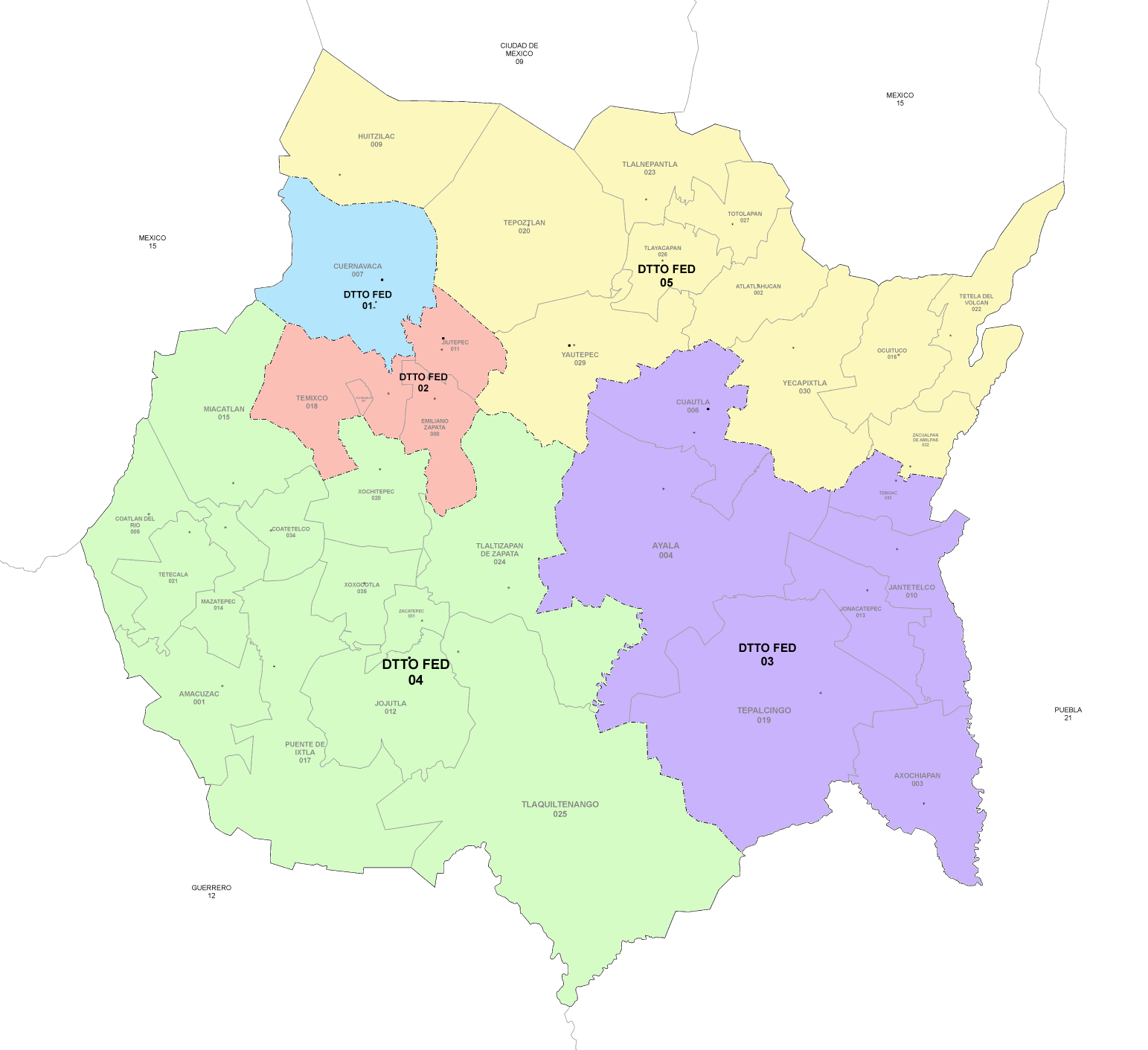
Federal electoral districts of Morelos since 2023

District	Head town
1st federal electoral district of Morelos	Cuernavaca
2nd federal electoral district of Morelos	Jiutepec
3rd federal electoral district of Morelos	Cuautla
4th federal electoral district of Morelos	Jojutla
5th federal electoral district of Morelos	Yautepec

=== Nayarit ===
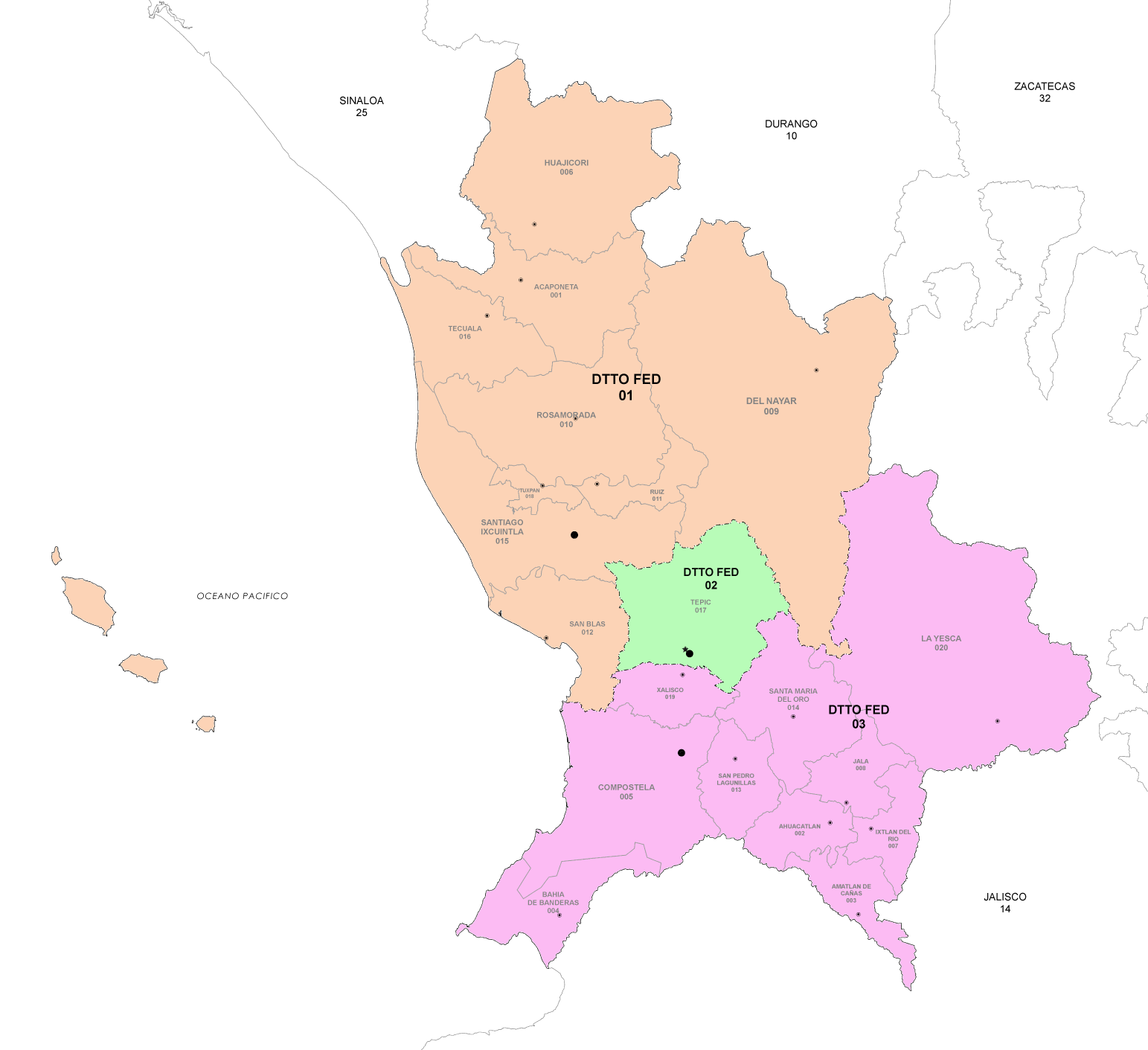
Federal electoral districts of Nayarit since 2023

District	Head town
1st federal electoral district of Nayarit	Santiago Ixcuintla
2nd federal electoral district of Nayarit	Tepic
3rd federal electoral district of Nayarit	Compostela

=== Nuevo León ===
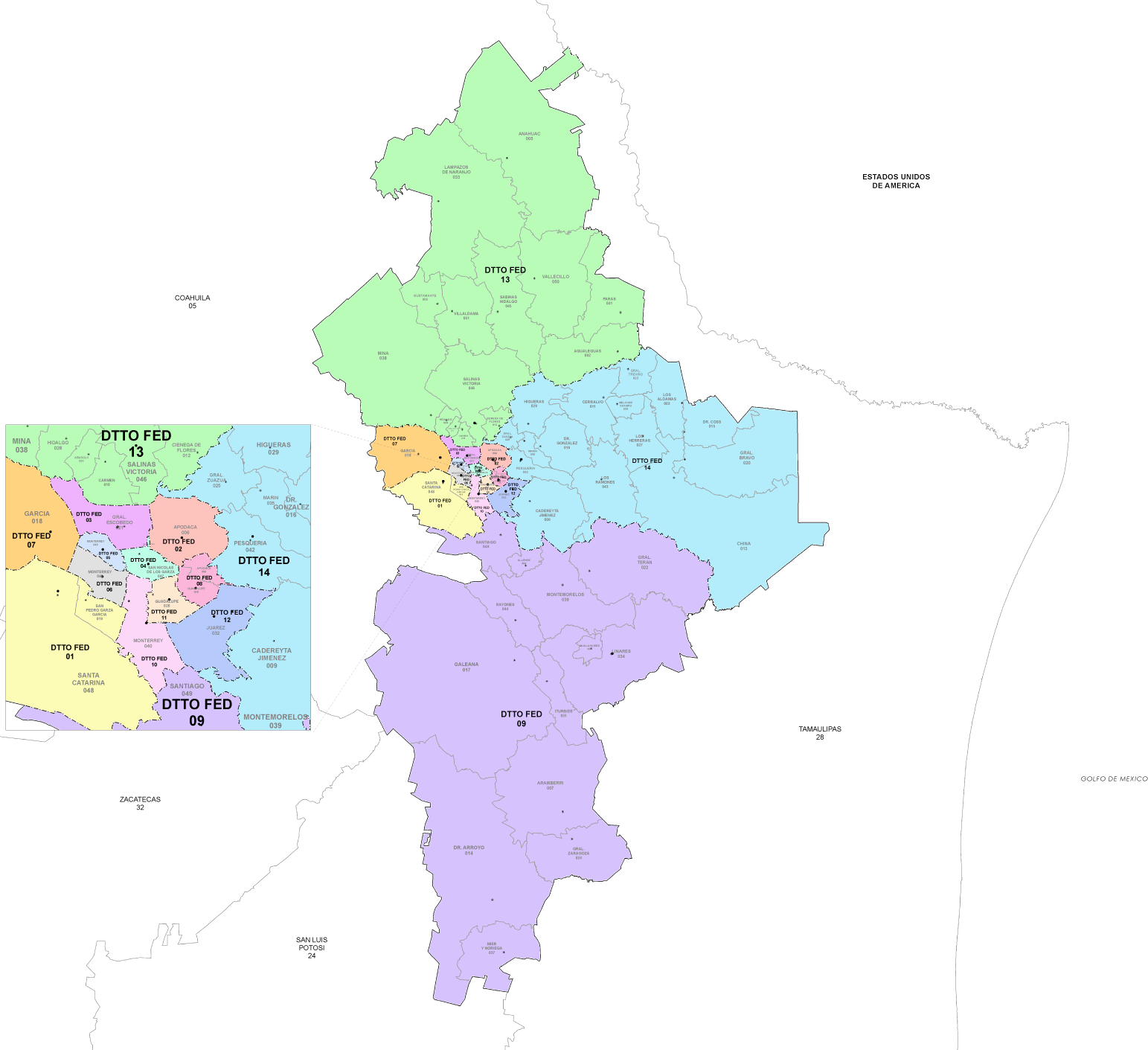
Federal electoral districts of Nuevo León since 2023

District	Head town
1st federal electoral district of Nuevo León	Santa Catarina
2nd federal electoral district of Nuevo León	Apodaca
3rd federal electoral district of Nuevo León	General Escobedo
4th federal electoral district of Nuevo León	San Nicolás de los Garza
5th federal electoral district of Nuevo León	Monterrey
6th federal electoral district of Nuevo León	Monterrey
7th federal electoral district of Nuevo León	García
8th federal electoral district of Nuevo León	Guadalupe
9th federal electoral district of Nuevo León	Linares
10th federal electoral district of Nuevo León	Monterrey
11th federal electoral district of Nuevo León	Guadalupe
12th federal electoral district of Nuevo León	Juárez
13th federal electoral district of Nuevo León	Salinas Victoria
14th federal electoral district of Nuevo León	Pesquería

=== Oaxaca ===
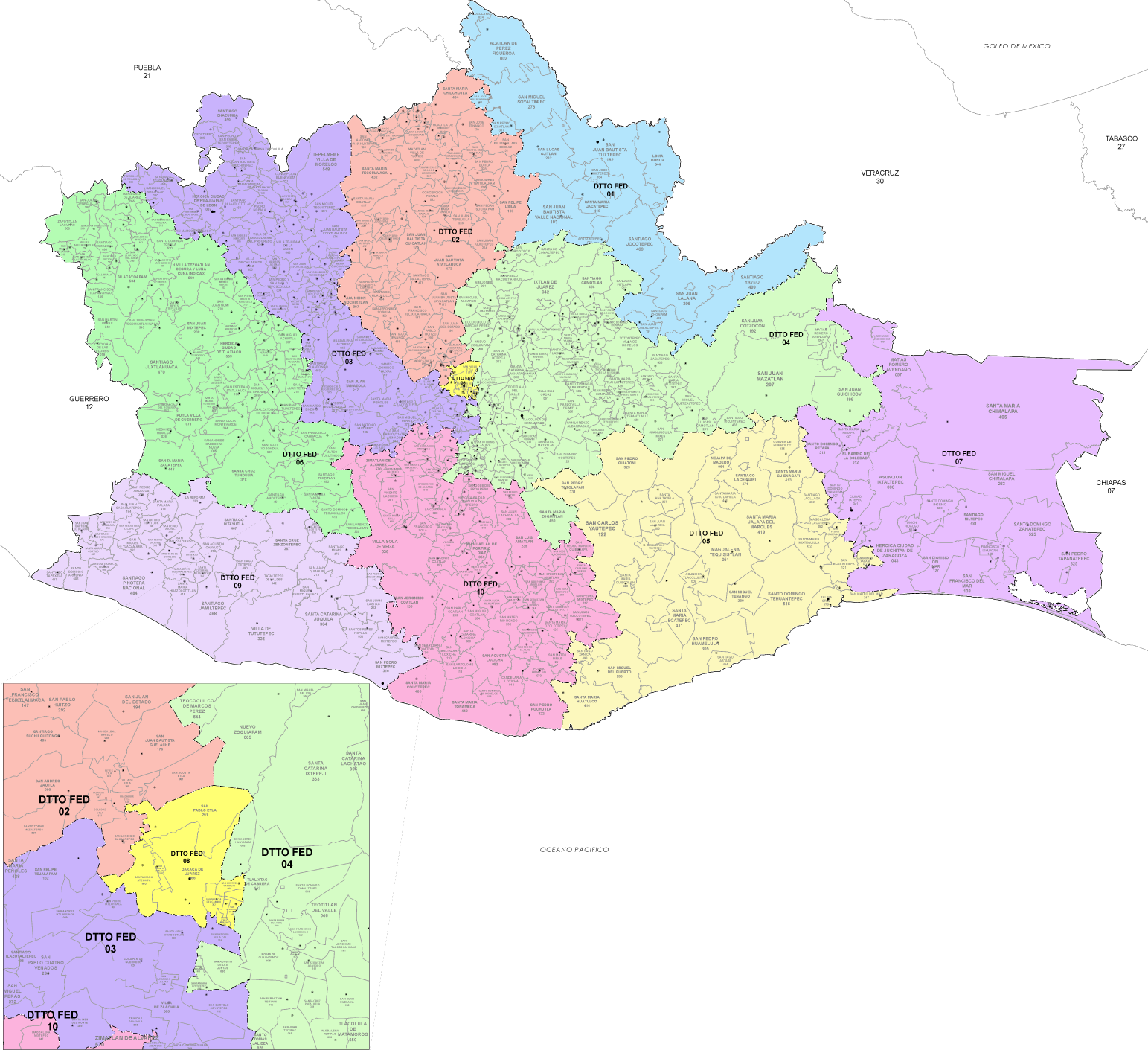
Federal electoral districts of Oaxaca since 2023

District	Head town
1st federal electoral district of Oaxaca	Tuxtepec
2nd federal electoral district of Oaxaca	Teotitlán de Flores Magón
3rd federal electoral district of Oaxaca	Huajuapan de León
4th federal electoral district of Oaxaca	Tlacolula de Matamoros
5th federal electoral district of Oaxaca	Salina Cruz
6th federal electoral district of Oaxaca	Heroica Ciudad de Tlaxiaco
7th federal electoral district of Oaxaca	Ciudad Ixtepec
8th federal electoral district of Oaxaca	Oaxaca de Juárez
9th federal electoral district of Oaxaca	Puerto Escondido
10th federal electoral district of Oaxaca	Miahuatlán de Porfirio Díaz
11th federal electoral district of Oaxaca	Defunct since 2017

=== Puebla ===
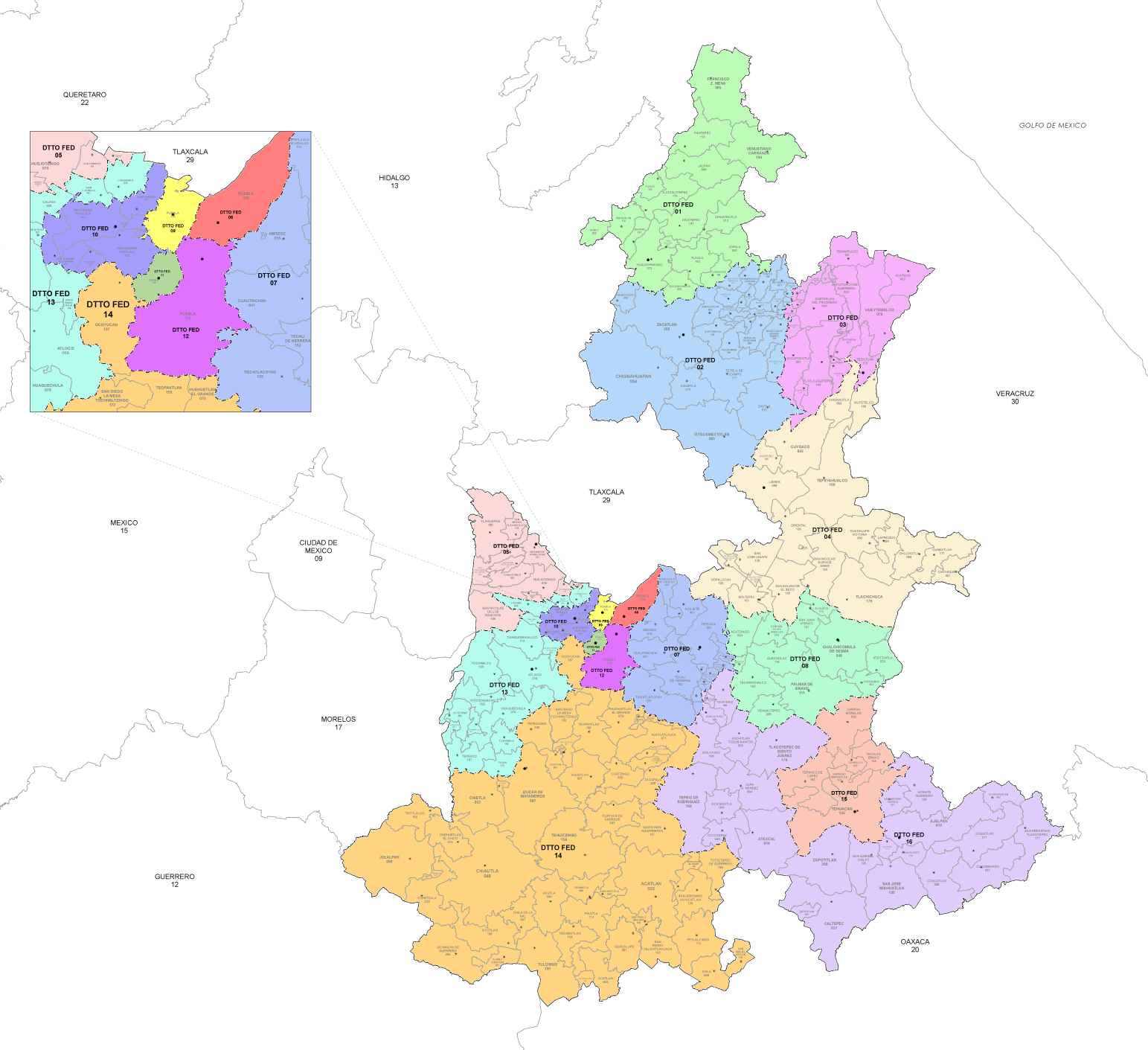
Federal electoral districts of Puebla since 2023

District	Head town
1st federal electoral district of Puebla	Huauchinango
2nd federal electoral district of Puebla	Zacatlán
3rd federal electoral district of Puebla	Teziutlán
4th federal electoral district of Puebla	Libres
5th federal electoral district of Puebla	San Martín Texmelucan
6th federal electoral district of Puebla	Puebla de Zaragoza
7th federal electoral district of Puebla	Tepeaca
8th federal electoral district of Puebla	Ciudad Serdán
9th federal electoral district of Puebla	Puebla de Zaragoza
10th federal electoral district of Puebla	Cholula
11th federal electoral district of Puebla	Puebla de Zaragoza
12th federal electoral district of Puebla	Puebla de Zaragoza
13th federal electoral district of Puebla	Atlixco
14th federal electoral district of Puebla	Izúcar de Matamoros
15th federal electoral district of Puebla	Tehuacán
16th federal electoral district of Puebla	Ajalpan
The 17th to 21st districts have been defunct since 1930

=== Querétaro ===
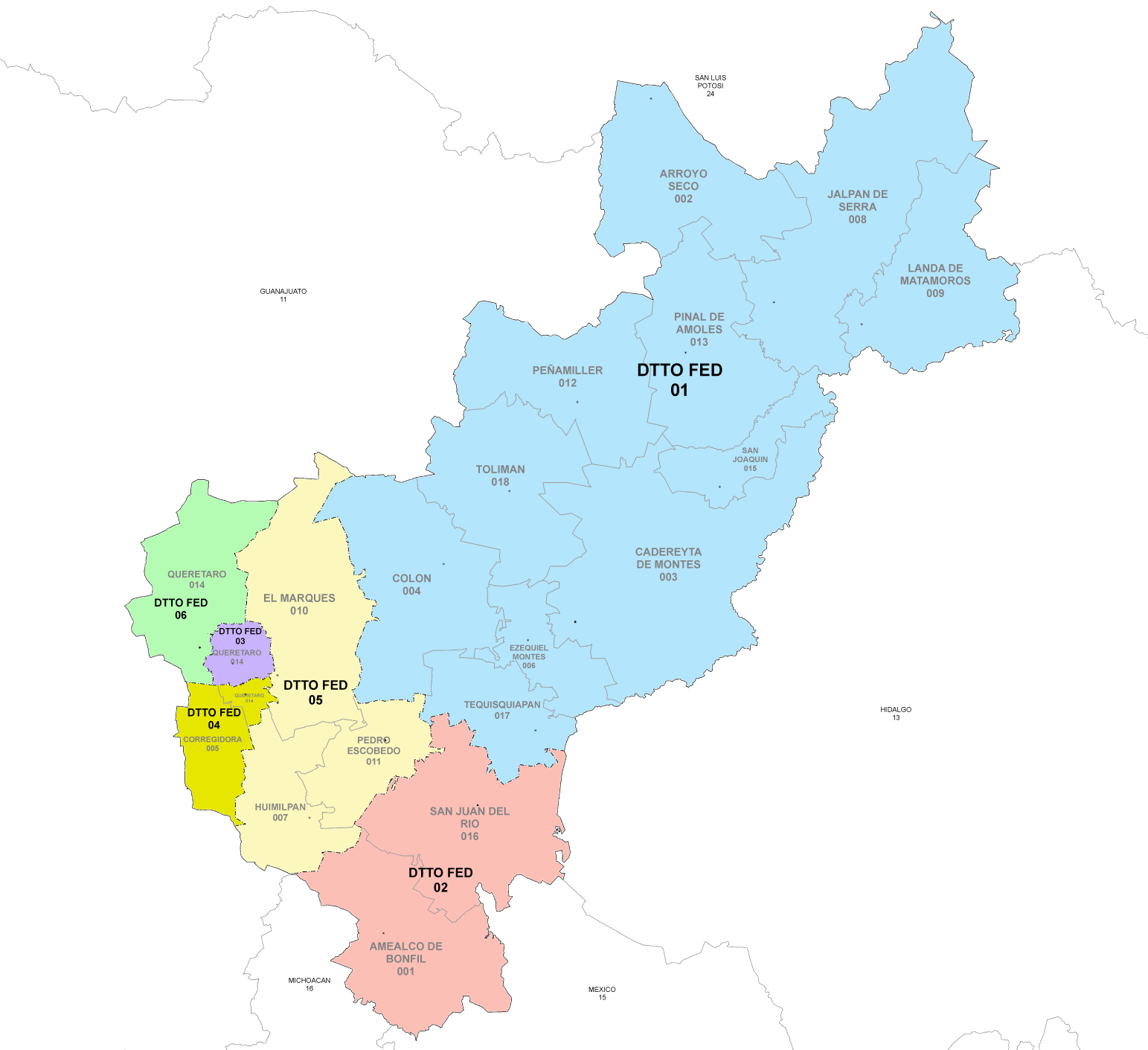
Federal electoral districts of Querétaro since 2023

District	Head town
1st federal electoral district of Querétaro	Cadereyta de Montes
2nd federal electoral district of Querétaro	San Juan del Río
3rd federal electoral district of Querétaro	Santiago de Querétaro
4th federal electoral district of Querétaro	Santiago de Querétaro
5th federal electoral district of Querétaro	Pedro Escobedo
6th federal electoral district of Querétaro	Santiago de Querétaro

=== Quintana Roo ===
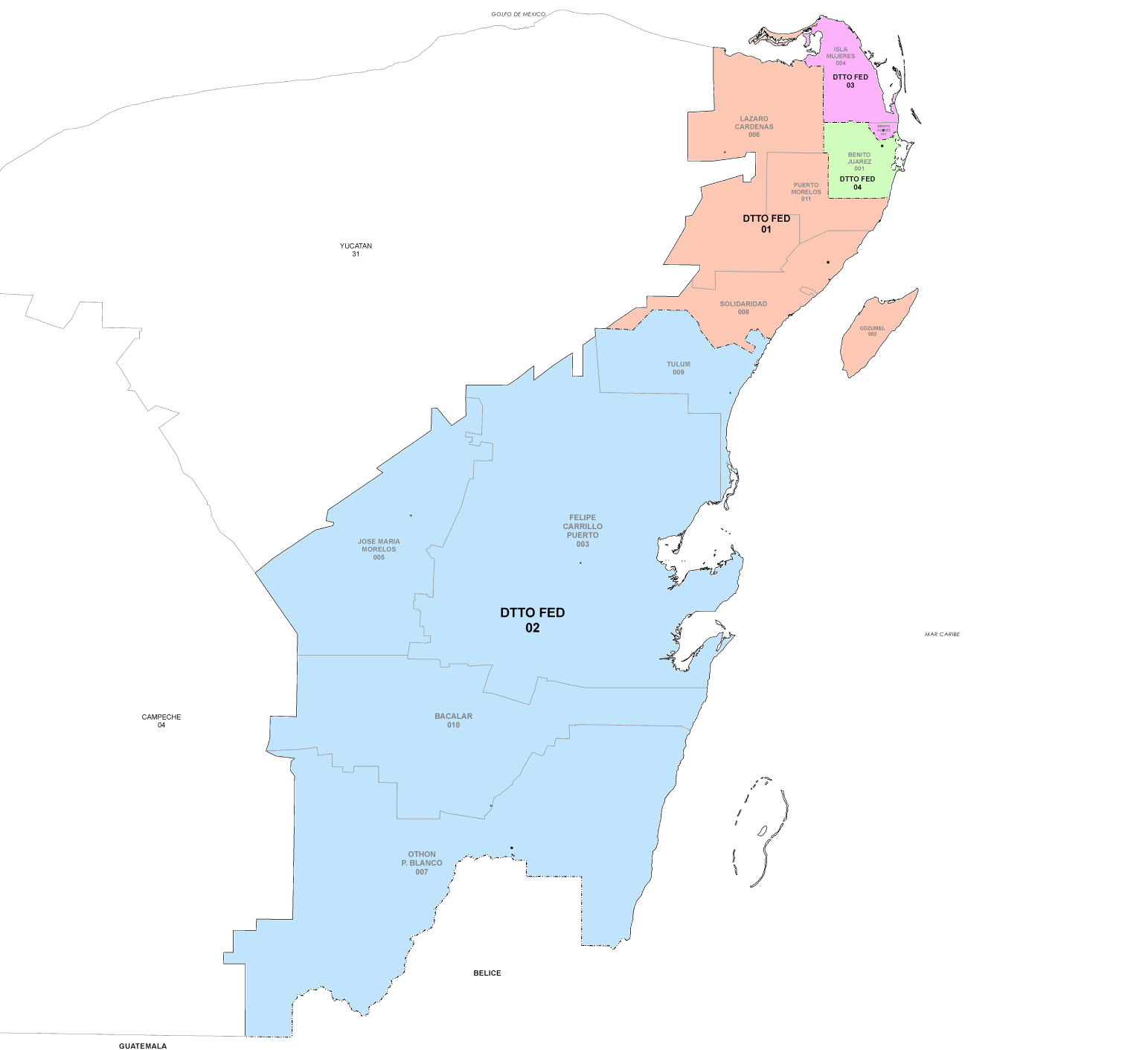
Federal electoral districts of Quintana Roo since 2023

District	Head town
1st federal electoral district of Quintana Roo	Playa del Carmen
2nd federal electoral district of Quintana Roo	Chetumal
3rd federal electoral district of Quintana Roo	Cancún
4th federal electoral district of Quintana Roo	Cancún

=== San Luis Potosí ===
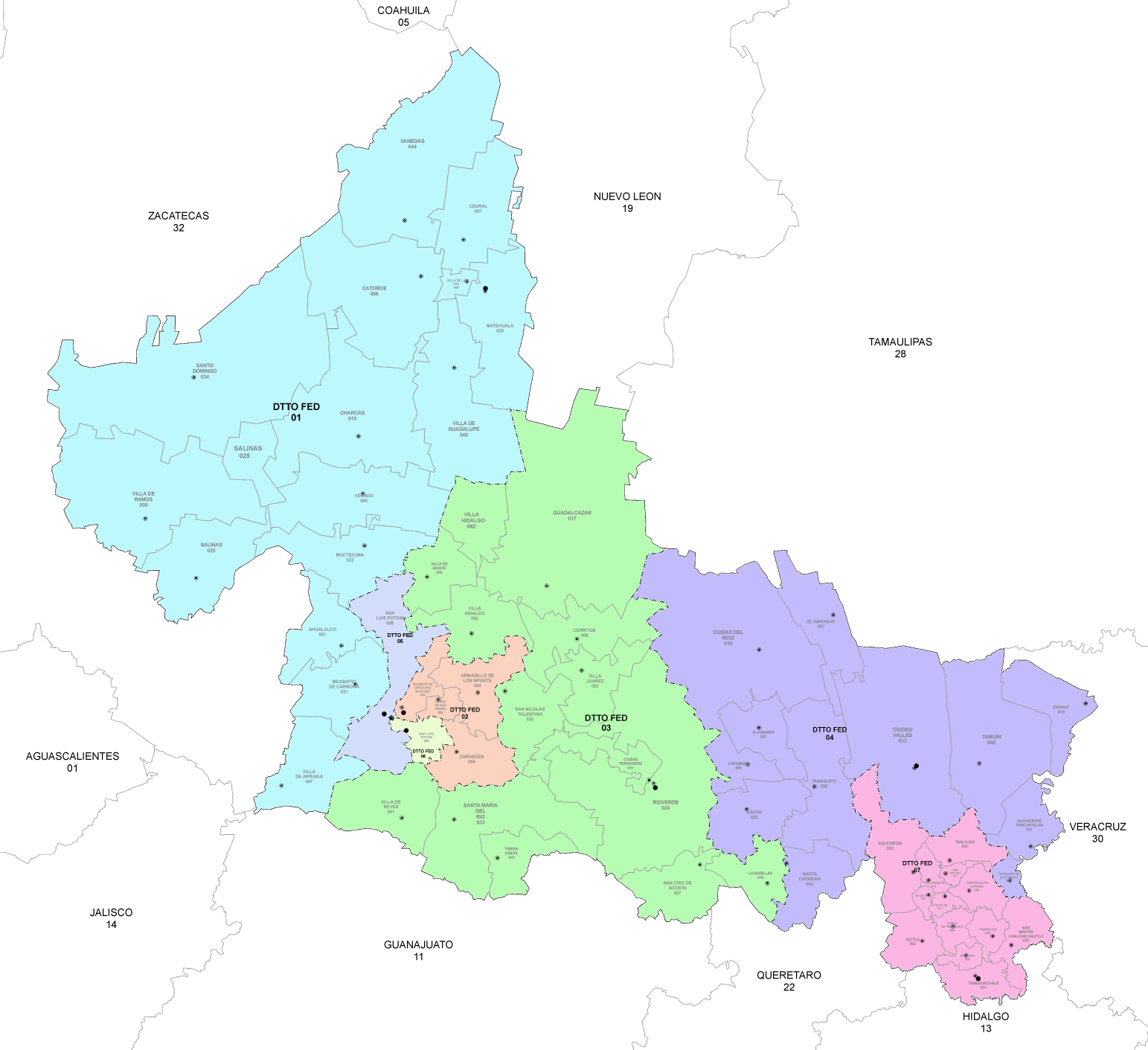
Federal electoral districts of San Luis Potosí since 2023

District	Head town
1st federal electoral district of San Luis Potosí	Matehuala
2nd federal electoral district of San Luis Potosí	Soledad de Graciano Sánchez
3rd federal electoral district of San Luis Potosí	Rioverde
4th federal electoral district of San Luis Potosí	Ciudad Valles
5th federal electoral district of San Luis Potosí	San Luis Potosí
6th federal electoral district of San Luis Potosí	San Luis Potosí
7th federal electoral district of San Luis Potosí	Tamazunchale

=== Sinaloa ===
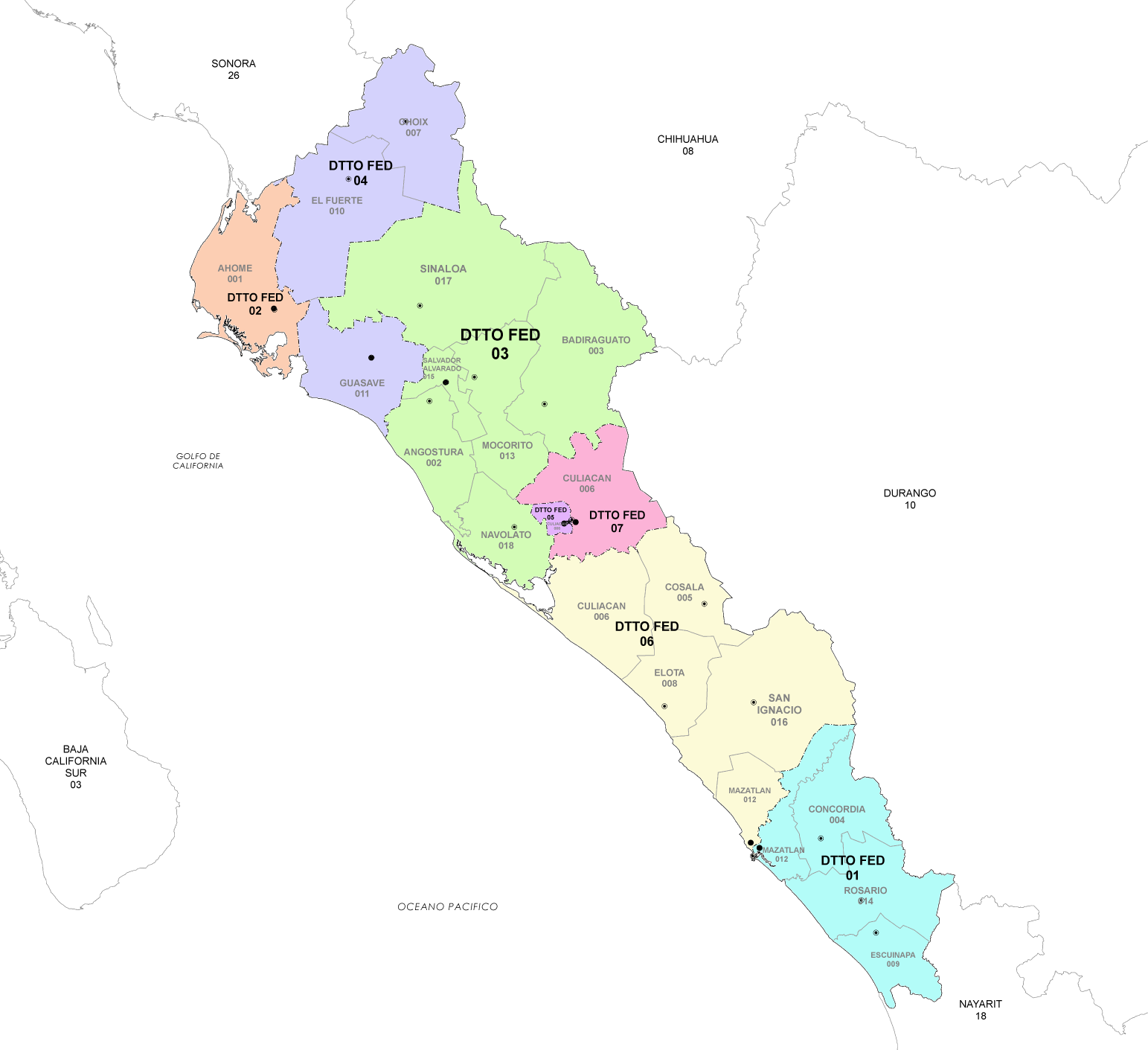
Federal electoral districts of Sinaloa since 2023

District	Head town
1st federal electoral district of Sinaloa	Mazatlán
2nd federal electoral district of Sinaloa	Los Mochis
3rd federal electoral district of Sinaloa	Guamúchil
4th federal electoral district of Sinaloa	Guasave
5th federal electoral district of Sinaloa	Culiacán
6th federal electoral district of Sinaloa	Mazatlán
7th federal electoral district of Sinaloa	Culiacán
8th federal electoral district of Sinaloa	Defunct since 2017
9th federal electoral district of Sinaloa	Defunct since 1996

=== Sonora ===
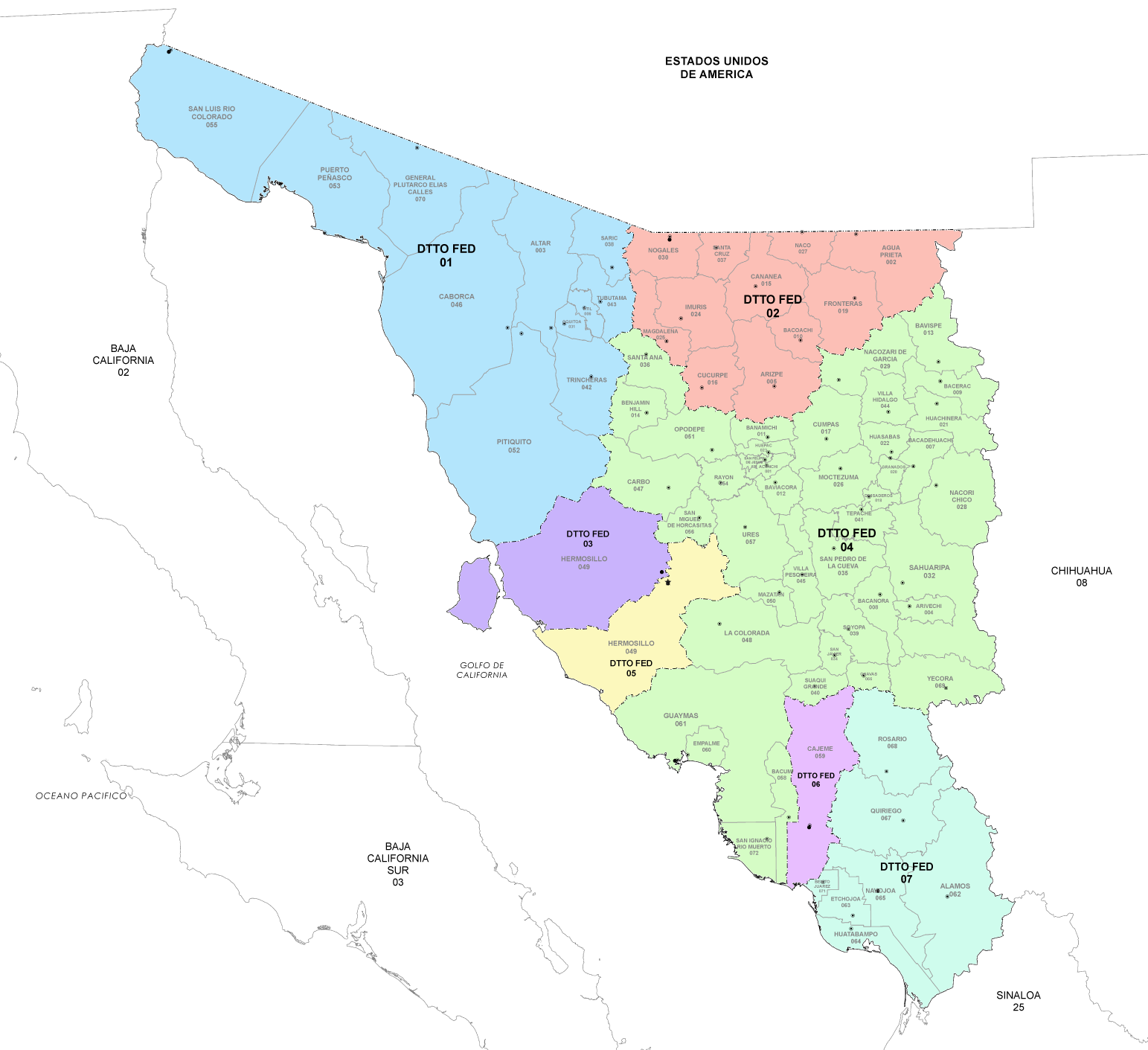
Federal electoral districts of Sonora since 2023

District	Head town
1st federal electoral district of Sonora	San Luis Río Colorado
2nd federal electoral district of Sonora	Nogales
3rd federal electoral district of Sonora	Hermosillo
4th federal electoral district of Sonora	Guaymas
5th federal electoral district of Sonora	Hermosillo
6th federal electoral district of Sonora	Ciudad Obregón
7th federal electoral district of Sonora	Navojoa

=== Tabasco ===
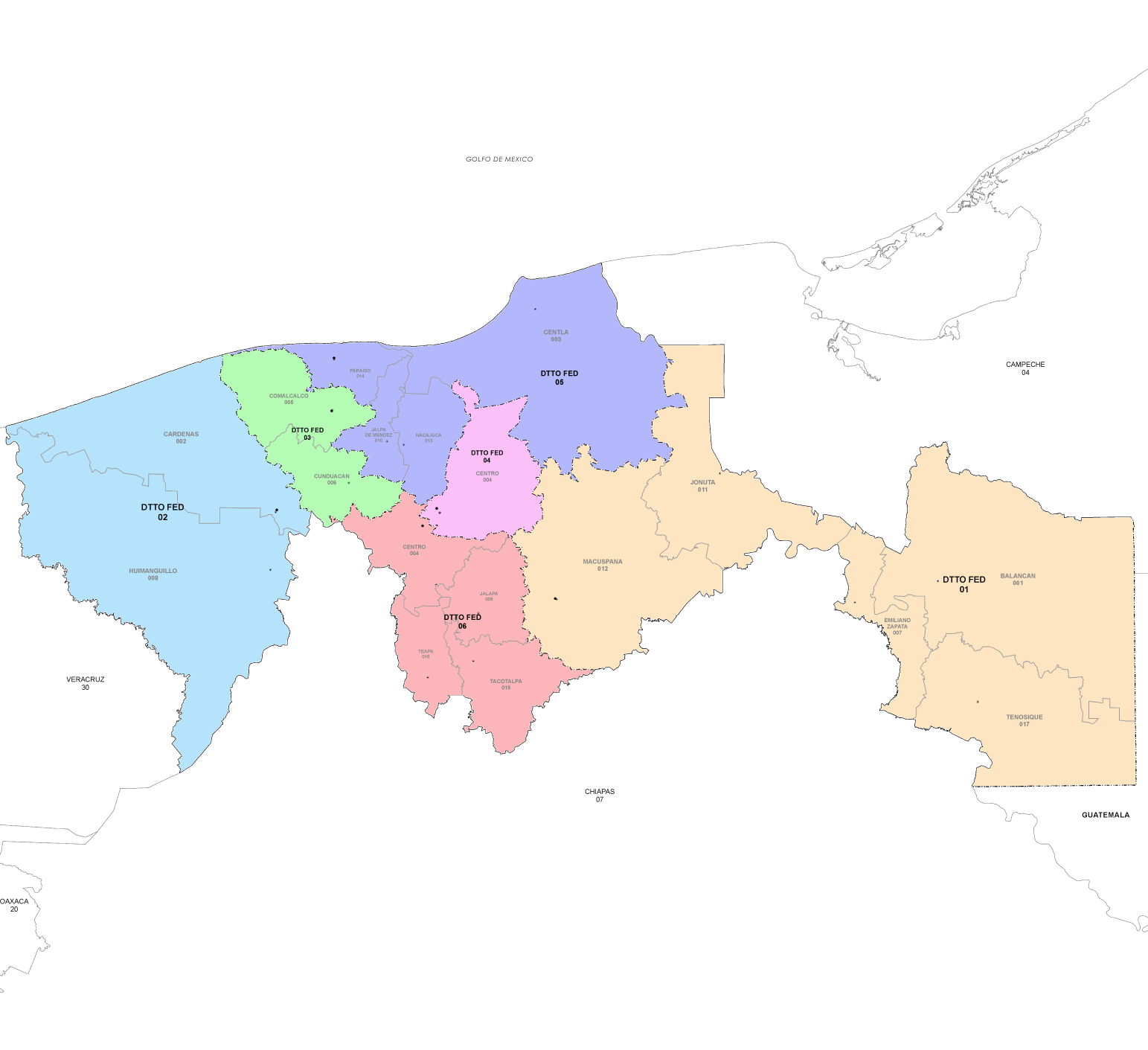
Federal electoral districts of Tabasco since 2023

District	Head town
1st federal electoral district of Tabasco	Macuspana
2nd federal electoral district of Tabasco	Heroica Cárdenas
3rd federal electoral district of Tabasco	Comalcalco
4th federal electoral district of Tabasco	Villahermosa
5th federal electoral district of Tabasco	Paraíso
6th federal electoral district of Tabasco	Villahermosa

=== Tamaulipas ===
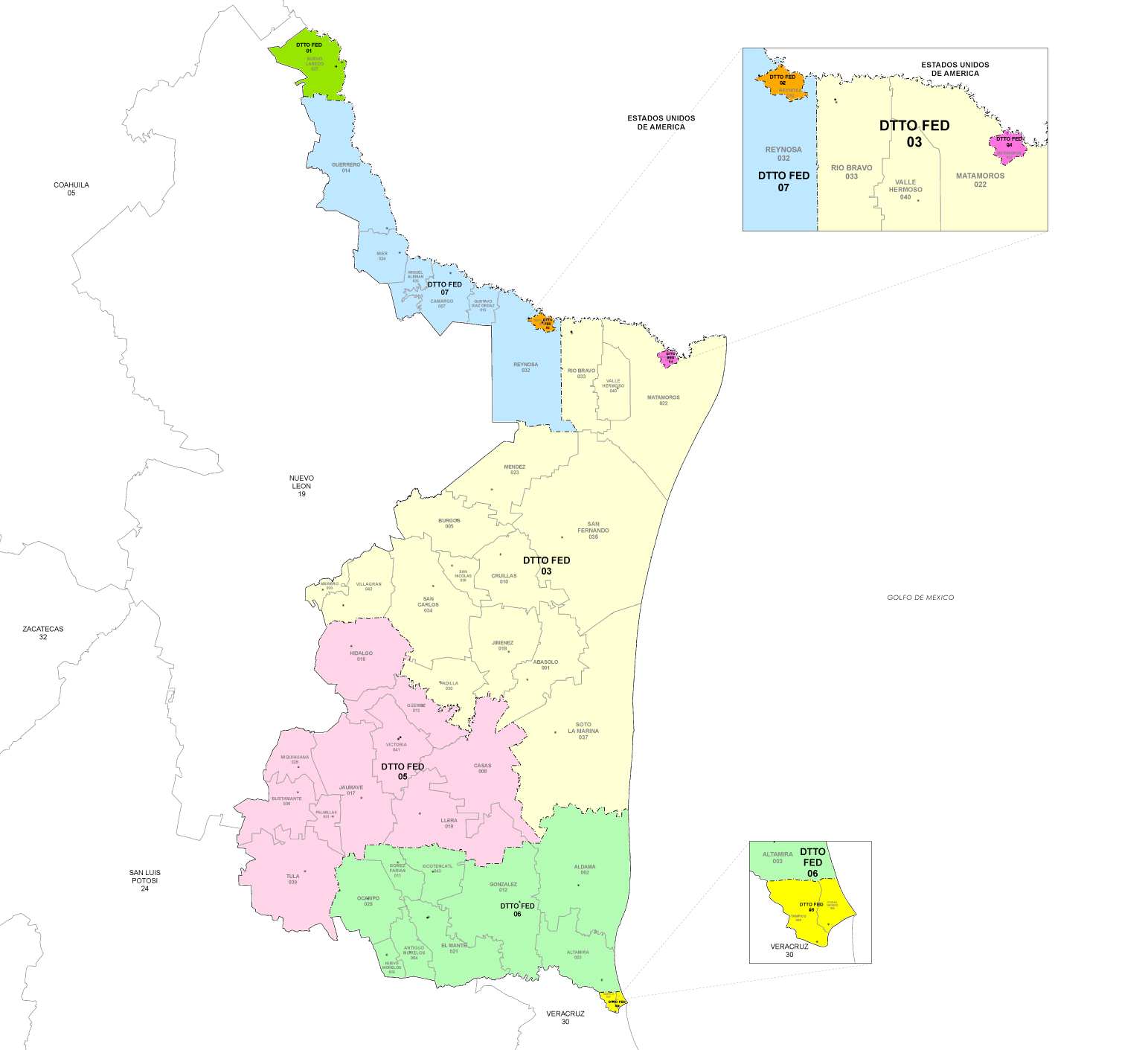
Federal electoral districts of Tamaulipas since 2023

District	Head town
1st federal electoral district of Tamaulipas	Nuevo Laredo
2nd federal electoral district of Tamaulipas	Reynosa
3rd federal electoral district of Tamaulipas	Río Bravo
4th federal electoral district of Tamaulipas	Heroica Matamoros
5th federal electoral district of Tamaulipas	Ciudad Victoria
6th federal electoral district of Tamaulipas	Ciudad Mante
7th federal electoral district of Tamaulipas	Ciudad Madero
8th federal electoral district of Tamaulipas	Tampico
9th federal electoral district of Tamaulipas	Defunct since 2023

=== Tlaxcala ===
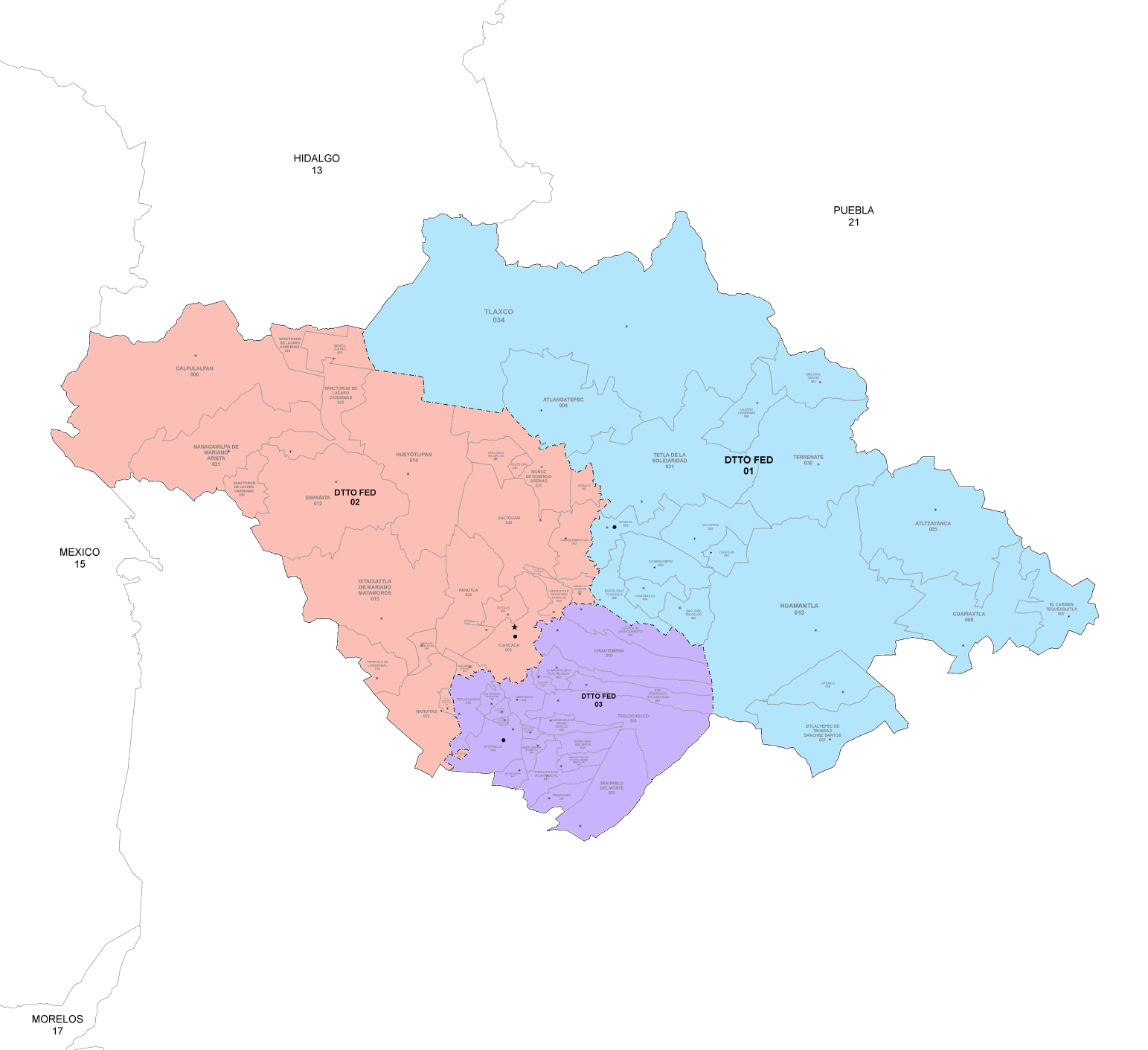
Federal electoral districts of Tlaxcala since 2023

District	Head town
1st federal electoral district of Tlaxcala	Apizaco
2nd federal electoral district of Tlaxcala	Tlaxcala de Xicohténcatl
3rd federal electoral district of Tlaxcala	Zacatelco

=== Veracruz ===
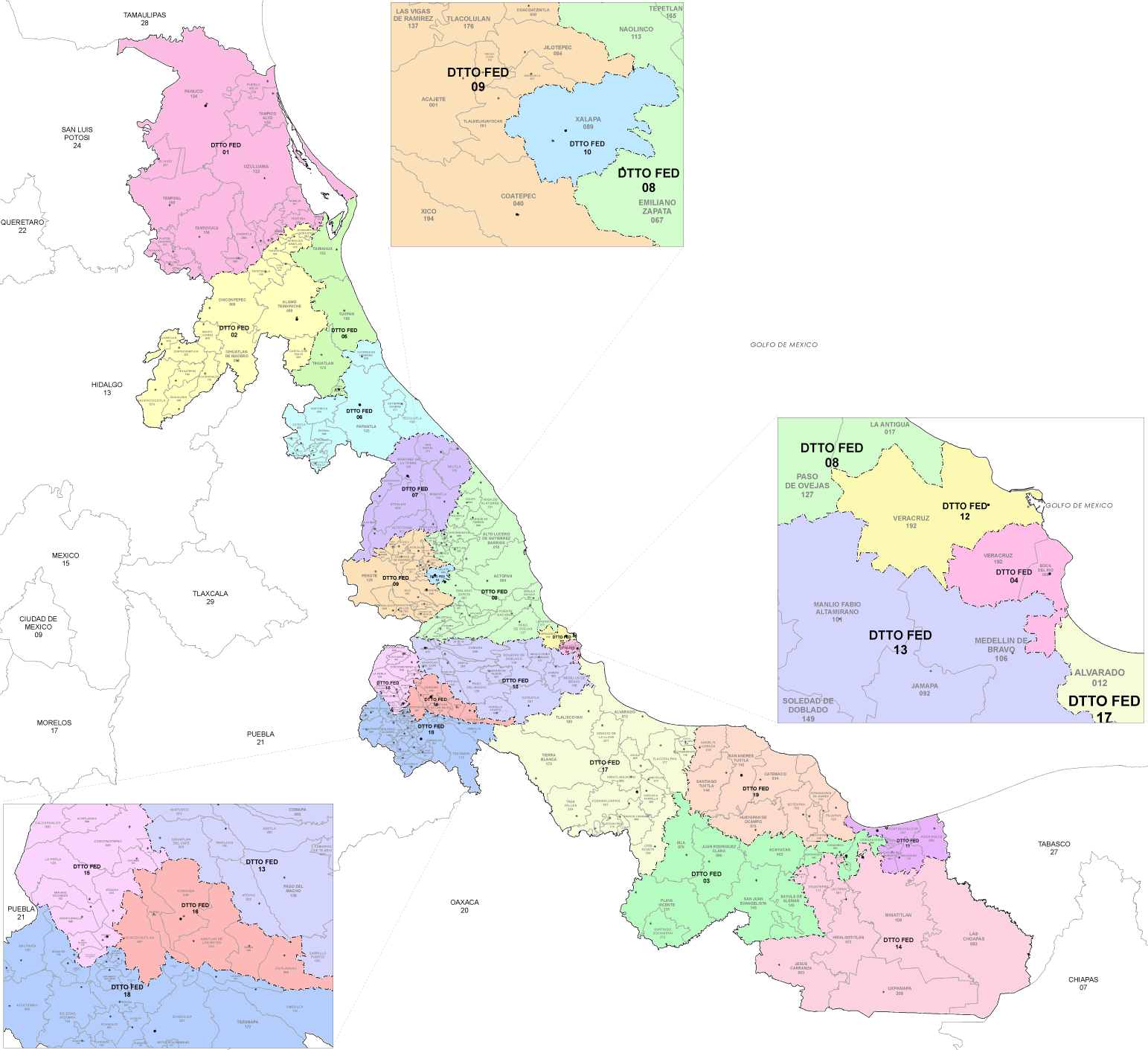
Federal electoral districts of Veracruz since 2023

District	Head town
1st federal electoral district of Veracruz	Pánuco
2nd federal electoral district of Veracruz	Álamo
3rd federal electoral district of Veracruz	Cosoleacaque
4th federal electoral district of Veracruz	Boca del Río
5th federal electoral district of Veracruz	Poza Rica de Hidalgo
6th federal electoral district of Veracruz	Papantla
7th federal electoral district of Veracruz	Martínez de la Torre
8th federal electoral district of Veracruz	Las Trancas
9th federal electoral district of Veracruz	Coatepec
10th federal electoral district of Veracruz	Xalapa
11th federal electoral district of Veracruz	Coatzacoalcos
12th federal electoral district of Veracruz	Veracruz
13th federal electoral district of Veracruz	Huatusco
14th federal electoral district of Veracruz	Minatitlán
15th federal electoral district of Veracruz	Orizaba
16th federal electoral district of Veracruz	Córdoba
17th federal electoral district of Veracruz	Cosamaloapan
18th federal electoral district of Veracruz	Zongolica
19th federal electoral district of Veracruz	San Andrés Tuxtla
20th federal electoral district of Veracruz	Defunct since 2023
21st federal electoral district of Veracruz	Defunct since 2017
22nd federal electoral district of Veracruz	Defunct since 2005
23rd federal electoral district of Veracruz	Defunct since 2005

=== Yucatán ===
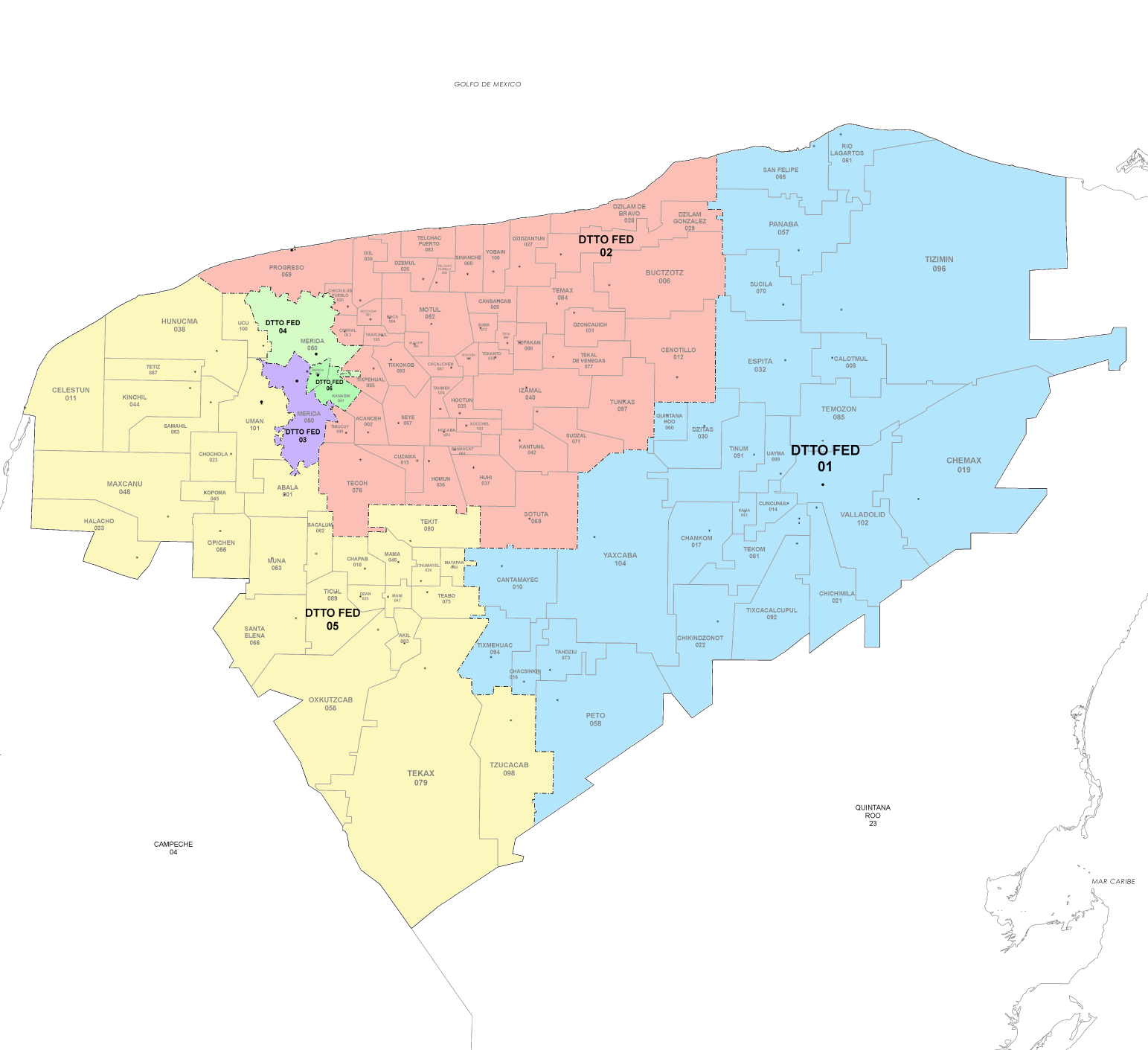
Federal electoral districts of Yucatán since 2023

District	Head town
1st federal electoral district of Yucatán	Valladolid
2nd federal electoral district of Yucatán	Progreso
3rd federal electoral district of Yucatán	Mérida
4th federal electoral district of Yucatán	Mérida
5th federal electoral district of Yucatán	Umán
6th federal electoral district of Yucatán	Mérida

=== Zacatecas ===
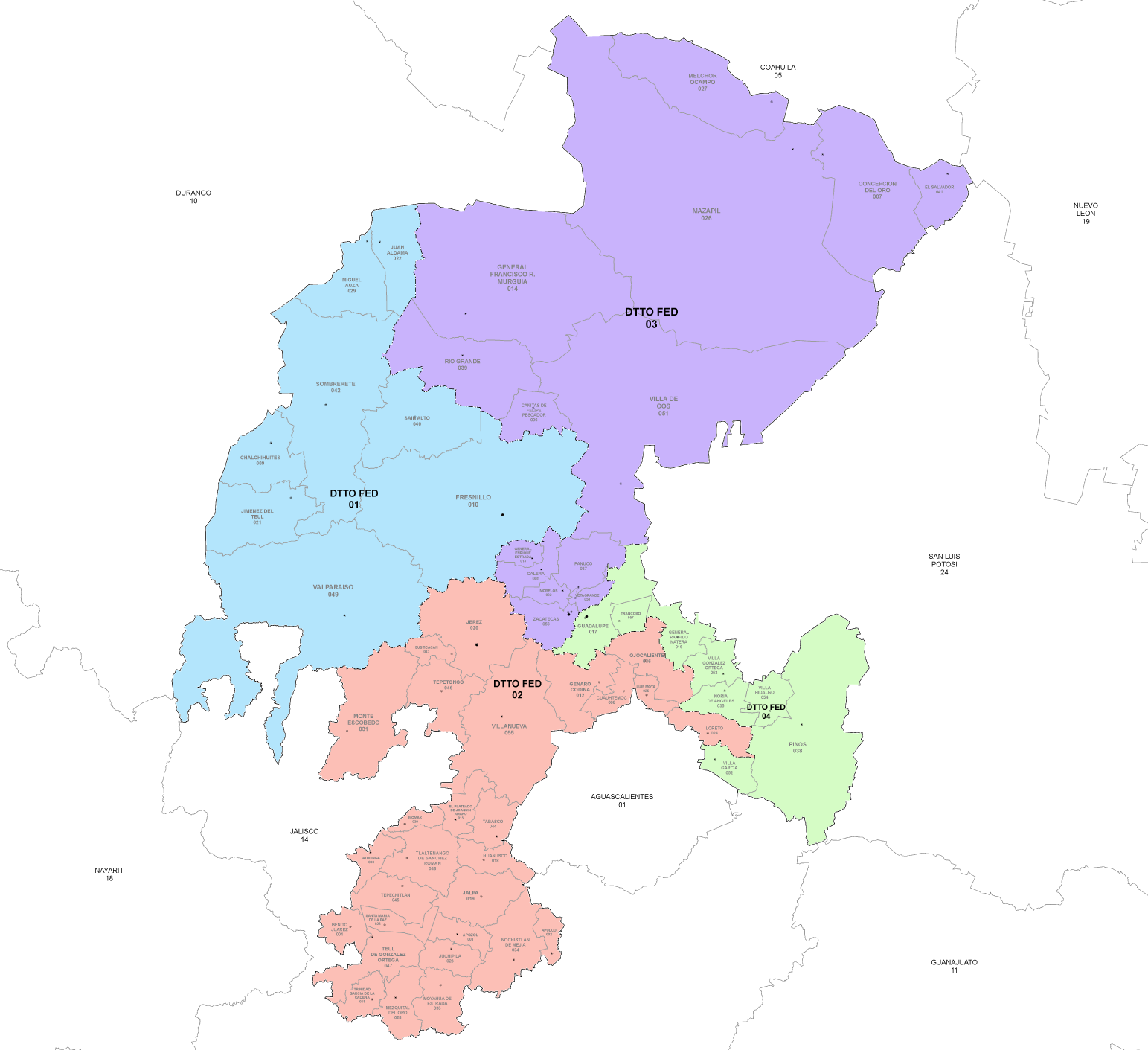
Federal electoral districts of Zacatecas since 2023

District	Head town
1st federal electoral district of Zacatecas	Fresnillo
2nd federal electoral district of Zacatecas	Jerez
3rd federal electoral district of Zacatecas	Zacatecas
4th federal electoral district of Zacatecas	Guadalupe
5th federal electoral district of Zacatecas	Defunct since 2005

== See also ==
- Chamber of Deputies of Mexico
- Elections in Mexico
- Electoral regions of Mexico
- National Electoral Institute
