= 2025 in Mexico =

- Decades: 2000s; 2010s; 2020s
- See also: History of Mexico; List of years in Mexico; Timeline of Mexican history

This article lists events occurring in Mexico during 2025. The list also contains names of the incumbents at federal and state levels and cultural and entertainment activities of the year.

== Events ==
=== January ===
- 1 January – The Tax Administration Service (SAT) implements new tariffs, including a 19% duty on goods from countries without international trade agreements with Mexico and a 17% duty on goods from Canada and the United States under certain value thresholds.
- 13 January –
  - Five people are killed in a shooting in Huitzilac, Morelos.
  - A magnitude 6.2 earthquake hits Michoacán, injuring two people.
- 23 January – The office of Sinaloa governor Rubén Rocha Moya in Culiacán is stormed by demonstrators protesting over the death of two minors in a carjacking.
- 26 January – Hernán Bermúdez Requena, the former Tabasco state secretary of public security and advisor to former governor Adán Augusto López fled Mexico to seek protection abroad while accusations of money laundering and drug trafficking have come to surface. Interpol issued a warrant for his arrest the following month.
- 31 January – Med Jets Flight 056: A Jet Rescue Air Ambulance Learjet 55 flying from Philadelphia in the United States to Tijuana crashes shortly after takeoff during a medevac flight, killing all six Mexican nationals on board.

=== February ===
- 1 February – US President Donald Trump imposes a 25% tariff on imports from Mexico.
- 3 February – The US suspends its increased tariffs on Mexican imports for a month following and agreement between President Trump and President Sheinbaum for her to deploy 10,000 National Guard soldiers to the US-Mexico border.
- 8 February – 2025 Escárcega bus crash. A bus collides with a truck before catching fire near Escárcega, Campeche, killing 41 people and injuring eight others.
- 13 February – Marco Ebben, a fugitive and convicted drug lord from the Netherlands who had previously faked his own death, is reported to have been killed in a shootout in Atizapán de Zaragoza, State of Mexico.
- 19 February – The United States designates the Sinaloa Cartel, the Jalisco New Generation Cartel, the Carteles Unidos, the Cártel del Noreste, the Gulf Cartel, and La Nueva Familia Michoacana Organization as terrorist organizations.
- 20 February – Canada designates the Sinaloa Cartel, the Jalisco New Generation Cartel, the Carteles Unidos, the Cártel del Noreste, the Gulf Cartel, and La Nueva Familia Michoacana Organization as terrorist organizations.
- 27 February –
  - The Supreme Court of Justice of the Nation orders the San Juan de Aragón zoo in Mexico City to improve the health of its resident African elephant, Ely, the first time it has made such a decision regarding an animal.
  - The Mexican government sends Rafael Caro Quintero and 28 other drug cartel figures to the United States to face criminal charges there.

=== March ===
- 4 March – President Trump reimposes expanded tariffs on Mexico.
- 5 March – Around 200 pairs of shoes, other personal items, three makeshift crematoriums, and charred human remains are found in a ranch in Teuchitlán, Jalisco.
- 10 March –
  - A bus overturns on the Mitla-Tehuantepec Highway in Oaxaca, killing 18 people and injuring 29 others.
  - A bus collides with a tractor near Velardeña, Durango, killing 14 people and injuring 10 others.
- 14 March – A magnitude 5.5 earthquake hits Oaxaca, injuring four people.
- 18 March – The Congress of Mexico City votes 61–1 in favor of outlawing killing of bulls in bullfighting matches and the use of sharp objects that could injure them.
- 21 March – Club León are disqualified from the upcoming 2025 FIFA Club World Cup after FIFA rules that the club had failed to meet tournament regulations on multi-club ownership regarding its connections to Grupo Pachuca, which also owns C.F. Pachuca.
- 23 March – A van falls into a ravine before catching fire in Santiago, Nuevo León, killing 12 people and injuring four others.
- 29 March – A nationwide ban on the sale of junk food in schools comes into effect.
- 31 March – The United States imposes sanctions on 13 individuals and entities for their involvement in money laundering for factions of the Sinaloa Cartel.

=== April ===
- 4 April – The first human case of avian flu belonging to the Type A H5N1 strain in Mexico is discovered in a three-year-old patient in Torreón, Coahuila, who originated from the state of Durango. She dies on 8 April, also making her the first human H5N1 fatality in Mexico.
- 5 April – Two photographers are killed in the collapse of a decorative structure at the Festival Ceremonia in Mexico City.
- 10 April – A Grob G 120TP trainer aircraft of the Mexican Air Force crashes near Ameca, Jalisco, killing its two crew members.
- 19 April – WWE announces on its WrestleMania 41 pre-show panel that they had acquired the promotion Lucha Libre AAA Worldwide (AAA).
- 28 April – Mexico reaches an agreement with the United States providing for a greater share by the US of water flow in six tributaries of the Rio Grande.
- 27 April to 3 May – 2025 IIHF World Championship Division III Group B

=== May ===
- 3 May – José Murguía Santiago, the mayor of Teuchitlán, Jalisco, is arrested on suspicion of involvement in the operations of the Jalisco extermination camp.
- 13 May – TikTok influencer Valeria Márquez is shot dead during a livestream in Zapopan, Jalisco.
- 14 May – A truck, a bus and a van collide in Puebla, killing 21 people.
- 15 May – The mayor of Santiago Amoltepec in Oaxaca, Mario Hernández, is killed along with two others in an ambush.
- 16 May – Two security instructors for the Jalisco police are killed in a shooting in Guadalajara.
- 17 May – Cuauhtémoc Brooklyn Bridge collision: The Mexican Navy training ship ARM Cuauhtémoc crashes into the Brooklyn Bridge in New York City, killing two sailors and damaging the vessel.
- 19 May – Seven people are killed in a shooting by suspected members of the Santa Rosa de Lima Cartel at a religious event in San Bartolo de Berrios, Guanajuato.
- 20 May – The personal secretary of Mexico City mayor Clara Brugada and another adviser are shot dead in the Moderna neighborhood.
- 20 May – The United States imposes sanctions on two members of the Cártel del Noreste.
- 22 May – A court in the United States awards the Mexican government $2.448 billion in damages from former secretary of public security Genaro García Luna, who was convicted and imprisoned in the US for drug charges, and his wife Linda Cristina Pereyra.
- 23 May – Photographer Graciela Iturbide is awarded the Princess of Asturias Prize for the Arts, citing her work in documenting "the social reality not only of Mexico, but also of many places".
- 26 May – Authorities announce the discovery of 17 bodies inside an abandoned house in Irapuato, Guanajuato.
- 27 May – Six soldiers are killed in a bomb attack in Michoacán.
- 29 May – The bodies of five members of the musical band Grupo Fugitivo who went missing on 25 May are discovered in Reynosa.

=== June ===
- 1 June –
  - 2025 Mexican judicial elections: Hugo Aguilar Ortiz, a Mixtec from Oaxaca, is elected president of the Supreme Court of Justice of the Nation and becomes the first indigenous person since Benito Juárez in 1858 to become a justice in the court amid a turnout of 13%.
  - Twelve people are killed in a fire at a drug rehabilitation center in San José Iturbide, Guanajuato.
- 3 June – A bus overturns in Hualahuises, Nuevo León, killing 11 people and injuring 17 others.
- 5 June – The Supreme Court of the United States dismisses a lawsuit filed by the Mexican government that sought to hold American gun manufacturers liable for the illegal sale of firearms to drug cartels and other criminal organizations in Mexico.
- 6 June –
  - An aircraft conducting pest control operations crashes near Tapachula, Chiapas, killing all three people on board.
  - The mayor of Tacámbaro in Michoacán, Salvador Bastida García, is killed along with his security detail in an ambush.
- 8 June – Chiapas police enter the Guatemalan border town of La Mesilla during an operation that leaves four gunmen dead.
- 9 June – The United States imposes sanctions on Archivaldo Iván Guzmán Salazar and Jesús Alfredo Guzmán Salazar, sons of Sinaloa Cartel leader Joaquín "El Chapo" Guzmán.
- 16 June – The mayor of San Mateo Piñas in Oaxaca, Lilia Gema García Soto, is killed along with another official in an attack by gunmen on the municipal hall.
- 17 June – The mayor of Tepalcatepec in Michoacán, Martha Laura Mendoza, is killed along with her husband while leaving her home.
- 18 June – Debris from a failed rocket launch by SpaceX in Texas lands over the border in Tamaulipas, prompting an investigation into contamination by the Mexican government.
- 19 June – Hurricane Erick makes landfall in Oaxaca as a category 3 storm, leaving at least one person dead.
- 25 June –
  - 2025 Irapuato shooting: Twelve people are killed in a gun attack on a religious celebration in Irapuato, Guanajuato.
  - The United States imposes sanctions on the Mexican banks CIBanco and Intercam Banco and the brokerage firm Vector Casa de Bolsa for allegedly facilitating cash transfers for drug cartels.
- 26 June – The accumulated remains of 389 people are discovered in suspicious circumstances at a crematorium in Ciudad Juárez.
- 30 June – The bodies of 20 people are discovered along two separate sections of a highway near Culiacán.

=== July ===
- 4–5 July – Protests break out in Mexico City denouncing gentrification and rent increases, with violent clashes between protesters and tourists occurring in the Condesa and Roma districts.
- 6 July – Mexico wins its tenth CONCACAF Gold Cup title after defeating the United States 2-1 at the 2025 CONCACAF Gold Cup final in Houston.
- 7 July – Four million gallons of stolen fuel products are recovered from two abandoned trains near Ramos Arizpe and Saltillo in Coahuila.
- 9 July –
  - Ten people are sentenced to 141 years' imprisonment on abduction and murder charges relating to the Jalisco extermination camp.
  - El Salvador recalls its ambassador to Mexico, Rosa Delmy Cañas, after Mexican security minister Omar García Harfuch claims that authorities had intercepted an aircraft off the coast of Colima that was transporting 428 kilograms of cocaine and originated from El Salvador.
- 24 July – Mexico and the United States sign an agreement for a comprehensive resolution of environmental and sewerage problems in the Tijuana River.
- 30 July – The bodies of 32 people are discovered buried in a property in Irapuato, Guanajuato.

=== August ===
- 1 August – Israel Vallarta, the alleged leader of a kidnapping group who was arrested and imprisoned for more than 20 years in a case of organized crime and kidnapping that also involved his French girlfriend Florence Cassez, is released after charges against him are dismissed.
- 2 August –
  - Seven inmates are killed and eleven others are injured in a riot at a prison in Tuxpan, Veracruz.
  - A magnitude 5.8 earthquake hits Oaxaca, injuring two people.
- 4 August – Ernesto Vásquez Reyna, the representative of the Attorney General of Mexico in Tamaulipas, is shot dead in Reynosa.
- 5 August – Activist Luis García Villagrán is arrested in Tapachula on charges related to his advocacy for migrants.
- 6 August – The United States imposes sanctions on rapper Ricardo Hernández aka El Makabelico for alleged money laundering for the Cártel del Noreste.
- 12 August – Mexico extradites 26 senior drug cartel figures to the United States including Jalisco New Generation Cartel leader Abigael González Valencia.
- 14 August – The United States returns a 16th century-manuscript page signed by Hernán Cortés that was stolen from the Archivo General de la Nación between 1985 and 1993.
- 15 August – Mexico, Guatemala and Belize announce an agreement to create a tri-national nature reserve to protect the Maya Forest.
- 19 August –
  - Six severed heads are found on a highway in Tlaxcala. The incident is blamed on a criminal gang.
  - The Tren Maya derails at Izamal railway station in Yucatán on its way from Cancun to Merida. No injuries are reported.
- 27 August – A brawl breaks out in the Senate between PRI leader Alito Moreno and Senate president Gerardo Fernandez Norona (MORENA).

=== September ===
- 2 September –
  - Manuel Roberto Farías Laguna, a vice admiral in the Mexican Navy, is detained as part of an investigation into the seizure of 10 million liters of fuel from a vessel in Tampico in March.
  - A magnitude 4.8 earthquake hits Baja California Sur, damaging several buildings in San José del Cabo.
- 8 September – A freight-train collides with a double-decker bus at a level crossing in Atlacomulco, Mexico State, killing 10 people and injuring 61 others.
- 10 September –
  - 2025 Iztapalapa tank truck explosion: A liquid petroleum gas truck overturns and explodes at an overpass in Iztapalapa, Mexico City, killing over 30 people and injuring 90 others.
  - Naasón Joaquín García, leader of the Guadalajara-based megachurch La Luz del Mundo, is indicted in the United States on federal sex trafficking and racketeering charges.
- 13 September – An accident involving three vehicles in Mérida, Yucatán, kills 15 people and injures two others.
- 14 September – Former Tabasco state secretary of public security Hernán Bermúdez Requena is arrested in Paraguay on charges of leading the La Barredora cartel.
- 17 September – The bodies of two Colombian singers who went missing in Mexico City are discovered in Cocotitlan, Mexico State.
- 18 September – The United States imposes sanctions on the Los Mayos faction of the Sinaloa Cartel.
- 23 September – The United States returns a Spanish-era map that was recorded stolen from the Archivo General de la Nación in 2011 and recovered in New Mexico.
- 24 September – Thirty-eight members of La Luz del Mundo, including an American citizen, are arrested on unspecified charges in Michoacán.
- 26 September –
  - Former National Institute of Migration head Francisco Garduño Yáñez issues a public apology over the Ciudad Juárez migrant center fire in 2023 following a court order.
  - A transmission line failure causes a massive blackout affecting Yucatán, Campeche and Quintana Roo.

=== October ===
- 1 October – Five people are found dead in a suspected vigilante killing in Santa María Texcatitlán, Oaxaca.
- 4 October –
  - Former footballer Omar Bravo is arrested by Zapopan police on allegations of sexual abuse of a minor.
  - The suspected leader of the Mexican branch of the Tren de Aragua gang is arrested in Mexico City.
- 6 October – The United States imposes sanctions on 20 Mexican individuals and entities involved in the production of fentanyl by the Chapitos faction of the Sinaloa Cartel.
- 7 October –
  - Authorities find the body of a missing priest from the Diocese of Chilpancingo-Chilapa in Guerrero.
  - Six people are killed after soldiers open fire on a vehicle along a highway in Tamaulipas.
- 13 October – At least 70 people are killed while 65 others are reported missing following days of flooding and landslides caused by heavy rains in central and southeastern Mexico.
- 20 October – Bernardo Bravo, president of the Apatzingán Valley Citrus Producers Association, is found killed in a vehicle in Michoacán after denouncing violence by drug cartels.

=== November ===
- 1 November –
  - A fire and explosion at a Waldo's in Hermosillo, Sonora, kills 23 people.
  - Carlos Manzo, the mayor of Uruapan, Michoacán, is shot and killed while attending Day of the Dead festivities.
- 3 November –
  - Peru severs diplomatic relations with Mexico in response to former prime minister Betssy Chávez being granted asylum at the Mexican embassy in Lima amid an investigation against her on charges relating to the 2022 Peruvian self-coup attempt.
  - Gonzalo Celorio, director of the Mexican Academy of Language, is awarded the 2025 Miguel de Cervantes Prize.
- 4 November – President Claudia Sheinbaum is groped on a downtown Mexico City street; the perpetrator is arrested.
- 5 November – Adidas releases the new home kit of the Mexico national football team for the 2026 FIFA World Cup.
- 6 November – The Peruvian Congress declares president Sheinbaum persona non grata over the Mexican government's decision to grant asylum to former prime minister Betssy Chávez.
- 8 November – A suspect in the assassination of PRI presidential candidate Luis Donaldo Colosio Murrieta in 1994 is arrested in Tijuana.
- 10 November – Authorities announce the discovery of 16 bodies from a clandestine gravesite in Leona Vicario, Quintana Roo.
- 12 November – The government suspends the operations of 13 casinos on suspicion of involvement in money laundering.
- 13 November –
  - The United States imposes sanctions on 26 individuals and entities including the Hysa Family on charges of money laundering for the Sinaloa Cartel.
  - A priest who disappeared on 27 October is found dead near Tultepec, State of Mexico.
- 15 November –
  - 2025 Mexican protests: Gen Z-styled protests across the country took place in the aftermath of the assassination of Uruapan mayor Carlos Manzo on 1 November. These left 120 people injured, including 100 police officers, and 20 others arrested.
  - The Mexico national football team draws 0–0 with Uruguay in a friendly match held in Torreón, resulting in local fans booing and hurling violent insults at players and other team personnel.
- 21 November – Fátima Bosch of Tabasco is crowned Miss Universe 2025 in Thailand.
- 27 November — Alejandro Gertz Manero resigns as attorney general after being nominated by President Sheinbaum to become an ambassador to an undisclosed country.

=== December ===
- 1 December – Alejandro Rosales Castillo remained a fugitive on the FBI's Ten Most Wanted list for over 8 years in 2017 until he was captured in January 2026.
- 3 December – The Senate elects Ernestina Godoy Ramos to serve as federal attorney general.
- 5 December – Mexico is placed in Group A for the 2026 FIFA World Cup, along with South Africa, South Korea and an unnamed UEFA squad. Mexico is set to play the opening match of the tournament at Estadio Azteca on 11 June 2026.
- 6 December –
  - Five people are killed in a car bombing outside a police station in Coahuayana, Michoacán.
  - A member of the National Guard is arrested after shooting dead three of his colleagues at a barracks in Michoacán.
- 8 December – Former Chihuahua governor César Duarte Jáquez is arrested over allegations of money laundering.
- 15 December – 2025 Toluca Cessna Citation III crash: A light private aircraft travelling from Acapulco to Toluca crashes in San Mateo Atenco, Mexico State, killing 10 people.
- 18 December – A merger agreement is announced between budget airlines Viva and Volaris.
- 22 December – A light Mexican Navy aircraft carrying eight people on a medical evacuation flight from Mérida, Yucatán, crashes in Galveston Bay in Texas, killing five people.
- 28 December – 2025 Oaxaca train derailment: The Interoceanic Train derails near Nizandá, Oaxaca, killing 14 people and injuring more than 100.

== Holidays ==
- 1 January – New Year's Day
- 3 February – Constitution Day
- 17 March – Benito Juárez Day
- 17 April – Maundy Thursday
- 18 April – Good Friday
- 1 May – Labour Day
- 5 May – Cinco de Mayo
- 16 September – Independence Day
- 12 October – Día de la Raza
- 2 November – Day of the Dead
- 17 November – Revolution Day
- 12 December – Feast of Our Lady of Guadalupe
- 25 December – Christmas Day

== Art and entertainment ==
- List of Mexican submissions for the Academy Award for Best International Feature Film

== Deaths ==
=== January ===
- 2 January – Cristóbal Ortega, 68, footballer (América, national team).
- 4 January – Emilio Echevarría, 80, actor (Amores perros, Die Another Day, The Alamo).
- 6 January – Jorge Flores, 70, Olympic basketball player (1976).
- 10 January – Horacio González de las Casas, 82, politician, deputy (1988–1991).
- 11 January – James Carlos Blake, 81, Mexican-born American author.
- 27 January –
  - Joel Ayala Almeida, 78, trade unionist and politician, senator (2000–2006, 2012–2018) and three-time deputy.
  - Alma Rosa Aguirre, 95, actress.
- 28 January – David Noel Ramírez Padilla, 75, academic administrator, rector of the Monterrey Institute of Technology and Higher Education (2011–2017).
- 29 January – Martha Hilda González Calderón, 59, politician, deputy (2015–2018).

=== February ===
- 4 February – Felipe Montemayor, 96, baseball player (Pittsburgh Pirates).
- 11 February – Norma Mora, 81, actress (Qué perra vida, Los astronautas).
- 17 February –
  - Paquita la del Barrio, 77, singer, songwriter and actress.
  - Yolanda Montes, 93, American-Mexican actress (Salomé, Kill Me Because I'm Dying!, Nocturne of Love) and dancer.
- 20 February – Daniel Bisogno, 51, television actor and host.
- 25 February – Roberto Orci, 51, Mexican-born American screenwriter (Star Trek, Transformers) and television producer (Fringe).

=== March ===
- 1 March – Flor Procuna, 72, actress (Los ricos también lloran).
- 4 March – Ciclón Ramirez, 64, professional wrestler (CMLL, IWRG).
- 8 March – Isabel Miranda de Wallace, 73, social activist.
- 9 March –
  - Bracito de Oro, 59, wrestler.
  - Yola Ramírez, 90, tennis player.
- 10 March – Jesús Antonio Lerma Nolasco, 79, Roman Catholic prelate, auxiliary bishop of Mexico (2009–2019) and bishop of Iztapalapa (2019–2021).
- 13 March – Mario Ramírez Treviño, 63, suspected drug trafficker.
- 15 March – Hernán Lara Zavala, 79, novelist and literary critic.
- 28 March – Olegario Vázquez Raña, 89, sports shooter and businessman, four-time Olympic competitor (1964–1976).
- 30 March – Enrique Bátiz, 82, pianist and conductor.

=== April ===
- 1 April –
  - Arsenio Campos, 79, actor.
  - María del Carmen Pinete Vargas, 64, politician, four-term deputy, vice president of the Chamber (2024).
- 9 April – Juan Manuel Gastélum, 70, politician, deputy (2012–2015) and municipal president of Tijuana (2016–2019).
- 13 April – Miguel Cortés Miranda, 40, chemist and charged serial killer.
- 18 April – Rodolfo Torres Medina, 76, politician, mayor of Chihuahua (1989–1992) and rector of the Autonomous University of Chihuahua (1985–1989), cancer.
- 20 April – Black Terry, 72, professional wrestler (CMLL, IWRG, UWA).
- 25 April –
  - Eugenio Anguiano Roch, 85, economist, academic and diplomat.
  - Lupita Torrentera, 93, actress and ballerina (Coqueta).
- 28 April – Juana Gutierrez, 93, Mexican-American political activist.

=== May ===
- 2 May – Fidel Herrera Beltrán, 76, politician, governor of Veracruz (2004–2010), senator (2000–2004), and four-time deputy.
- 16 May – Mariano Azuela Güitrón, 89, jurist, justice (1983–2009) and president (2003–2009) of the Supreme Court of Justice of the Nation.

=== August ===
- 20 August – Mariana Gándara Salazar, 41, playwright and theater director.
- 28 August –
  - Lourdes Ambriz, 67, soprano.
  - Estela Molina, 77, wrestler.
- 29 August – Alberto Padilla, 60, journalist and television presenter.
- 30 August – Arnoldo Kraus, 73, physician and academic.

=== September ===
- 20 September – Débora Estrella, 43, news reporter.
- 29 September – Javier Sánchez Galindo, 77, footballer (Cruz Azul, Chivas Guadalajara, América and Mexico national team).

=== October ===
- 25 October – Manuel Lapuente, 81, footballer and manager. Led Mexican national team at the 1998 FIFA World Cup and champion at the 1999 FIFA Confederations Cup.
- 31 October – Francisco Rojas Gutiérrez, 81, politician, director of both PEMEX and the CFE.

=== November ===
- 1 November – Carlos Manzo, 40, politician, municipal president of Uruapan, Michoacán (since 2024).
- 21 November – Margit Frenk, 100, German-born philologist, folklorist and translator.

=== December ===
- 15 December – Juan José Zerboni, 72, actor (Dra. Lucía, un don extraordinario).
- 23 December – Zeferino Peña Cuéllar, drug lord (Gulf Cartel).
- 30 December – Francisco Barrio, 75, governor of Chihuahua (1992–1998).
- 31 December – Patricio Chirinos del Ángel, 57, politician.

== See also ==
- Outline of Mexico
- History of Mexico
