= Héctor Hernández =

Héctor Hernández may refer to:

- Héctor Hernández (footballer, born 1935) (1935–1984), Mexican football forward
- Héctor Javier Hernández (born 1958), Mexican politician
- Héctor Hernández Silva (born 1964), Mexican politician
- Héctor Hugo Hernández Rodríguez (born 1974), Mexican politician
- Héctor Hernández (basketball) (born 1985), Mexican basketball player
- Héctor Hernández (footballer, born 1991) (Héctor Hernández Ortega), Spanish football left-back
- Héctor Hernández (footballer, born 1995) (Héctor Hernández Marrero), Spanish football forward
