= Juan Núñez =

Juan Núñez may refer to:

- Juan Núñez de Prado (grand master of Calatrava) (died 1355), Portuguese noble
- Juan Núñez de Prado (conquistador) (c. 1515 - c. 1557), conquered Tucumán Province in what is now Argentina
- Juan Núñez de la Peña (1641–1721), priest and historian of colonization
- Juan Núñez (tennis) (born 1956), tennis player from Chile
- Juan Núñez (athlete) (born 1959), Dominican Republic Olympic runner
- Juan Núñez (basketball) (born 2004), Spanish basketball player
- Juan Carlos Núñez Armas (born 1964), Mexican politician
- Juan Carlos Núñez (born 1983), Mexican footballer
- Juan Aguilera Núñez (born 1985), Spanish professional footballer for SD Huesca
- Juan Gilberto Núñez (born 1986), Colombian footballer
- Juan Núñez (baseball) (born 2000), Dominican Republic baseball player

== Other uses ==
- Casas de Juan Núñez, Spanish municipality

== See also ==
- Juan Núñez de Lara (disambiguation)
