= Irapuato massacre =

The Irapuato massacre may refer to the following killings in the city of Irapuato, Guanajuato, Mexico:

- 2020 Irapuato massacres, two attacks at drug rehabilitation centres on different days
- 2025 Irapuato shooting, at a festival celebrating the Nativity of John the Baptist
