= Mothers of East Los Angeles =

American advocacy organization

Mothers of East Los Angeles (MELA), started in 1986, as a group of Latina mothers to fight the proposed construction of a state prison in East Los Angeles by Governor George Deukmejian. Rosa Diseno, Lucy Ramos, Mary Lou Trevis, Juana Gutierrez, and Aurora Castillo are some of the founding mothers among the 400-member group. Two organizations exist today which originate from the same founding members, one organization being the Mothers of East LA and the other being Madres de Este Los Angeles, Santa Isabel. Both groups are primarily focused on environmental justice because they are mothers who have coalesced around something of immediate importance to them, the safety of their families and children". They are known nationally for their victory over the proposed state prison in East L.A. which later led MELA to take on many issues that have affected their environment and quality of life and has been unceasing in their dedication to protect their community from other projects they perceive as harmful.

== Political history ==
East Los Angeles State Prison

The California Department of Corrections (CDC) was ordered by the California state legislators to build a prison in the Los Angeles County because of the disproportionate number of inmates that originated from the SoCal area. Plans regarding the site location had been under debate for three years prior to the announcement of a new prison in the region of East Los Angeles in March 1985. Many people were not aware until Assemblywoman Gloria Molina directed attention to the issue. Molina began to rally the support of organizations and coalitions which helped gain time for their movement to grow but was coming to a decisive point by September 1986. Not long before that a parish priest Monsignor John Moretta had become part of the prison opposition and gained certain prominence in the movement. He was responsible for naming the mothers as "Mothers of East L.A." MELA's involvement in the opposition for the prison created a greater sense of community, exposed the potential dangers that the prison could present to the existing mixed residential-industrial community, and gained major publicity protesting against the prison construction. When the prison came up for a vote in the summer of 1991, it failed by four votes.

During the campaign against the proposed prison, the Mothers of East Los Angeles developed several methods of organizing and communicating with local residents. Members used telephone calls to spread information throughout the neighborhood and informed residents about the campaign after Sunday Mass. Aurora Castillo maintained a list of approximately 400 telephone numbers that could be used to quickly share information with members. The organization also used demonstrations and letter-writing campaigns to communicate its opposition to government officials and the public. Members traveled to Sacramento to demonstrate and lobby state legislators, while local organizing efforts continued and helped maintain participation within the community. As the campaign continued, members became more experienced in organizing protests and marches and in attracting news coverage to their activities. The group's public demonstrations also developed recognizable visual elements. During the prison campaign, members wore white scarves at marches and demonstrations as a symbol of their commitment to nonviolent protest. The scarves later became a recognizable feature of the organization at demonstrations and legislative meetings. As the organization developed, members later replaced the scarves with T-shirts and buttons displaying a red logo of a woman holding an infant. The visual symbols gave the organization a recognizable presence for when its members participated in demonstrations and other political activities.

== Environmental Justice ==
=== Incinerator in Vernon ===
In 1987 California Thermal Treatment Systems announced that an incinerator was going "to be constructed in the heart of the South Coast Air Basin, in the city of Vernon, within 7,500 feet (2,300 m) of homes, schools, churches, hospitals, and food processing facilities". The planning for this incinerator had been under the rug for two years before the news was announced. Assemblywoman Lucille Roybal-Allard quickly gathered support from the East LA community such as MELA and Greenpeace. They were able to organize protest marches, keep the community aware using their bilingual ties, and attend important hearings to make their voices publicly heard. MELA actively participated in the fight against the incinerator for several reasons: harmful health effects from probable increased air, pollution, environmental discrimination from large companies and failure for the Environmental Protection Agency and CTTS to undergo proper legal procedures. After a six-year battle, MELA sued the Environmental Protection Agency for failure to provide Environmental Impact Report prior to agreeing to the continuance of the project. In 1991 the incinerator project was abandoned due to high opposition from health risks and a change of a new conditional agreement which included "preparing an EIR, and to incorporate 'best available control technology’ (BACT), and update its health risk assessment".

=== Treatment plant ===
A few weeks after the victory over the incinerator project, ChemClear, a treatment plant for hazardous waste, was proposed in the Huntington Park, California. MELA, Senator Al Torres, California Association of School Health Educators and other important groups played a critical role in petitioning and protesting against the plant. They rose issues against the facility location, an emergency contingency plan, waste minimization, fugitive emissions, methods of public outreach, and alternate transportation routes. In 1991, Chem Clear abandoned the project due to a recession. Nonetheless, MELA considered it a victory against yet another harmful project.

=== School air quality ===
In 2011, MELA began working on improving the air quality of 7 schools in Boyle Heights. This project is being funded through the $1 million grant from Reformulated Gasoline Fund. MELA's goal is to create a better environment for children because Los Angeles has a reputation for having bad air pollution.

== Motherly activism ==
MELA transformed traditional networks, resources based on family, and Mexican American culture to defend their communities from injustices. They made important connections to the mother's role as selfless caregivers by using political activism as a tool to extend that care towards the community. They have also strived to be inclusive to non-mothers. Members from MELA often relate the conditions of their low income communities and their histories to be a strong factor in believing that they have the right to oppose state-proposed projects if they believe it is detrimental to the health of the community.

Scholars have also examined motherhood as a rhetorical strategy within MELA’s activism. Communication scholar Christopher Scott Thomas argues that the organization expanded maternal responsibility beyond caring for individual families to protecting children throughout the neighborhood. Thomas describes the approach as “motherwork,” in which motherhood in turn became a communal responsibility to protect the well-being of the community’s children. He argues that MELA’s maternal appeals allowed motherhood to function as an organizing principle that could mobilize a larger collective. Thomas also connects this strategy to rhetorical agency, as he describes motherhood as a means through which women can engage in collective resistance and empowerment.

The group's emphasis on protecting children also remained visible as its activism expanded beyond the prison campaign. In 1991, Juana Beatriz Gutierrez described concerns about pollution by emphasizing the proximity of a proposed waste incinerator to schools, churches, senior homes, and other parts of the community. The organization used strategies developed during the prison campaign, including telephone organizing, marches, and efforts to attract media coverage, in its environmental activism. Members also raised money for protest trips and distributed educational materials, buttons, and T-shirts at the event. Gutierrez described the group's concerns as extending beyond its own neighborhood, connecting its local activism to environmental issues elsewhere.

== Allies ==
Mothers of East LA has worked alongside many other organizations that have fought for the quality of life in the community.

Organization	About
Watchdog	focusing in environmental issues through "education, scientific analysis, and public protest”
Concerned Citizens of South Central Los Angeles	non-profit organization that works to create and help low income housing projects around their community
AD Hoc Committee	works to try to end poverty in Los Angeles and all around California
Boyle Heights Chamber of Commerce	a business oriented private nonprofit organization that tries to make resources more accessible to the public and tries to be involved with city beautification projects
Hollenbeck Youth Center	an organization that focuses on providing enrichment programs through athletics, education, culture, and community activities for kids
TELACU	tries to improve and enforce ideas on how to protect and make the community grow to become a safe and clean environment

These organizations assist MELA in creating public improvement projects geared towards greater community.

== Work during the 21st century ==
MELA's focuses on conservation programs like health education campaigns, raising money for scholarships, informing the community about environmental injustice through mass demonstrations, community and legal hearings.

In 2010 MELA has been involved fighting against the proposed CVS Pharmacy in place of the historic Golden Gate Theater which was built in 1927. MELA argued that the construction of a CVS could have hazardous environmental effects and increase the alcohol selling/buying ratio. The East Los Angeles Association (ELARA) stated that "it would mean critical revenue for any future city of East Los Angeles." The Board of supervisors allowed the conversion of the theater to CVS store.
