= 2025 Atlacomulco bus crash =

Bus crash in Atlacomulco, Mexico

- Location in the State of Mexico

Details
- Date: 8 September 2025 c. 6:30 a.m CST (UTC-6:00)
- Location: Atlacomulco, Mexico

Statistics
- Vehicles: 2
- Deaths: 10
- Injured: 61

On 8 September 2025, a bus in Atlacomulco, Mexico was hit by a freight train, killing 10 and injuring 61. The bus was hit in an industrial area 80 miles (130 km) northwest of Mexico City. The train was operated by Canadian Pacific Kansas City de México (CPKC de México) and was reportedly transporting cars to northern Mexico. The bus was heading to Mexico City.

== Crash ==
Right before the crash, cars were seen still crossing over the tracks, including a motorcycle that was seconds away from being hit by the train. There were no signals or crossing gates stopping traffic from the train. The bus was 9 miles (14 km) into its route, when it got caught in the traffic. The bus driver tried beating the train across the railroad track. According to a family member of one of the passengers, the bus was hit by the train around 6:30 a.m. Two halves of the bus was seen on both sides of the tracks, with people on the top layer of the bus seen crawling out of the wreckage.

== Aftermath ==
The train line, Canadian Pacific Kansas City of Mexico, confirmed the accident and sent its condolences to the families of the victims. The Calgary, Canada-based company said its personnel were on site with authorities. The bus line Herradura de Plata said in a statement it was working with authorities and providing “medical, psychological, legal and logistical” help to those affected. The company spokesperson wrote that it “deeply regrets” the accident. The youngest person on the bus was 19 years old, and the oldest was 48. The driver fled the scene after the crash, and was later issued an arrest warrant. He was later found and arrested by authorities with charges of homicide.

== See also ==
- There were also other incidents that happened in the same week, such as:
  - 2025 Iztapalapa tank truck explosion
  - 2025 Merida highway crash
