= Leticia Userralde =

Mexican politician

- Born: 28 January 1961 (age 65); State of Mexico, Mexico
- Occupation: Politician
- Political party: PAN

Leticia Socorro Userralde Gordillo (born 28 January 1961) is a Mexican politician from the National Action Party (PAN). In the 2003 mid-terms she was elected to the Chamber of Deputies to represent the State of Mexico's 34th district during the 59th session of Congress (2003–2006).
