= María Elena Chávez Palacios =

Mexican politician

- Born: 5 July 1961 (age 64); State of Mexico, Mexico
- Occupation: Politician
- Political party: PAN

María Elena Lourdes Chávez Palacios (born 5 July 1961) is a Mexican politician from the National Action Party (PAN). In 2003 she served in the Chamber of Deputies during the 58th session of Congress representing the State of Mexico's 26th district.
