= 34th federal electoral district of the State of Mexico =

Federal electoral district of Mexico

State of Mexico's 34th
- Electoral district of the Chamber of Deputies of Mexico

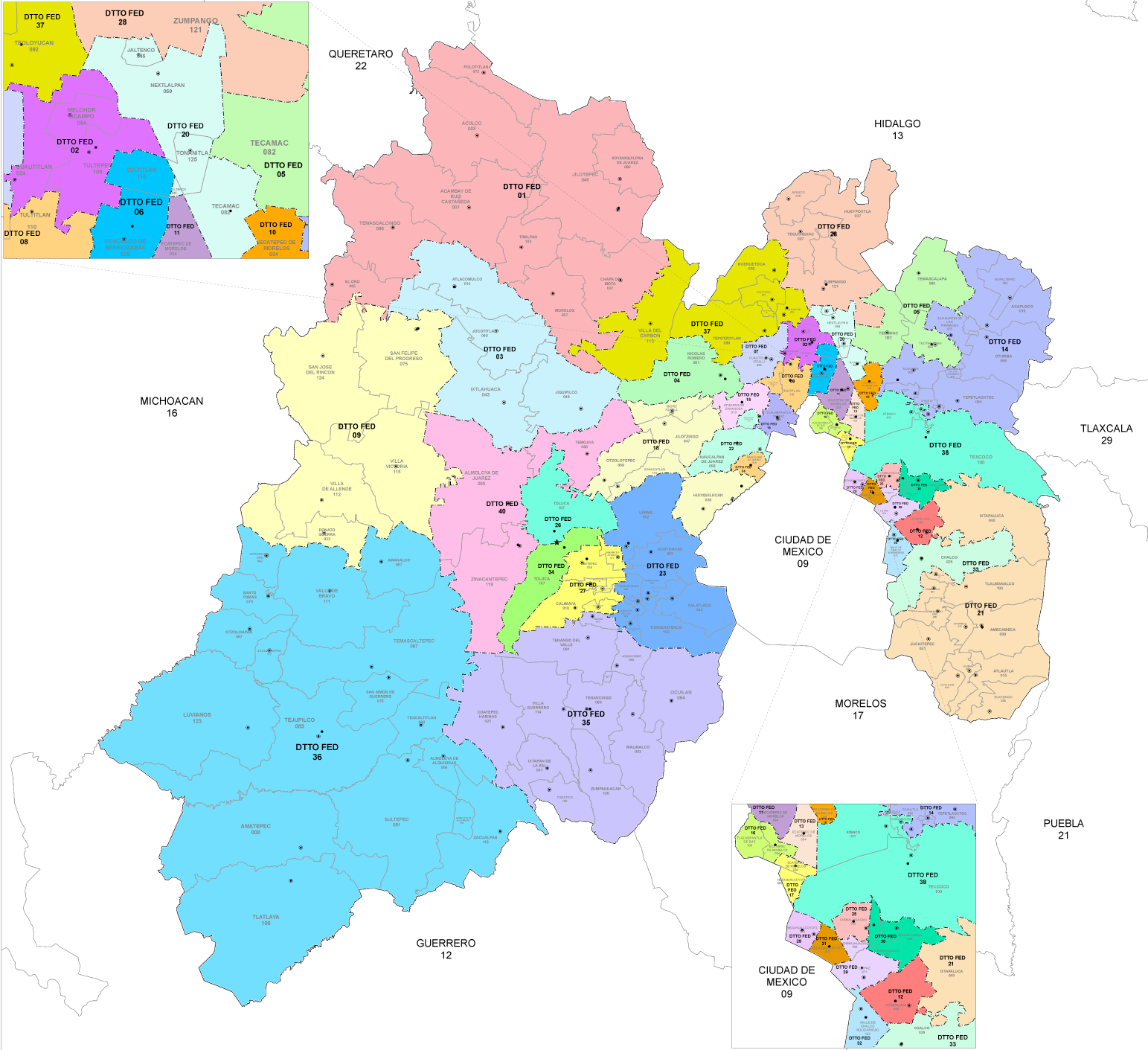
- State of Mexico's districts since 2023

Incumbent
- Member: Mónica Álvarez Nemer
- Party: ▌Morena
- Congress: 66th (2024–2027)

District
- State: State of Mexico
- Head town: Toluca de Lerdo
- Coordinates: 19°17′N 99°39′W
- Covers: Toluca (part)
- PR region: Fifth
- Precincts: 171
- Population: 460,299 (2020 census)

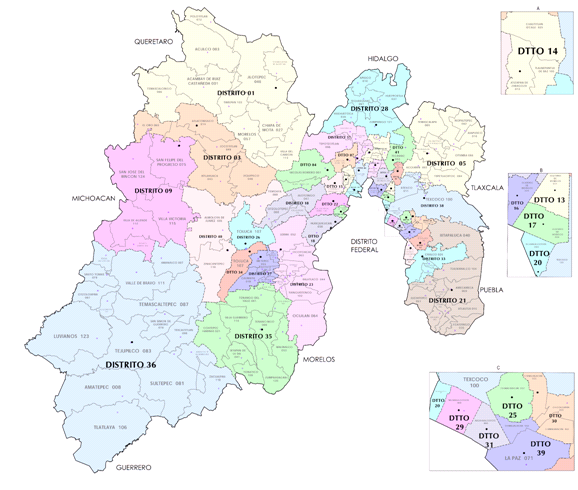
2017–2022 districting scheme

The 34th federal electoral district of the State of Mexico (Spanish: Distrito electoral federal 34 del Estado de México) is one of the 300 electoral districts into which Mexico is divided for elections to the federal Chamber of Deputies and one of 40 such districts in the State of Mexico.

It elects one deputy to the lower house of Congress for each three-year legislative session by means of the first-past-the-post system. Votes cast in the district also count towards the calculation of proportional representation ("plurinominal") deputies elected from the fifth region.

The 34th district was created by the 1977 electoral reforms, which increased the number of single-member seats in the Chamber of Deputies from 196 to 300. Under that plan, the State of Mexico's seat allocation rose from 15 to 34. The new districts were first contended in the 1979 mid-term election.

The current member for the district, elected in the 2024 general election, is Mónica Angélica Álvarez Nemer of the National Regeneration Movement (Morena).

== District territory ==
Under the 2023 districting plan adopted by the National Electoral Institute (INE), which is to be used for the 2024, 2027 and 2030 federal elections, the 34th district covers 171 electoral precincts (secciones electorales) in the southern portion of one of the state's 125 municipalities:

- Toluca (Note: The 26th district covers the rest of the municipality.)

The district's head town (cabecera distrital), where results from individual polling stations are gathered together and tallied, is the state capital, Toluca de Lerdo. In the 2020 census, the district reported a total population of 460,299.

== Previous districting schemes ==
Evolution of electoral district numbers
	1974	1978	1996	2005	2017	2023
State of Mexico	15	34	36	40	41	40
Chamber of Deputies	196	300				

Under the previous districting plans enacted by the INE and its predecessors, the 34th district was situated as follows:

2017–2022

163 electoral precincts in the municipality of Toluca. The head town was at Toluca de Lerdo.

2005–2017

The south-western portion of the municipality of Toluca.

1996–2005

The south-western portion of the municipality of Toluca.

1978–1996

The municipalities of Coacalco, Tultitlán and a portion of Tlalnepantla, with its head town at Tultitlán.

== Deputies returned to Congress ==
(Mexico) National parties
- Current
- PAN
- PRI
- PT
- PVEM
- MC
- Morena
- PAZ
- Somos
- Defunct or local only
- PLM
- PNR
- PRM
- PNM
- PP
- PPS
- PARM
- PFCRN
- CON
- PANAL
- PSD
- PES
- PES
- PRD

State of Mexico's 34th district
Election	Deputy	Party	Term	Legislature
1979	José María Téllez Rincón	Institutional Revolutionary Party	1979–1982	51st Congress
1982	María Elisa Alvarado Carrillo	Institutional Revolutionary Party	1982–1985	52nd Congress
1985	Lauro Rendón Castrejón	Institutional Revolutionary Party	1985–1988	53rd Congress
1988	Juan Ugarte Cortés	Institutional Revolutionary Party	1988–1991	54th Congress
1991	Fidel González Ramírez	Institutional Revolutionary Party	1991–1994	55th Congress
1994	Antonio Hernández Reyes	Institutional Revolutionary Party	1994–1997	56th Congress
1997	Enrique Tito González Isunza	Institutional Revolutionary Party	1997–2000	57th Congress
2000	Armando Enríquez Flores	National Action Party (Mexico)	2000–2003	58th Congress
2003	Leticia Userralde Gordillo	National Action Party (Mexico)	2003–2006	59th Congress
2006	Martín Óscar González Morán	National Action Party (Mexico)	2006–2009	60th Congress
2009	José Luis Velasco Lino	Institutional Revolutionary Party	2009–2012	61st Congress
2012	Alberto Curi Naime (Note: Curi Naime resigned his seat on 20 November 2014. González Vera, his alternate, was sworn in on 25 November.); Norma González Vera	Institutional Revolutionary Party	2012–2014; 2014–2015	62nd Congress
2015	Martha Hilda González Calderón	Institutional Revolutionary Party	2015–2018	63rd Congress
2018	Miroslava Carrillo Martínez	National Regeneration Movement	2018–2021	64th Congress
2021	María Teresa Castell de Oro Palacios	National Action Party (Mexico)	2021–2024	65th Congress
2024	Mónica Álvarez Nemer	National Regeneration Movement	2024–2027	66th Congress

== Presidential elections ==
State of Mexico's 34th district
Election	District won by	Party or coalition	%
2018	Andrés Manuel López Obrador	Juntos Haremos Historia	48.2258
2024	Claudia Sheinbaum Pardo	Sigamos Haciendo Historia	48.1537
