= Armando Enríquez Flores =

Mexican politician

- Born: 2 May 1963 (age 63); Durango, Durango, Mexico
- Occupations: Architect and politician
- Political party: PAN

Armando Enríquez Flores (born 2 May 1963) is a Mexican politician affiliated with the National Action Party (PAN).

In the 2006 general election he was elected to the Chamber of Deputies to represent the State of Mexico's 26th district during the 60th session of Congress.

He had previously sat in the Chamber of Deputies during the 58th congressional session (2000–2003) for the State of Mexico's 34th district, and in the Congress of the State of Mexico from 1997 to 2000. He was also municipal president of Toluca from 2003 to 2006.
