= 2025 Hermosillo convenience store fire =

Building fire in Mexico

- Location of Hermosillo municipality in Mexico
- Location of Waldo's
- Date: November 1, 2025
- Deaths: 24
- Injuries: 15

On November 1, 2025, a Waldo's convenience store in Hermosillo, Mexico, caught on fire, killing 24 and injuring 12. The fire took place during the Day of the Dead festival.

An investigation proved that the deaths were caused by inhalation of toxic gases. Sonora Attorney General Gustavo Salas said there was no evidence the fire resulted from an attack.

== Fire ==
Investigators identified an electrical transformer as the most likely cause of the fire. Before the fire, there were two blackouts which caused a lot of stress on the transformer. This causes an explosion which started the fire. Most of the deaths were caused due to inhalation of toxic gasses. Passerby videos also show a man burning to death outside of the store. Other injuries include a man with third-degree burns on 90 percent of his body, a woman who had to be taken to a hospital in Phoenix, Arizona, and a girl who was walking outside the store when the store exploded.

== Investigation ==
State authorities started an investigation into the store's safety measures, including fire suppression systems, emergency exits, and electrical infrastructure. The main transformer issue has led to an examination of maintenance records and building code compliance. Investigators also found that there was no emergency exit or fire extinguishers in the store.

== Reactions ==
Claudia Sheinbaum, the president of Mexico, sent her condolences to the families of the victims. She instructed Interior Secretary Rosa Icela Rodríguez to send assistance to the victims families and the injured. Waldo's lamented the deaths on social media and said it was collaborating with authorities.
