= José Luis Velasco =

Mexican politician

- Born: 22 April 1963 (age 63); Toluca, State of Mexico, Mexico
- Occupation: Politician
- Political party: PRI

José Luis Velasco Lino (born 22 April 1963) is a Mexican politician from the Institutional Revolutionary Party (PRI). In the 2009 mid-terms he was elected to the Chamber of Deputies to represent the State of Mexico's 34th district during the 61st session of Congress (2009–2012).
