= Aurora Castillo =

- Born: 1914
- Died: 1998 (aged 83–84)
- Organization: Mothers of East Los Angeles (MELA)
- Awards: Goldman Environmental Prize (1995)

Aurora Castillo (1914 – April 30, 1998) known as "la doña — a title of respect given to her by her largely Latino community — was an American environmentalist and community activist from Los Angeles, California. She co-founded the Mothers of East Los Angeles (MELA) in 1984. The MELA organization successfully opposed a planned building of a toxic waste incinerator and state prison in Eastside Los Angeles. Castillo was awarded the Goldman Environmental Prize in 1995.

== Early life ==
Aurora Castillo was born on January 1, 1914, a fourth-generation Mexican-American.

== Personal life ==
Castillo says that family has always been important to her. "Three years ago, Arthur Castillo, her only brother, died of cancer at 74. Her twin sister, who has been married and childless for 40 years, lives in Canoga Park. Another sister, Henrietta, 78, lives with Castillo in their childhood home." Her father, a U.S. Navy regimental sergeant bugler during World War I, was her hero. Castillo was also the great-great-granddaughter of Augustine Pedro Olvera, one of the original settlers of Los Angeles. She died of leukemia in 1998.

== Career ==
Aurora Castillo's career as an activist began in 1984 when she was 70 years old. The local priest of the East Los Angeles church asked the woman parishioners to protest the construction of a state prison in the neighborhood. The prison would have been the eighth in the area and the woman united to form MELA. The women were motivated to protect their children and did so by informing the community of the threat of having a prison in their neighborhood, executing protesting marches every Monday and uniting with other groups like the Coalition Against the Prison in East Los Angeles. The women of MELA also practiced othermothering as a means of uniting their community with the communal role of mothering each other's children (not just their own). Their view of mothering as a shared activity that would benefit all of their children was part of their collective identity and empowerment.

MELA continued to grow in size and experience. In 1987, the organization commenced a successful fight against the Lancer Project (a municipal waste incinerator). In 1988 MELA fought against another toxic waste incinerator. In 1989 MELA united with high school students from Huntington to halt a chemical waste treatment plant. Currently, MELA takes part in the water conservation program, leads a lead poison awareness program and sponsors higher education programs.

== Awards ==
Aurora Castillo was awarded the Goldman Environmental prize in 1995. She was the first person from Los Angeles, the first Latina, and the oldest person to win the award.
