= 2027 in Mexico =

- Decades: 2000s; 2010s; 2020s
- See also: History of Mexico; List of years in Mexico; Timeline of Mexican history

This article lists events occurring in Mexico during 2027. The list also contains names of the incumbents at federal and state levels and cultural and entertainment activities of the year.

== Events ==
=== Scheduled ===
- June – 2027 Mexican legislative election
- 23 July – 8 August – Mexico at the 2027 Pan American Games

== Holidays ==
- 1 January – New Year's Day
- 2 February – Constitution Day
- 15 March – Benito Juárez Day
- 2 April – Maundy Thursday
- 3 April – Good Friday
- 1 May – Labour Day
- 5 May – Cinco de Mayo
- 16 September – Independence Day
- 12 October – Día de la Raza
- 2 November – Day of the Dead
- 15 November – Revolution Day
- 12 December – Feast of Our Lady of Guadalupe
- 25 December – Christmas Day
