= Martín Óscar González Morán =

Mexican politician

Óscar González Morán
- Born: 23 February 1967 (age 59); State of Mexico, Mexico
- Occupation: Politician
- Political party: PAN

Martín Óscar González Morán (born 23 February 1967) is a Mexican politician affiliated with the National Action Party (PAN). In the 2006 general election he was elected to the Chamber of Deputies to represent the State of Mexico's 34th district during the 60th session of Congress.
