= Golden Gate Theater =

- U.S. National Register of Historic Places
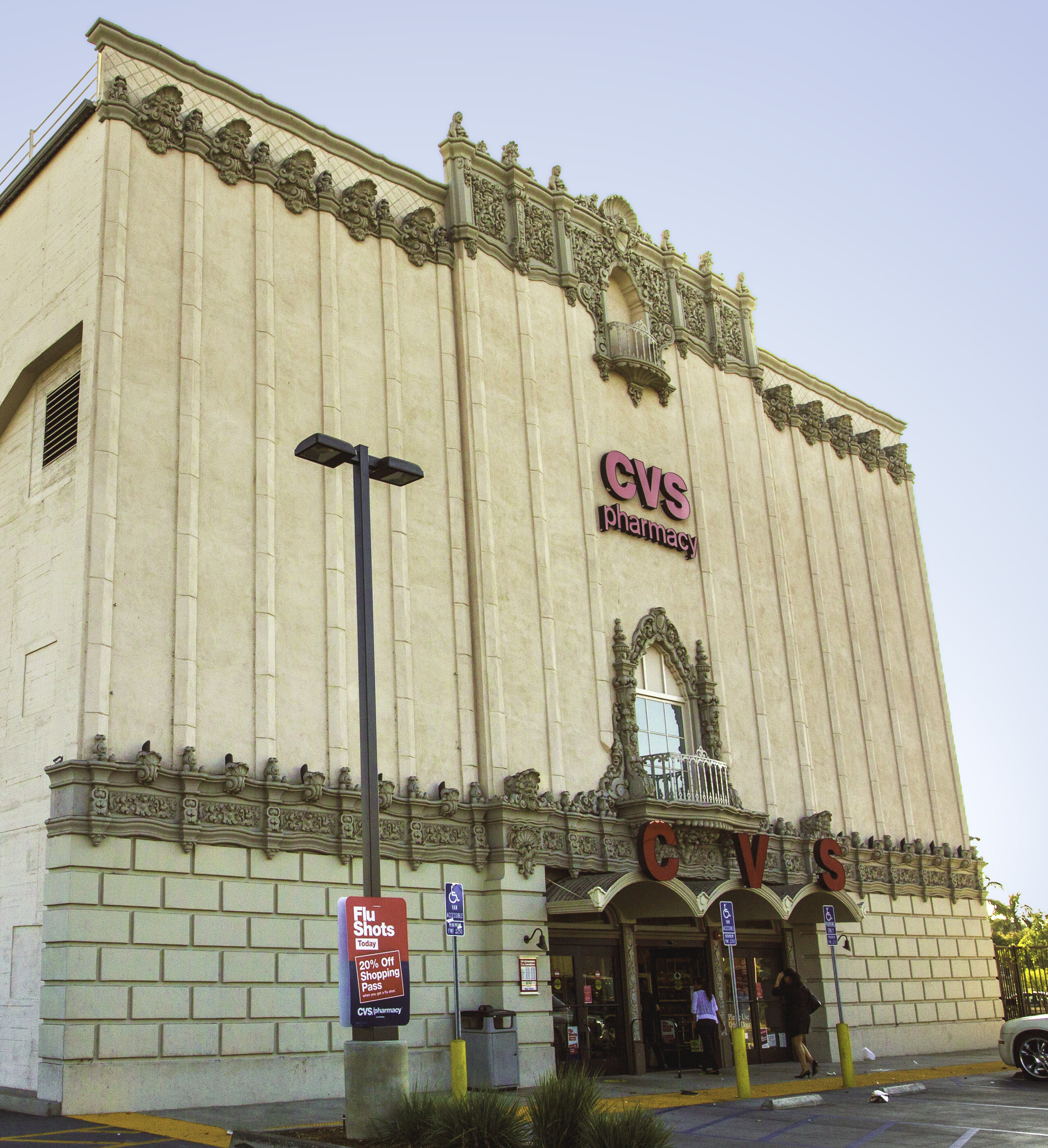
- Golden Gate Theater as CVS Pharmacy, 2013

- Location within the Los Angeles metropolitan area Location within California Location within the United States
- Location: 5170 E Whittier Blvd, East Los Angeles, California
- Coordinates: 34°1′12.5″N 118°9′28.3″W
- Built: 1927
- Architect: Balch Brothers; Vega Corp.
- Architectural style: California Churrigueresque
- NRHP reference No.: 82002192
- Added to NRHP: February 23, 1982

The Golden Gate Theater is a former California Churrigueresque-style movie palace built in 1927 on Whittier Boulevard in East Los Angeles, California. In 1982, it was listed on the National Register of Historic Places. The theater closed in 1986; the retail building built around it was damaged in the 1987 Whittier Narrows earthquake and demolished in 1992. The remaining theater building was left vacant for more than 20 years as preservationists fought with owners and developers over the future of the building. It was finally converted into a CVS Pharmacy and reopened in 2012.

== Theater building ==
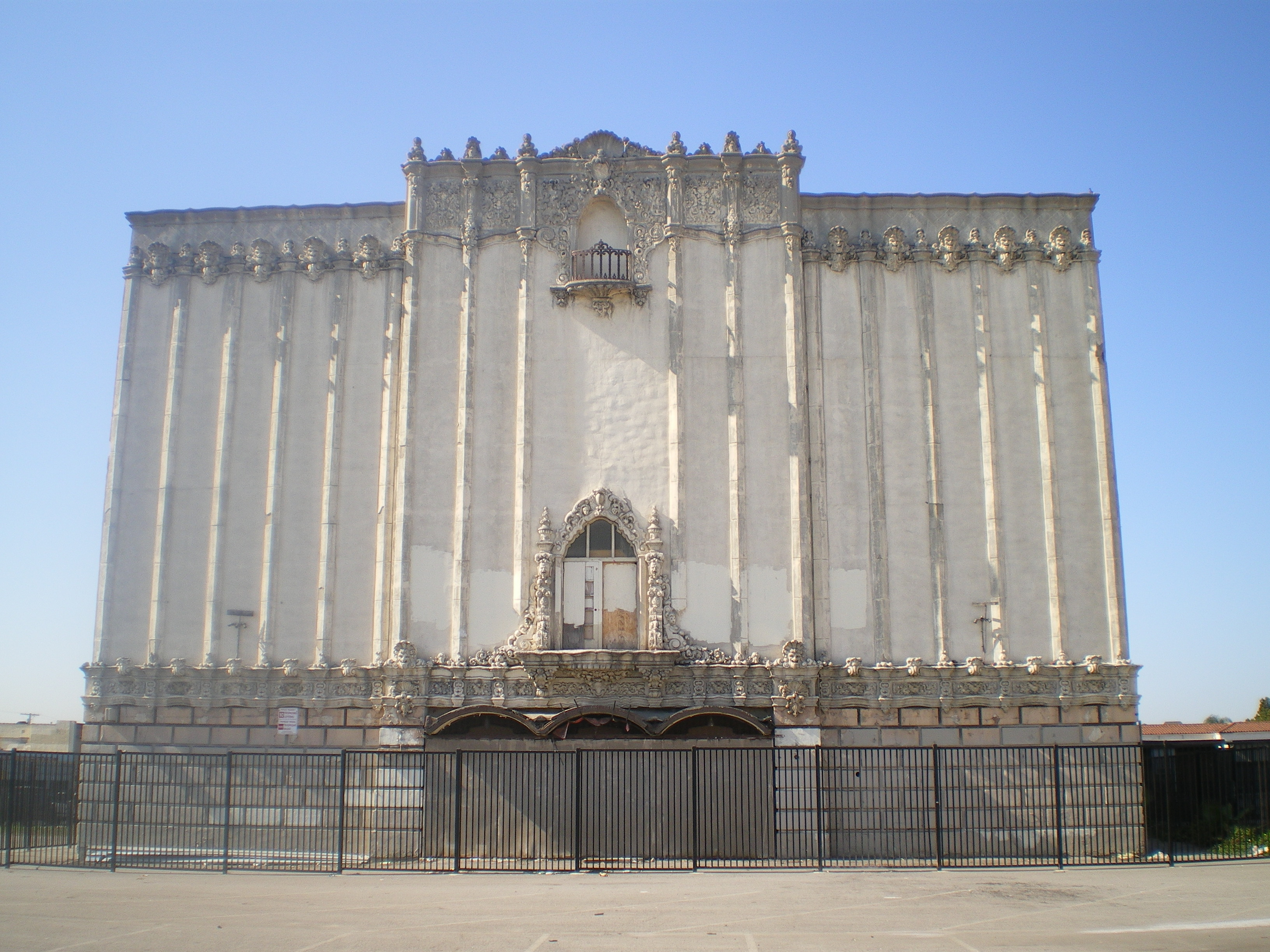
Old Theater, 5190 Whittier Blvd., Los Angeles

The theater seated nearly 1,500 people and was located at one of the major intersections on the east side of Los Angeles, at the corner of Whittier and Atlantic Boulevards. The theater was built by Peter Snyder, known as the "Father of the East Side," and designed by architects William and Clifford A. Balch, creators of the El Rey Theater on Wilshire Boulevard and the Pomona Fox Theater in Pomona, California. It was designed in the ornate Churrigueresque style, and the entrance replicated the portal of Spain's University of Salamanca. When plans for the theater were announced in 1927, the Los Angeles Times reported:

This week will mark the beginning of building operations on the theater project on Whittier Boulevard in Golden Gate Square. The theater proper will seat about 1500 persons, it is declared and will contain thirteen stores. There will also be several apartment units. It is planned as a legitimate playhouse, but will be equipped for motion pictures as well.

The theater was originally located in the courtyard of the L-shaped Vega Building, a retail structure that wrapped around the theater. The Vega Building was known for its four-story octagon tower.

Los Angeles County records describing the basis for the landmark designation describe the complex as one with "a sense of time and place. The majority of its structural features, including its conformation, detailing and decorative elements, have been unaltered. As a result, the building has clearly retained a sense of architectural integrity and original design."

== Closure and earthquake damage ==
Golden Gate Theater in 1980 with the Vega Building intact

The theater stopped showing movies in 1986, and in 1987 the Vega Building was damaged in the Whittier Narrows earthquake. From 1986 to 1988, a non-denominational Christian church named Praise Chapel Christian Fellowship occupied the building and held regular services with over 1,000 people. In 1987 the pastors, Mike and Donna Neville were forced to move their church because, according to the owner, the building was condemned following the Whittier earthquake. The Vega Building was demolished in 1992 after officials determined it to be a hazard. The remaining theater building was left sitting vacant in the middle of an otherwise empty lot. One writer notes that the remaining shell "only hints at what this theater was like in its heyday."

== Preservation battles ==
The property has been vacant and the subject of attempted demolitions for many years. When the Whittier earthquake damaged the Vega Building, demolition efforts accelerated. County inspectors declared the building unsafe for occupancy, and businesses operating in the building, including a jewelry store, a shoe repair shop, and a bowling alley, were evicted.

In 1988, demolition commenced before officials led by then County Supervisor Ed Edelman halted the work with a stop-work order. Demolition crews had already begun to dismantle the walls when Edelman, then Los Angeles City Councilwoman Gloria Molina, sheriff's deputies and more than 50 concerned community members showed up at the site to ensure the demolition work was halted. Edelman blamed a "foul-up" in the Public Works Department for issuing the demolition permit and assured the gathered crowd that heads were going to roll and that he would "try and stop this damn demolition before it happens."

In 1992, the Vega Building was razed, and in 1994, the family that had owned the property for 20 years sought to have the building removed from the National Register of Historic Places to clear the way for potential demolition of the theater. The Mothers of East Los Angeles and the Los Angeles Conservancy fought the demolition plans. The Conservancy noted that the theatre was one of fewer than two dozen buildings in Los Angeles in the Spanish Churrigueresque style. In August 1994, the Los Angeles County Board of Supervisors, on a motion by Supervisor Gloria Molina, designated the theatre as a "historical resource." The State Historical Resources Commission also rejected the owner's request to remove the theatre from the National Register of Historic Places.

In 2003, the property was acquired by M&A Gabaee, an affiliate of the Charles Co. Rumors spread that the new owner planned to convert the property into a Walgreens Drug Store. A representative of the owner told the Los Angeles Times: "We're in negotiations so everything is preliminary. We plan to keep the structure. The building is absolutely gorgeous. We want to maintain that but we also want to find what's going to work. We're looking forward to rejuvenating it." Preservationists expressed concerns that the new plans would preserve the outer shell of the building but gut or significantly alter the building's interior. In particular, concerns were raised that the theatre's soaring interior and proscenium arch would be replaced with a dropped ceiling. The founder of the East Los Angeles Center for the Performing Arts proposed converting the theatre into a performing arts venue: "It's an amazing theater. We were trying to get support to renovate and turn it into a performing arts venue. There's a drugstore on every corner here. I'd love to see the developer team up with us to preserve it."

As of 2008, the proposed conversion of the theatre was still the subject of ongoing preservation efforts by the Los Angeles Conservancy. The Conservancy stated that it sought to preserve historic interior features, including the proscenium, lobby, clamshell-shaped concession stand, and mezzanine level, while "encouraging the adaptive reuse of this long-vacant historic property."

On May 25, 2010, the Los Angeles County Board of Supervisors approved the conversion of the theater into a 24-hour drug store. It opened as a CVS on August 19, 2012.

== See also ==
- List of Registered Historic Places in Los Angeles
