= Praise Chapel Christian Fellowship =

Church in Los Angeles, United States of America

Coordinates: 33.9809°N 118.2145°W

The Praise Chapel Christian Fellowship is a church multiplication movement, centered in Los Angeles, California. Praise Chapel is an international family of churches and ministries, and as of February 26, 2019, Praise Chapel has grown to over 300 churches in the United States and over 4300 internationally.

== Vision ==
Praise Chapel Christian Fellowship's vision is summarized as the following: "Evangelize (win) the Lost, Disciple (build) the Believers and Multiply (send out) through Church Planting". This declaration is summarized as "Win-Build-Send".

== History ==
Before the Praise Chapel Christian Fellowship became an international fellowship, pastor Michael Neville and his family began their ministry after moving to southeast Los Angeles, from their original home church in Oklahoma. The small church was founded in Maywood, California as the "Rosewood Assembly" in May 1975.

Over the course of their ministry, Maywood had transitioned from a predominantly middle-class, white area, to a predominantly Hispanic community. Seeing this transition, Michael Neville viewed it to be imperative, that the demographic composition of a church within a community should reflect the community at large. Members who were not comfortable with change left the church, but the church soon began to take on a much more multicultural profile, recruiting even among young gang members, prostitutes and drug-dealers.

The church quickly began to grow through the conversion of the disparaged and rejected among the community, who would later on go to pastor their own churches. Since many of the new converts came from gangs and street-life, other denominations and fellowships refused to open doors for them to assimilate and pastor. Michael Neville then began to send these men and women out to pioneer churches under the umbrella of the Praise Chapel Christian Fellowship. The movement reached a zenith in 1980, after the first church was established in Ontario, California. Since that time, over 300 churches have been planted across the United States and a total of 4300 churches worldwide have been established. From 1986 to 1988 it used the former Golden Gate Theater building for services.

== After Michael Neville ==
Michael Neville died in January 1996 at 49 years of age. Thousands of lives have been greatly influenced by Pastor Neville's leadership. He often embraced those who had never experienced genuine acceptance and convinced them of their value and worth. Those great qualities gave those around him the confidence to enter into often difficult locations and situations.

His wife, Donna Neville, would eventually become the pastor of a church in Huntington Park, California. In recent years, Michael and Donna's son, Michael J. Neville, and his wife Jackie Neville, have been appointed as the lead pastors of Donna Neville's church, and Donna Neville would assume the role of senior pastor. The church continues to thrive with regular church planting.

After Michael Neville's death, Michael's brother Larry Neville became the senior leader of the movement. Larry pioneered churches in the United States, the Philippines and Singapore before returning to pastor a church in Rancho Cucamonga, California in 1994. Under his leadership, the movement has exploded around the world. The Praise Chapel Christian Fellowship has since, multiplied into a network of over 18 Fellowships in the US and many more internationally. Larry has written a number of books on church planting, and manifestos on organizing and structuring global movements.

== International work ==
Praise Chapel goes to other nations in the world through their mission, Praise Chapel Missions. Praise Chapel is on a mission to send their people to other nations to harvest souls for Jesus Christ. Praise Chapel is a church planting movement, with churches in Ghana, Kenya, South Africa, Ethiopia, Kurdistan, Spain, England, France, Estonia, the Netherlands, The Philippines, Hong Kong, Malaysia, Indonesia, and many more nations. London. Praise Chapel is also the first church to establish a location in Iraq. Praise Chapel has many other churches in Estonia, China, Germany, Indonesia, Mexico, Vietnam, the Philippines, American Samoa, Israel, Cuba, Nicaragua, Peru, Colombia and many more churches in South America.

== Conferences ==
For years Praise Chapel held a World Bible Conference every year and then every two years. After the 2010 Globality Bible Bible Conference the Fellowship multiplied into 18 Fellowships called a Family of Fellowships. In 2009, PCCF President Larry Neville announced the theme of the 2010 World Conference: "Globality: The Gospel to Everyone, By Anyone, From Anywhere. It was also announced that 2010 marks the last central World Conference for PCCF due to growth in the fellowship. Praise Chapel also holds further Bible Conferences in other parts of the United States and other countries. Yearly, Praise Chapel have Youth Conferences, Men's Conferences, Women's' Conferences, Pastor's Retreats, and Marriage Retreats.
