= Fernando Zamora Morales =

Mexican politician

- Born: 30 May 1961 (age 64); State of Mexico, Mexico
- Occupation: Politician
- Political party: PRI

Fernando Zamora Morales (born 30 May 1961) is a Mexican politician affiliated with the Institutional Revolutionary Party (PRI). In the 2012 general election he was elected to the Chamber of Deputies to represent the State of Mexico's 26th district during the 62nd session of Congress.
