= Martha Tamayo =

Mexican lawyer and politician

Vice President of the Chamber of Deputies
- In office 6 February 2018 – 31 August 2018
- President: Edgar Romo García
- Preceded by: Martha Hilda González
- Succeeded by: Dolores Padierna

Personal details
- Born: Martha Sofía Tamayo Morales; 18 September 1951 (age 74) Mazatlán, Sinaloa, Mexico
- Party: PRI
- Education: Autonomous University of Sinaloa
- Occupation: Lawyer and politician

Martha Sofía Tamayo Morales (born 18 September 1951) is a Mexican lawyer and politician affiliated with the Institutional Revolutionary Party (PRI).

Tamayo Morales has served in both chambers of Congress. From 1998 to 2000 she sat in the Chamber of Deputies as the alternate of Gustavo Adolfo Guerrero Ramos, representing Sinaloa's 5th district during the 57th Congress. In the 2000 general election she was elected to the Senate, where she served during the 58th and 59th Congresses. Some years later, in the 2015 mid-terms, she was elected to the Chamber of Deputies as a plurinominal deputy for the first electoral region during the 63rd Congress.
