= Mexican Federal Highway 190D =

Highway in Mexico

Federal Highway 190D
- Carretera federal 190D

Route information
- Maintained by Secretariat of Communications and Transportation

Location
- Country: Mexico

Highway system
- Mexican Federal Highways; List; Autopistas

Federal Highway 190D is the tolled Federal Highway that parallels Federal Highway 190. Highways with the 190D signage are in the states of Oaxaca and Chiapas.

== Oaxaca: Autopista Mitla-Tehuantepec ==
Autopista Mitla-Tehuantepec
- Location: Fed. 190 at San Pablo Villa Mitla to Fed. 185D near Tehuantepec, Oaxaca
- Length: 169.23 km (105.15 mi)

The westernmost segment of Highway 190D, numbered for the first time in 2017, is currently under construction. It will serve as a major transportation backbone connecting the Isthmus region of the state to the capital of Oaxaca de Juárez. The concession for the 169.23-kilometre (105.15 mi) highway was initially held by the Autovía unit of Empresas ICA but sold to IDEAL, a Carlos Slim company, in February 2017 after ICA entered into financial trouble, along with the concession to operate the Túnel Diamante in Acapulco.

Highway 190D currently existed as two unconnected roads for over a decade. The western segment connects San Pablo Villa Mitla to Santa María Albarradas. The eastern segment of 40 kilometres (25 mi) opened in March 2016 and connects Mexico Federal Highway 185D, the bypass of the Istmo region, to Santiago Lachiguiri.

The highway is now passable from Tehuantepec to Oaxaca city. It was inaugurated on January 25, 2025 but still has some sections under construction. Travel time of the stretch is about 2 hours with detours and costs 227 MXN at two toll booths.

When complete, this highway will have 66 bridges and three tunnels, and it will provide an estimated time savings of two hours compared to Mexico Federal Highway 190 along the same route.

== Chiapas: Ocozocuautla-Arriaga ==
Autopista Ocozocuautla-Arriaga
- Location: Fed. 190 in Arriaga to Fed. 190D in Ocozocuautla
- Length: 93.77 km (58.27 mi)

Officially Highway 200D exists but signed as 190D throughout its route to match its sister highway, the highway from Ocozocuautla to Arriaga and is one of the two segments signed as Highway 190D in Chiapas and operated by Concesionaria de Autopistas del Sureste, S.A. de C.V. The toll for the entire course for an automobile is 146 pesos through four toll zones. It was inaugurated on August 8, 2010.

== Chiapas: Tuxtla Gutiérrez-San Cristóbal de las Casas ==
Autopista Tuxtla Gutiérrez-San Cristóbal de las Casas
- Location: Fed. 190 in Chiapa de Corzo, Chiapas to Periférico de San Cristóbal de las Casas
- Length: 46 km (29 mi)

CAS also operates the highway between Tuxtla Gutiérrez and San Cristóbal de las Casas, the two major cities in central Chiapas. The toll for the entire route is 50 pesos. It opened on May 15, 2006.
