= Alberto Curi Naime =

Mexican politician

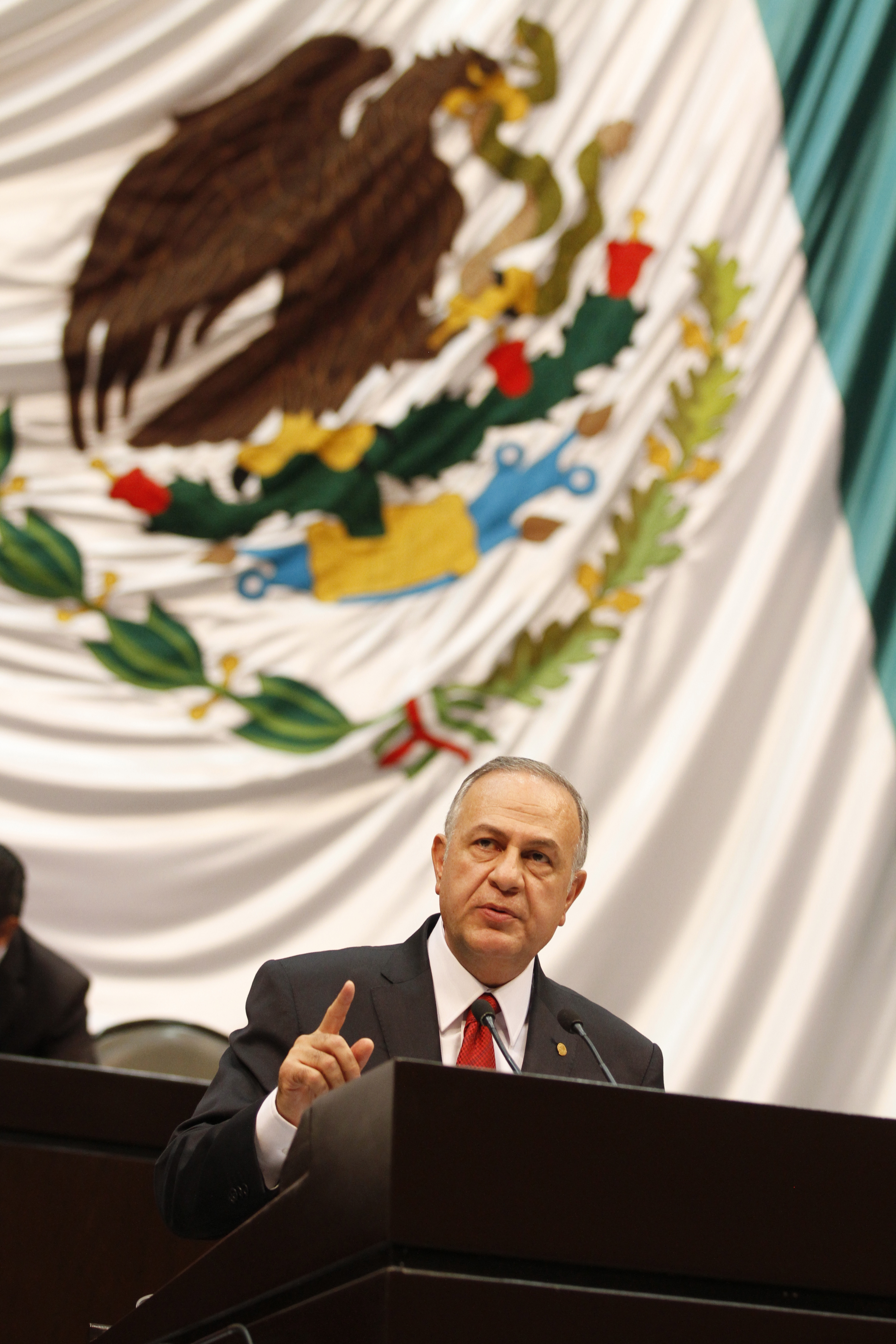
- Born: 23 August 1956 (age 70); Toluca, State of Mexico, Mexico
- Education: UAEM
- Occupation: Politician
- Political party: PRI

Alberto Curi Naime (born 23 August 1956) is a Mexican politician affiliated with the Institutional Revolutionary Party (PRI).

He has been elected to the Chamber of Deputies on two occasions: in the 1997 mid-terms, for the State of Mexico's 26th district, and in the 2012 general election for the state's 34th district.
