= Mariana Gándara Salazar =

Mexican theatre director (1984–2025)

- Born: 1984
- Died: August 20, 2025
- Occupations: Playwright; theater director

Mariana Gándara Salazar (1984 – August 20, 2025) was a Mexican playwright and theater director.

== Life and career ==
Gándara Salazar obtained a degree in Dramatic Literature and Theater from the National Autonomous University of Mexico (UNAM). She joined Artillería Producciones in 2007 before studying at the Central Saint Martins University of the Arts in London.

Her first play "Nobody belongs here more than you" won her an award at the 18th National University Theater Festival. She went on to create other plays including "Mar de fuchi" (2012), "Ghostly Matters-Collective Hallucinations" (2013) and "The Last Reef in the Third Dimension" (2013-2014).

Gándara Salazar died in Mexico City on August 20, 2025, at the age of 41.
