= Héctor Javier Hernández =

Mexican politician

- Born: 22 December 1958 (age 67); Cuernavaca, Morelos, Mexico
- Education: UAEM
- Occupation: Politician
- Political party: PAN

Héctor Javier Hernández Genis (born 22 December 1958) is a Mexican politician affiliated with the National Action Party. He served as Senator of the LIX Legislature of the Mexican Congress representing Morelos as replacement of Marco Antonio Adame.
