= Juan Carlos Núñez Armas =

Mexican politician

- Born: 15 May 1964 (age 62); Maravatío, Michoacán, Mexico
- Occupation: Politician
- Political party: PAN
- Website: https://web.archive.org/web/20130523123826/http://juancarlos.org.mx/

Juan Carlos Núñez Armas (born 15 May 1964) is a Mexican politician affiliated with the National Action Party (PAN). In the 2003 mid-terms he was elected to the Chamber of Deputies to represent the State of Mexico's 26th district during the 59th session of Congress.

He also served as municipal president of Toluca from 2000 to 2003.
