= Daniel Bisogno =

Mexican television presenter, actor and comedian (1973–2025)

- Born: Daniel Omar Aguilar Bisogno; 19 May 1973; Mexico City, Mexico
- Died: 20 February 2025 (aged 51); Mexico City, Mexico
- Occupations: Comedian; actor; television presenter
- Years active: 1996–2025
- Television: Ventaneando
- Spouses: Mariana Zavala (m. 2001; div. 2005) Cristina Riva Palacio (m. 2014; div. 2019)
- Children: 1

Daniel Omar Aguilar Bisogno (19 May 1973 – 20 February 2025) was a Mexican television presenter, actor and comedian, known for being one of the three journalists of the television program Ventaneando.

== Early life and career ==
Bisogno was born on 19 May 1973 in Mexico City.

From a very young age, he showed a great interest in the media and began his career in television during the 90s. His big opportunity came when he joined the team of "Ventaneando", the famous TV Azteca entertainment program that is hosted by Pati Chapoy and deals with gossip and television analysis. Over time, he established himself as one of the most prominent voices of the program, standing out for his direct and sarcastic style when commenting on the world of entertainment. In addition to his work as a host, Bisogno also explored acting and comedy, participating in plays such as "El Tenorio Cómico" and bringing to life various characters in comedy shows. He also worked as a radio host and participated in the dubbing of animated films.

== Personal life ==
Bisogno was the great-nephew of Angélica Ortiz who in turn was the mother of the actress and singer Angélica María, by virtue of this Bisogno was second nephew of Angélica María and second cousin of her daughter, Angélica Vale.

In 2001 Bisogno married the journalist Mariana Zavala, but they divorced in 2005 without having children. In 2012, he met Cristina Riva Palacio whom he married two years later. From this marriage his first and only daughter, Michaela, was born in 2016. The couple divorced in 2019.

=== Illness and death ===
From May 2023, Bisogno was hospitalized for a liver complication, due to the rupture of an esophageal varix. That was only the beginning of a series of medical complications, such as the removal of the gallbladder, a liver transplant and a lung infection. He managed to rejoin the program, administering antibiotics intravenously, but his health was monitored by medical personnel, which limited him in public appearances near the studio.

On 2 February 2025, his brother, Alex Bisogno, revealed that Bisogno suffered from multiple organ failure, in the case of a bile duct infection, and underwent hemodialysis, he was fed by tube. Bisogno was in intensive care until he died on the night of 20 February at the Ángeles del Pedregal Hospital, at the age of 51, due to medical complications from a liver and kidney transplant.
