= Héctor Hernández Silva =

Mexican politician

- Born: 17 September 1964 (age 61); Toluca, State of Mexico, Mexico
- Occupation: Politician
- Political party: PRI

Héctor Hernández Silva (born 17 September 1964) is a Mexican politician from the Institutional Revolutionary Party (PRI). From 2009 to 2012 he served in the Chamber of Deputies during the 61st session of Congress representing the State of Mexico's 26th district.
