= Martha Hilda González Calderón =

Mexican lawyer and politician (1965–2025)

Vice President of the Chamber of Deputies
- In office 5 September 2017 – 6 February 2018
- President: Jorge Carlos Ramírez Marín
- Preceded by: Javier Bolaños Aguilar
- Succeeded by: Martha Tamayo

Member of the Chamber of Deputies for State of Mexico's 34th district
- In office 1 September 2015 – 31 August 2018
- Preceded by: Norma González Vera
- Succeeded by: Miroslava Carrillo Martínez

Municipal President of Toluca
- In office 1 January 2013 – 12 February 2015
- Preceded by: Guillermo Legorreta Martínez
- Succeeded by: Braulio Antonio Álvarez Jasso

Personal details
- Born: 13 August 1965 State of Mexico, Mexico
- Died: 29 January 2025 (age 59) United Kingdom
- Party: PRI
- Education: School for Advanced Studies in the Social Sciences; Paris Dauphine University
- Alma mater: Universidad Autónoma del Estado de México
- Occupation: Politician
- Profession: Lawyer

Martha Hilda González Calderón (13 August 1965 – 29 January 2025) was a Mexican lawyer and politician from the Institutional Revolutionary Party (PRI).

In the 2015 mid-terms she was elected to the Chamber of Deputies to represent the State of Mexico's 34th district during the 63rd session of Congress.

== Background ==
González Calderón received her law degree from the Universidad Autónoma del Estado de México in 1987 and immediately became the Director of Social Promotion in Toluca; after two years, she transitioned into a citizen attention position in Toluca's second district. In 1990, she became an alternate local deputy to the 51st session of the Congress of the State of Mexico, while she served as a women's leader and municipal councilor in the local PRI and pursued her master's degree in Political Sociology from the School for Advanced Studies in the Social Sciences in Paris. Two years after graduating with her master's in 1993, she received her doctorate degree in the same discipline from the Paris Dauphine University. She went on to teach French and political analysis.

González Calderón died on 29 January 2025, at the age of 59. She had undergone surgery on 20 January and was recuperating in the United Kingdom.

== Career ==
=== Return to Mexico ===
In the late 1990s, González Calderón's Mexican political career resumed. She became a deputy attorney for the Toluca Valley in 1999 and left that position to spend a year as the environmental secretary of the State of Mexico, between 2001 and 2002. A year later, voters sent her to the 55th session of the Congress of the State of Mexico, where she presided over the Political Coordination Board and the Commission for the Prosecution and Administration of Justice. During this time, from 2004 to 2007, she served on the board of the State of Mexico Institute of Public Administration, A.C.

After her three-year term as a state deputy, González went to the federal Chamber of Deputies for the 60th Congress as a plurinominal deputy, during which time she was vice president of its board of directors and served on commissions including Metropolitan Development, National Defense, Environment and Natural Resources, Special on Femicides, and Special on Non-Discrimination.

With her first term in San Lázaro over, González Calderón briefly returned to the state government with a brief stint as the secretary of tourism, a position she left after just one year in order to become the PRI's general secretary in the State of Mexico. In 2012, she was tapped as president of the PRI in Toluca.

=== Municipal presidency ===
In 2012, voters elected González Calderón from a coalition including the PRI, PVEM and Nueva Alianza to become the new municipal president of Toluca beginning on 1 January 2013; she received just over half the vote. During her tenure, Toluca was awarded by the Mexican Competitiveness Institute for leading the nation in budget transparency in 2014. Social media users criticized her in 2013 for allegedly ordering a culling of stray dogs in the city.

=== Back to San Lázaro ===
In January 2015, González Calderón asked for permission to permanently step aside as mayor of Toluca in order to run for federal deputy in the 2015 mid-terms. She won the seat for the 34th district, one of several including Toluca, and sat on the Competitiveness, Public Education and Educational Services, and Government Commissions.
