= Juan Núñez de Lara =

Juan Núñez de Lara may refer to:

- Juan Núñez I de Lara the Fat (died 1294)
- Juan Núñez II de Lara, fought for and against King Ferdinand IV of Castile, took the city of Gibraltar from the Moors
- Juan Núñez III de Lara, Lord of Lara and Biscay
