= 2025 Merida highway crash =

Highway crash in Mexico

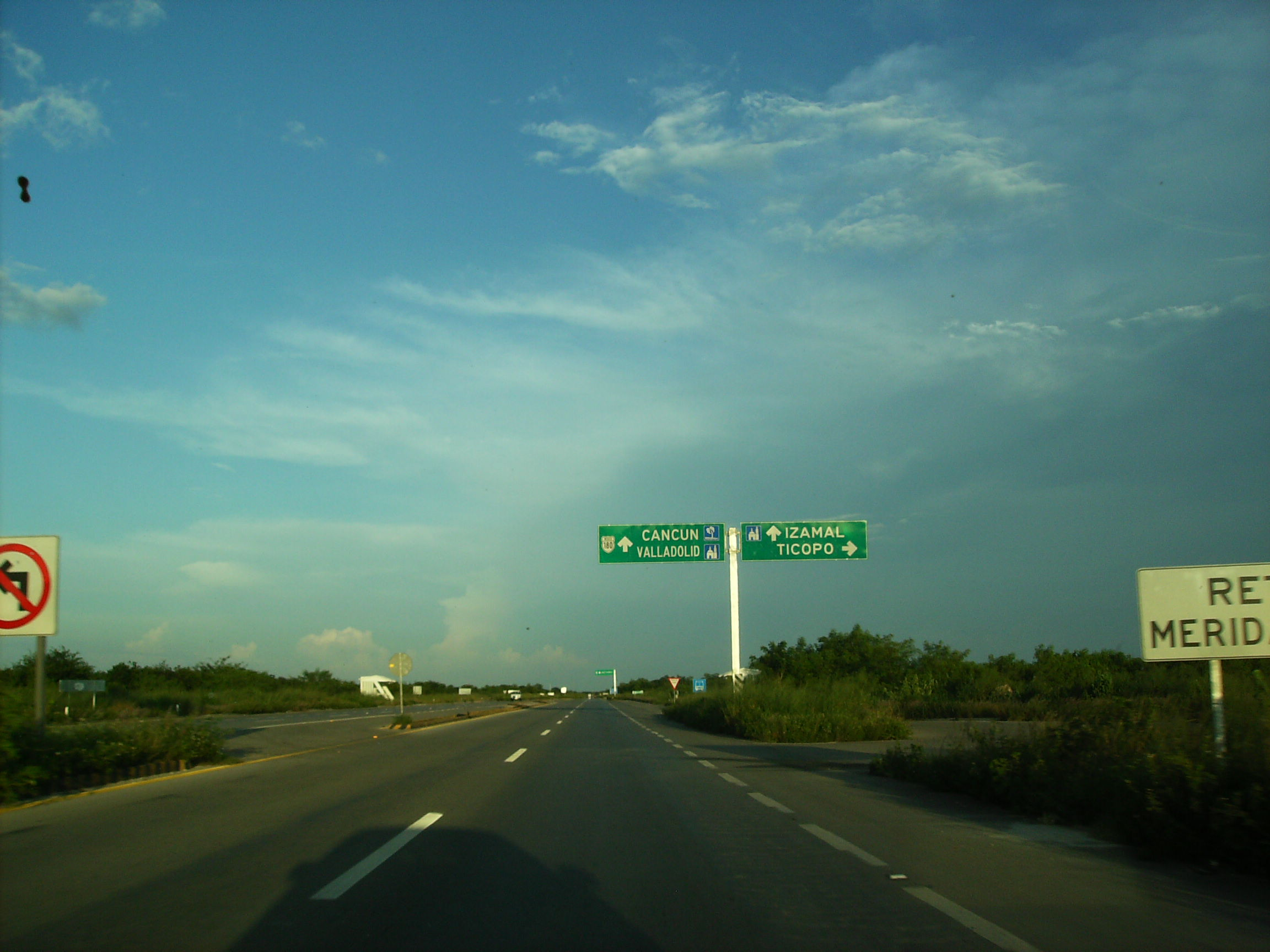
- Part of the Mexican Federal Highway 180 going towards Cancun

Details
- Date: 13 September 2025
- Location: Mérida, Yucatán, Mexico

Statistics
- Vehicles: 3
- Deaths: 16
- Injured: 1

On September 13, 2025, 16 people were killed and two people injured in a three-vehicle accident in Yucatán. The vehicles collided on a section of the Federal Highway 180 south of the city of Merida; one vehicle burst into flames.

== Crash ==
At kilometer 127, in the Chocholá-Kopomá section of the Mérida–Campeche federal highway, a van full of construction workers tried overtaking a private car, but lost control and hit a company beer truck. The van burst into flames almost immediately after being hit. Some of the people were killed being thrown from the van, while at least five died from being trapped during the fire. The impact was so violent that bodies were seen scattered around the pavement. The death toll was originally 15 people, but authorities later found another burned body in the wreckage.

== Aftermath ==
Firefighters, the National Guard, municipal police, and forensic teams were sent out to secure the crash site and to remove the bodies laying out on the pavement. The section of the highway was completely closed in both directions while removal of damaged vehicles and cleaning of the asphalt layer took place. Yucatan's Governor, Joaquin Diaz Mena, issued a statement expressing condolences and affirming the support for the victims' families.
