= Mexican Federal Highway 185D =

Toll highway in Mexico

Federal Highway 185D
- Carretera federal 185D
- Autopista Salina Cruz-La Ventosa

Route information
- Maintained by Caminos y Puentes Federales (Red FONADIN)
- Length: 75.39 km (46.85 mi)

Major junctions
- North end: Fed. 200 in Salina Cruz, Oaxaca
- Fed. 190 west of Tehuantepec, Oaxaca; Fed. 185 north of La Ventosa, Oaxaca
- South end: Fed. 190 in La Ventosa, Oaxaca

Location
- Country: Mexico
- State: Oaxaca

Highway system
- Mexican Federal Highways; List; Autopistas

Federal Highway 185D(Carretera Federal) is a toll highway in the southern portion of Oaxaca. It serves as a bypass of the cities in the Istmo region and connects Salina Cruz to La Ventosa. The highway is maintained by Caminos y Puentes Federales, which charges 95 pesos per car to travel the full course of the route.
