= Alberto Padilla =

Mexican journalist (1965–2025)

Alberto Padilla (January 9, 1965 – August 29, 2025) was a Mexican journalist and television presenter.

== Life and career ==
Padilla was born in Monterrey on January 9, 1965. He was a financial news anchor for CNN en Español and hosted the program Economía y Finanzas, the only daily financial, economic and business news program in Spanish with a continental reach.

In September 2013 he began to host a segment on the Argentine channel Infobae TV through the internet. In August 2018 he began hosting the program "A las 5 con Alberto Padilla" on the Radio station CRC 89.1 in Costa Rica.

Padilla died on August 29, 2025, at the age of 60.
