= Juana Gutierrez =

Mexican-American political activist (1931/1932–2025)

Juana Beatriz Gutierrez (1931 or 1932 – April 28, 2025) was an American political activist and community organizer.

== Life and career ==
Gutierrez was born in Mexico. In 1954, she married Ricardo Gutiérrez and in 1956 the couple moved to Los Angeles where they had nine children. They lived in Los Angeles for forty-three years.

She founded Madres de Este Los Angeles Santa Isabel (MELASI) which defeated a proposal to build a prison near her home, and later a proposal to place a toxic dump and oil pipeline nearby. This organization, composed of neighborhood residents of Vernon in East Los Angeles, has worked to ensure that their members' community secures safe conditions to live in. According to the National Women's History Project, MELASI also helped with the problems of "crime, unemployment, failing schools, dangerous working conditions, and pesticide-filled foods". They established a scholarship fund, giving more than $300,000 to local students, and a water conservation program that employed 22 people and built a community garden. Further, MELASI also partnered with other grassroots organizations like the Greenpeace and the National Resources Defense Council to promote environmental well-being among the community. Gutierrez died on April 28, 2025, at the age of 93.

== Legacy ==
Gutierrez's work has been featured in the former Soviet Union, Australia, and Europe. Her archives are in the Urban Archive Collection at the University Library at California State University, Northridge.
