= 2025 Iztapalapa tank truck explosion =

Tank truck explosion in Iztapalapa, Mexico

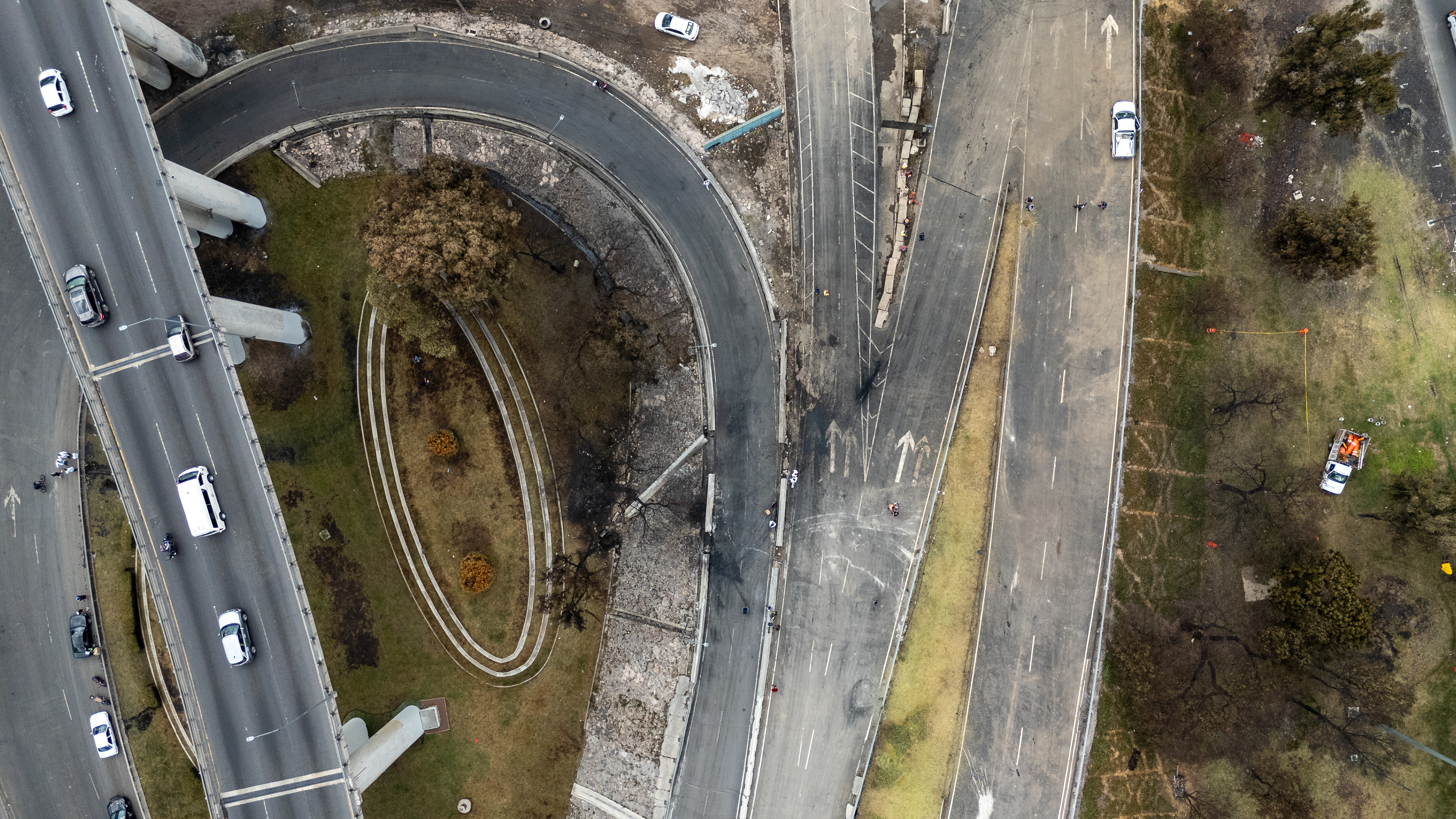
- An aerial view of the scene after the explosion
- Date: 10 September 2025
- Time: c. 2:20 p.m. (CST)
- Venue: La Concordia Highway Interchange
- Location: Iztapalapa, Mexico City, Mexico; 19°21′31.42″N 98°59′44.03″W
- Type: Gas explosion
- Cause: Overspeed at the curve
- Deaths: 32
- Injuries: 90+

On 10 September 2025, at approximately 2:20 p.m. (local time), a liquefied petroleum gas tank truck, property of company Gas Silza, overturned and exploded on the La Concordia Highway Interchange in Iztapalapa, Mexico City, while containing 49,500 liters of LPG, causing the deaths of 32 people, and injuring 90 others.

In December 2025, Mexico City's Attorney General's Offices declared the official cause was loss of control over the vehicle due to excessive speeding in a high-speed turn.

== Background ==
Mexico has experienced several accidents related to fuel transportation, particularly tanker truck accidents. One of the most serious incidents occurred in 2013, in Ecatepec de Morelos when a tank truck explosion killed 27 people and injured over 30 others. At the time, Mexican regulations allowed these vehicles to operate on two-lane highways with loads of up to 80 metric tons and lengths exceeding 30 meters (100 feet), in contrast to the U.S. limit for interstate highways of 40 tons. Following the accident, the Mexican government announced a reduction to these limits. However, the proliferation of makeshift housing near highways has contributed to such events generating more devastating consequences, both in terms of human and material losses.

Mexico City has been the recurring scene of explosions associated with the transportation of Liquefied petroleum gas (LPG). In 2002, in Colonia del Valle, a Petróleos Mexicanos tanker truck transporting 20,000 liters of 87 octanes gasoline overturned and caused a large-scale fire, with flames exceeding ten meters in height. More recently, in Milpa Alta, incidents were recorded in 2019 and 2022. The first left several injured, while the second generated alarm due to the vehicle's proximity to a gas station, which could have led to a larger explosion. In May 2025, on the Anillo Periférico in the Lomas de Chapultepec area, a Pemex tanker truck carrying 31,500 liters of gasoline overturned and hit a column on the second floor of the road, releasing approximately 20,000 liters of fuel. The area was evacuated, but no ignition occurred, so an explosion was avoided.

The company that owns the unit involved in the accident was Gas Silza, a subsidiary of Grupo Tomza. This conglomerate has faced various controversies. In 2009, after the 2009 Swan Islands earthquake, one of its subsidiaries was singled out for alleged gas leaks at its facilities and for failure to comply with previously established agreements. In 2013, an explosion was recorded at a liquefied petroleum gas distribution plant belonging to the group, which prompted the Secretariat of Energy to send inspectors. During the inspection of 28 pipes, irregularities were detected: 16 presented administrative failures, 11 were not registered with SENER as part of the authorized vehicle fleet, and 5 had expired valves. As a result, the company was fined 52 million pesos.

Later, in 2017, the Energy Regulatory Commission placed several companies, including Tomza, under surveillance for alleged monopolistic practices. By 2025, the Secretariat of Environment and Natural Resources reported that Silza had not submitted applications for the registration of liability insurance policies covering possible environmental damage resulting from its hydrocarbon transportation operations. The company denied the accusations. However, the same agency assured that the policy of the storage plant where the tanker had been loaded had expired in June 2025. Hours later, Silza spoke again, stating that they had activated the corresponding insurance policies after the accident, including those that, according to SEMARNAT, they did not process. To date, the government agency has not rectified or modified its statements.

=== Location ===
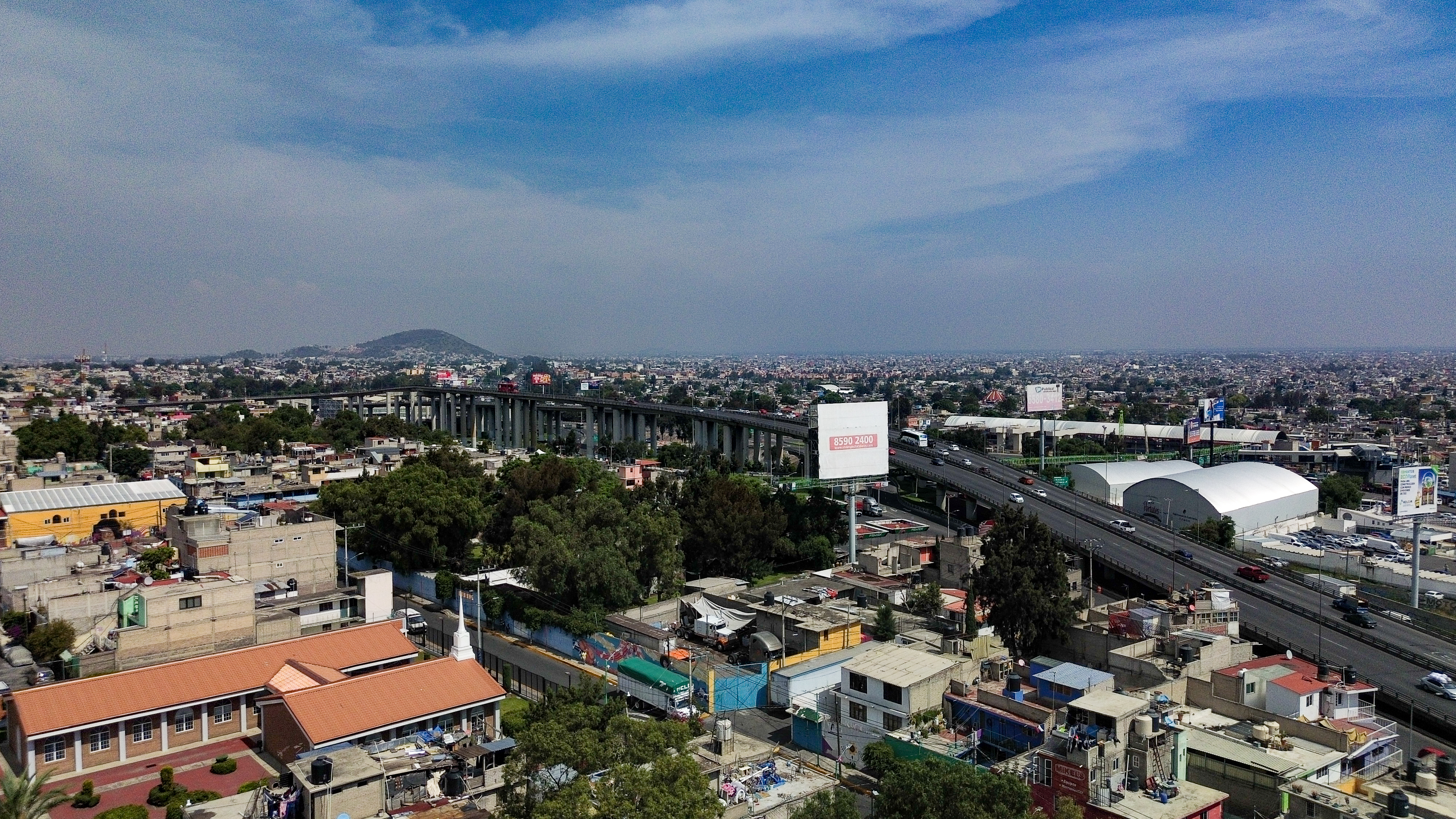
The La Concordia interchange, pictured in 2023

The explosion occurred on the La Concordia interchange, opened in 2007 to connect Mexico City with the Mexico–Puebla Highway and the Mexico–Texcoco Highway. The interchange was designed with a capacity of up to 1,600 vehicles per hour; however, its obsolescence has been noted due to the high traffic levels recorded in the area.

The area is served by a variety of public transportation, including a metro station expected to carry 2,569,785 people annually by 2025, as well as a cable car system and an elevated trolleybus system that was estimated to carry 120,000 people in the same year. In addition, several bus routes pass through the area, creating a constant flow of vehicles. The timing of the incident coincided with periods around rush hour, when traffic in the city tends to back up.

== Accident ==
=== Prior to the explosion ===
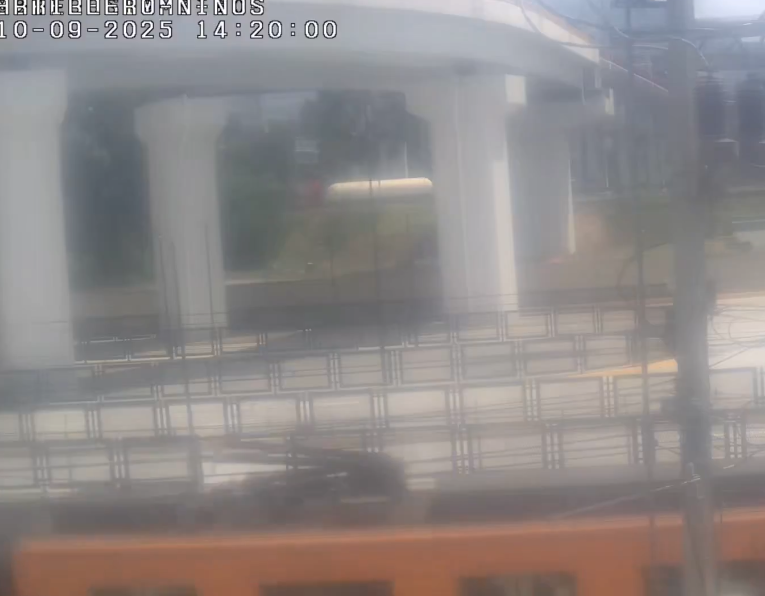
The crashed truck, seen at 14:20:00, was heading toward the curve where the accident occurred.

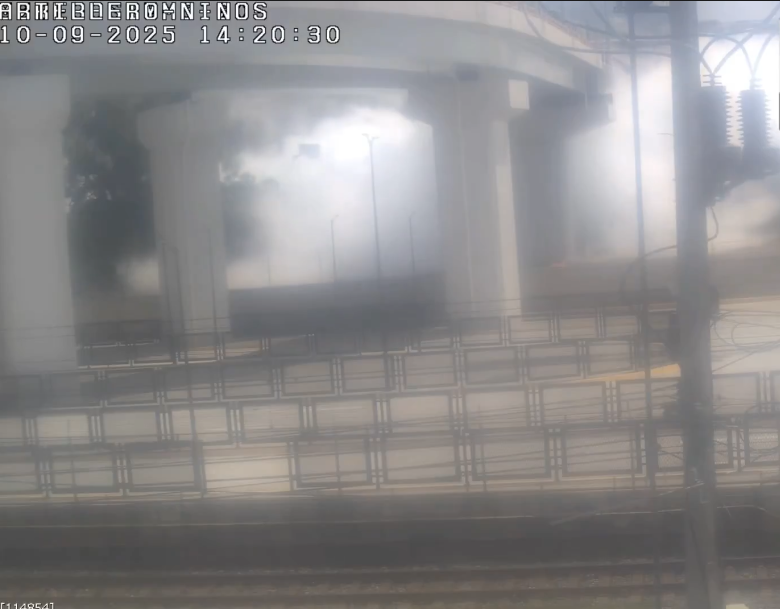
A cloud of gas quickly spreads in the area. Here it is seen at 14:20:30.

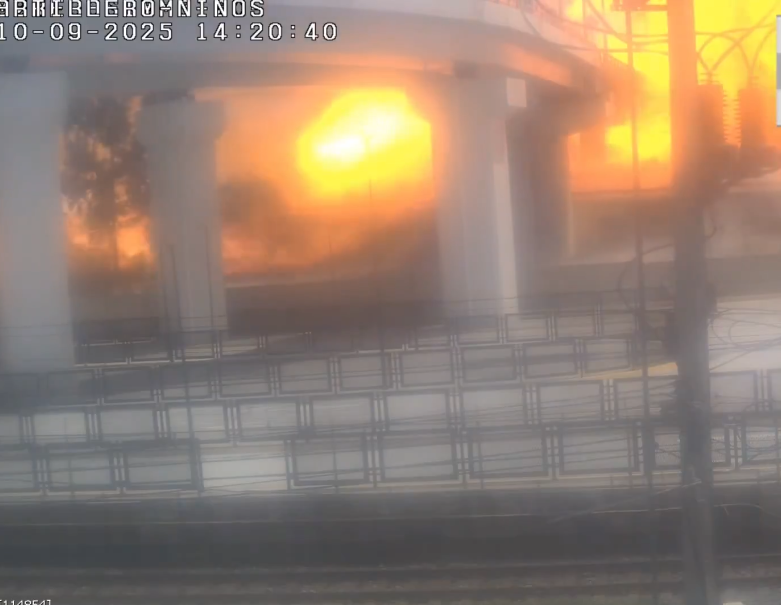
An unknown heat source ignites the gas cloud. This explosion is seen at 14:20:40.

The tanker loaded at a terminal of the Tomza conglomerate located in Tuxpan, Veracruz. At 2:20 p.m., the tanker was traveling on the La Concordia Highway Interchange when it was recorded by C5 video surveillance cameras. Three seconds later, the vehicle overturned on a curve and began to release gas. The LPG, upon coming into contact with ambient pressure, expanded rapidly. Due to its density, greater than that of air, it remained at low height, accumulating near the ground, although some currents partially raised it. Many people immediately noticed the risk and fled, abandoning vehicles; however, the rapid spread of the gas prevented others from escaping. Even an elevated trolleybus was forced to stop. The driver of the tanker died. The gas cloud was visible from elevated viaducts near the interchange.

=== Explosion ===
Thirty seconds after the gas expanded, a spark ignited an explosion, generating a shock wave audible for several meters around and thermal radiation that affected vehicles and pedestrians even outside the immediate radius of the flames. Among the vehicles hit by the fire was a trolleybus, although it was not seriously damaged. Several cars were consumed by the flames and many people suffered burns up to third degree. Some citizens recorded the moment of the explosion from different angles, capturing flames up to 30 meters high. Minutes later, survivors with severe burns were seen wandering around the road interchange looking for help. Several passersby tried to assist the injured by throwing water on them or removing their clothes.

=== Response ===
At 2:27 p.m., the Mexico City Fire Department reported receiving reports of a blaze in the area. By 2:46 p.m., the Ministry of Citizen Security confirmed the dispatch of four ambulances from the Rescue and Emergency Medical Squad (ERUM) and a specialized rescue unit. The Mexico City Metro, RTP, Cablebús and trolleybus service was suspended at nearby stations and the road was completely closed. At 3:08 p.m., the first fire trucks and ambulances began to arrive. Local residents attempted to help firefighters with buckets of water, despite the risk of further explosions. Twenty minutes later, the Ministry of Health reported that various emergency services were already treating the injured. However, from the first moments police officers transported the injured in patrol cars to nearby hospitals, among the victims was a baby who was traveling on a bus with her grandmother. The baby suffered severe burns and the grandmother died two days later. (Note: Although initially false news about her death was spread, her relatives denied it. Hours later the Ministry of Health of Mexico City confirmed the news about her death was a mistake, and later apologized saying that she was still alive, but in serious condition. Although some time later her death was reported.)

At 3:40 PM, the head of the Secretariat for Comprehensive Risk Management and Civil Protection, Myriam Urzúa, and the Secretary of Citizen Security, Pablo Vázquez, arrived at the scene. Minutes later, the head of Government, Clara Brugada, arrived. By 4:57 PM, the tanker still contained 30% flammable material. At that time, seven hospitals had been set up to receive the injured, some of whom were transported by helicopter. The fire chief reported that at 5:35 PM the fire was extinguished in the unit, and at 6:26 PM there was no more gas left inside. At 8:09 PM, the tanker began to be removed.

== Aftermath ==
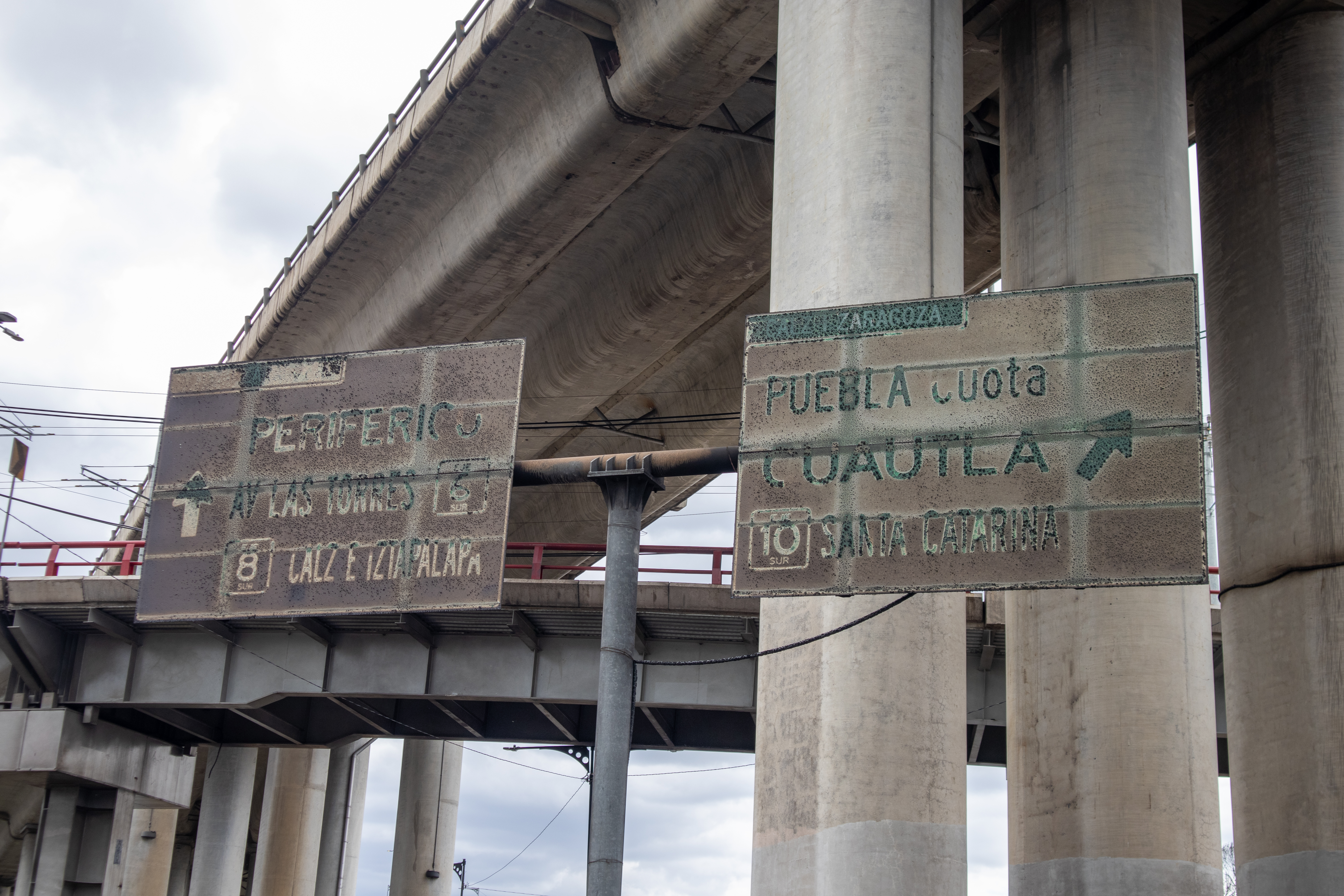
Burned signs near the interchange as a result of the explosion.

31 people were killed and over 90 others were injured in the explosion. Traffic was closed at the interchange for rescue operations, as this it is the main route between Mexico City, the eastern part of Mexico and the state of Puebla. Among the victims was a 19-year-old student from the National Autonomous University of Mexico who was initially reported missing. Her body was later discovered unrecognizable, only being identified through DNA studies. Other victims included two staff members from the Instituto Politécnico Nacional. Personal belongings were also found at the scene. At least 120 firefighters from Mexico City and the State of Mexico participated in controlling the fire. Brugada supervised the rescue efforts and smoke control. For several hours, firefighters and some neighbors threw water on the crashed vehicle to cool it and allow its contents to be emptied.

Emergency services transported the affected people to nearby hospitals, mostly ISSSTE's José María Morelos y Pavón General Hospital, and IMSS's General Hospital of Zone 53. People who were in the vicinity of the disaster helped with the rescue efforts, as well as putting out the flames of vehicles and trees by carrying buckets of water from nearby houses and throwing dirt with objects on what was consumed by the fire. Neighbors of nearby houses helped to shelter people in need of assistance. Outside the hospitals, people gathered to assist with food and donations to the families of the victims. The mayor of Iztapalapa, Aleida Alavez Ruiz, arrived at the scene at 4:00 p.m.

Likewise, public transportation services were suspended, including the Metro, Trolleybus and Cablebus, as well as the temporary modification of RTP routes 52 and 1D, to facilitate the access of authorities to the area of the accident and carry out the corresponding damage control. Animals were rescued. Personnel from the Mexico City Human Rights Commission went to the scene and to the hospitals to collaborate with the victims. Collection centers were enabled for those affected by the accident.

A Yutong Mexico City Trolleybus Line 10 elevated trolleybus with bus number 24014 was damaged by the blast, however, the operator and passengers traveling on the vehicle at the time were able to overcome the danger, as the vehicle was able to withstand the heat generated by the explosion, and the operator's skill enabled the passengers to safely return to the terminal.

At 7:00 p.m., Clara Brugada held a press conference at the scene to provide an initial assessment. The vehicle responsible for the explosion was removed by midnight of September 11th.

== Investigation ==
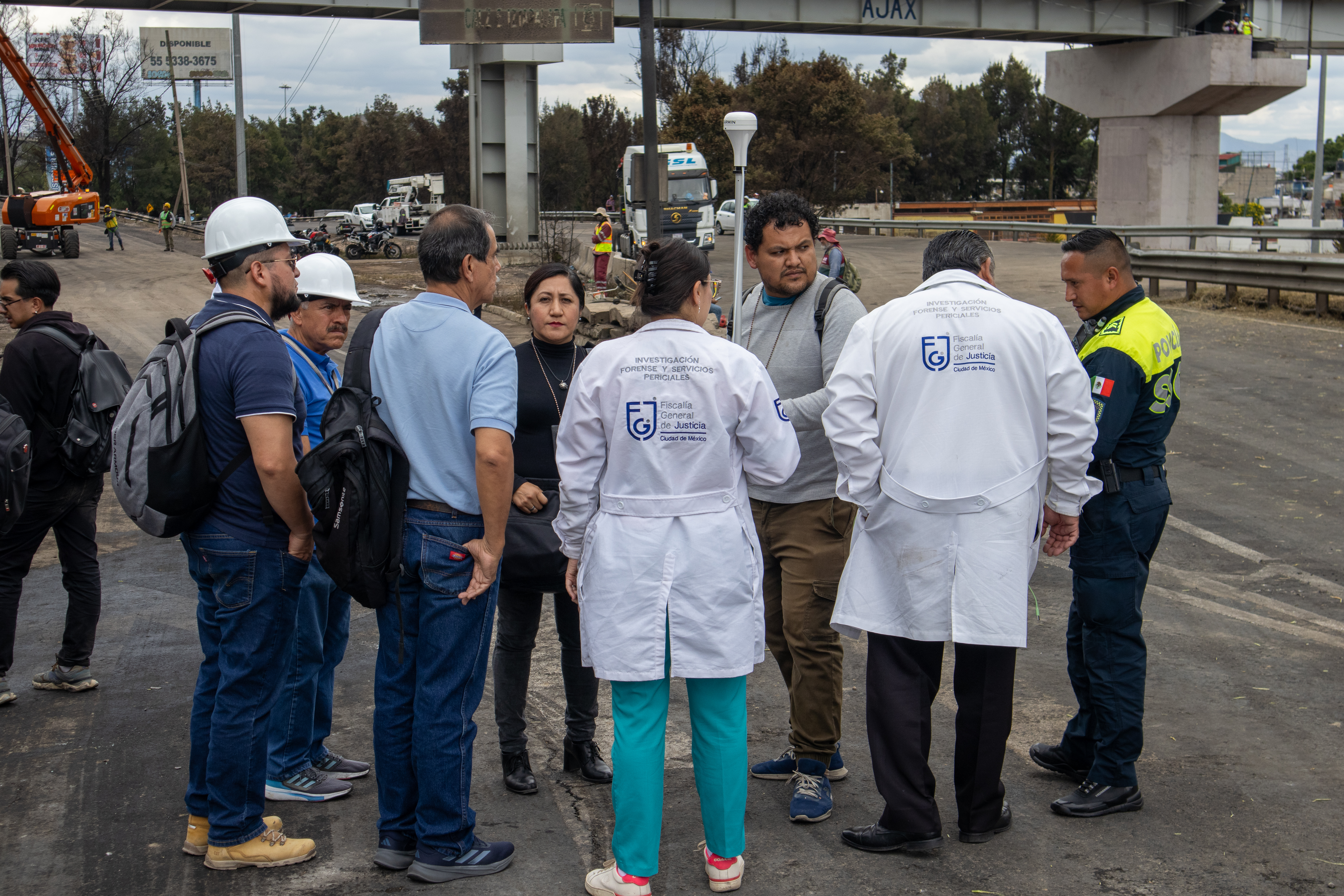
Investigators working at the scene.

Experts from the Mexico City Attorney General's Office began gathering evidence with specialized personnel in various areas such as forensics, chemistry, and road safety, among others. They were assisted by personnel from the National Agency for Industrial Safety and Environmental Protection in the Hydrocarbon Sector (ASEA). Preliminary information revealed that the insurance provided by this agency to load fuel at the Tuxpan plant had expired.

At a press conference on September 11th, Prosecutor Bertha Alcalde reported that preliminary investigations had yielded evidence of alleged excessive speed in the driving of the damaged tanker.

== Reactions ==
- Mexican President Claudia Sheinbaum expressed her condolences for the explosion on X and ordered prompt attention to the victims. The following day, Sheinbaum reiterated her condolences and support for the victims.
- The FES Zaragoza of the UNAM decided to suspend face-to-face classes.
- Company Silza published a statement expressing its regret and taking responsibility for the explosion and confirming that they have insurance to deal with the situation.
- On 30 September 2025, Clara Brugrada announced that no more than 40,000 liters of toxic material could be transported. The speed limit would be 30 km/h and such transports would only be allowed to circulate between 10:00 pm and 5:00 am.
