= 2025 Irapuato shooting =

2025 mass shooting in Irapuato, Mexico

- Location: Irapuato, Guanajuato, Mexico
- Date: 24 June 2025; 16 months ago
- Target: Festival-goers
- Attack type: Mass shooting
- Deaths: 12
- Injuries: 20

On 24 June 2025, twelve people were killed and twenty others were injured during a mass shooting when gunmen opened fire on revelers at a festival celebrating the Nativity of John the Baptist in Irapuato, Guanajuato, Mexico.

== Background ==
Guanajuato has notoriously become renowned as Mexico's most violent state in recent years. Authorities blame much of the violence on an ongoing turf war between the Santa Rosa de Lima Cartel and the Jalisco New Generation Cartel. Government figures show Guanajuato recorded more than 3,000 homicides last year, the highest in the country and 1,435 homicides in the state through the first five months of the year, more than double any other state. A month before the shooting, investigators said they found seventeen bodies in an abandoned house in Guanajuato. Just days before that, seven people were killed, including children, in a shooting by the Santa Rosa de Lima Cartel targeting a party organized by the Catholic Church in San Felipe.

== Shooting ==
Gunmen opened fire on revelers that were drinking and dancing in the street at night while celebrating festivities at a house after a confrontation between unnamed parties. The gunfire caused panic, making people scream and run away from the shooting. Bloodstains on the ground and bullet holes in the walls were seen. People put wounded victims into their cars and rushed them to hospitals.

== Victims ==
Following the shooting, Irapuato's Civil Security Office stated "According to preliminary data, 10 people lost their lives and several more were injured by firearm projectiles". Irapuato official Rodolfo Gómez Cervantes later confirmed in a news conference on 25 June that the death toll was twelve. Among the victims were a 17-year-old, eight men and two women.

== Reactions ==
President Claudia Sheinbaum lamented the attack, saying that it was under investigation.

The local government called the attack a "cowardly act" and said security forces are searching for the perpetrators. Psychological support is being offered to affected families. Guanajuato Governor Libia García Muñoz Ledo also denounced the attack, offering condolences to the families of the victims and pledging justice.

== See also ==
- Crime in Mexico
