= Waldo's =

Mexican discount stores company

Official logo

Waldo's (officially Waldo's Dólar Mart de México S. de R.L. de C.V., Waldo's L.L.C.) is a privately held company, the biggest Mexican one dollar store, operating three chains of retail stores. The namesake chain Waldo's consists of more than 890 discount stores across Mexico as of May 2025, with a merchandise selection similar to that of a dollar store in the United States, although without focusing on a specific single price point (or multiple thereof). Most products are priced between 9.99 and 99.99 pesos, about US$0.52 to US$5.19 as of June 10, 2025.

Other chains are Eleczión for clothing with 200 stores (Dec. 2023), and Waldo's Motos carrying motorcycles.

== Main headquarters ==
The company headquarters are based in Mexico City.

== History ==
In 1999, Waldo's opened four stores in Tijuana, a large city along the border on the U.S. border next to San Diego, using the U.S. dollar store model.

From four stores in Baja California by 2005, it had grown to 147 stores in 21 of the 31 Mexican states. In 2022, Waldo's opened its 500th store in Mexico.

In May 2023, the company announced that:

- it had grown by 45% in the three years up until then
- its goal of growing from 800 to 1000 stores "soon" with an investment of 2 billion pesos (about US$115 million)
- its opinion that the Mexican market could eventually support up to 5000 Waldo's stores

=== 2025 fire in Hermosillo, Sonora ===
On November 1, 2025, a deadly fire broke out at a Waldo’s store in downtown Hermosillo, Sonora, Mexico. The incident resulted in 23 deaths and 12 injuries. According to the Sonora State Prosecutor’s Office, the fire was likely caused by a faulty transformer, and the store had been operating without an approved civil protection plan since 2021.

The victims included children, elderly customers, and store employees. The tragedy prompted the temporary closure of all 68 Waldo’s locations in Sonora for safety inspections.

Sonora’s Attorney General, Gustavo Salas, announced that municipal, state, and federal officials responsible for oversight would be summoned for investigation.

A memorial altar was placed around the incident ground zero by local residents, and the city cancelled public Day of the Dead celebrations in mourning.

== Product categories ==
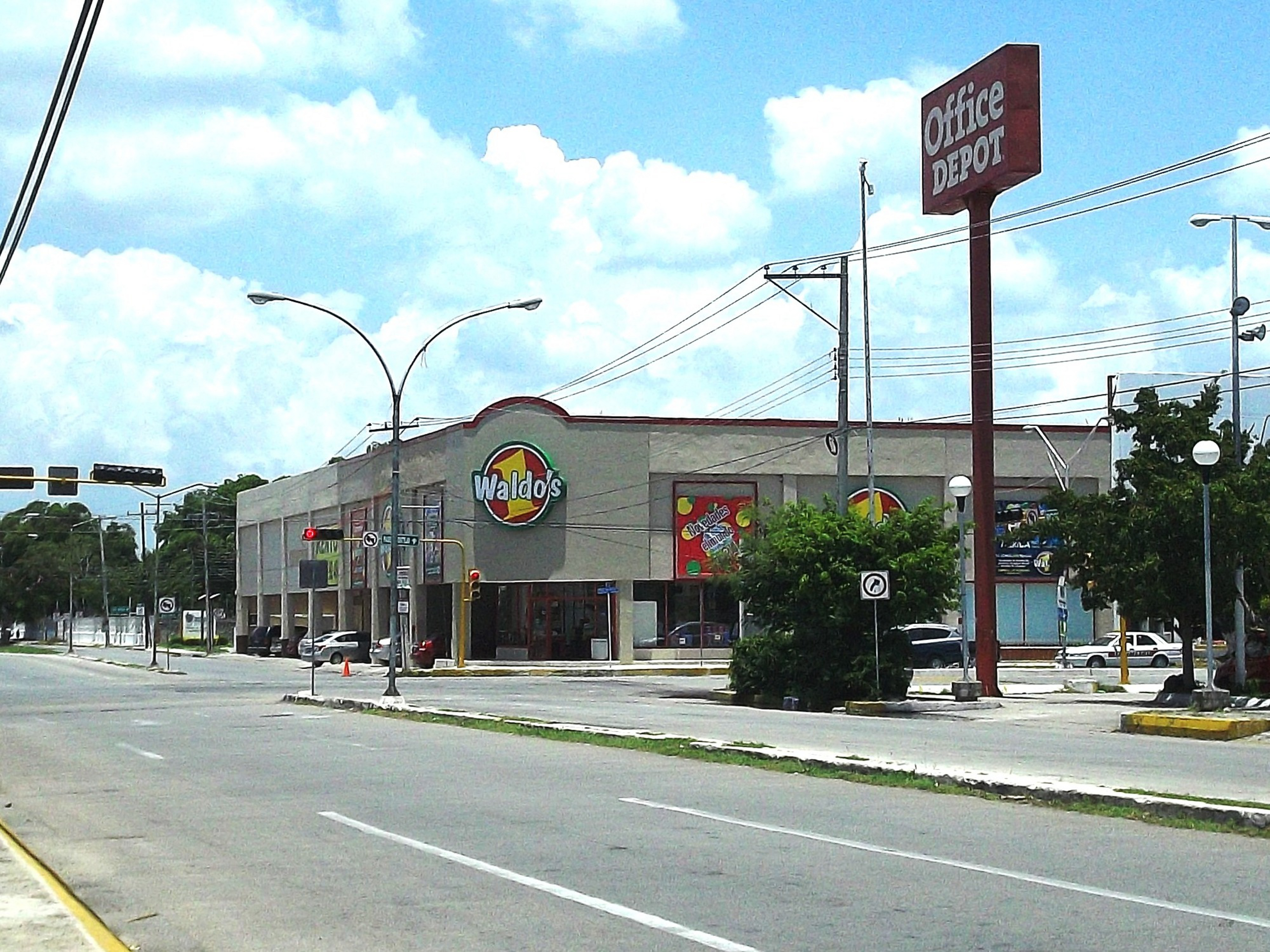
A Waldo's store in Mérida, Yucatán state

Products carried are similar to dollar stores in the U.S.:

- Homeware for kitchen, bathroom, bedroom
- Home decor, home organization, furniture, bed and bath linens
- Groceries, everyday dry goods incl. personal care products
- Cleaning supplies, pet supplies
- Hardware and tools, auto supplies, camping supplies
- Suitcases and travel bags
- Small electronics, televisions, small appliances
- Major appliances (small selection)
- Apparel, wearing accessories, footwear, jewelry, watches, sunglasses
- Toys, bicycles, games, party supplies

Since 2022, Waldo's also has separate stores branded Waldo's Motos selling motorcycles, thus competing with top retailer Elektra.

== E-commerce ==
Waldo's acknowledged in a 2023 interview that its entry into e-commerce in late 2020 was "very late". It offers online sales via its website waldos.com.mx and also has a mobile app. As of 2023, the company states that it has about 12,000 e-commerce transactions a month, increasing to about 20,000 a month nearer the year-end holidays, and that the average e-commerce transaction is about six times larger than in-store transactions. Its e-commerce product range is wider than in stores, with a much wider selection of products especially in certain categories such as small and large appliances, travel-related products, homewares, home decor and special offers.

== Financial services ==
Waldo's offers both a credit card, as well as international money transfers to Mexico with cash pickup at Waldo's stores, and runs the foundation Corazones con Vizión.

== Facilities ==
Waldo's has distribution centers in Lerma, Guadalajara, and Tijuana. The retailer had about 9,000 direct employees as of May 2023.

== Key people ==
- Ernesto Llano, Commercial Director
- Juan Manuel Altamirano, Director of Growth
- Luis Massieu, Director of Finance

== Geographic distribution ==
According to the Waldo's website in December 2023, stores are distributed as follows across the 32 federal entities (31 states plus Mexico City):

State/Federal Entity	Eleczion stores	Waldos stores	Grand Total
Baja California	7	59	66
Tamaulipas	9	42	51
Coahuila	11	39	50
Nuevo León	5	42	47
Chihuahua	12	34	46
Jalisco	11	33	44
Veracruz	18	22	40
Sonora	11	29	40
State of Mexico	7	27	34
Guanajuato	9	23	32
Sinaloa	8	20	28
Michoacán	12	16	28
Baja California Sur	5	20	25
Quintana Roo	6	16	22
Tabasco	10	11	21
Mexico City	0	21	21
Chiapas	14	4	18
Yucatán	5	9	14
Puebla	9	5	14
Guerrero	4	10	14
Durango	0	13	13
San Luis Potosí	6	5	11
Morelos	2	8	10
Zacatecas	2	7	9
Hidalgo	3	6	9
Colima	0	8	8
Querétaro	1	6	7
Oaxaca	4	3	7
Aguascalientes	2	5	7
Nayarit	3	3	6
Campeche	3	2	5
Tlaxcala	1	1	2
Grand Total	200	549	749
