= 2023 in Mexico =

- Decades: 2000s; 2010s; 2020s
- See also: History of Mexico; List of years in Mexico; Timeline of Mexican history

This article lists events occurring in Mexico during 2023. It lists the most important political leaders during the year at both federal and state levels and will include a brief year-end summary of major social and economic issues. Cultural events, including major sporting events, are also listed.

== Incumbents ==
=== President and cabinet ===
- President: Andrés Manuel López Obrador MORENA
- Interior: Olga Sánchez Cordero
- Foreign Affairs: Marcelo Ebrard
- Treasury: Arturo Herrera
- Economy: Tatiana Clouthier Carrillo
- Environment: Maria Luisa Albores
- Tourism: Miguel Torruco Marqués
- Civil Service: Irma Sandoval-Ballesteros
- Health: Jorge Alcocer Varela
- Development: Román Meyer Falcón
- Welfare: Javier May Rodríguez
- Culture: Alejandra Frausto Guerrero
- Defense: Luis Cresencio Sandoval
- Navy: José Rafael Ojeda Durán
- Security: Alfonso Durazo Montaño
- Attorney General: Alejandro Gertz Manero

=== Supreme Court ===
- President of the Supreme Court: Arturo Zaldívar Lelo de Larrea

=== LXV Legislature ===
==== President of the Senate ====
- Olga Sánchez Cordero MORENA

==== President of the Chamber of Deputies ====
- Sergio Gutiérrez Luna MORENA

== Events ==
=== January ===
- 1 January - 2023 Ciudad Juárez prison attack: Ten prison officers and four to seven inmates are killed in an armed attack on a prison in Ciudad Juárez, Chihuahua, in which 24-30 prisoners escaped.
- 3 January - Five gunmen and two security force members are killed during a gun battle while searching for 30 inmates who escaped two days ago during the Juárez prison attack.
- 5 January - 2023 Sinaloa unrest: The army arrests Ovidio Guzmán López, the son of incarcerated drug lord Joaquín "El Chapo" Guzmán, in Culiacán, Sinaloa. Unrest ensues in the state, with schools and airports closed. Ten soldiers, a police officer and 19 cartel members are killed.
- 7 January - 2023 Mexico City Metro train crash: One person is killed and dozens of others are injured when two trains crash on Line 3 of the Mexico City Metro in Mexico City.

=== February ===
- 19 February - Senate by-election in Tamaulipas
- 28 February - Nuevo Laredo military shooting: Soldiers open fire on a pickup truck carrying unarmed civilians in Nuevo Laredo, Tamaulipas, killing five people, sparking protests and riots by local people.

=== March ===
- 13 March - Secondary student Norma Lizbeth Ramos died weeks after being beaten by her bully and classmate Azahara Martínez. Ramos was hit multiple times with a rock in the face and head by Martínez. The event was recorded and the video went viral due to violence, school bullying and discrimination in the event.
- 28 March - Ciudad Juárez migrant center fire: Central and South American detainees at a migrant center in Ciudad Juárez deliberately set fire to their mattresses, killing 38 people and injuring 28 others.

=== April ===
- 1 April - Two people are killed and another is injured when a hot air balloon catches fire near Teotihuacan, State of Mexico.
- 18 April - President Andrés Manuel López Obrador accuses the United States Department of Defense of spying and says that he will classify information from the Mexican Armed Forces.

=== May ===
- 2023 Mexico Meningitis outbreak: Health authorities urged the World Health Organization (WHO) to issue a warning about a meningitis outbreak linked to two cosmetic surgery clinics in Matamoros, Tamaulipas.

=== June ===
- 12 June - Foreign Minister Marcelo Ebrard resigns and announces he will run for president of Mexico in the 2024 elections. The Head of Government of Mexico City, Claudia Sheinbaum, also announces that she will resign on 16 June to focus on running for president.

=== July ===
- 5 July - A bus plunges into a ravine near Magdalena Peñasco, Oaxaca, killing 27 people and injuring 17 others.

=== September ===
- 16 September - Ovidio Guzmán López, the son of Joaquín "El Chapo" Guzmán, is extradited to the United States from Mexico on drug trafficking and money laundering charges.
- 27 September - Authorities in Nuevo León find at least twelve bodies dumped on roads in the area of Monterrey, likely related to a drug cartel operating in Tamaulipas.
- 28 September - Six teenagers who were kidnapped by a group of armed men a few days ago are found dead near Villanueva, Zacatecas.

=== October ===
- 1 October - At least 10 people are killed, and 60 are injured, at Santa Cruz Church, Ciudad Madero, after the church's roof collapsed during a baptism ceremony.
- 10 October - Hurricane Lidia makes landfall in the state of Jalisco as a Category 4 hurricane on the Saffir-Simpson scale, killing one person.
- 13 October - A military helicopter crashes in Canelas, Durango, killing three people.
- 14 October - Solar eclipse of October 14, 2023: An annular solar eclipse is visible the Western U.S., Mexico, Central America, Colombia, and Brazil and was the 44th solar eclipse of Solar Saros 134.
- 21 October - Hurricane Norma makes landfall near Cabo San Lucas, Baja California Sur. Warnings have been issued for the states of Baja California Sur and Sinaloa.
- 23 October - At least 24 people, including twelve police officers, are killed in three separate mass shootings and ambushes by unidentified assailants in Coyuca de Benítez, Guerrero, and Tacámbaro, Michoacán.
- 25 October - Hurricane Otis makes landfall near Acapulco, Guerrero, as a category 5 hurricane with 1-minute sustained winds of 165 miles per hour (266 km/h).
- 26 October - The Mexican government reports that at least 27 people were killed and four others are missing due to Hurricane Otis's landfall on Acapulco. The government also reports widespread flooding, significant infrastructure damage, and looting in some areas.

=== November ===
- 7 November - The Zapatista Army of National Liberation announces they are dissolving the autonomous municipalities they established after 1994.
- 20 November - A shootout between police and armed civilians in Cuernavaca, Morelos, kills nine people, including two police officers.

=== December ===
- 13 December - Six people are killed and two others are injured in a shootout between rival drug cartels in Zacatecas.
- 15 December - President Andrés Manuel López Obrador inaugurates the first part of the tourist Maya Train, that runs in a rough loop around the Yucatán Peninsula. The US$20 billion, 950-mile line will connect beach resorts and archaeological sites.
- 17 December - Salvatierra massacre: Twelve people are killed during a mass shooting at a Christmas season party in Salvatierra, Guanajuato. Three others are killed and four injured at a bar in Tulum, Quintana Roo, while four are killed in Salamanca, Guanajuato.
- 22 December — Former Ecuadorian vice president Jorge Glas requests asylum.
- 28 December — Gunmen from the La Familia Michoacana drug cartel kidnap 14 people from Texcaltitlán as retaliation for a previous incident in which 10 cartel members were killed by residents of the town.
- 29 December — 2023 Ciudad Obregón shooting: Eight people are killed and 26 others are injured in a mass shooting at a party in Ciudad Obregón, Sonora. The shooting's target, a cartel member, is among those killed.

== Sports ==
Association football

- 2022–23 Liga MX season
- 2022–23 Liga MX Femenil season

== Deaths ==
=== January ===
- 5 January – Ernesto Alfredo Piñón de la Cruz, 33, criminal (Los Mexicles).
- 8 January – Juan Francisco García, 69, Mexican Olympic boxer.
- 10 January – Black Warrior, 54, professional wrestler (CMLL).
- 15 January – Guadalupe Rivera Marín, 98, lawyer and politician
- 16 January – Luisa Josefina Hernández, 94, writer, playwright and translator.
- 18 January – Victor Rasgado, 63, pianist and composer.
- 22 January – Octaviano Juarez-Corro, 49, Mexican-American fugitive (FBI Ten Most Wanted).
- 23 January - Polo Polo, 78, comedian.
- 27 January – Albert Almanza, 86, Olympic basketball player.
- 30 January – Jesús Aguilar Padilla, 70, politician, governor of Sinaloa.

=== February ===
- 2 February - Gerardo Islas Maldonado, 39, businessman and politician, member of the Congress of Puebla.
- 7 February - Fernando Becerril, 78, actor.
- 9 February - Changoleón, c. 82, Mexican television personality.
- 13 February - Jesse Treviño, 76, Mexican-American painter.
- 16 February -
  - Héctor Mario Gómez Galvarriato, 85, engineer, inventor and businessman.
  - Marilú, 95, singer and actress.
- 17 February - Ángela Gurría, 93, sculptor.
- 24 February - Felipe González González, 76, politician.

=== March ===
- 1 March - Irma Serrano, 89, actress.
- 7 March - Salvador Farfán, 90, footballer.
- 11 March - Ignacio López Tarso, 98, actor.
- 17 March
  - Fito Olivares, 75, cumbia musician.
  - Carlos Payán, 94, writer, journalist and politician.
- 22 March - Rebecca Jones, 65, Mexican-American actress (Imperio de cristal, Para volver a amar, Que te perdone Dios).
- 25 March
  - Chabelo, 88, American-born Mexican actor.
  - Lucinda Urrusti, 94, Spanish-born Mexican artist.

=== April ===
- 2 April - Raúl Padilla López, 68, academic.
- 4 April - Andrés García, 81, Dominican-Mexican actor.
- 18 April - Pablo González Casanova, 101, lawyer, sociologist, and historian.
- 22 April - Marcela González Salas, 75, politician.
- 24 April - Alfredo Arreguín, 88, Mexican-American painter.

=== May ===
- 9 May - Antonio Carbajal, 93, football player (León, national team) and manager (Atlético Morelia).
- 20 May - Luis Walton, 73, politician, senator (2006–2012) and municipal president of Acapulco (2012–2015).
- 23 May - Javier Álvarez, 67, composer.
- 31 May - Sergio Calderón, 77, Mexican-born American actor (Pirates of the Caribbean: At World's End, Men in Black, The Ruins).

=== June ===
- 4 June - Dora María, 89, folk singer.
- 7 June - Leonardo Nierman, 90, artist.
- 8 June - Carlos Sada, 70, politician and diplomat, ambassador to the United States (2016–2017).
- 18 June - Rosario Zúñiga, 59, Mexican actress (Salvador).
- 20 June -
  - Rogelio Esquivel Medina, 83, Roman Catholic prelate, auxiliary bishop of México (2001–2008).
  - Rosalía Peredo, 71, politician and social activist, deputy (1985–1988) and senator (2006–2012).
- 27 June - Joana Brito, 76, actress (Teresa, La fuerza del destino) and voiceover artist (The Princess and the Frog).
- 28 June - Talina Fernández, 78, television presenter and actress (Muchachita, Tenías que ser tú).
- 29 June - Hipólito Mora, 67, farmer and politician.

=== July ===
- 1 July - Francisco Molina Ruiz, 72, lawyer and politician, senator (1997–2000).
- 4 July - Adolfo Gilly, 94, historian.
- 8 July - Gloria Mange, 92, actress (¿Qué te ha dado esa mujer?, If I Were a Congressman, The Unknown Mariachi).
- 9 July - Porfirio Muñoz Ledo, 89, politician, secretary of labor (1972–1975) and public education (1976–1977), twice president of the chamber of deputies.
- 11 July - Jorge Bernal Vargas, 94, Roman Catholic prelate, bishop of Cancún-Chetumal (1974–2004).
- 20 July - Juan Meza, 67, boxer, WBC super bantamweight champion (1984–1985).
- 31 July - Roberto Cintli Rodríguez, 69, Mexican-American columnist, author, and academic (Mexican American studies).

=== August ===
- 17 August - David Ostrosky, 66, actor (Teresa, Marisol, Por siempre mi amor).
- 24 August - Ignacio Solares, 78, writer.
- 30 August - Montserrat Galí Boadella, 76, art historian.

=== September ===
- 11 September - Benito Castro, 77, musician, comedian (Los Hermanos Castro) and actor (Como dice el dicho).
- 16 September - Tulio Hernández Gómez, 85, politician, two-term deputy, borough chief of Azcapotzalco (1976–1979) and governor of Tlaxcala (1981–1987).
- 21 September - Ignacio Vázquez Torres, 84, politician, three-term deputy, borough chief of Cuauhtémoc (1988–1990) and senator (1994–2000).
- 23 September - Eugenio Elorduy Walther, 82, politician, governor of Baja California (2001–2007).

=== October ===
- 4 October - Héctor Mayagoitia Domínguez, 100, bacteriologist and politician, governor of Durango (1974–1979).
- 15 October - Teófilo Torres Corzo, 77, politician, MP (1985–1988, 2012–2015) and governor of San Luis Potosí (1992–1993).
- 19 October - Carlos Romero Deschamps, 79, politician, MP (1979–1982, 1991–2003, 2012–2015).
- 21 October - Hans Friessen, 74, footballer (Atlas, Guadalajara, Tecos).
- 31 October - Jorge Arturo García Rubí, 75, lawyer and politician, interim governor of Morelos (2000).

=== November ===
- 3 November - Orlando Garibay, 30, racing cyclist (Cylance, Crisa–SEEI).
- 5 November - Enrique Dussel, 88, Argentine-Mexican philosopher, historian and theologian, interim rector of UACM (2013–2014).
- 3 November -
  - Ociel Baena, 38, magistrate and LGBT rights activist.
  - Héctor Benavides, 82, news anchor and radio personality.
  - Abel Ignacio Cuevas Melo, 58, politician, deputy (2000–2003, 2006–2009).
- 23 November - Francisco Luna Kan, 97, politician, governor of Yucatán (1976–1982) and deputy (1964–1967).
- 25 November - Fabio Martínez Castilla, 73, Roman Catholic prelate, bishop of Ciudad Lázaro Cárdenas (2007–2013) and archbishop of Tuxtla (since 2013).
- 30 November - Laura Montalvo, actress (Salomé).

=== December ===
- 2 December - Maria Martin, 72, Mexican-American radio journalist (Latino USA).
- 4 December - Queta Lavat, 94, actress (Las tandas del principal, Cruz de amor, Clase 406).
- 5 December - Juan Pablo Adame, 38, politician, deputy (2012–2015).
- 7 December - Alberto Ruz Buenfil, 78, environmental activist.
- 11 December - Santiago Nieto Sandoval, 88, politician.
- 16 December - Rosita Pelayo, 64, actress (Las amazonas, Salomé, Sortilegio).
- 21 December - Cristina Pacheco, 82, journalist (La Jornada) and television presenter.
- 26 December - Armando Guadiana Tijerina, 77, politician, senator (since 2018).
- 29 December - Rossy Mendoza, 80, vedette, actress (Sweetly You'll Die Through Love), and dancer.
- 31 December - Ana Ofelia Murguía, 90, actress (The Queen of the Night, Nobody Will Speak of Us When We're Dead, Coco).

== See also ==
- Outline of Mexico
- History of Mexico
