= German Mexicans =

Mexican people of German descent

Deutsch-Mexikaner (German) Germano-mexicanos (Spanish)
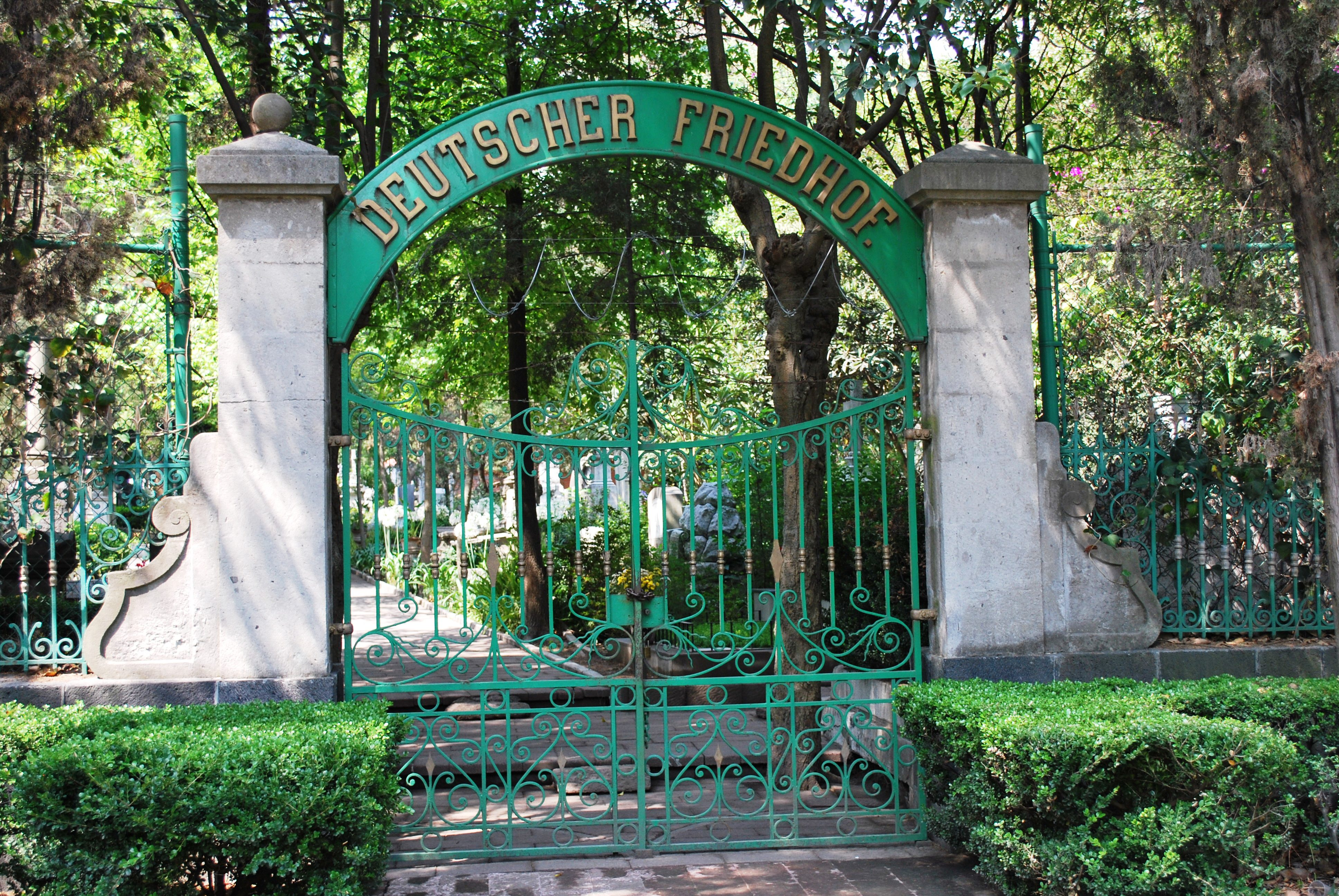
- Entrance to the German section of the Panteón de Dolores in Mexico City

Total population
- Various estimates: 11,398 German nationals residing in Mexico (OECD, 2019).; 15,000-40,000 Mexicans of German descent (Horst Kopp, 2003).; 75,000 including those of partial ancestry Burchard, Gretha (2010).; 100,000 Mennonites from Russia and North America (ABC, 2012).

Regions with significant populations
- Mexico City, northern Mexico, the Soconusco

Languages
- Mexican Spanish, Plautdietsch, Nedderdüütsch, German, Russian, English

Religion
- Roman Catholicism, Protestantism and Judaism

Related ethnic groups
- Other Germans and other German diaspora

German Mexicans are Mexican citizens of German origin. Most documented ethnic Germans arrived in Mexico during the mid-to-late 19th century and were spurred by government policies of Porfirio Díaz. Many of them took advantage of the liberal policies in Mexico at the time and went into merchant, industrial, and educational ventures. However, others arrived with little to no capital as employees or farmers. Most settled in Mexico City and the surrounding states of Puebla and Veracruz as well as the northern states of Sonora, Sinaloa, Jalisco, and Chihuahua. Later settlers headed south towards the Yucatán Peninsula. Significant numbers of German immigrants also arrived during and after both World Wars.

The German influence on modern Mexican culture is visible in their dairy, brewing, and musical entertainment industries with major exports like beer, cheese, and carpentry all deeply rooted in northern German traditions. The most notable German influence on mainstream culture however, is the Northern regional musical sub-genres of tejano, banda, ranchera, and norteño among others. The Plautdietsch language, a dialect of Low German, is widely spoken by the Mexican Mennonites, descendants of Dutch and Prussian immigrants, in the states of Chihuahua, Durango, Zacatecas, and Aguascalientes. Other German towns lie in the Northern and Southern states of Nuevo León, Jalisco, Sinaloa, Yucatán, Chiapas, Quintana Roo, and other parts of Puebla, where the German culture and language have been preserved to different extents.

The German-Mexican community has largely integrated into Mexican society as a whole but has retained some cultural traits and in turn exerted cultural and industrial influences on Mexican society. Especially after First World War, an intense process of transculturation can be observed, particularly in Mexico City, Jalisco, Sinaloa, Nuevo León, Puebla and particularly with the Maya in Chiapas.

== Colonization and immigration ==
The German settlement in Mexico goes back to the times they settled Texas when it was under Spanish rule, but the first permanent settlement of Germans was at Industry, in Austin County, established by Friedrich Ernst and Charles Fordtran in the early 1830s, then under Mexican rule. Ernst wrote a letter to a friend in his native Oldenburg, which was published in the newspaper there. His description of Texas was so influential in attracting German immigrants to that area that he is remembered as "the Father of German Immigration to Texas."

Many Germans, especially Roman Catholics who sided with Mexico, left Texas for the rest of present-day Mexico after the U.S. defeated Mexico in the Mexican–American War in 1848.

In 1865 and 1866, a total of 443 German-speaking people (men, women, and children) were brought from Hamburg specifically to the villages of Santa Elena and Pustunich, in Yucatán. This was a project of foreign colonization promoted during the Second Mexican Empire, and the reign of Emperor Maximilian I of Mexico, with the governing body of the state of Yucatán. The majority of these people were farmers and craftsmen: wheelwrights, shoemakers, cabinet makers, etc.

Other colonies were established in El Mirador, Veracruz by the German botanist Carls Sartorius, and in the state of Tamaulipas by Baron Juan Raiknitz (Johan von Raknitz), in 1833.

Sartorius's settlement, known as The Hacienda, attracted more than 200 settlers from Darmstadt, Germany. The Hacienda was visited many times by Maximilian I, and Sartorius was made the Minister of Agriculture under the Empire.

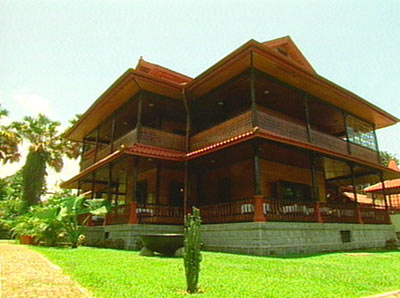
German finca in the Soconusco

In 1890, as part of the blanqueamiento movement, Porfirio Díaz and Otto von Bismarck collaborated to take advantage of southern Mexico's agricultural potential by sending 450 German families to Soconusco near Tapachula in the southern state of Chiapas. Extensive coffee cultivation quickly made Soconusco one of the most successful German colonies, and between 1895 and 1900, 11,500,000 kg of coffee had been harvested. Fincas (estates) were erected in the Chiapaneco highlands and given German names such as Hamburgo, Bremen, Lübeck, Argovia, Bismarck, Prussia, Germania and Hanover.

About 6,000 Russian Mennonites, who came originally from Northern Germany and the Netherlands, migrated from Canada to northern Mexico in the 1920s. Today, there are about 115,000 practicing descendants of Mennonites in Mexico, who have preserved the Plautdietsch dialect and maintained their self-sustaining agricultural and religious practices on their properties. By their community's rules, German Mexican Mennonites are allowed to speak Spanish primarily for the purposes of business, culture, and, on occasion, finding spouses. Several Mennonite colonies have historically been victim to religious fervor, notably during the Christian Civil War. Cult like criticisms persist into the modern day with complaints of “luring and brainwashing the youth,” though these claims remain unsubstantiated with most colonies being mildly isolated and viewed favorably by the Mexican government. The most prosperous Mennonite colonies in Mexico lie in the states of Chihuahua (Cuauhtémoc), Durango (Patos (Nuevo Ideal), Nuevo Hamburgo), Zacatecas (La Honda), Sinaloa, Aguascalientes and Campeche.

Before and after declaring war on the Axis Powers in 1942, port authority began accepting Jewish German refugees as early as 1937 albeit unofficially due to the controversial nature of the Jewish question as well as growing anti-semitism in Caribbean policies. The most notable example being Mexico's reception of German-Jews aboard the St. Louis after the would be immigrants had been refused by Cuban officials in 1939. Government stances on neutrality allotted for inaccurate and skewed registration of war-time arrivals with official documents stating only 18,000 while community and Parish reports cite upwards of 100,000. Contrary to official government reports, the Jewish and Polish-Catholic communities in Mexico cited tens of thousands of new Jewish-German and Polish arrivals between 1937 and 1944. Mexico admitted only 1,850 Jewish refugees between 1933 and 1945, but issued at least 16,000 immigration visas to Spanish loyalist refugees between 1938 and 1945, and over 1,400 visas to Catholic Polish refugees between 1939 and 1941. It is estimated many of these visas were actually used by Jewish German fleeing through Spain in addition to the stowaways smuggled in by seafaring “coyotes." Mexican diplomat Gilberto Bosques Saldivar also played an important role in rescuing German-Jews fleeing through the underground French railroad network. As a consul in Marseilles, a port city in what became Vichy France, Bosques directed consular officials to issue a visa to any refugee who wished to flee to Mexico. His efforts saved the lives of tens of thousands of Jews as well as other refugees fleeing the Franco dictatorship in Spain. Bosques also rented a castle and a summer holiday camp near Marseilles to house refugees, claiming that under international law, the property constituted Mexican territory. In 1943, the Gestapo arrested Bosques, his family, and 40 consular staff and detained them in Germany for a year until the Mexican government obtained their release through a prisoner exchange.

== Cultural legacy ==
Homes in the towns of Nueva Alemania resemble the architectural style of northern Germany, and many of this area's settlers came from the cities of Hamburg, Bremen, and Lübeck. In San Luis Potosí, Sinaloa (Mazatlán) and Veracruz, settlers from Bavaria built structures similar to those found in the Black Forest. The German Cultural Center building in San Luis Potosí is a Bavarian mansion that had been owned by the Baron of Baden-Baden. German immigrants founded the now defunct football club Germania FV helping in large to popularize the sport in the modern Mexican consciousness, similar to the efforts of German immigrants in Brazil and Argentina.

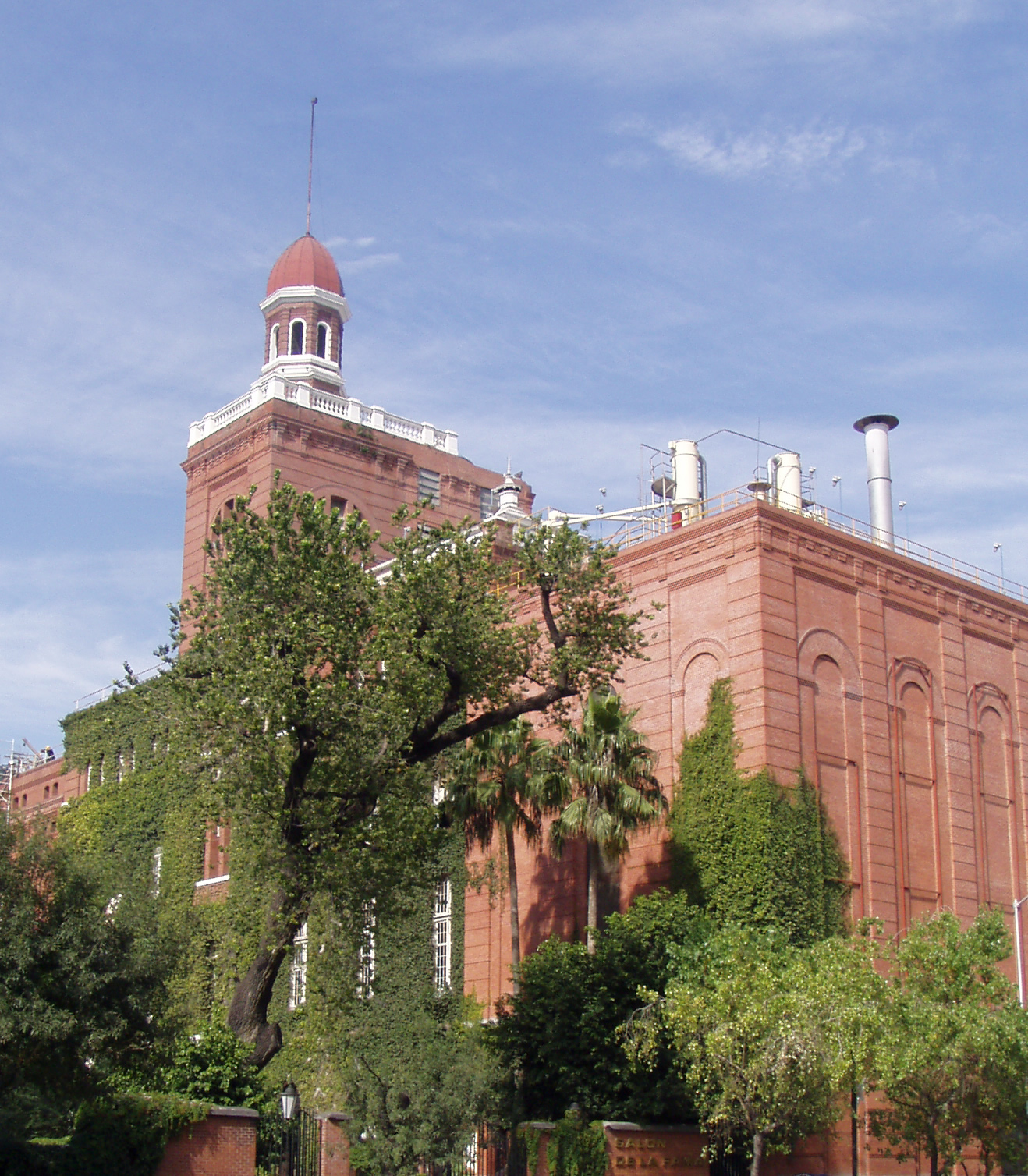
The Cuauhtémoc Moctezuma Brewery in Monterrey was cofounded by Germans.

Oktoberfest is usually held in several large cities with German-Mexican communities throughout the country, mainly in Mexico City, Chihuahua, and Victoria de Durango. German Mexicans were important in the development of the Mexican cheese and brewing industries. The brewing industry, in Monterrey, Nuevo León, and Mazatlán, Sinaloa, were developed in large part by ethnic German immigrants bringing to the region famed Bavarian style dark malt brewing techniques. The influx of German immigrants and the brief Austrian reign (mid-19th century) of Emperor Maximilian, who never traveled anywhere without his two German brew-masters, helped cement the art of brewing as an all-Mexican endeavor felt to this day with Mexico as one of the only Latin American countries where beer consumption trumps that of wine and spirits. German influence has had a lasting impact on Mexican beers, with brands such as Negra Modelo and Dos Equis Ambar, both deriving from a malty subset of dark lagers known as Vienna-style. Beer production remains as one of Mexico's chief industries and biggest exports valued at over a billion USD.

The German-Mexican population is especially prevalent in southern Mexico, particularly the states of Chiapas, Yucatán, and Quintana Roo, where German farmers and industrialists were encouraged to immigrate in the late 1890s. Following collaboration between Otto Von Bismarck and Porfirio Díaz to German colonies were established to develop modern coffee plantations and food processing facilities in the state. German-Mexicans make up a large minority of the population of the soconusco region of Chiapas, where the German population has intermixed with the Maya who make up the majority of the region's population. A study by the Autonomous University of Mexico (UNAM) found that in the municipality of Tapachula and the surrounding Soconusco region that the mixed Mestizo population had a larger concentration of German heritage than Spanish heritage with as many as 160,000 residents cited as being unaware of their German heritage. Many of the original German farms and facilities continue to operate as both ejidos and private ventures.

Surnames of German origin can be commonly found in the Yucatán Peninsula as well as regions of Northern Mexico such as Sonora, Sinaloa, Chihuahua, Nayarit, and Jalisco. Hispanicized spellings of German surnames also exist in large part due to assimilation campaigns from the 19th century. Changing of names among German Jews is also a historic method of negating antisemitism as was the case with Jewish-German immigration waves during both colonial times and World War II. For examples, the German surname “Sols” became the surname “Solis” and “Bergmann” became “Burgos” or “Beltran.” Colonial practices of hispanicizing surnames also occurred albeit with less commitment to translation with many clergymen and Immigration officials simply naming people after identifiable markers resulting in names such as “Aleman," “Rubio,” “Luterano,” “Vismarca,” “Brucha,” “Fridaburgo,” etc. However, traditional German names still exist in certain regions with historic significant populations, such as in the Yucatán, where the 56th and 82nd most common surnames recorded were “Quelle” and “Fiege” according to a 2012 survey of the region.

German influence on media is prominent in its effects on modern culture in areas such as the arts, philosophy, politics, and entertainment. The most notable artist of German descent being Frida Kahlo among others.

== Demography and ancestry ==
There are currently 11,398 registered German nationals residing in Mexico as of 2019. The German embassy in Mexico estimates that there are a further 75,000 Mexicans of German ancestry today. Regardless, Mexico remains the country with the fourth largest German population in Latin America behind only Brazil, Argentina and Chile.

== Education and language ==
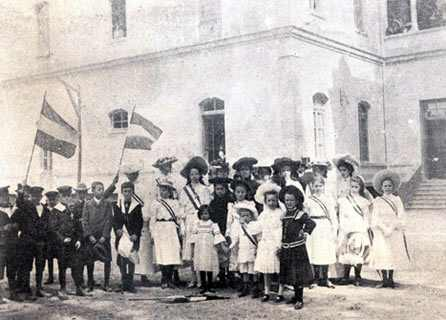
Students of the Colegio Alemán Alexander von Humboldt in the early 20th century.

German as a language of study remains incredibly popular in Mexico with German inching just behind French as the second most commonly studied foreign language. As a major of baccalaureate studies, "Estudios de Ingles y Aleman” or "English & German Studies” often ranks within the top 10 most common majors annually among educational institutions in Mexico. Historic trends of German immigration to Northwestern Mexico reflect modern language revival programs with secondary education institutions in the states of Sinaloa, Sonora, Chihuahua, Durango, Nayarit, Jalisco, and Baja California Sur all investing in community efforts to restore German ethnic ties. Much of this work is to the chagrin of Indigenous activists from Mexico City and Southern Mexico who have been vocal in the disproportionate funding of Euro-centric revival programs.

Following the successful “mestizaje” propaganda efforts by the Institutional Revolutionary Party at the turn of the 20th century, European immigrants were encouraged to assimilate into society and disavow their cultural heritages in favor of the new national identity. As a result, documented Mexicans of German heritage can rarely speak German with most German speaking immigrants opting only to speak in Spanish both at home and to their children. However, in the 21st century, German is seeing positive trends of language revitalization with recent calls from the Mexican-German communities to rebuild once lost cultural ties. Along with the advent of DNA services, this communal effort is seen as a part of the greater movement spearheaded by younger Mexicans to reject traditional nationalist identity politics in favor of their ancestral claims.

Regardless, the nation currently holds the 2nd most German schools in Latin America behind Brazil. Mexico currently has over 3,000 publicly administered German language schools not including international or private institutions. The most notable are as follows:

The Colegio Alemán Cuauhtémoc Hank established in 1993, is a German international school in Colonia Hipódromo, Tijuana. The establishment of the school caused controversy with local outcry from the Chinese-Mexican communities of Tijuana who have been historically negated by the federal education system in their bids to establish Chinese language schools despite documented Chinese-Mexicans outnumbering documented German-Mexicans at roughly 216,000 to 60,000 at the time of the Tijuana 1992 census.

The Colegio Alemán Alexander von Humboldt in Mexico City, established in 1894, is the largest German school outside Germany with about 12,000 enrolled students as of 2012. Enrolled students must prove fluency in standard German unless beginning Kindergarten or transferring into first grade. The school attracts enrolled children of many celebrities and politicians.

The Colegio Humboldt Puebla was first established with 10 primary students and a German teacher in 1911 as a community effort to keep German speaking traditions alive. The school is now a German international school in Cuautlancingo, Puebla, in Greater Puebla.

The Colegio Alemán de Guadalajara, is a German international school in Guadalajara, Jalisco. The school remains as the North American institution with the most German speaking international students from collective countries such as Germany, Switzerland, and Austria.

A small German school was founded in 1917 in Guadalajara as a branch of the Humboldt school. They included in their best kindergarten and elementary school and counted 120 students who were taught by twelve teachers. Mexico's entry into the war in 1942 marked the end of the first German school in Guadalajara. By 1979, the school was re-established in the Mexican education system under fully involved administrative supervision by the board of education. Before that the German language was only taught as a foreign language in addition to the official Mexican teaching program but is now the main language of instruction. The Humboldt program remains the biggest German K-12 schooling system in the Americas, with each campus graduating an average of 3,000 certified bilingual students annually. Colegio Alemán Alexander von Humboldt alone boasts over 156,000 certified fluent graduates since 2000.

== Notable people ==
Notable individuals of German-Mexican descent

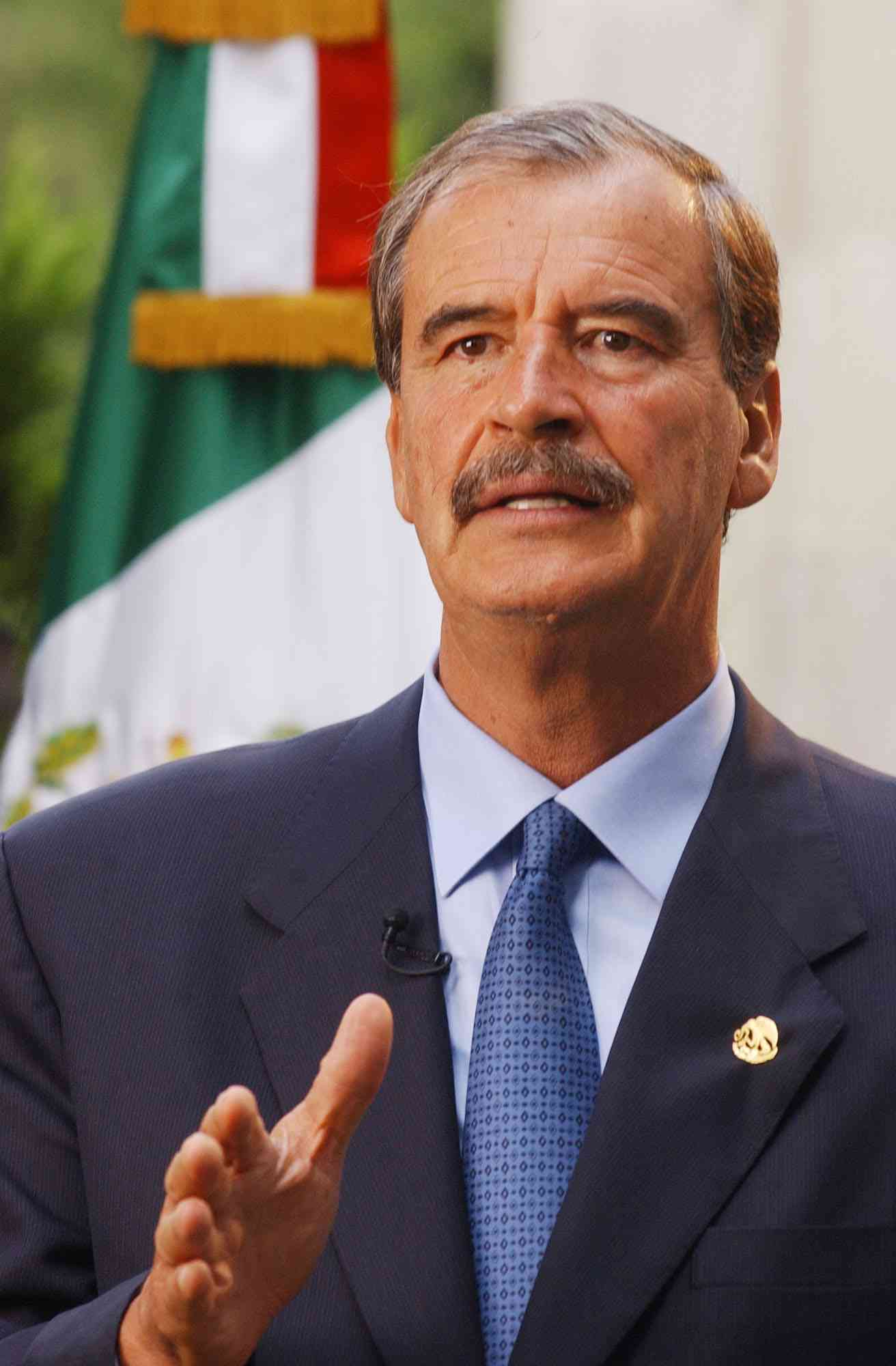
Vicente Fox, 62nd President of Mexico

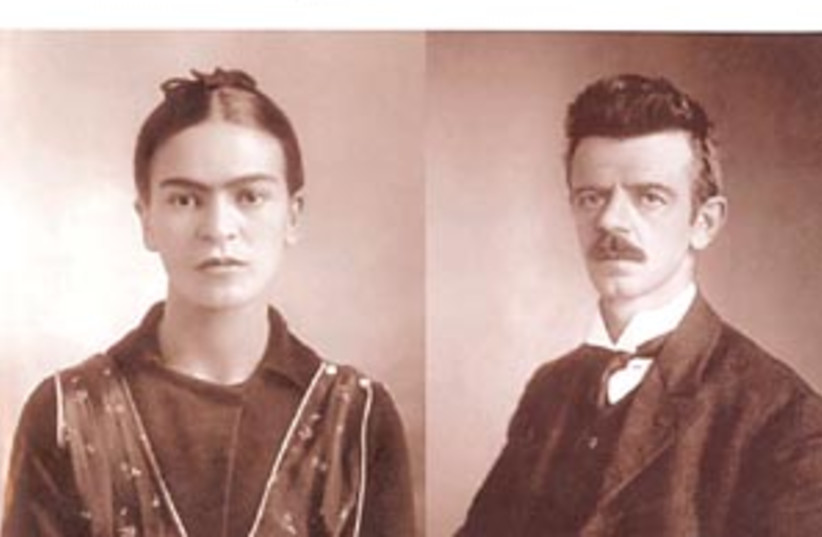
Frida Kahlo, prominent painter and political activist, and her father Guillermo Kahlo (born Carl Wilhelm Kahlo), a German immigrant.

First generation immigrants

- Brigitte Alexander - actress, director, translator
- Fritz Bieler - aviator
- Hugo Brehme - photographer of the Mexican Revolution
- Brigitte Broch - production designer
- Max Cetto - architect
- Olga Costa - painter
- Christa Cowrie - photographer
- Heinz Dieterich - sociologist, political analyst
- Margit Frenk - philologist, folklorist, translator
- Mariana Frenk-Westheim - writer, Hispanist
- Mathias Goeritz - painter, sculptor
- Hans Gutmann Guste - photographer
- Wilhelm Hasse - brewer, founder of Dos Equis
- Guillermo Kahlo - photographer
- Paul Kirchhoff - anthropologist
- Hilde Krüger - actress
- Teoberto Maler - explorer of Maya ruins
- Horst Matthai Quelle - philosopher
- Franz Mayer - financier, photographer, collector, founder of the Franz Mayer Museum
- Sabine Moussier - actress
- Walter Reuter - photojournalist
- Otto Rühle - Communist, writer
- Christian Julius Wilhelm Schiede - physician, botanist
- Otto Schüssler - Communist, political activist
- J. Michael Seyfert - filmmaker, photographer
- Rodolfo Stavenhagen - sociologist
- Martin Tritschler - clockmaker, Captain during the Mexican–American War
- Maximilian Uhland - Catholic missionary
- Fernando Wagner - actor, director

Second generation

- Alexander Afif - businessman, head of the House of Saxony
- Susana Alexander - actress, director, producer
- Hans Beimler - screenwriter
- Arap Bethke - actor
- Enrique Bostelmann - photographer
- Tomás Boy, footballer and manager
- Vicente Fox - 55th President of Mexico, is of German descent from his father, Jose
- Pedro Friedeberg - artist, designer
- Hans Friessen - footballer
- Gunther Gerzso - painter, director
- Memo Gidley - racing driver
- Prince Hubertus of Hohenlohe-Langenburg - alpine skier, photographer, businessman
- Vanessa Huppenkothen - TV presenter, model
- Frida Kahlo - artist, political activist
- Olivia Molina - singer
- Wolfgang Paalen - Surrealist painter
- Raquel Torres - actress
- Nena von Schlebrügge - fashion model
See also: Category:Mexican people of German descent

== See also ==
- Germany–Mexico relations
- Mennonites in Mexico
- Immigration to Mexico
- Mexicans in Germany
- White Mexicans
