= José M. Bayro Corrochano =

Bolivian sculptor

José Miguel Bayro Corrochano
- Born: José Miguel Bayro Corrochano; 19 March 1960 (age 65); Cochabamba, Bolivia
- Education: Arquitectura por la Universidad Nacional Autónoma de México, Maestría en Artes Visuales-Orientación Pintura por la Academia de San Carlos
- Notable work: La Pareja del Trompo, El Hombre Azul y El cajón del Artesano
- Website: www.josebayro.com

José M. Bayro Corrochano (born 1960) is a plastic artist Bolivian and nationalised Mexican that produces oil paintings, sculptures and engraving. It is known by his monumental works La pareja del Trompo (The Spin-top Couple) and El Hombre Azul (The Blue Man )

His first known monumental work was made and planted in the city of Puebla, in Mexico. El Hombre Azull (2006), is a sculpture that represents a worker concentrated in his daily work, which is standing seeing the fruit of his labor beside a peculiar chair. The sculpture is covered in talavera painted in blue tones, on a bed of white stone.

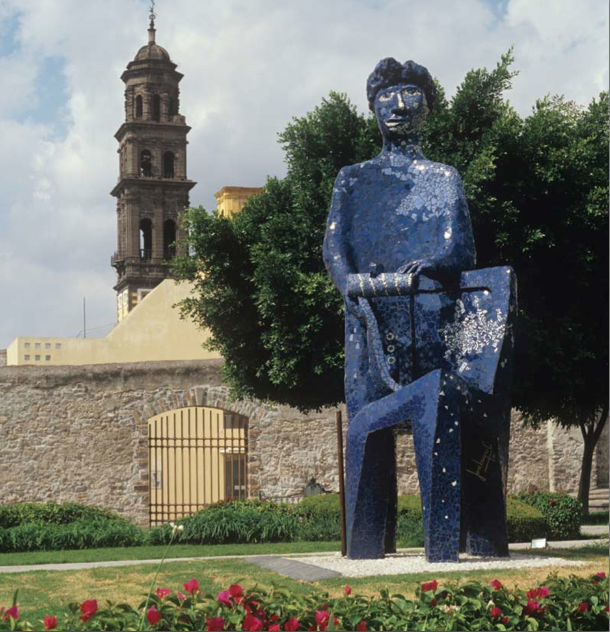
The work “El Hombre Azul” is a sculptural work whose form is a man leaning on a chair, completely covered in Talavera ceramic.

== Biography ==
=== Childhood ===
Bayro Corrochano was born on 19 March 1960 in Cochabamba, Bolivia. With eight brothers and a dictatorship that loomed the future and the education of the young generations, the family Bayro Corrochano encouraged their children to pursue their dreams and vocations. Accordingly, José Bayro C. left to Mexico to study the Degree in Architecture at UNAM (Universidad Nacional Autónoma de México).

=== First period, studies ===
At the age of 18, he left his natal Bolivia to go to study the degree in Architecture in the UNAM (Autonomous National University of Mexico) and the Mastery in Visual arts in the Academy of Saint Carlos. He has taken classes of monumental ceramics, engraving, lithography, serigraph, posproducción of image and sculpture, along wit courses on cultural management, museology, contemporary art and philosophy.

=== Stage second ===
In the last 15 years, Bayro Corrochano has begun to consolidate his artwork, the Study Bayro Corrochando is always showing new works, such as oil-paintings, sculptures or engraving, but also art object and jewellery. "The teacher of the colour" as once called by Carlos Monsiváis, is inspired by men and women´s faces, in Latin American jobs, in the local, the global and the international.

In 2006 planted his first monumental sculpture in the city of Puebla, Mexico. 5 meter high sculpture El Hombre Azul is located in the gardens of The Centro de Convenciones Puebla Willian Or. Jenkins (Centre of Conventions Puebla William Or. Jenkins) covered in talavera (classical of the city of Puebla).

Some seven years later the Complejo Cultural Universitario, cultural centre of the Benemérita Autonomous University of Puebla asked the Mtro. Bayro Corrochano to construct a sculptural piece for the "Andador Cultural"; the piece chosen was L Preja del Trompo (The Spin-Top Couple) a woman carried on a man´s shoulders, who is also holding a spin-top, all in perfect balance.

== Work ==
- El Hombre Azul (The Blue Man, 2006). Concrete covered in Talavera. 5 metres height. With the face relaxed, drawn and cut in planes cut where it shows an expression of hope; his very strong and formed hands shows the instruments which he identifies himself and uses to transform the materials; finally, the chair of three legs remind us the trilogy where assent the economic concept that moves to the modern societies: production, distribution and consumption. The sculpture is covered in talavera painted in blue tones, on a bed of white stone.
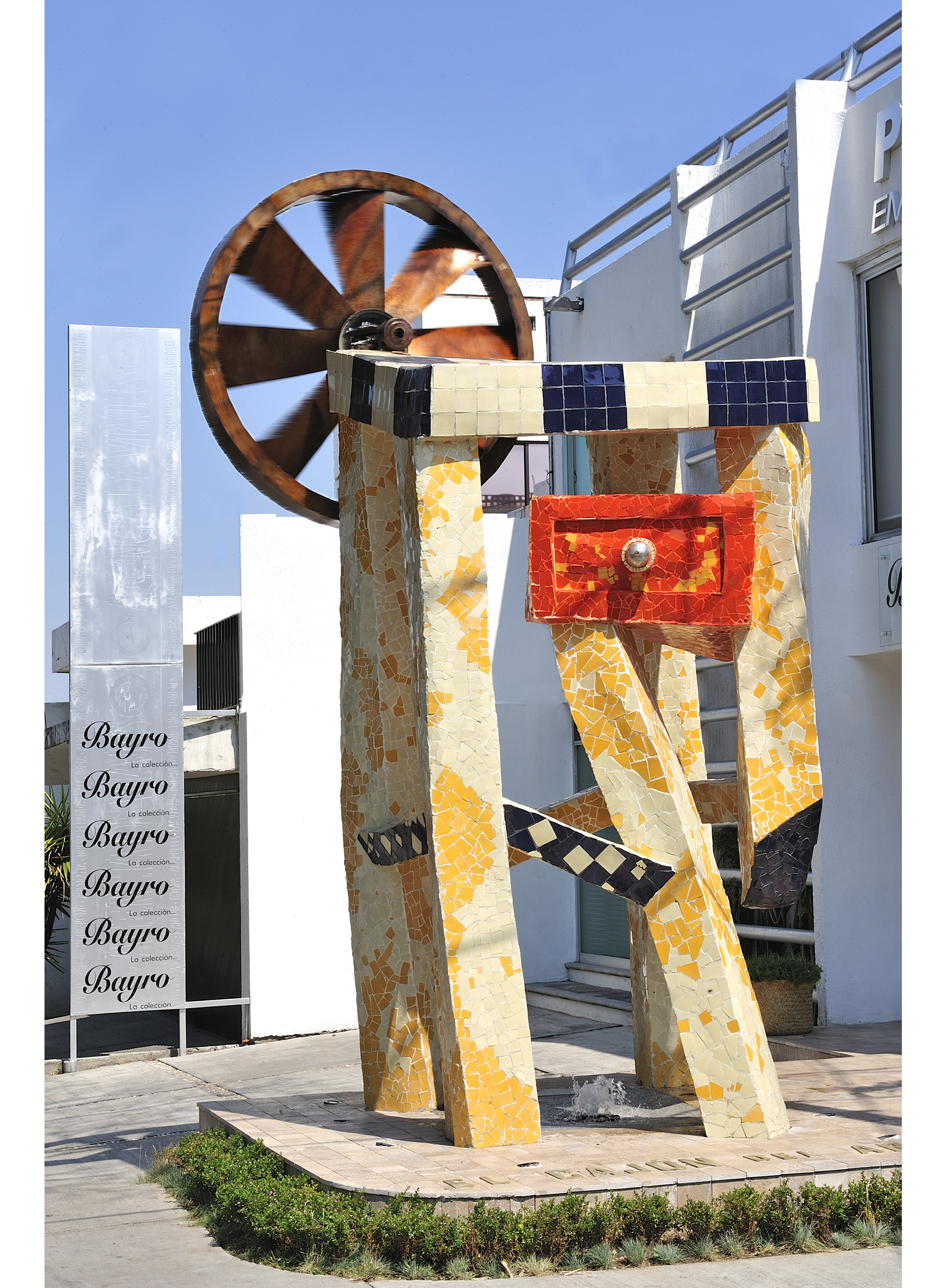
- The work “El cajón del artesano" (The Artisan´s drawer) is a sculptural work which form can not be define but represents workbench.
  El cajón del artesano (The Artisan´s drawer, 2010). Concrete covered in Talavera. 5 metres height.
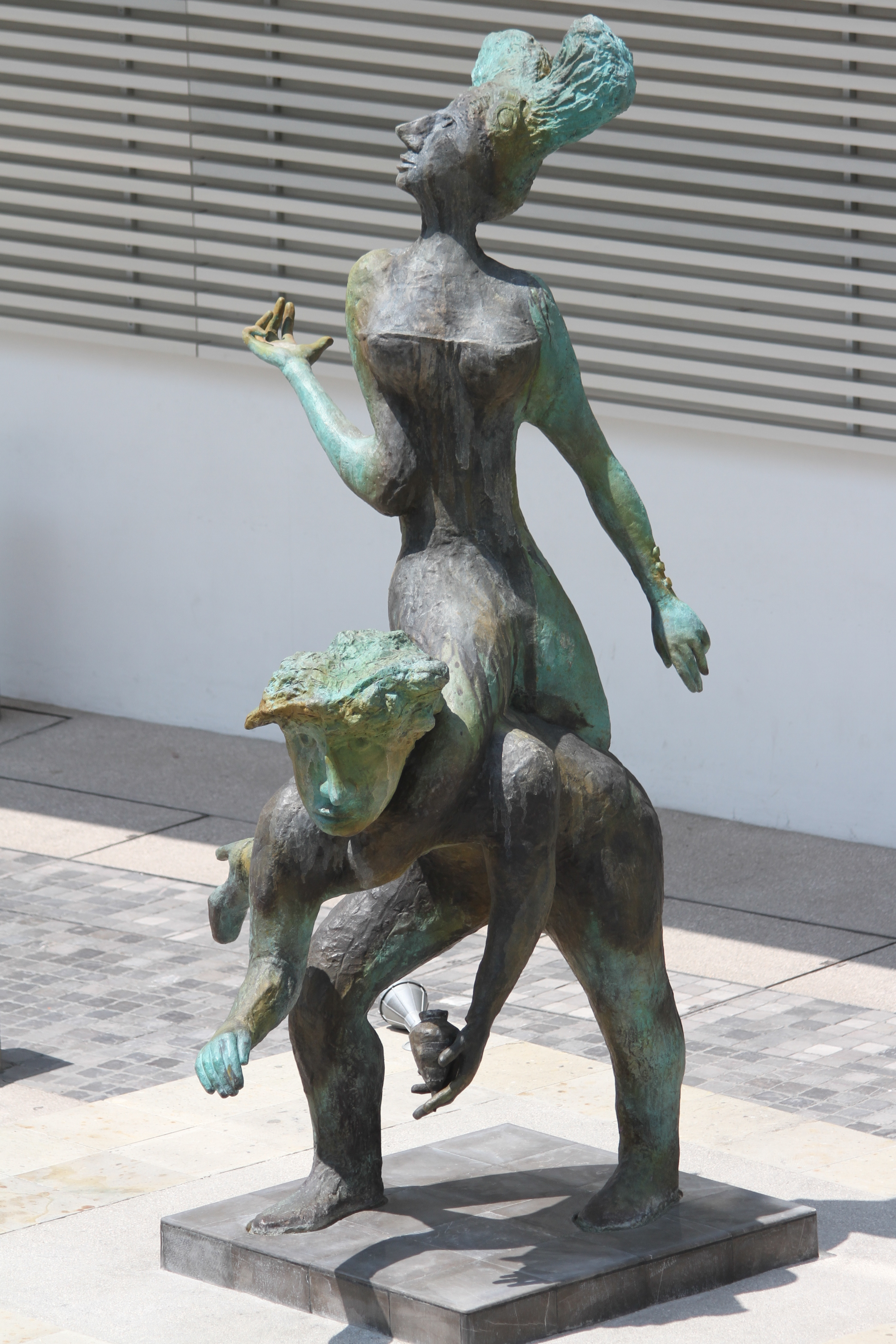
- The work “La pareja del trompo” (The Spin-top Couple) is a sculptural work of big format made by three paramount elements: A man carrying a woman on his shoulders and a spin-top in his left hand.
  La pareja del trompo (The Spin-top Couple, 2013) Bronze. 3.20 metres.

As the Teacher M.C. Escher Or Francisco Toledo, Bayro Corrochano keeps out of any cánon or artistic current.

== Artist's production ==
From 1985 to 2007 he has participated in more than 40 individual exhibitions and his work has been selected in biennials organized in Mexico, Puerto Rico and France. He has participated in biennial in Puerto Rico, France, Mexico and Peru; in this last country like artist invited.

He has been member of the jury of the Fondo Nacional para la Cultura y las Artes (National Fund for Culture and Arts) (Fonca), in the program of Scholarships for Young Creators in 1998.

He published in 2013 the book " Distortion of the values in escape ", which was presented in the Palacio de Bellas Artes (Palace of Fine arts) .D.F., in the city of Oaxaca, Mexico; in the city of Lima, Peru; and in the National Museum of the Arts in The Peace, Bolivia. He has promoted also the First Biennial of Childish Drawing Bayro in these two last countries.

His work can be admire in public collections like The Academy of Saint Carlos, Mexico; the Complejo Cultural Universitario in Puebla, Mexico; the Museu National of Art (Bolívia); The Opportunity House, Hendersonville, North Carolina, United States, the Museum of the Recorded Contemporary Spanish of Marbella, Spain; and in the ICPNA, in Lima, Peru. Also it has been purchased for private collections in Mexico, Bolivia, Canada, United States, England, Germany, Spain, France, the Netherlands and Japan.

In 2014, was awarded with the ALUX to the Eminence by Editorial Síntesis.

His work has received comments by Jorge Zabala, Luis Rius Marry, Jorge Mancilla, Juan Acha, Héctor Chance, Roberto Valcárcel, Pedro Angel Palou, Montserrat Galí, Juan Antonio Montiel, Carlos Monsiváis and Mark Jenkins- The Washington Post, Alberto Salamanca Meadow, among others.
