= Buenfil =

Buenfil is a surname. Notable people with the surname include:

- Alberto Ruz Buenfil (born 1945), Mexican activist
- Erika Buenfil (born 1963), Mexican actress, television host, and singer
