= Gilberto Mora =

Mexican footballer (born 2008)

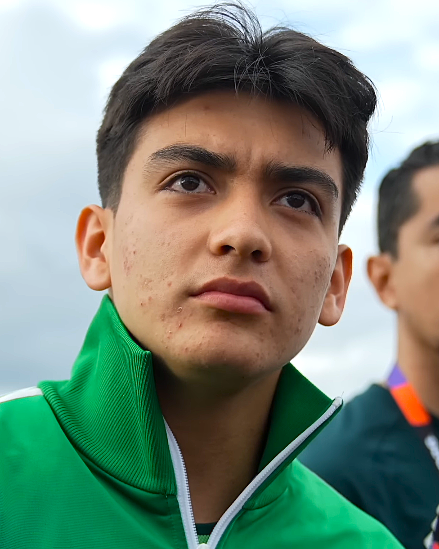
- Mora with Mexico in 2026

Personal information
- Full name: Gilberto Rafael Mora Zambrano
- Date of birth: 14 October 2008 (age 18)
- Place of birth: Tuxtla Gutiérrez, Chiapas, Mexico
- Height: 1.68 m (5 ft 6 in)
- Position: Attacking midfielder

Team information
- Current team: Tijuana
- Number: 10

Youth career
- 2019–2024: Tijuana

Senior career*
Years	Team	Apps	(Gls)
2024–	Tijuana	61	(14)

International career^{‡}
2022–2023	Mexico U15	16	(9)
2023–	Mexico U16	3	(1)
2024–	Mexico U17	4	(2)
2025–	Mexico U20	5	(3)
2025–	Mexico	15	(2)
Medal record
Men's football
Representing Mexico
CONCACAF Gold Cup
Winner	2025 United States–Canada
- * Club domestic league appearances and goals as of 20 November 2026 ‡ National team caps and goals as of 17 November 2026

Gilberto Rafael Mora Zambrano (born 14 October 2008) is a Mexican professional footballer who plays as an attacking midfielder for Liga MX club Tijuana and the Mexico national team.

== Early life and personal life ==
Mora was born on 14 October 2008 in Tuxtla Gutiérrez, Chiapas, Mexico. He is the son of former footballer Gilberto Mora. He studied high school at the Colegio Alemán Cuauhtémoc Hank in Tijuana, graduating in 2026, although he was unable to be present due to the 2026 FIFA World Cup activities.

Mora will study business administration online at the Anahuac University, beginning Autumn 2026.

== Club career ==
Mora joined the youth academy of Club Tijuana, and was described as "one of the most outstanding players in the lower divisions of the team". After just a few weeks of training with the first-team, head coach Juan Carlos Osorio included Mora in the squad for the 2024–25 season.

On 19 August 2024, he made his Liga MX debut against Santos Laguna, replacing Efraín Álvarez in the 72nd minute and provided the assist for Jaime Álvarez's goal in Tijuana's 3–1 victory. At 15 years, ten months and five days old, Mora became Tijuana's youngest-ever debutant, the third-youngest player to debut in Liga MX, and the youngest player to provide an assist. On 31 August, Mora scored his first goal in Tijuana's 2–1 win over León, becoming the youngest player to score in the Mexican top flight at 15 years and 320 days old.

On 31 July 2025, Mora scored his first brace in Tijuana's 5–2 Leagues Cup defeat against LA Galaxy. On 16 August, returning to Liga MX, Mora scored in his team's 2–0 away victory against Pachuca. On 22 August, Mora scored another brace, this time in a 3–3 draw against Guadalajara.

== International career ==
As a youth international, Mora has played for Mexico's under-15, under-16, and under-17 teams. He made sixteen appearances and scored nine goals while playing for the under-15 side, and captained the under-17 team as a 15-year old.

On 16 January 2025, Mora made his debut with the senior side in an unofficial friendly against SC Internacional, a team from Campeonato Brasileiro Série A, making him the youngest player to appear for the national team at 16 years old.

Mora was included in the provisional 60-man list for the 2025 CONCACAF Nations League Finals, and made the 26-man squad for the 2025 CONCACAF Gold Cup. On 28 June, he received a starting berth in the quarter-final match against Saudi Arabia, thereby officially becoming the youngest-ever player to debut for Mexico, aged 16 years and 257 days, surpassing previous record of Luis Ernesto Pérez. In the semi-final, Mora provided his first assist in the 1–0 victory over Honduras. He then started in the final against the United States, where Mexico would win their 10th title, becoming the youngest player ever to lift an international trophy. Later that year, he was called up by coach Eduardo Arce to represent Mexico at the FIFA U-20 World Cup held in Chile.

On 31 May 2026, Mora was called up for the 2026 FIFA World Cup, becoming the tournament's youngest player. He made his World Cup debut on 11 June, coming on as a substitute against South Africa in the opening match and setting a record as the youngest Mexican player to feature in the tournament, aged 17 years and 240 days, breaking previous record of Manuel Rosas in 1930. He started the round of 32 match against Ecuador, becoming the second-youngest player to start a World Cup knockout match at the age of 17 years and 259 days, behind only Pelé in 1958.

== Career statistics ==
=== Club ===
As of match played on 20 November 2026

Appearances and goals by club, season and competition
Club	Season	League			National cup		Other		Total	
Club	Season	Division	Apps	Goals	Apps	Goals	Apps	Goals	Apps	Goals
Tijuana	2024–25	Liga MX	30	2	—		—		30	2
Tijuana	2025–26	Liga MX	20	6	—		3 (Note: Appearances in Leagues Cup)	2	23	8
Tijuana	2026–27	Liga MX	11	6	—		2	0	13	6
Career total			61	14	0	0	5	2	66	16

=== International ===
As of match played on 17 November 2026

Appearances and goals by national team and year
National team	Year	Apps	Goals
Mexico	2025	5	0
Mexico	2026	10	2
Total		15	2

As of match played on 26 September 2026
Scores and results list Mexico's goal tally first, score column indicates score after each Mora goal.

List of international goals scored by Gilberto Mora
No.	Date	Venue	Cap	Opponent	Score	Result	Competition
1	26 September 2026	M&T Bank Stadium, Baltimore, United States	13	Colombia	1–1	1–1	Friendly
2	14 November 2026	Independence Park, Kingston, Jamaica	14	Jamaica	1–3	2–3	2026–27 CONCACAF Nations League A

== Honours ==
Mexico

- CONCACAF Gold Cup: 2025

Individual

- Liga MX All-Star: 2025, 2026
- IFFHS Men's Youth (U20) CONCACAF Best XI: 2025

Records

- Youngest player ever to win a senior international tournament
- Youngest goalscorer in Liga MX history
- Youngest player to debut for the Mexico national team
