= Fritz Bieler =

Fritz Bieler (September 9, 1895 - September 1, 1957) was a German aviator that served in the First World War, and in 1921 was hired as a flight instructor by the Mexican Air Force.

Fritz Bieler died in Mexico City on 1 September 1957.
