= FXM =

FXM may refer to:

- FX Movie Channel, an American television channel
- Force for Mexico (Spanish: Fuerza por México), a Mexican political party
