= Enrique Bostelmann =

Mexican photographer (1939-2003)

Enrique Bostelmann (March 1939 – December 3, 2003) was a Mexican photographer known for his artistic work related to social problems as well as the use of objects and concepts from other artistic disciplines such as sculpture in his work. He did commercial work such as publicity, documentary and photographic reproductions of artwork. However, it was his personal projects in which he experimented with subjects, styles and techniques, which were exhibited in Mexico, other parts of Latin America, the U.S. and Europe from the start of his career in the 1960s until his death in 2003. His artistic work is basically of two types: the first exploring social issues and the second conceptualist, using common objects and concepts from other creative disciplines to create photographic images. Although he won no major awards for his work, he was selected as a judge for a number of competition and was inducted as a member of the Salón de la Plástica Mexicana.

== Life ==
Enrique Bostelmann was born in Guadalajara in March 1939. He was tall, husky, blonde and very fair skinned because of his German heritage, which gave him the nickname of “El Sol” (The Sun). He suffered from nystagmus, a constant involuntary movement of the eyes, but it did not interfere with his photographic ability. His widow described him as “consistent, very honest, very formal, hard-working, a fighter and dry, demanding honesty, uprightness.

In 1957 he received a scholarship to study photography for three years at the Bayerische Staatslehranstalt fur Photographie in Munich, beginning his career soon afterwards. This career consisted of publicity, documentary and personal, artistic work. Much the last is related to extensive travels in Mexico, Latin America and Europe in which he photographed scenes and objects.

He married Yeyete Bostelmann with whom he had two children Saskia and Alexis. He died on December 3, 2003, at age 64, of heart stoppage while on his way to a routine photography appointment in the Polanco neighborhood of Mexico City.

== Career ==
Bostelmann began his photography career in 1961, which spanned over four decades until his death. He did publicity, documentary and artistic work, not making a strict distinction between publicity and documental, taking photos of industry, businesses, rural scenes, fashion, food and social scenes. He was also noted as a specialist in the photographic reproduction of art.

His artistic work was mostly for his own personal satisfaction, without the intention of sale. However, this work was exhibited in over fifty individual and collective exhibitions.

His first individual exhibition was at the Exposición Club Fotográfico de México in 1961 and his last called Estática Fugaz del tiempo in 2007 at the Gallery of the Mexico City International Airport. In between individual exhibitions where staged in various parts of Mexico as well as North America, Europe and South America. Important shows include Due Mondi in Rome (1969), Paisaje del Hombre at the Museo de Arte Moderno (1973), La Piel de Aguas in Mexico, Venezuela, Ecuador, Peru and Panama (1974-1975), Exposición Integración Visual in various cities in Venezuela (1977), Exposición Comunicación Visual at UAM-Xochimilco (1976), Muestras Fotograficas at the World Trade Center New York (1977), Suicidio y Muerte Natural at the Colegio de México (1979), Fotomorfosis in Mexico City, Brasília, Buenos Aires, Caracas, Maricabo and Bogotá (1977-1979), Estructura y Biografía de un Objeto in Mexico City (1978-1979), Quince Murales, Knoxville (1982), Juan de la Mancha in Mexico City (1986), La Vida Todos los días in Mexico City (1987), Espacios Habitados at the Polyforum Cultural Siqueiros (1994), a retrospective shown in various countries in Europe in Berlin, Bonn, Budapest, Prague and Łódź, Poland (1993-1994), Los Entusiamos de la Belleza at the Centro Cultural Tijuano (1996), a retrospective at the Art Institutes of Dallas, Fort Lauderdale and Houston (1997), Secuencias y Consecuencias in various parts of Mexico (1997- 1998), Memoria del Tiempo in Querétaro (1999), Memories of History in Washington, New York and Montreal (2004-2006) and Tiempo Recurperado and Estática Fugaz del Tiempo in various parts of Mexico (2001-2007) . He participated in about forty collective exhibitions from 1958 to 2002 both in Mexico and abroad. After his death, there have been several exhibitions of his work including Enrique Bostelmann: Imagen, espacio inagotable at the Museo de Arte Moderno in 2013.

Books published with and about his work include América: Un Viaje a Través de la Injusticia (1970, 1984) with prologue written by Carlos Fuentes, El Paisaje de México (1974), Estructura y Biografía de un Objeto (1980), Juan de la Mancha (1982), Los Murales de Bellas Artes (1996), Los Murales de Tamayo (1997), Los Murales del Palacio Nacional (1997), Los Murales de Siqueiros (1998), Federico Silva-La Cueva de Huites Una Pintura Rupestra al Norte de Sinaloa (1998), Sebastián: El Lenguaje del Universo (1999), Alameda:Visión Histórica y Estética de la Alameda de la Cd. De México (2000) and No Anunciar: Narrativa Fotografía (2003) . His work also appears in some editions published abroad such as Contemporary Photographers (London, 1981), World History of Photography (New York, 1985) and The Photobook: A History, Vol. 1 (London, 2004).

As an artist he did not win major awards for his work, mostly because such did not exist in Mexico during his lifetime. However, he was recognized in other ways. He served as a judge and conference speaker at events such as the Biena de Artes Gráficas and the Bienal de Fotografía, both of the Instituto Nacional de Bellas Artes; the Instituto de Bellas Artes of Caracas, Venezuela; the Premio Kinsa in Rochester, NY; the Premio Geomundo in Mexico City; the Premio Casa de la Américas in Havana, Cuba and the Universiada in Mexico City.From 1983 to 1986, he was the vice president of the Consejo Mexicano de Fotografía. He was accepted as a member of the Salón de la Plástica Mexicana along with Manuel Álvarez Bravo and Graciela Iturbide .

His work can be found in institutions such as the National Library of France, the Museo de Bellas Artes in Caracas, the Contemporary Arts Museum Houston, the Art Institute of Chicago, the Albuquerque Museum, the University of Arizona, the Centro de Arte Contemporáneo in Mexico City, the Museo de Arte Moderno and the National Photographic Archives of Mexico in Pachuca as well as in private collections in the United States, South America and Tokyo.

He taught photography at the Instituto Paúl Coremans in Mexico City.

His career resulted in an archive of over 200,000 negative and about 5,000 prints. Although some of this archive was donated to the Centro de Imagen in Mexico, much remains in the possession of the family, which stores it at the family home in San Ángel, Mexico City, which is clean, but lacks professional conservation facilities. Much of the archive contains images of rural Mexico from the 1950s to the 1970s. Any money earned with the photographs is put back into equipment needed to preserve the collection.

== Artistry ==
Bostelmann is considered to be one of the most important Mexican photographers of the second half of the 20th century. Like Mariana Yampolsky and Manuel Alvarez Bravo, whose work is often compared to his, he called himself a “seeker of light.” He believed that photography changed the way man sees himself and how he relates to the rest of the world since photography is now part of many routine and grand events in life. His most passionate work involved studying something in depth, generally with a theme, such as a street, a neighborhood, a religious space or a shopping center. He experimented with both black-and-white and color photography as well as print techniques, but his best-known innovations are related to subject matter as well as collaboration with other creative people such as writers, painters and sculptors. His photography avoided ideological overtones and his photography of his home country of Mexico was not overly sentimental, folkloric or exotic, even though he photography much of the rural areas of the country from the late 1950s through the 1960s.

A significant portion of his work, especially his early work, is related to social problems and anthropology, as part of a generation of young, “rebellious” photographers such as Pedro Meyer, José Luis Neira and Lázaro Blanco . Much of this early work comes from the 1960s, when he extensively travelled in Latin America, including Mexico, photographing common people. Much of this work became part of a series called Paisaje del hombre (Landscape of man) and a book called América, un viaje a través de la injusticia (America, a voyage across injustice), published in 1970. The first is a series of diverse images, both depicting landscapes which have been heavily altered by human activity as well as depicting the human body as a landscape. Many of these photographs included images that were unusual and abstract. The book explore social problems in Mexico and other countries in Latin America. A later, socially themed work was to photograph the wall along the U.S.-Mexican border in Tijuana .

His work was influenced the conceptualist movement in the 1970s. He began to work with creators from other fields, such as sculpture, paintings, writers and architecture. For this, art critics such as Raquel Tibol and the Museo de Arte Moderno have judged his work to “transcend” the limit of the medium. One of these was to experiment with the use of installations and art objects, gathering and creating objects for the purpose of photography rather than for their own existence. El despliegue de la imagen gathers industrial materials and publicity to create images. La ola es agua y también escultura is a series of images that explores the possibility that photography has, linked with the other arts. Its name was taken from the eulogy of Mathias Goeritz . His best-known work from this time is in collaboration with sculptor Sebastián using ordinary objects such as a coffee pot, combining the concepts of photography and sculpture. The object would be put in different situations such as in liquid, frozen, flattened, set as if conversing with another object and more. Many photos are portraits of objects, influenced by photography work done in the 1920s as well as his relationship with Mathias Goeritz and Sebastián. He photographed unusual items such as a roll of barbed wire, a hanging hose, a clothesline, a well-worn tire, TV antennas and water storage tanks. Some of these object studies were part of portraits of notable people such as Chucho Reyes and Juan O'Gorman . Some completely stood in for the person such as Manuel Felguérez’s pipe surrounded by burned wooden matches, empty paint tubes belonging to Arnold Belkin and Salvador Novo’s old worn typewriter, which he gave to Emilio Carballido. These portraits avoid sentimentality but are emotive.

Other work experimented with three-dimensional and other effects. One of these is “Nudo en la garganta” (Knot (lump) in the throat), which is an image of several congested roadways twisted together. Another photographs if of an old cabin whose falling window seems touchable. Sucedió en el metro is an over print of images to create a commentary of the Mexico City metro system .
