= Colegio Alemán de Guadalajara =

Location
- Zapopan, Jalisco, Greater Guadalajara; Mexico
- Coordinates: 20.771944°N 103.37943000000001°W

Information
- Type: German international school
- Established: 1979
- Grades: Kindergarten through bachillerato

The Colegio Alemán de Guadalajara A.C. is a German international school in Zapopan, Jalisco, in Greater Guadalajara. The school serves kindergarten through bachillerato (high school). It was founded in 1979. The school offers the IB Diploma Programme for their students.

== See also ==
- German immigration to Mexico
