= Battle of Salvatierra =

1813 naval battle in Guanajuato, Mexico

The Battle of Salvatierra was a naval battle that occurred in Salvatierra, Guanajuato, Mexico, a town located on the banks of the Lerma River. It took place on Good Friday, April 16, 1813.
