= 2023 Nuevo Laredo military shooting =

Mass shooting in Mexico

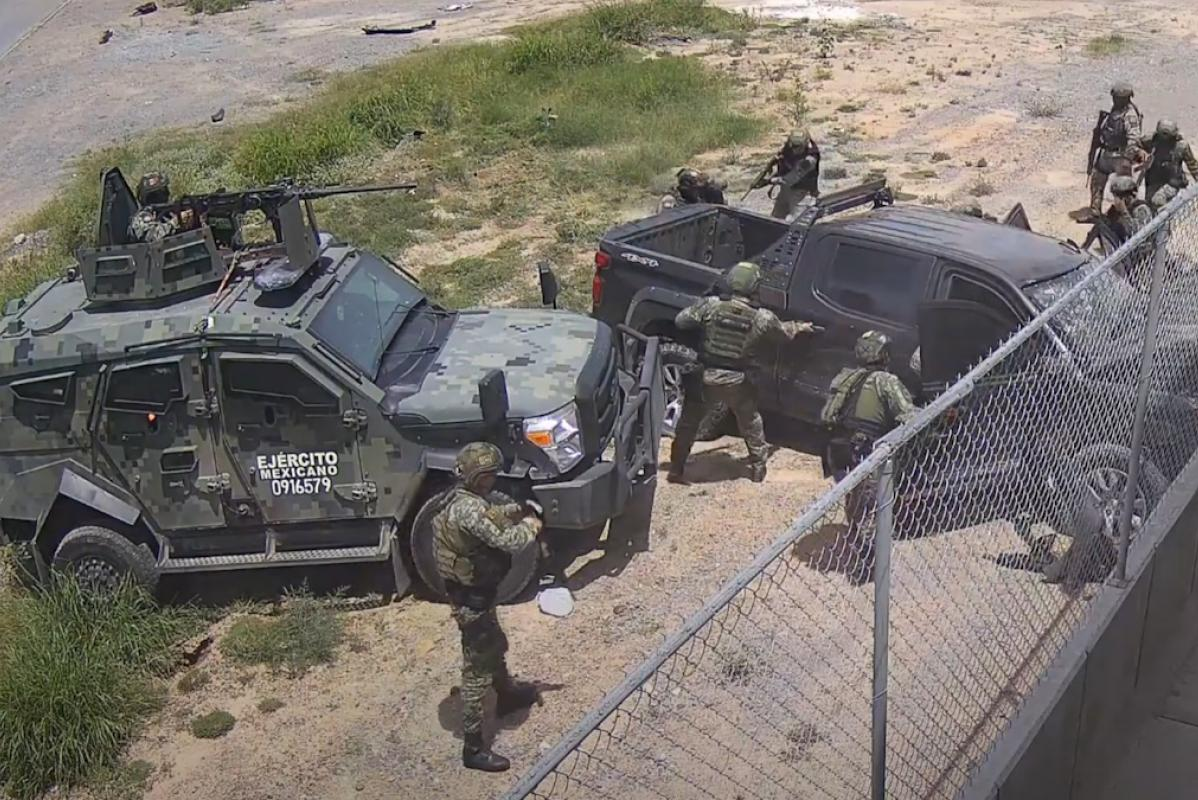
CCTV footage of the killing

On 26 February 2023, five unarmed civilians were killed by Mexican Army troops in Nuevo Laredo, Tamaulipas, when soldiers fired at a pickup truck under disputed circumstances. A human rights group said that the dead were youths returning from a nightclub. The soldiers said the pickup truck had refused orders to stop. Three bodies were found inside the truck, while two bodies were found on the sidewalk; a sixth occupant of the vehicle was injured but survived. Official reports did not make any mention of finding weapons on the bodies or any indication that the youths had been armed.

Riots broke out in response, and a soldier was beaten by rioters. Gunshots were also heard, reportedly by the military firing into the crowd.
