= Rosalía Peredo =

Mexican politician (1951–2023)

Rosalía Peredo Aguilar (4 December 1951 – 20 June 2023) was a Mexican politician who served in the upper house of Congress. Although she was a member of the National Action Party (PAN), most of her political experience came from center and center-left political parties.

== Political career ==
Peredo held a bachelor's degree in political science and administration. She was an active member of the Worker's Revolutionary Party (PRT) and in 1985, was elected a PRT federal deputy, serving during the LIII Legislature of Congress (1985–1988). Peredo left the PRT and joined the Labor Party (PT), serving again in the Chamber of Deputies, this time representing the PT during the LVIII Legislature.

In 2006 she left the PT to run as the National Action Party candidate for the Senate representing the State of Tlaxcala; she secured that state's first minority seat.

== Death ==
Peredo died on 20 June 2023, at the age of 71.
