= Dora María =

Mexican singer (1933–2023)

- Born: Dora María Pérez Vidal; 30 August 1933; Tamulté de las Barrancas, Villahermosa, Tabasco, Mexico
- Died: 4 June 2023 (aged 89)
- Other names: La Chaparrita de Oro
- Occupation: Folk singer

Dora María Pérez Vidal (30 August 1933 – 4 June 2023), known by her stage name Dora María and her nickname La Chaparrita de Oro (The Golden Short Woman), was a Mexican singer of folk music. At the time of her death, she was one of the last surviving stars from the Golden Age of Mexican cinema. She was a native of Tamulté de las Barrancas, a neighborhood of, Villahermosa, the capital of Tabasco, Mexico.

María died from respiratory arrest on 4 June 2023, at the age of 89.
