= Death of Norma Lizbeth Ramos =

2023 Mexican bullying and killing case

- Born: Norma Lizbeth Ramos Pérez; April 25, 2008; State of Mexico, Mexico
- Died: March 13, 2023 (aged 14); San Juan Teotihuacán, State of Mexico, Mexico
- Cause of death: Head trauma
- Occupation: Secondary student

On February 21, 2023, Norma Lizbeth Ramos, a 14-year-old Mexican student was summoned to a fight by Azahara Aylin Martínez, a classmate. That day, Ramos was hit multiple times with a rock in the face and head by Martínez. Ramos had been a victim of bullying by Martinez and other classmates and was a student of Secondary School #0518 (Escuela Secundaria #0518), located in the municipality of San Juan Teotihuacán, State of Mexico. On March 13, Ramos died due to injuries and brain trauma caused by Martínez.

The event was recorded by the girls' classmates and published on social media, the video went viral. The video showed no empathy from the other students who witnessed the moment, who mocked and supported Martinez instead of stopping her. On November 14, Martínez was sentenced to three years of confinement in the detention center for adolescents Quinta del Bosque.

The violent nature of the event, as well as the inability of the educational establishment to prevent this death, caused a widespread social upheaval in Mexico. With the problems of bullying, racism and discrimination that are experienced in the country also resurfaced. The case is popularly known as the Norma Lizbeth Case (Caso Norma Lizbeth).

== Background ==
Norma Lizbeth Ramos Pérez was born on April 25, 2008, in State of Mexico. She was a 14-year-old third year student in Secondary School #0518 (Escuela Secundaria #0518). According to some students, Ramos had been a victim of bullying and discrimination since elementary school, because of her skin color. The attacks that she received included assaults, humiliation and abuse, all perpetrated by classmates, in especially from a female classmate Azahara Aylin Martínez.

"My daughter did talk to me, she told me that her classmates bullied her because of the color of her skin, because of her hair, because she was pretty, maybe that's why they did a lot of things to her, my daughter was very quiet, because I advised her that she was not rude and whatever thing that happen, she need to tell to the teacher."

— Norma Lizbeth Ramos' mother, explaining the reasons her daughter suffered bullying.

The attacks against to her continued once she went to secondary school, which she had expressed on several occasions to her family and teachers, and were the reason why she no longer wanted to attend school.

== Death ==
=== Fight with Martínez ===
Ramos studied in the afternoon shift and had stopped attending due to the bullying of which she was a victim. But she did so one last time on February 21, 2023 at the end of morning classes, this after having been summoned to a fight by another from her classmates, where she went to try to put an end to these attacks that had been ignored by her teachers and the headmistress of the institution.

Her murderer was identified as Azahara Aylin Martínez, who had been harassing her for a long time. Once there, Ramos tried to reconcile the matter by talking to her attacker to avoid hitting her, but Martínez ignored her and began to hit her. During the fight, Martínez used an object, identified as a stone or a horseshoe, which she used several times to hit Ramos in the head and face. The moment was recorded and witnessed by school students, who did not help and only made fun of Ramos. One person said "hit her with balls, hit her hard, hit her in the face," persuading her assailant to continue hitting her. Martínez joined in the mockery saying "blood is coming out".

The fight stopped once a local police patrol arrived at the scene. Later, Ramos was helped by some of the area's inhabitants, who tried to heal her bruises and stop the bleeding she had in her nose.

After the fight, Martínez and Ramos were suspended by the school director for a month, it was also determined that the medical expenses would be covered equally between the families of those involved.

=== Death ===
Ramos was treated by specialists for more than ten days due to a fracture in her nose, but despite this, her health began to deteriorate. Ramos began to suffer headaches, fainting and vomiting, conditions that alerted her relatives on the night of March 12, when she continued vomiting. The next day, the girl worsened while being cared for by Alma, her older sister. Ramos died that same day. Her cause of death was due to head trauma, caused by the blows she received. Her body was buried on March 15 in the municipal pantheon, close to her home located in the Nueva Evangelista neighborhood.

== Aftermath ==
As a result of her death, Ramos's relatives called for a mobilization demanding justice for the incident. On March 16, it was reported that the headmistress of the school was fired.

Martínez and her mother, Magaly, deleted all their social media accounts after the case went viral and they were identified. Shortly after, both had fled the State of Mexico and were detained on the Mexico–United States border. On March 18, the Prosecutor's Office of the State of Mexico announced that Martínez had been arrested in the municipality of Teotihuacán for her possible intervention in qualified homicide, where the victim had also been a minor. Martínez was confined in the Detention Center for Adolescents in the State of Mexico called "Quinta del Bosque". This verdict was reached after a hearing in which 30 days of complementary investigation were granted, with April 17 agreed as the conclusion date.

=== Judgment ===
Immediately after her arrest, Martínez was linked to the process as "alleged" responsible for the murder of Ramos, and was charged with the crime of qualified homicide. On November 14, Martínez was sentenced to three years of confinement in the detention center for adolescents Quinta del Bosque.

== See also ==
- Crime in Mexico
- School bullying
- Death of Nex Benedict
