= Gerardo Islas Maldonado =

Mexican politician (1983–2023)

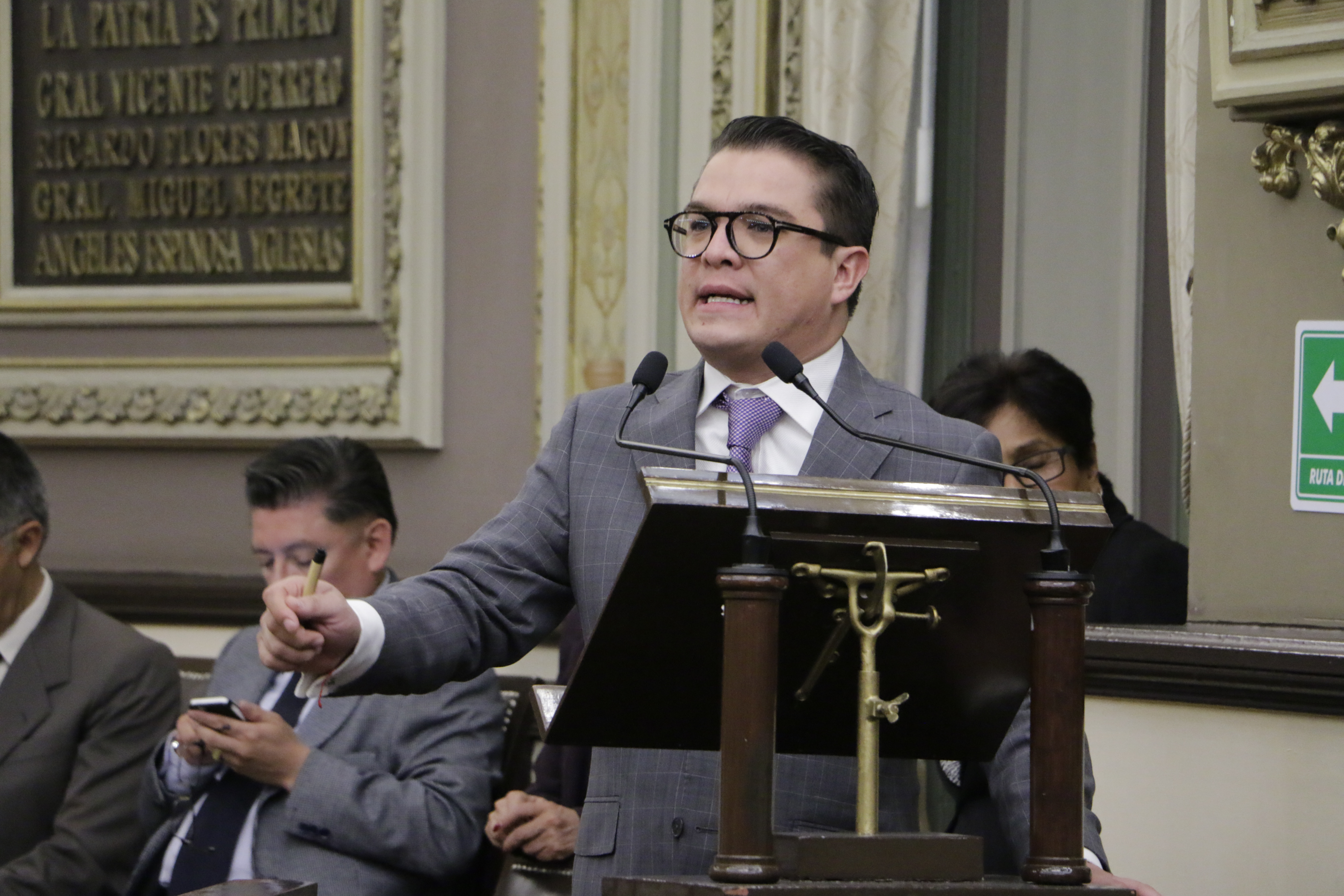
- Islas in 2018

Member of the Congress of Puebla for the 22nd district
- In office 15 September 2018 – 14 September 2021
- Preceded by: María Evelia Rodríguez García
- Succeeded by: Azucena Rosas Tapia

President of the Force for Mexico
- In office 14 October 2020 – 30 August 2021
- Preceded by: Position established
- Succeeded by: Position abolished

Personal details
- Born: Ángel Gerardo Islas Maldonado; 9 September 1983; Puebla, Mexico
- Died: 2 February 2023 (aged 39); Madrid, Spain
- Political party: PNA (until 2018); FXM (2020–2021)
- Education: Universidad Anáhuac Puebla
- Profession: Businessman

Ángel Gerardo Islas Maldonado (9 September 1983 – 2 February 2023) was a Mexican politician. A member of the New Alliance Party and later the Force for Mexico, he served in the Congress of Puebla from 2018 to 2021.

Islas died of a heart attack in Madrid on 2 February 2023, at the age of 39.
