= Colegio Alemán Cuauhtémoc Hank =

Coordinates: 32.5032°N 116.9956°W

Location
- Condesa, Tijuana; Mexico

Information
- Type: German International School
- Grades: Maternal/preschool to high school

Colegio Alemán Cuauhtémoc Hank, A.C. (CACH) is a German international school in Condesa, Tijuana. It serves levels maternal/preschool to high school (preparatoria).

== See also ==
- Education in Mexico
- German Mexicans
