= Rosario Zúñiga =

Mexican actress (1964–2023)

- Born: María Rosario Zúñiga García; 24 February 1964; Mexico City, Mexico
- Died: 18 June 2023 (aged 59); Guadalajara, Mexico
- Occupation: Actress

María Rosario Zúñiga García (24 February 1964 – 18 June 2023) was a Mexican film, television and stage actress, whose career spanned over three decades.

== Life and career ==
Born in Mexico City, Zúñiga started her career as a child actress, appearing in the 1975 film Los supervivientes de los Andes. She graduated in acting from the Escuela Nacional de Arte Teatral of the Instituto Nacional de Bellas Artes y Literatura, and later from the Centro Universitario de Estudios Cinematográficos.

A member of the National Theatre Company of Mexico, Zúñiga had her breakout in 1992, playing a villain role in the telenovela De frente al sol. During her career she appeared in over 15 telenovelas and in over 30 stage works. She made her directorial debut in 1997, directing an episode of the series Hotel Paraíso, and later also worked as a stage director. Also an activist for gender equality, Zúñiga died on 18 June 2023, at the age of 59.
