= Salvatierra massacre =

Christmas party mass shooting in Salvatierra

- Location: Salvatierra, Guanajuato, Mexico
- Date: December 17, 2023; 3:30 a.m
- Attack type: Mass shooting
- Deaths: 11
- Injuries: 24
- Perpetrator: Local Drug Cartel (Alleged)

The 2023 Salvatierra massacre was a mass shooting at a Christmas Party on December 17, 2023, that left approximately 11 people dead and 24 people injured in the outskirts of the city of Salvatierra, Guanajuato, Mexico.

== Background ==
The town of Salvatierra is located in the southern portion of the state of Guanajuato. This area has seen an increase in drug-related violence due in part to its proximity with the neighboring state of Michoacán which is controlled by the CJNG and actively seeks to expand for territory against local drug cartels in the area which are backed by the Sinaloa Cartel.

== Reactions ==
The Guanajuato Attorney General's Office condemned the attack and said that a “multidisciplinary” team would carry out an investigation aimed at detaining the culprits. No arrests were immediately reported.

President Andrés Manuel López Obrador called for the resignation of the Attorney General of Guanajuato, stating that "For that reason too, my respectful insistence in that they change the state prosecutor, who has been there 13 years and has colossal political power."
