= Francisco Molina Ruiz =

Mexican politician (1950–2023)

Member of the Senate of the Republic of Mexico
- In office 1 September 1997 – 31 August 2000

Attorney General of Chihuahua
- In office 1992–1996

Personal details
- Born: Francisco Javier Molina Ruiz; 15 September 1950; Mexico City, Mexico
- Died: 1 July 2023 (aged 72)
- Political party: PAN
- Education: Autonomous University of Chihuahua
- Occupation: Lawyer

Francisco Javier Molina Ruiz (15 September 1950 – 1 July 2023) was a Mexican lawyer and politician. A member of the National Action Party, he served in the Senate of the Republic from 1997 to 2000 after a term as the Attorney General of Chihuahua.

Molina Ruiz died on 1 July 2023, at the age of 72.
