= Salvatierra, Guanajuato =

San Andrés de Salvatierra Ciudad de Salvatierra
- City and municipality
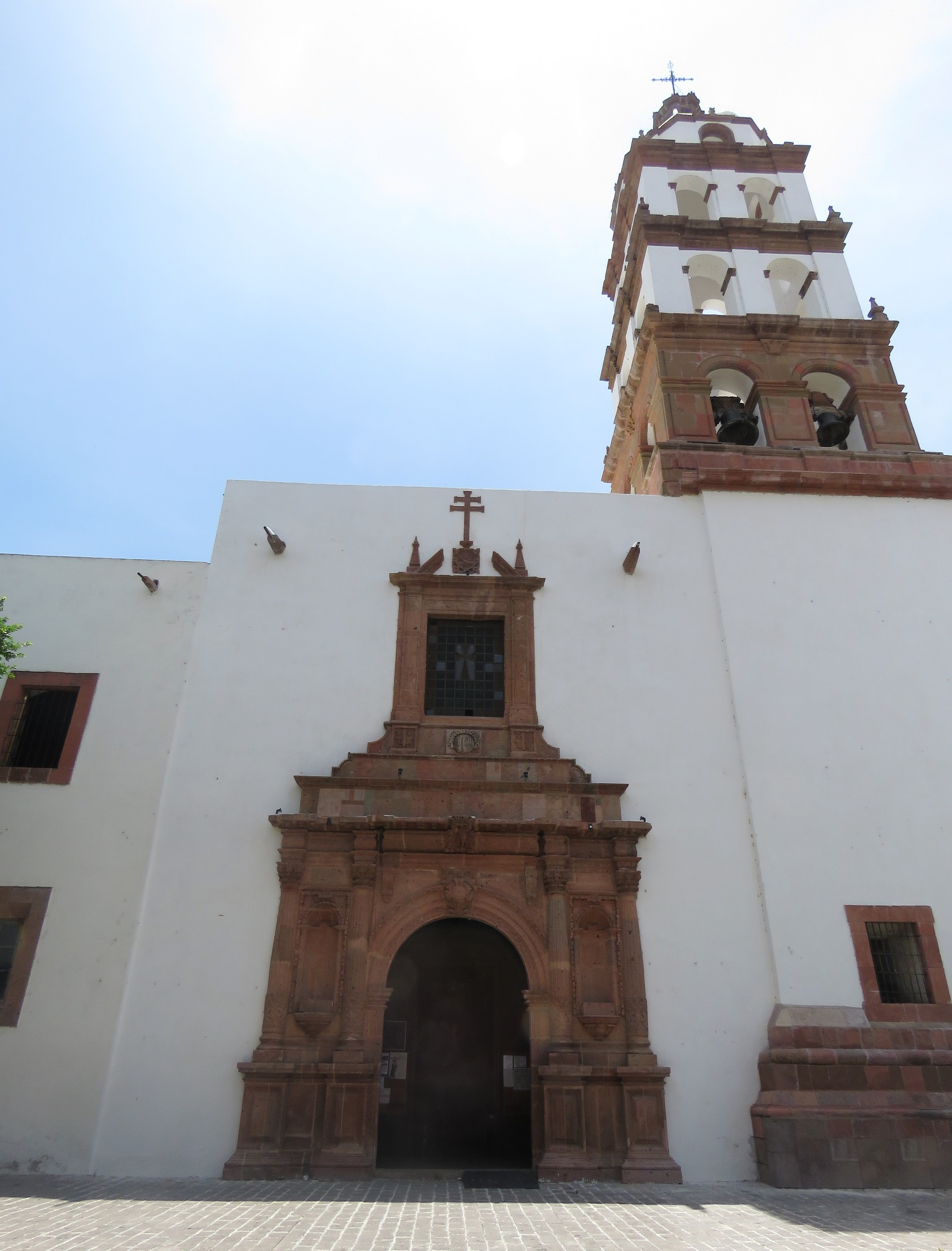
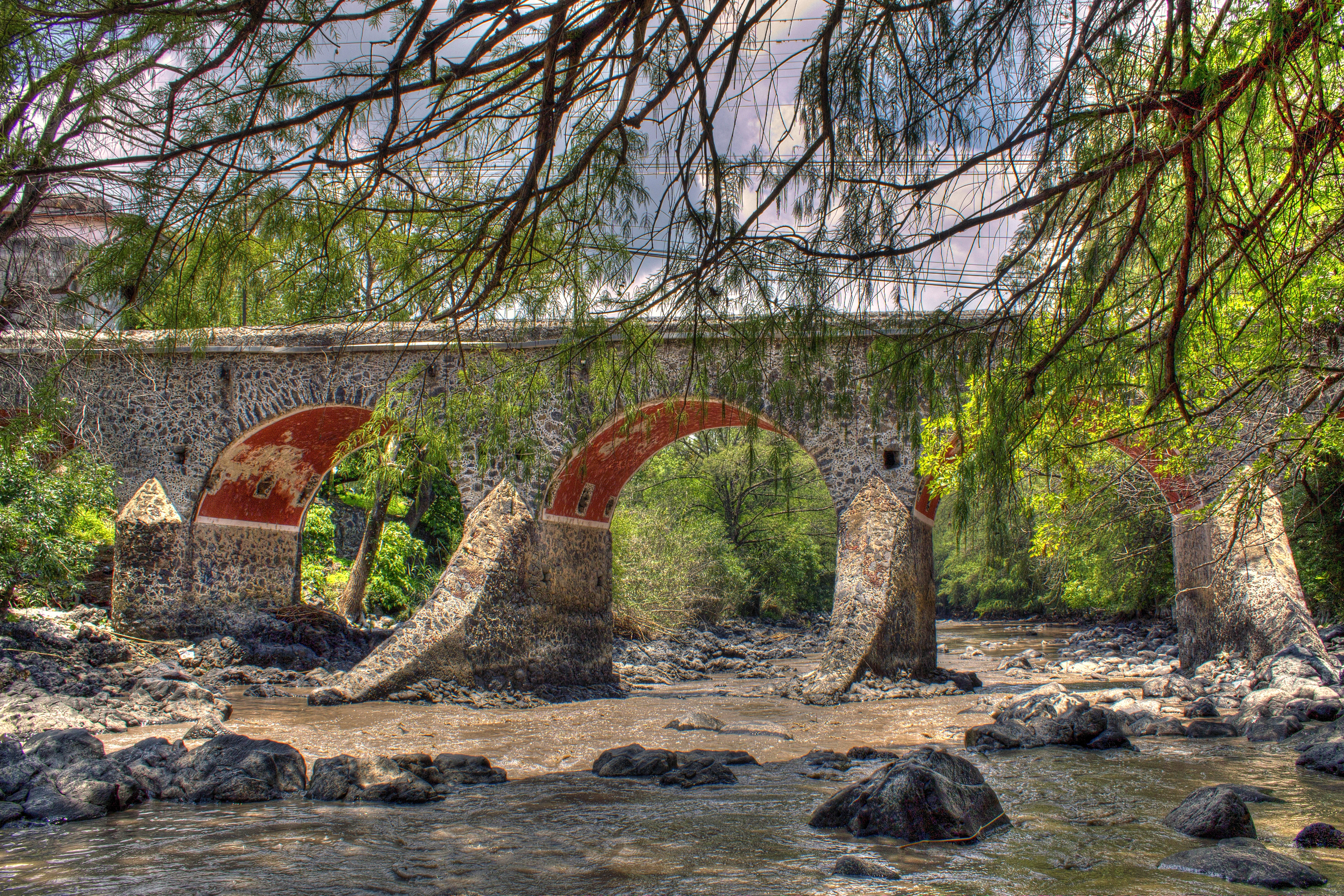
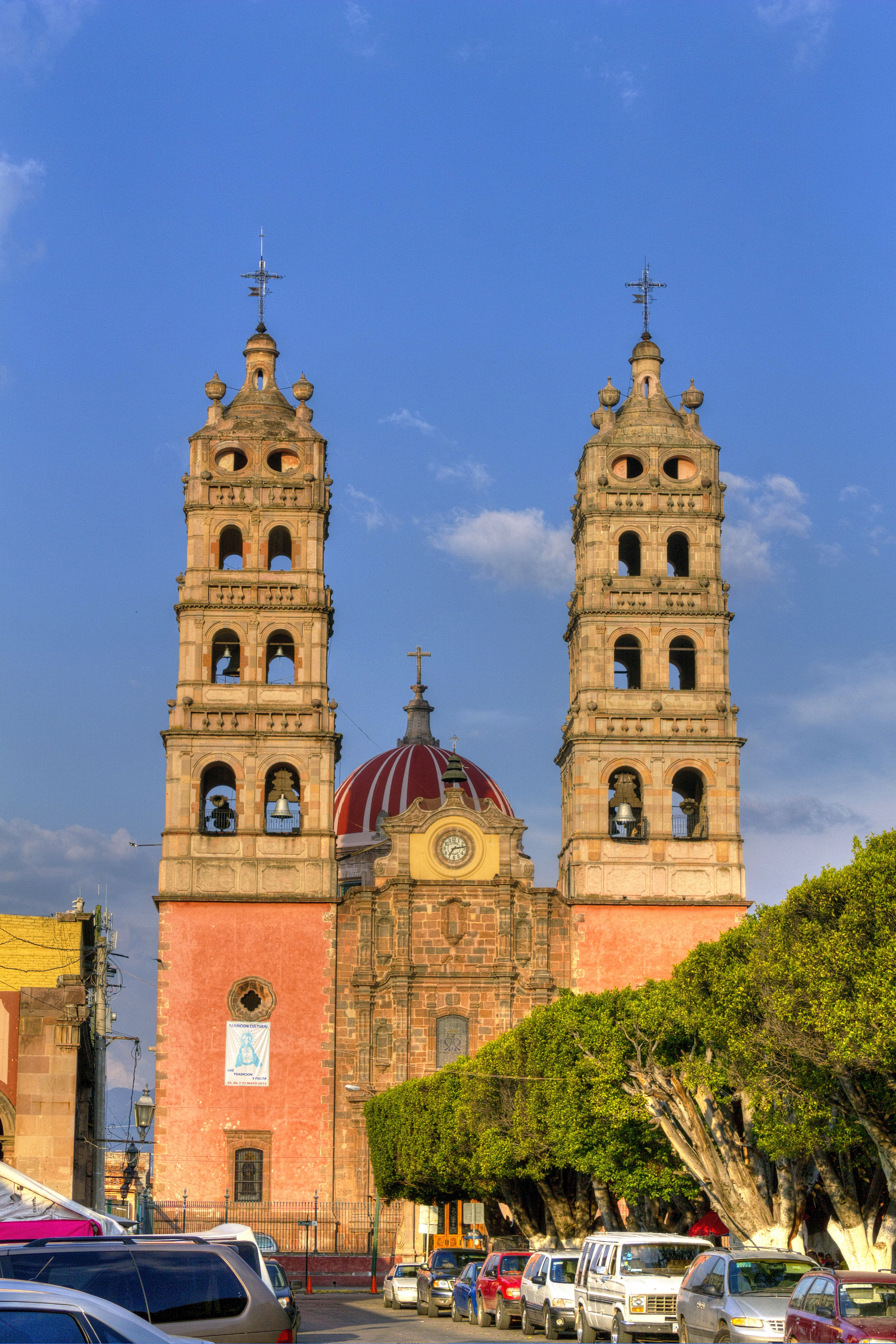
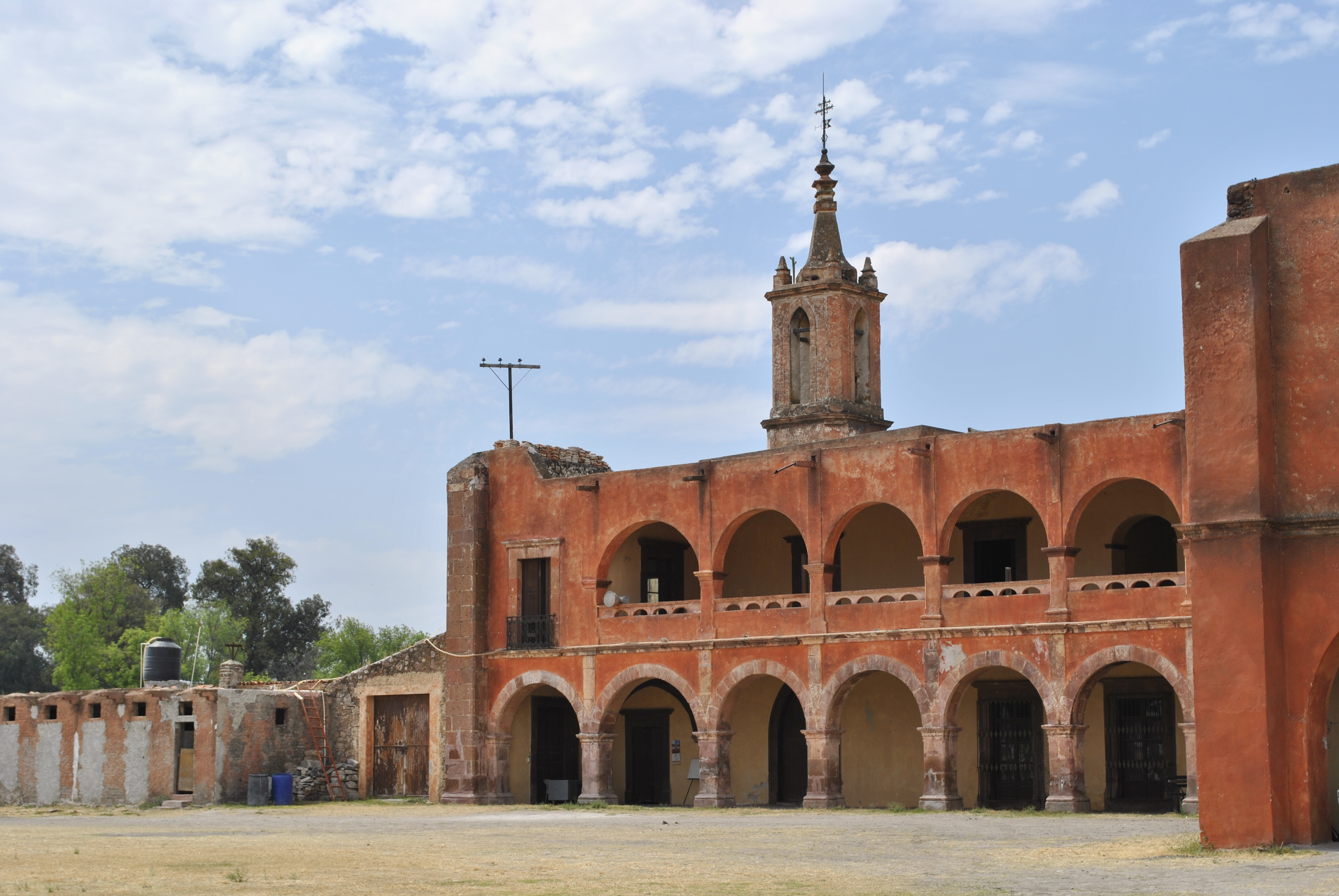
- Clockwise from upper left: View of the Tetilla hills, Templo de San Francisco, the historic Puente de Batanes, Parroquia de Nuestra Señora de la Luz, Templo y Convento Las Capuchinas, Eco Parque El Sabinal, Templo del Señor del Socorro, Ex-Hacienda San José del Carmen and the Salvatierra city sign.

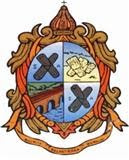
- Coat of arms

- Location within Guanajuato Location within Mexico
- Coordinates: 20°12′56″N 100°53′46″W
- Country: Mexico
- Officially Founded: February 9, 1644 by Garcia Sarmiento de Sotomayor as San Andrés de Salvatierra

Government
  - Municipal president: Germán Cervantes Vega
- Elevation: 1,749 m (5,738 ft)

Population (2020)
  - Total: 35,401
  - Municipality: 94,126
- Demonym: Salvaterrense
- Time zone: UTC-6 (Central Standard Time)
- Postal code: 38900
- Area code: 466
- Website: https://salvatierra.gob.mx/salvatierra/
- Average temperature 18 °C

Salvatierra (Spanish: [salβaˈtjera]) is a Mexican city (and municipality) located in the valley of Huatzindeo in the lowlands of the state of Guanajuato. It is rich in civil and religious architecture; haciendas, bridges, convents and large houses surrounded in tradition and history. With an area of 507.70 square kilometres, Salvatierra accounts for 1.66% the total area of the state. It is bordered to the north by Tarimoro and Cortazar, to the south by Acámbaro and the state of Michoacán, to the west by Yuriria and Santiago Maravatío, and to the northeast by Jaral del Progreso. The municipality had a total of 94,558 inhabitants of whom 34,066 lived in the city of Salvatierra, according to the 2005 census. As of 2020 the municipality had a total of 94,126 inhabitants; compared to 2010, the population in Salvatierra decreased by −3.02%

In pre-Columbian times the area was known as Huatzindeo (or Guatzindeo) which means "Place of beautiful vegetation" by the mostly Purépecha inhabitants. In 1646 Salvatierra became the first city of Guanajuato, thus making it the oldest city in the state. Salvatierra was declared a Pueblo Mágico in 2012 by the Mexican government.

== History ==
The first inhabitants of valley of Huatzindeo belonged to the Chichimeca culture, who by the 12th century were found in many communities across the valley. The Chichimeca were eventually conquered by the Purépecha people, along with most of the lower region of the present-day state of Guanajuato.

The first Europeans to arrive to the valley of Huatzindeo were Franciscan friars who came to the region with the intent of converting the native populations to Christianity. The Franciscan friars built and ran the first Spanish "hospitalillo," hospital, in the indigenous village of Huatziendeo (located to the left of the Lerma river) between 1535 and 1550.

The Franciscan friars were soon joined by caciques and other Spanish pioneers who settled in the valley of Huatzindeo and built haciendas. Much of the hard labor at the haciendas was provided via encomiendas by the indigenous population.

By 1600 typhoid fever, smallpox and other diseases had almost wiped out the native population who lacked the needed antibodies since these diseases were alien to the native population at the time, and the village of Huatzindeo ceased to exist. Many of the Spaniards already in the area relocated to Yuririapundaro, while others remained and founded San Andrés Chochones. San Andrés Chochones was built on the right side of the Lerman river – directly across from where the village of Huatzindeo had once stood.

San Andrés de Salvatierra was founded under the order of Spanish viceroy Don Garcia Sarmiento de Sotomayor, 2nd Count of Salvatierra and Marquis of Sobroso, on February 9, 1644. In 1646 the town was granted the title of city, becoming the first city in the state of Guanajuato.

During the Mexican War of Independence on April 18 of the year 1813 a battle called Batalla del Puente de Batanes took place on the Bridge of Batanes in Salvatierra, between insurgent forces led by Ramón López Rayón, younger brother of the supreme insurgent commander, Ignacio López Rayón, against the royalist forces commanded by Agustín de Iturbide. The "Rayones" seized with fear, mainly the aide-de-camp Pedro Páez, who fled in the middle of the fight, facilitating the escape of other insurgents, ended up losing all their artillery. In addition to losing almost 170 troops who were either dead, imprisoned, or dispersed. However the biggest loss was losing Salvatierra, a base of operations. This was the beginning of the aggrandizement of Iturbide, as the viceroy granted Iturbide a promotion to the rank of colonel.

Due to its rich soil and strategic location (midway between the three most populated areas, namely Mexico City, Guadalajara, and Monterrey) for most of the next three centuries the city was one of the most prosperous in the state of Guanajuato. However, unlike León, Irapuato, and Celaya, Salvatierra never developed into a strong industrial town and has seen its working population shrink with many choosing to relocate to nearby cities and others leaving the country entirely to seek jobs in the United States. Some microregions in the municipality have immigration levels of well over 50%, while the rate stands at 30% in the city.

Cities and areas in the United States with sizable populations from Salvatierra include the metro areas of Los Angeles, Salem, Dallas, Houston, Detroit, Atlanta, Philadelphia, Moline, and Chicago.

The 2023 Salvatierra massacre left approximately 12 people dead and 25 people injured at a private Christmas party.

== Geography ==
Located in the Huatzindeo Valley, Salvatierra belongs to the Guanajuato geographical area of the Southern Valleys or Valles Abajeños. As for orography, the area belongs to the Mexican transversal neo-volcanic axis. In its hydrography, Salvatierra sits on the banks of the Lerma River, which greens the landscape most of the year. Most of the city is on the east bank of the Lerma River.

=== Climate ===
Salvatierra has a mostly warm temperate climate (Köppen climate classification Cwa), while the northernmost areas and some parts to the south having a more temperate climate which could be called subtropical highland climate (Köppen climate classification Cwb).

Climate data for Salvatierra
Month	Jan	Feb	Mar	Apr	May	Jun	Jul	Aug	Sep	Oct	Nov	Dec	Year
Record high °C (°F)	34.0 (93.2)	35.0 (95.0)	34.5 (94.1)	39.5 (103.1)	39.5 (103.1)	37.0 (98.6)	34.0 (93.2)	33.0 (91.4)	33.5 (92.3)	32.5 (90.5)	32.0 (89.6)	32.0 (89.6)	39.5 (103.1)
Mean daily maximum °C (°F)	23.9 (75.0)	25.5 (77.9)	27.6 (81.7)	29.3 (84.7)	30.1 (86.2)	28.6 (83.5)	26.7 (80.1)	26.8 (80.2)	26.6 (79.9)	26.3 (79.3)	25.7 (78.3)	24.3 (75.7)	26.8 (80.2)
Daily mean °C (°F)	14.7 (58.5)	16.0 (60.8)	17.9 (64.2)	19.9 (67.8)	21.3 (70.3)	21.2 (70.2)	20.0 (68.0)	20.0 (68.0)	19.7 (67.5)	18.3 (64.9)	16.6 (61.9)	15.2 (59.4)	18.4 (65.1)
Mean daily minimum °C (°F)	5.5 (41.9)	6.4 (43.5)	8.2 (46.8)	10.4 (50.7)	12.5 (54.5)	13.8 (56.8)	13.3 (55.9)	13.1 (55.6)	12.8 (55.0)	10.2 (50.4)	7.6 (45.7)	6.1 (43.0)	10.0 (50.0)
Record low °C (°F)	−4.0 (24.8)	−3.0 (26.6)	−3.0 (26.6)	2.5 (36.5)	3.0 (37.4)	5.0 (41.0)	8.0 (46.4)	7.5 (45.5)	2.5 (36.5)	0.5 (32.9)	−2.0 (28.4)	−3.0 (26.6)	−4.0 (24.8)
Average precipitation mm (inches)	15.0 (0.59)	8.3 (0.33)	5.9 (0.23)	10.6 (0.42)	34.9 (1.37)	127.8 (5.03)	171.4 (6.75)	161.1 (6.34)	126.7 (4.99)	45.8 (1.80)	11.8 (0.46)	6.7 (0.26)	726.0 (28.58)
Average precipitation days (≥ 0.1 mm)	2.1	1.5	1.7	2.4	6.1	14.2	18.3	17.0	12.9	5.9	2.0	1.6	85.7
Source: Servicio Meteorologico Nacional (normals 1951–2010, extremes 1951–2022)

=== Cityscape ===
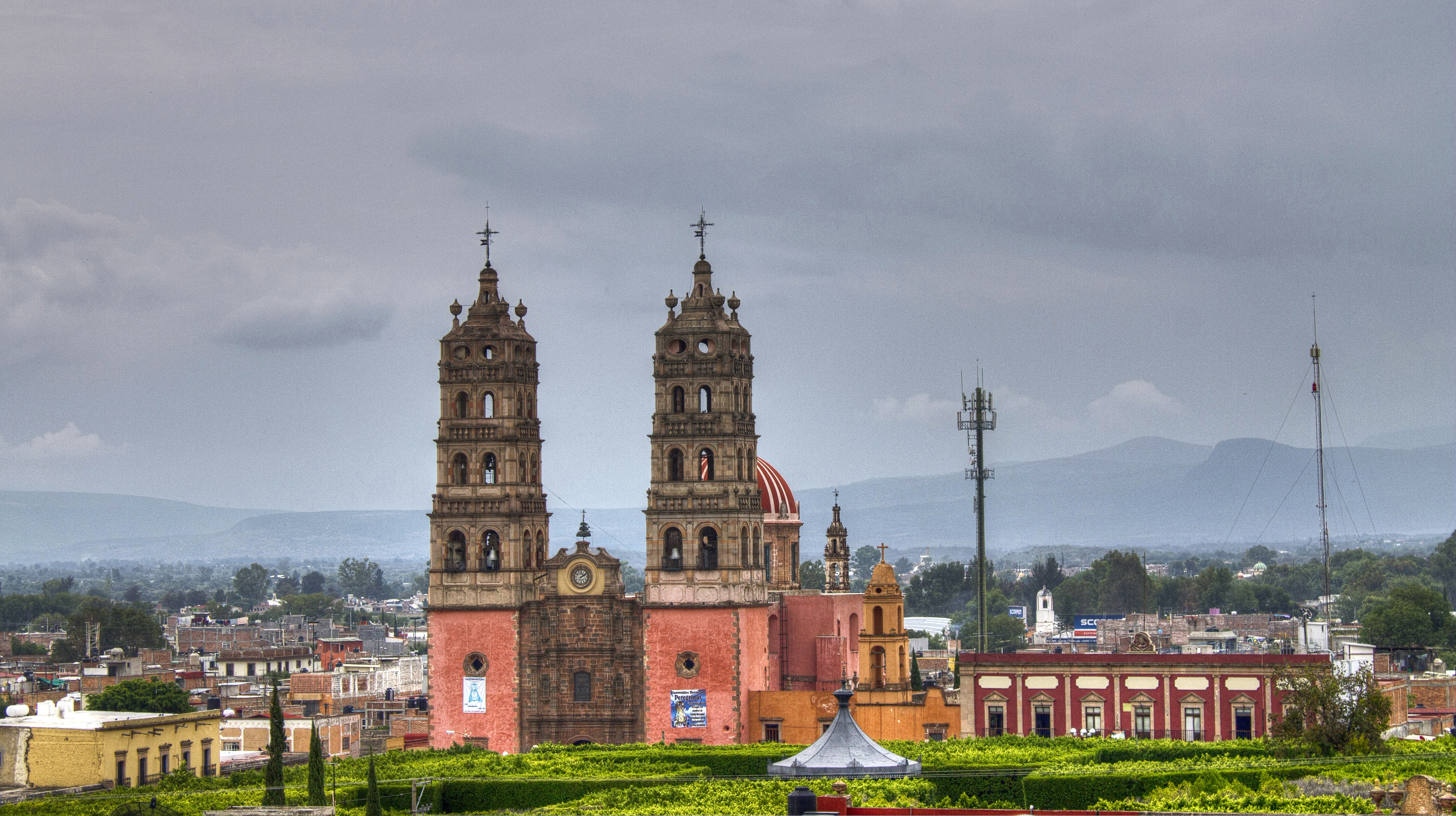
View of Parroquia Nuestra Señora de la Luz and the surrounding area

=== Microregions ===
Name	Population
Urireo	8,679
San Nicolás de los Agustinos	7,148
San Pedro de los Naranjos	4,494
El Sabino	4,095
Maravatío del Encinal	3,262
Cupareo	1,982
Santo Tomás Huatzindeo	1,950
Ojo de Agua de Ballesteros	1,633
San Miguel Eménguaro	1,526
La Luz	1,335
La Estancia de San José del Carmen	1,252
El Capulín	1,249
San Pablo Pejo	1,227
El Salvador (Ranchito San José del Carmen)	1,205
La Quemada	1,123
San Antonio Eménguaro	1,061
Puerta del Monte	970
La Estancia del Carmen de Maravatio (short name El Carmen) or (La Estancia)-- contrary to its name it belongs to Salvatierra	913
San José del Carmen	882
San Isidro	814
Gervacio Mendoza	759
La Palma de Eménguaro	757
La Virgen	745
La Magdalena	460
La Esquina	264
San Miguel el Alto	40

== Economy ==
Historically the economy was heavily agrarian, but currently is concentrated in the commercial sector, to the detriment of agricultural activity, which has specialized and focused on production that gets exported out the municipality. The commercial sector compromises 50.4% of the economy, followed by temporary accommodation and food and beverage preparation at 13.3%, "other services except government activities" which lists barbers, mechanics, repairman among other trades, at 12%, and the manufacturing industry, especially the textile industry follows at 9.19%.

== Culture ==
The city is host to many festivals including the Fiesta de la Candalaria, between January 26 – February 9, which February 9 also coincides with the City's anniversary of foundation. In the month of May the Fiesta de la Virgen de la Luz es held. Fiesta de San Antonio de Padua is held on June 13. July 16 Fiesta de la Virgen del Carmen, and on November 20 the Feast of La Virgen del Rosario.

Since 2007, Salvatierra recognized the bullfighting culture of its history, and taking advantage of the tricentennial of the Marquesado of this land, created a festivity with the name of the "Marquesada", which has as its main attraction the running of the bulls in the Pamplona style, remembering the salvaterrense bullfighting tradition, since in the current colony of La Esperanza the first bullfight was held in honor of the independence of Mexico, signed by the sixth Marquis of Salvatierra.

== Crime ==
Three municipal employees, Mario Francisco Solano Muñoz, Hector Méndoza Beltrán, and Isaac Puente, were gunned down in their car on March 25, 2019. No arrests have been made. As of July 2022 the highest percentage of crime is theft with 184 cases reported in the year of 2022 and in between July 2021 and July 2022 the crime with the highest percentage increase is homicide at a 550% increase with 15 reported on December 17, 2023, armed gunned men tried to enter a private Christmas party and were turned down. Moments later the gunned men returned and opened fire killing 12 individuals and injuring 25 which has been called the 2023 Salvatierra massacre. These crimes are consistent with previous crimes in the area where 2 enemy cartels battle for drug turf.

== Sister cities ==
- Huamantla, Mexico
- (United States) Irwindale, California, USA
- Medina Sidonia, Spain
- Comares, Spain
- Zalamea de la Serena, Spain

== See also ==
- Battle of Salvatierra, 1813
