= Carlos Sada =

Mexican diplomat (1952–2023)

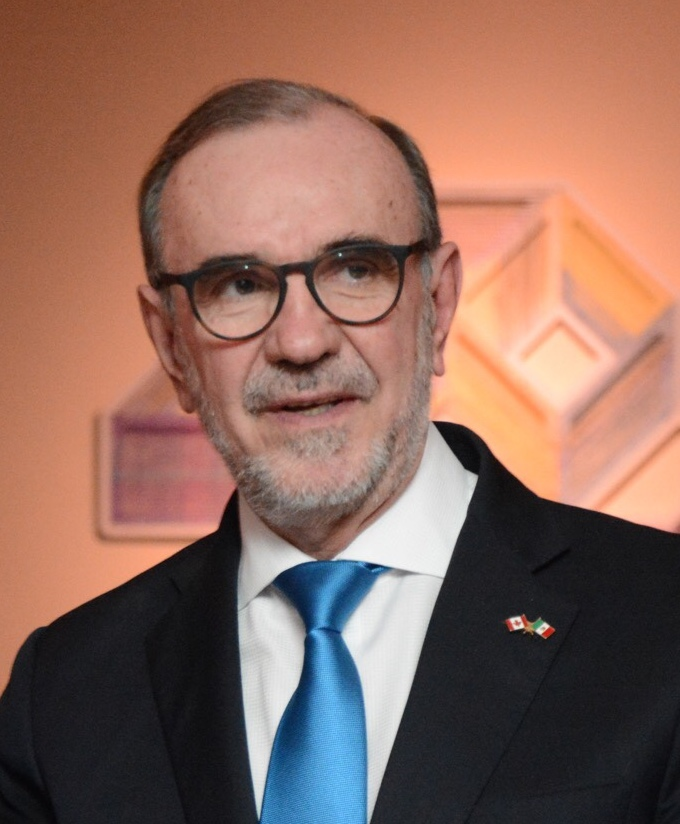
Carlos Sada (2018)

Carlos Manuel Sada Solana (15 August 1952 – 8 June 2023) was a Mexican politician and diplomat. He was ambassador to the United States from 2016 to 2017. Sada died on 8 June 2023, at the age of 70.
