= Héctor Benavides =

Mexican journalist (1941–2023)

- Benavides circa 2020
- Born: Jesús Héctor Benavides Fernández; 12 January 1941; Monterrey, Nuevo León, Mexico
- Died: 13 November 2023 (aged 82); Monterrey, Nuevo León, Mexico
- Education: Autonomous University of Nuevo León
- Occupation: Journalist

Jesús Héctor Benavides Fernández (12 January 1941 – 13 November 2023), also known as Arquitecto Benavides, was a Mexican news anchor and radio personality whose journalistic career spanned over six decades in radio and 58 years on television, particularly in northeastern Mexico.

Shortly before his death he set two Guinness World Records: "longest career as a television news broadcaster (male)" and "longest career as a television news broadcaster (same programme)".

== Biography ==
Benavides was born in Monterrey and received a bachelor's degree in architecture from the Autonomous University of Nuevo León (UANL, 1964).

Benavides died in Monterrey on 13 November 2023, at the age of 82.

== Books ==
- Monterrey: Ciudad noticia (1976)
- Los cuervos y la paloma (1979)
- El habla popular en Monterrey (1994)
- 45 años... Mi vida en radio y televisión (2005)
- 50 años en el mundo de la noticia (2010)
- La sexta pantalla (2012)
- Huracán Gilberto: 25 años después (2013)
- 45 años, 45 historias (2013)
- El hombre en la Luna: 50 Aniversario (2019)
- Casi 82 años... Archivo de un reportero (2022).
