= Hans Friessen =

Mexican footballer (1949–2023)

Personal information
- Full name: Hans Peter Friessen Wutteke
- Date of birth: 10 September 1949
- Place of birth: Guadalajara, Jalisco, Mexico
- Date of death: 21 October 2023 (aged 74)
- Position(s): Forward

Senior career*
Years	Team	Apps	(Gls)
1968–1972	Atlas		
1971–1974	Guadalajara		(10)
1974	Tecos		
- *Club domestic league appearances and goals

Hans Peter Friessen Wutteke (Note: In this Spanish name, the first or paternal surname is Friessen and the second or maternal family name is Wutteke.) (10 September 1949 – 21 October 2023) was a Mexican professional footballer who played as a forward for various football clubs in the late 1960s and 1970s.

== Career ==
Born in Guadalajara, Friessen played in the early 1970s with Atlas as a forward debuting only two games, later on he made the transfer to Chivas de Guadalajara. As Chivas had a history of only contracting Mexican players, the club's supporters questioned Friessen's inclusion in the club due to his German ancestry and surname.

For the 1973–74 season, Friessen was transferred to Tecos UAG, who were playing in the Second Division, and became league champions with them, earning the promotion to the Primera División. Halfway through the 1970s, Friessen's parents considered and decided that football was not their son's future thus the early retirement of Friessen.

== Personal life and death ==
Friessen was born in Mexico to Mexican-born parents of German descent. Friessen received the nickname El Güerito due to his blonde hair.

Hans Friessen died on 21 October 2023, at the age of 74.

== Honours ==
Tecos

- Segunda División Profesional: 1974–75
