= Alberto Ruz Buenfil =

Mexican writer and activist (1945–2023)

Alberto Ruz Buenfil (11 September 1945 – 7 December 2023) was a Mexican writer and activist whose work is dedicated to social change, environmental sustainability, and the performing arts. He co-founded two international theater groups as well as Mexico's first ecovillage, known as Huehuecoyotl. He led the 13-year Rainbow Peace Caravan, an international effort to promote sustainable design and permaculture, as well as theatrical performances, across seventeen countries of Latin America. He was also funded by Ashoka from 2002 to 2005, and received in the name of the Rainbow Peace Caravan, the prize "Escuela Viva" from the Brazilian President Lula da Silva and Minister of Culture Gilberto Gil, as one of the 60 most advanced projects in education in the country.

Ruz was the author of several books. At his return in 2009 from South America, he was invited to be part of a team at the 'Direction of Culture' of Coyoacán, México DF, where he created the project Ecobarrios and took it for three years to 10 different pueblos and barrios from that part of the city. From January to November 2013 he was Director of Environmental Culture in the state of Morelos. Beginning in 2014, he was an adviser to the "Asamblea Legislativa", from Mexico City, on the subject of the recently adopted Law of Rights of Mother Earth. He organized the 1st Global Forum for the Rights of Mother Earth in Mexico city, from 1 to 5 June. His main purpose was to contribute to the Universal Declaration of Rights of Mother Earth at the United Nations. He lived in Huehuecóyotl and traveled around the world as a keynote speaker in different forums and for all kinds of audiences.

== Early life ==
Alberto Ruz Buenfil grew up in Yucatán with his brother Jorge, and was the son of archaeologist Alberto Ruz Lhuillier, best known for his discovery of the subterranean tomb of Pakal the Great in the Mayan ruins of Palenque in 1952, and Blanca Buenfil, an outstanding woman from Campeche. He attended junior high school at Liceo Franco-Mexicano, and high school at "Preparatoria 5", in Mexico city.

== Education and career ==
Alberto Ruz earned a degree in education at the Instituto Francés de América Latina through the University of Paris. He taught courses in French language and culture at the Universidad Nacional Autónoma de México (UNAM) from 1964 to 1966. He briefly served on the Faculty of Chemistry there in 1964 and was subsequently in the Faculties of Economical and Political Sciences (1965–1968).

Ruz Buenfil studied Contemporary Arts at the Bauhaus Situationiste of Drakabygget, in Orkelljunga, Sweden, (1970–71), as well as organic agriculture at the Moshav Yodfat, Israel (1971–72), and Comparative Religions at the Theosophical Society headquarters in Adyar, Madras (now Chennai), India (1974–75). He was fluent in Spanish, French, English, Portuguese and Italian.

== Activism and performance ==
As a young adult, inspired by the Cuban revolution, Alberto Ruz joined the anti-war movement in response to the Vietnam War, consequently traveling to the United States and exploring social change movements such as those promoted by the Black Panthers, Ernest Callenbach's Ecotopians and Chicano leaders of the time. He adopted a nomadic lifestyle that led him to Sweden, Israel, and India, where he studied international communities and permaculture (see Education above). In India, he co-founded international theater groups Hathi Babas and then The Illuminated Elephants Traveling Gypsy Theatre. The Illuminated Elephants traveled throughout the U.S., Guatemala, and Mexico seeking to entertain and inspire their audiences with a message of peace and sustainability in the context of green politics.

== Huehuecoyotl ==
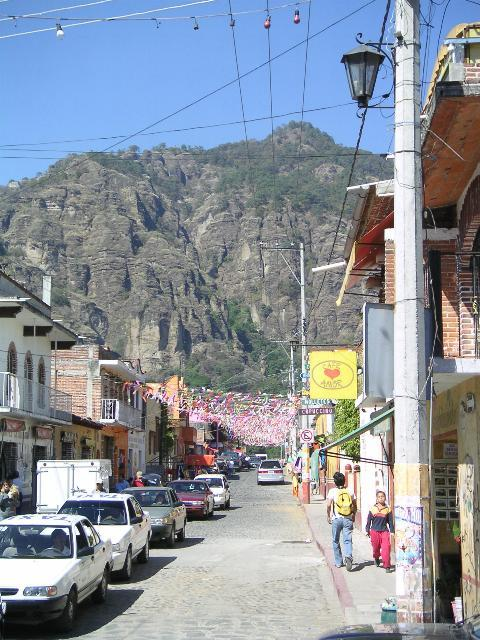
Tepoztlán, Morelos, Mexico

After performing abroad for several years, Ruz returned to Mexico in 1982 with members of The Illuminated Elephants and founded Mexico's first ecovillage, named Huehuecoyotl named for an Aztec deity whose name in Nahuatl means "very old coyote". The village is situated on five acres (2 ha) in the mountains of Tepoztlán, Morelos. The community, with about twenty members, is based on sustainable design principles and offers educational and cultural programs throughout the year.

== Rainbow Caravan for Peace ==
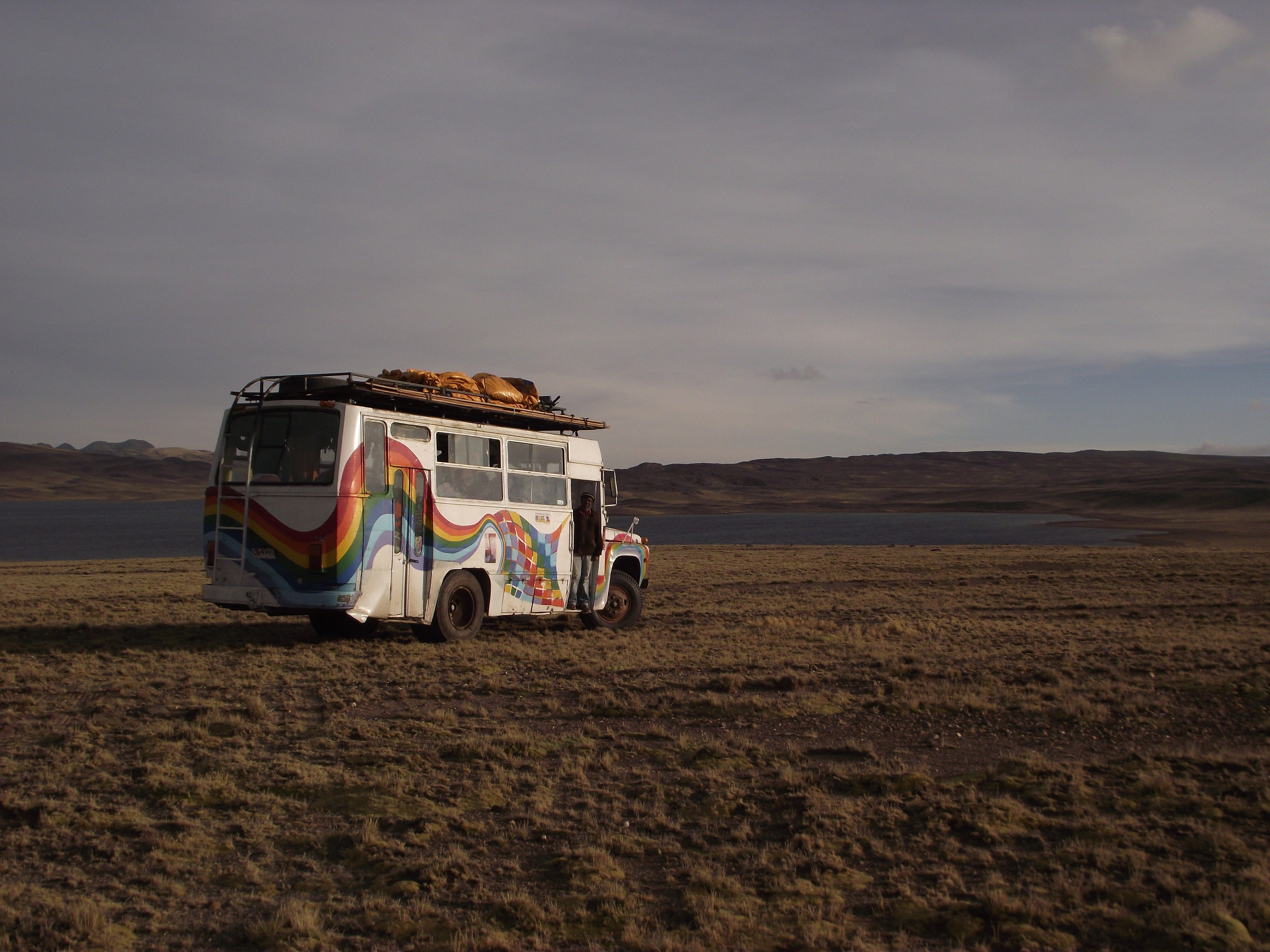
Rainbow Peace Caravan in Peru

In 1996 Ruz founded Rainbow Caravan for Peace, a group of twenty or so rotating travelers dedicated to spreading the lessons gleaned from Huehuecoyotl. They stopped in Chiapas for an exchange with the Zapatistas, where Ruz was inspired to take his moniker Subcoyote Alberto Ruz, after a leading Zapatista, Subcomandante Marcos. The caravan traveled all the way to Peru, where in 2003 they were the primary host in the international gathering and ecovillage called The Call of the Condor. The group received an invitation from the Minister of Culture Gilberto Gil to travel through the country giving lessons on sustainable living. In 2004, Ruz described the work on the group in a particular desert region of South America (cite) as, among other projects, "intensive two-day workshops on permaculture, consensus decision making, appropriate technology for desert regions, ecovillage living and design, and an introduction to the Mayan calendar of 13 moons".

The Caravan subsequently journeyed through the Amazon for the next four years. Ruz finally returned to Mexico in 2009 and joined the staff at the 'Casa de Cultura Jesús Reyes Heroles' in Mexico City at the invitation of Mexican bestselling author Laura Esquivel. The organization is located in a historic neighborhood of Coyoacán, where Ruz created the program 'Ecobarrios' in ten different marginal barrios, to form groups of eco-promoters to work in their own communities.

=== Later activities ===
After three years in Mexico City, in 2012 Ruz Buenfil went back to the state of Morelos, site of the ecovillage Huehuecóyotl, and was immediately invited to take part in a recently created Secretaría de Desarrollo Sustentable ("Secretariat of Sustainable Development"), as 'Director of Culture and Environment.' He worked for a year at an office located in the Ecological Park of Chapultepec in Cuernavaca, and at the end of the year he resigned to become an adviser to the "Legislative Assembly" in Mexico city, to promote the Law of Rights of Mother Earth in Mexico and abroad at international forums.

In 2016, Ruz Buenfil organized the 1st Global Forum for the Rights of Mother Earth in Mexico City, from 1 to 5 June. This event consisted of a three-day multidisciplinary session with keynote conferences by Leonardo Boff, Vandana Shiva, Ati Quigua, Swami Paramadvaiti, Esperanza Martínez, Natalie Greene, Mumta Ito, and another dozen renowned activists, scientists and academicians, from more than 20 different countries. On 4 June, the Forum produced the Pachamama Fest, a 14-hour concert with 16 different musical groups from Mexico, Colombia, Venezuela, Chile and Argentina and on the 5th, International Day of Environment, with the mounting of a Temporary Peace Village in Parque México, in which 120 different social and environmental organizations participated, and more than 10,000 people assisted, in a display of dozens of alternatives for a more sustainable lifestyle.

Ruz Buenfil was presented in this event of the "Koseny Communitarian award" from the Fellowship of Intentional Community for a long life dedicated to promoting cooperative and sustainable living in Mexico and the rest of the world.

On 7 July, a proposed law adopting the rights of Earth as a living being was presented at the Commission charged to create the new Constitution of Mexico city, and on 8 August, the results of the forum and the new proposed law were presented at the Senate of the Republic in Mexico city, to be adopted officially.

Ruz Buenfil was father to Odin Ruz Hansberg, permaculturist, living in Tepoztlán with his family and developing "Project Oztopulco", a new permacultural ecovillage near Huehuecoyotl, México; Mayura Ruz Hansberg, architect, living in Tepoztlán with her family; Ixchel Ruz Comneno, Environmental Anthropologist living with her husband in Grondona, Italy; and Solkin Ruz Ondategui, TV and theater actor, living in México city. Ruz was grandfather to six grandchildren, Arun Ruz, musician, artist and student of Permaculture at the University Fray Luca Paccioli in Cuernavaca; Sebastián, Amaya, Ilan, Nayelli and Ezra, living in Tepoztlán, Morelos in Mexico. Ruz was also actually married to Verónica Sacta Campos, originally from Ecuador, a woman dedicated to the preservation of her Andean culture and other indigenous traditions from the Americas.

Ruz Buenfil died on 7 December 2023, at the age of 78.

== Books and communications ==
- Arcobaleno, popolo Senza Confini (Rainbow, a nation without borders,) edited by Amm Terra Nova, Firenze, Italy, 1988
- Rainbow Nation without Borders: Toward an Ecotopian Millennium, edited by Bear & Co. New Mexico, 1989. Testimonies from post-World War II alternative movements
- Guerreros del Arcoíris (The Rainbow Warriors) edited by Círculo Cuadrado, México 1991
- La Leyenda del Cuarto Mago (The Legend of the Fourth Magicien) edited by Arcoruedas-publishers, Medellín, Colombia, 2001
- Hay Tantos Caminos (So Many Roads) edited by, Colofon, Mexico, 2004, and by Arcoruedas-publishers in Argentina in 2005
- Huehuecoyotl, Raices al Viento -(The story of a 30 years ecovillage) Co-editor and co-author, México 2012
- Co-creator of Mexico's first network of environmental groups, ('Arcoredes,' a network of Eco-communications)
- Originator and main inspiring force behind the Vision Councils in México and South America since 1991, national and international gatherings from Earth Keepers
- Co-creator of the Multimedia Documentation Center "Produvisiones Arcoiris," 1981
- Editor of several magazines: El Viejo Coyote, Arcoredes, Voces de Huehuecoyotl, and Arcoruedas(1982–2004)
- Actor in the film "Cocoré", from Brazilian director Tullio Marquez, Belo Horizonte, Brazil, 2006
- Actor in the film "Dreaming with Tulum", (an homage to Federico Fellini,) by Tiahoga Ruge, México 2011
- Keynote speaker of the documentary "Pachamama, a Manifesto for the Earth", by Thomas Torelli, Italy, 2016
