= Montserrat Galí Boadella =

Mexican art historian (1947–2023)

Montserrat Galí Boadella (29 January 1947 – 30 August 2023) was a Mexican art historian. She was trained in philosophy, literature, and art history at universities in Barcelona and Zagreb, as well as at the National Autonomous University of Mexico (UNAM), where she obtained her doctorate. Her work focused on investigating the relationship between art and society. She also served as director of UNAM's Museo Universitario del Chopo and as undersecretary of culture in the state of Puebla.

== Early life and education ==
Montserrat Galí Boadella was born in Mexico City in 1947. Her parents were Catalan exiles who came to Mexico due to the Spanish Civil War; her father was the writer Raimon Galí. She went to Spain to study, with the intention of returning to Mexico. From age 16, she began teaching music classes, having studied guitar at Barcelona's Conservatori Superior de Música del Liceu. Later in life, she focused on playing the baroque flute.

For her bachelor's thesis at the University of Barcelona, she decided to work on a Mexican theme, as she planned to return to her home country, so she focused on the paintings of Pedro García Ferrer in the Puebla Cathedral. She then traveled to Germany to continue her studies in music; this experience would allow her to later teach classes at a German international school in Bolivia.

In 1972, she arrived in Croatia, where she pursued a master's degree in visual communication. After receiving her master's and spending two years living in Bolivia, and in anticipation of the procedures necessary for her husband to pursue postgraduate studies in Mexico, Galí returned to her native country. She later obtained a doctorate at UNAM, where she examined the arrival of Romanticism in Mexico.

== Career ==
Galí taught at UNAM, the Universidad Iberoamericana, and the National School of Anthropology and History. At the latter, she led the Department of Publications and Cultural Diffusion. In 1981, she founded the Anthropological Photography Prize. From 1989 to 1994, she served as director of UNAM's Museo Universitario del Chopo, which houses contemporary art.

After ending her tenure at the Museo Universitario del Chopo, she settled in Puebla, where she worked in the history graduate program at the Meritorious Autonomous University of Puebla (BUAP). She also coordinated UNAM's Puebla-based art history graduate program, organizing regular colloquiums on art in the state. Beginning in 1997, she helped create and develop the project "Mexico-France: Memories of a Common Sensibility in the 19th and 20th Centuries," which involved conferences, seminars, colloquiums, and publications. She also worked as part of a national seminar on sacred music, coordinating Puebla's regional contribution.

In 2019, she served as Puebla's undersecretary of culture, a role within the Tourism Department, making her the first woman to lead the state's cultural governance.

In addition to her research at BUAP's Institute of Social Science and Humanities, she was a member of the Sistema Nacional de Investigadores. She was an honorary member of the Mexican Catalan Cultural Association MEXCAT.

Galí died on 30 August 2023, at the age of 76.

== Notable publications ==
- Artistas catalanes en México: siglos XIX y XX (1992)
- Arte y cultura del barroco en Puebla (2000)
- Historias del bello sexo: la introducción del romanticismo en México (2002)
- La pluma y el báculo: Juan de Palafox y el mundo hispano del seiscientos (2004)
- Estampa popular: cultura popular (2007)
