= Cupareo =

Coordinates: 20°14′N 101°01′W

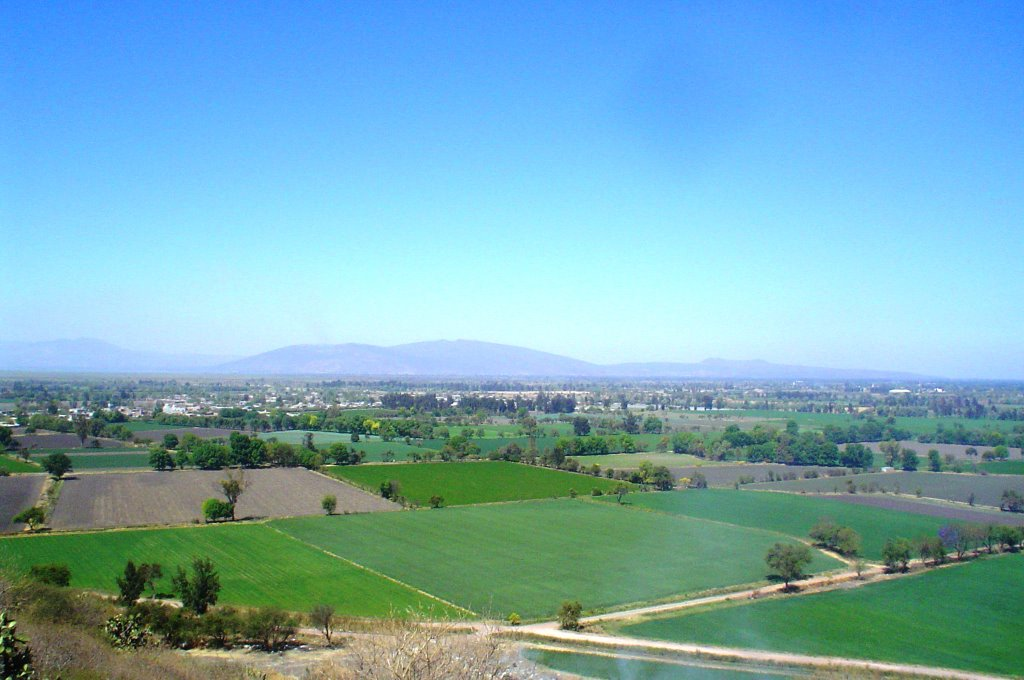
View of Cupareo

Cupareo is a Mexican town in the state of Guanajuato.

== Location ==
Cupareo is located southeast of Lake Yuriria. Nearby cities include Salvatierra, Yuriria, Moroleon, Uriangato, and Celaya. Nearby villages include San Nicolas de Los Agustinos, Puerta del Monte, Casacuaran, Tinaja de Pastores and Santiago Maravatío.

The microregion of Cupareo (which includes the villages of Puerta Del Monte, Betania and Gervasio Mendoza) has a total population of 4,524 according to the 2005 census.

== Economy ==
The economy of Cupareo consists mainly of agriculture and remittances from those who have emigrated to the US.

From the agricultural and environmental point of view, Cupareo faces many problems. Most of the land is irrigated, water is obtained from wells next to land farms. Farmers use gravitational or surface irrigation which is one of the most inefficient methods of irrigation, creating several problems including poor water use efficiency practice, salinization, and contamination. Furthermore, farmers at the end of each harvest, burn the plant residue to prepare for the next crop, thus, soil organic matter is lost from the burn, creating soil erosion, loss of plant nutrients, destroying soil structure, and contamination

== Education ==
Teachers and parents worked hard to establish Cupareo's only middle school, "Juana de Asbaje", which was founded in 1988, as a resource for students to continue their education. Before the existence of the middle school, students had to travel to nearby towns in order to continue their education. As a result, students that were low income only received an elementary education. Today the middle school "Juana de Asbaje" serves to educate students from both Cupareo's and Puerta del Monte communities.
