= 15th federal electoral district of Guanajuato =

Federal electoral district of Mexico

Guanajuato's 15th
- Electoral district of the Chamber of Deputies of Mexico

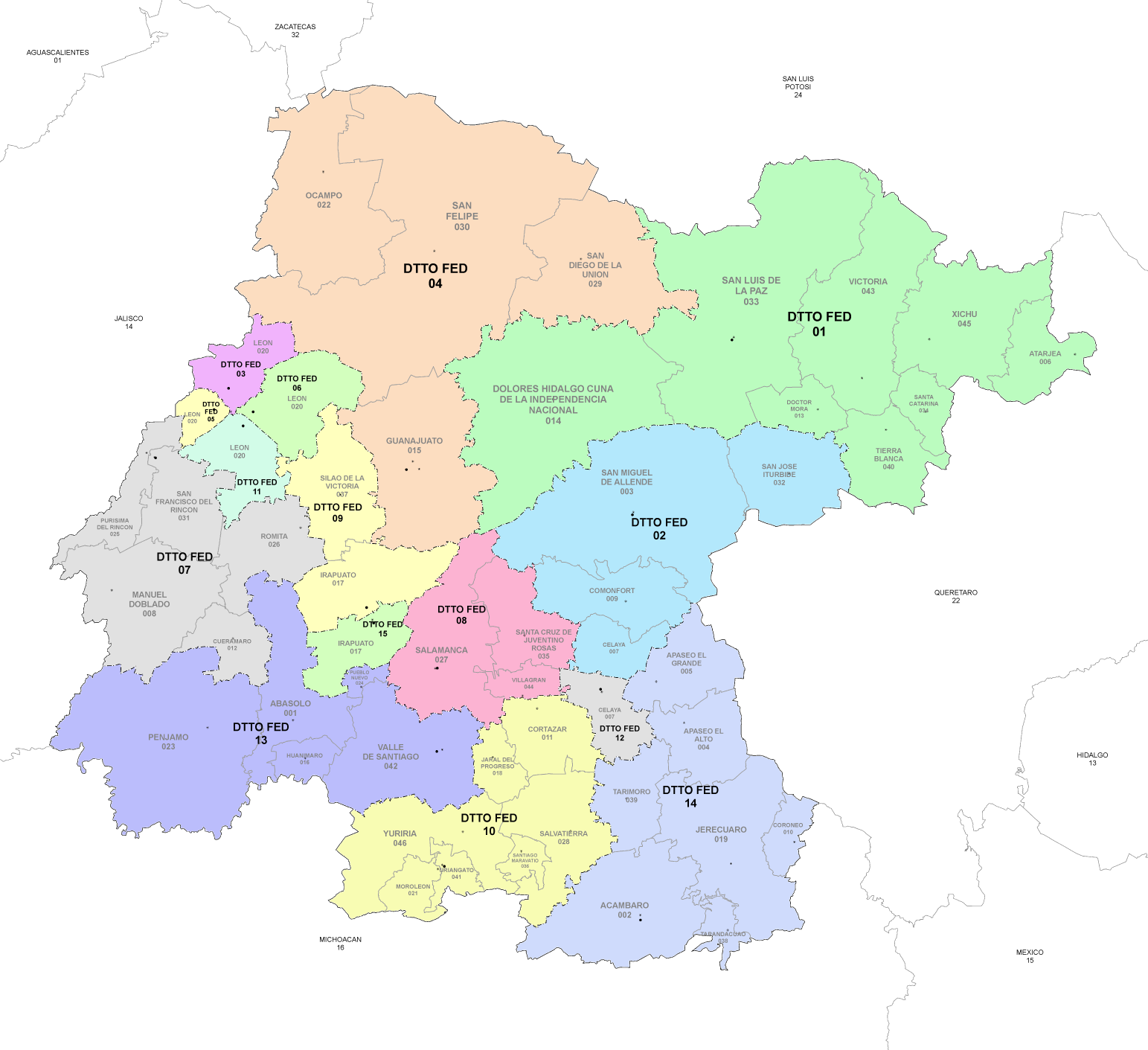
- 15th district since 2023

Incumbent
- Member: José Javier Aguirre
- Party: ▌Morena
- Congress: 66th (2024–2027)

District
- State: Guanajuato
- Head town: Irapuato
- Coordinates: 20°40′N 101°21′W
- Covers: Municipality of Irapuato (part)
- PR region: Second
- Precincts: 172
- Population: 397,300 (2020 census)

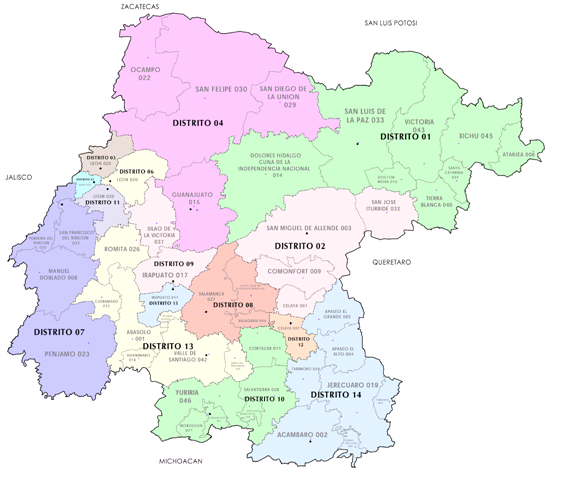
Guanajuato's districts in 2017–2022

The 15th federal electoral district of Guanajuato (Spanish: Distrito electoral federal 15 de Guanajuato) is one of the 300 electoral districts into which Mexico is divided for elections to the federal Chamber of Deputies and one of 15 such districts in the state of Guanajuato.

It elects one deputy to the lower house of Congress for each three-year legislative session by means of the first-past-the-post system. Votes cast in the district also count towards the calculation of proportional representation ("plurinominal") deputies elected from the second region.

Suspended in 1930, (Note: An amendment to Article 52 of the Constitution in 1928 changed the original provision of "one deputy per 60,000 inhabitants" to "one deputy per 100,000"; as a result, the size of the Chamber of Deputies fell from 281 in the 1928 election to 171 in 1934.) Guanajuato's 15th was re-established by the Federal Electoral Institute (IFE) in its 1996 redistricting process. It was then placed in abeyance again between 2005 and 2017 but was restored for the 2018 general election.

The current member for the district, elected in the 2024 general election, is José Javier Aguirre Gallardo of the National Regeneration Movement (Morena).

== District territory ==
Under the 2023 districting plan adopted by the National Electoral Institute (INE), which is to be used for the 2024, 2027 and 2030 federal elections, the 15th district is located in the centre of Guanajuato and covers 172 electoral precincts (secciones electorales) in the south of the municipality of Irapuato.

The head town (cabecera distrital), where results from individual polling stations are gathered together and tallied, is the city of Irapuato. The district reported a population of 397,300 in the 2020 census.

== Previous districting schemes ==
Evolution of electoral district numbers
	1974	1978	1996	2005	2017	2023
Guanajuato	9	13	15	14	15	15
Chamber of Deputies	196	300				

2017–2022

Between 2017 and 2022, the 15th district's head town was at Irapuato and it covered the bulk of the municipality (179 precincts in the south). (Note: The remainder of the municipality (70 precincts) was assigned to the 9th district.)

2005–2017

Under the 2005 plan, Guanajuato was assigned only 14 districts.

1996–2005

The 1996 scheme increased Guanajuato's allocation from 13 to 15 seats. The new 15th district had its head town at Salvatierra and it comprised five municipalities in the south of the state:
- Salvatierra, Moroleón, Santiago Maravatío, Uriangato and Yuriria.

== Deputies returned to Congress ==
(Mexico) National parties
- Current
- PAN
- PRI
- PT
- PVEM
- MC
- Morena
- PAZ
- Somos
- Defunct or local only
- PLM
- PNR
- PRM
- PNM
- PP
- PPS
- PARM
- PFCRN
- CON
- PANAL
- PSD
- PES
- PES
- PRD

Guanajuato's 15th district
Election	Deputy	Party	Term	Legislature
1916	Gilberto M. Navarro		1916–1917	Constituent Congress of Querétaro
...
The 15th district was suspended between 1930 and 1997
1997	Gerardo Sánchez García	Institutional Revolutionary Party	1997–2000	57th Congress
2000	Ramón Paniagua Jiménez	National Action Party (Mexico)	2000–2003	58th Congress
2003	Miguel Ángel Rangel	National Action Party (Mexico)	2003–2006	59th Congress
The 15th district was suspended between 2006 and 2018
2018	Sergio Fernando Ascencio Barba	National Action Party (Mexico)	2018–2021	64th Congress
2021	Itzel Josefina Balderas Hernández	National Action Party (Mexico)	2021–2024	65th Congress
2024	José Javier Aguirre Gallardo	National Regeneration Movement	2024–2027	66th Congress

== Presidential elections ==
Guanajuato's 15th district
Election	District won by	Party or coalition	%
2018	Andrés Manuel López Obrador	Juntos Haremos Historia	34.9655
2024	Claudia Sheinbaum Pardo	Sigamos Haciendo Historia	52.4819
