= 12th federal electoral district of Guanajuato =

Federal electoral district of Mexico

Guanajuato's 12th
- Electoral district of the Chamber of Deputies of Mexico

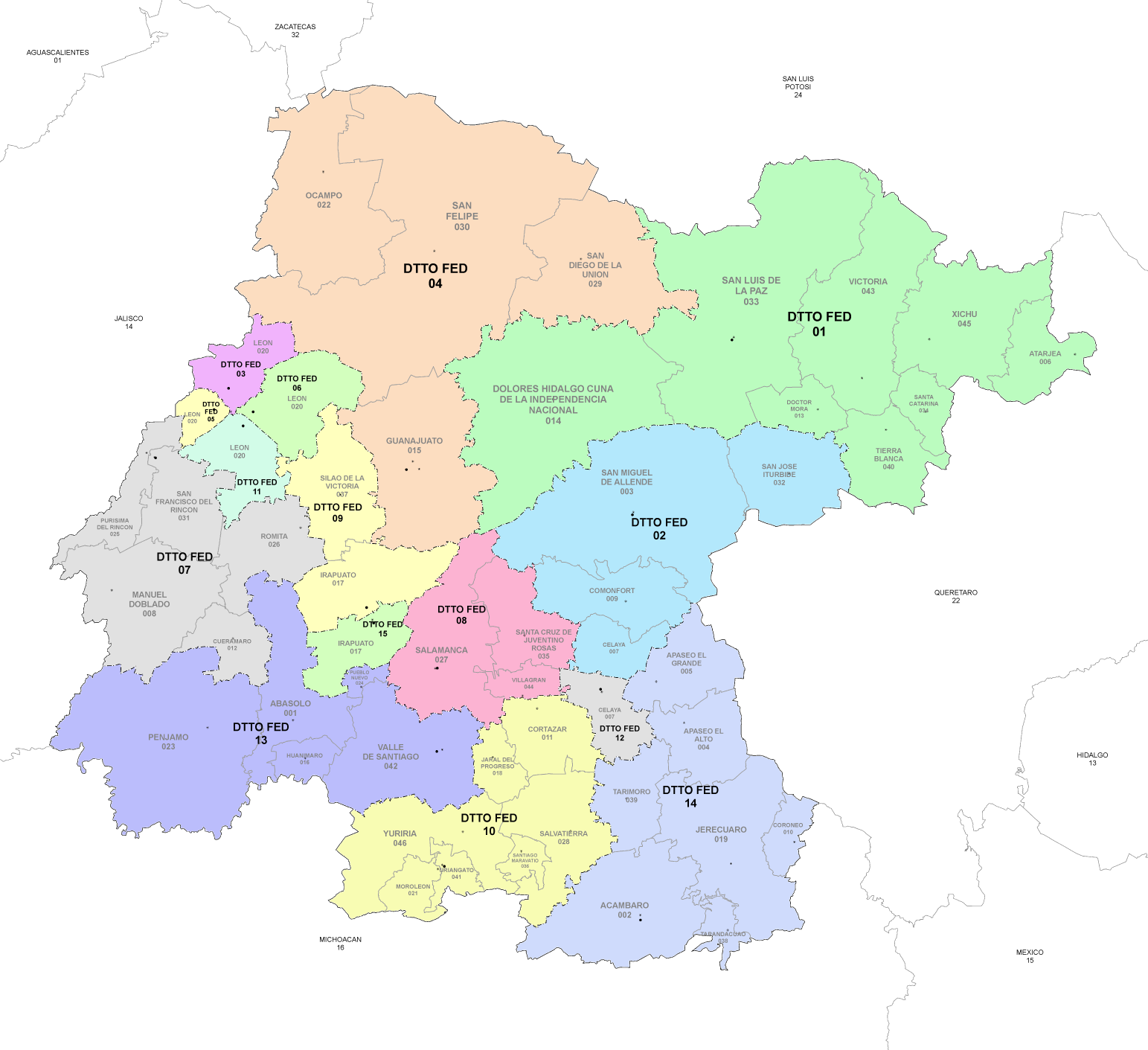
- 12th district since 2023

Incumbent
- Member: Magdalena Rosales Cruz
- Party: ▌Morena
- Congress: 66th (2024–2027)

District
- State: Guanajuato
- Head town: Celaya
- Coordinates: 20°31′N 100°49′W
- Covers: Municipality of Celaya (part)
- PR region: Second
- Precincts: 216
- Population: 432,575 (2020 census)

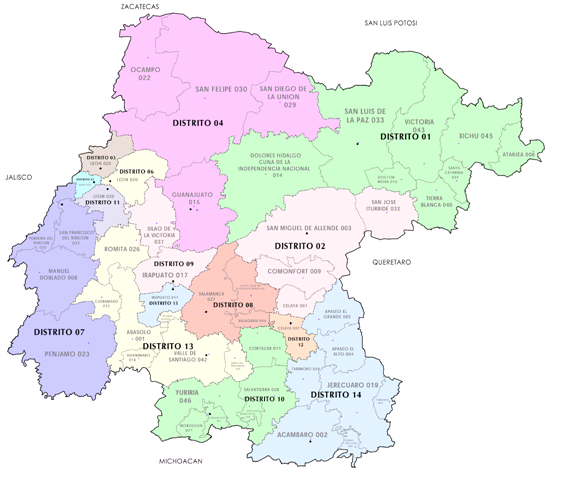
Guanajuato's districts in 2017–2022

The 12th federal electoral district of Guanajuato (Spanish: Distrito electoral federal 12 de Guanajuato) is one of the 300 electoral districts into which Mexico is divided for elections to the federal Chamber of Deputies and one of 15 such districts in the state of Guanajuato.

It elects one deputy to the lower house of Congress for each three-year legislative session by means of the first-past-the-post system. Votes cast in the district also count towards the calculation of proportional representation ("plurinominal") deputies elected from the second region.

Suspended in 1930, (Note: An amendment to Article 52 of the Constitution in 1928 changed the original provision of "one deputy per 60,000 inhabitants" to "one deputy per 100,000"; as a result, the size of the Chamber of Deputies fell from 281 in the 1928 election to 171 in 1934.) Guanajuato's 12th was re-established as part of the 1977 political reforms. The restored district returned its first deputy in the 1979 mid-term election.

The current member for the district, elected in the 2024 general election, is María Magdalena Rosales Cruz of the National Regeneration Movement (Morena).

== District territory ==
Under the 2023 districting plan adopted by the National Electoral Institute (INE), which is to be used for the 2024, 2027 and 2030 federal elections, Guanajuato's 12th district covers 216 electoral precincts (secciones electorales) in the municipality of Celaya. (Note: The remainder of Celaya – 32 precincts – is assigned to the 2nd district.)

The head town (cabecera distrital), where results from individual polling stations are gathered together and tallied, is the city of Celaya. The district reported a population of 432,575 in the 2020 census.

== Previous districting schemes ==
Evolution of electoral district numbers
	1974	1978	1996	2005	2017	2023
Guanajuato	9	13	15	14	15	15
Chamber of Deputies	196	300				

2017–2022

Between 2017 and 2022, the 12th district had the same configuration as in the 2023 plan.

2005–2017

Under the 2005 plan, Guanajuato had only 14 districts. This district's head town was at Celaya and it covered 188 precincts in the north and south-east of the municipality. (Note: In 2005–2017, the 13th district covered the remainder of Celaya.)

1996–2005

In the 1996 scheme, under which Guanajuato was assigned 15 seats, the district had its head town at Celaya and it comprised the whole of the municipality.

1978–1996

The districting scheme in force from 1978 to 1996 was the result of the 1977 electoral reforms, which increased the number of single-member seats in the Chamber of Deputies from 196 to 300. Under that plan, Guanajuato's seat allocation rose from 9 to 13. The new 12th district covered five municipalities in the south of the state:
- Moroleón, Santiago Maravatío, Uriangato, Valle de Santiago (head town) and Yuriria.

== Deputies returned to Congress ==
(Mexico) National parties
- Current
- PAN
- PRI
- PT
- PVEM
- MC
- Morena
- PAZ
- Somos
- Defunct or local only
- PLM
- PNR
- PRM
- PNM
- PP
- PPS
- PARM
- PFCRN
- CON
- PANAL
- PSD
- PES
- PES
- PRD

Guanajuato's 12th district
Election	Deputy	Party	Term	Legislature
1916	Alfredo Robles Domínguez; Francisco Díaz Barriga		1916–1917	Constituent Congress of Querétaro
...
The 12th district was suspended between 1930 and 1979
1979	Raúl Moreno Mújica	Institutional Revolutionary Party	1979–1982	51st Congress
1982	Sergio Lara Espinoza	Institutional Revolutionary Party	1982–1985	52nd Congress
1985	Mario Murillo Morales	Institutional Revolutionary Party	1985–1988	53rd Congress
1988	Jorge García Henaine	Institutional Revolutionary Party	1988–1991	54th Congress
1991	José Guadalupe Enríquez Magaña	Institutional Revolutionary Party	1991–1994	55th Congress
1994	Lorenzo Chávez Zavala	Institutional Revolutionary Party	1994–1997	56th Congress
1997	José de Jesús Torres León	National Action Party (Mexico)	1997–2000	57th Congress
2000	Javier Bernardo Usabiaga Arroyo (Note: Usabiaga Arroyo resigned his seat on 28 November 2000 to take office as the federal secretary of agriculture. He was replaced for the remainder of his term by his alternate, Rivera Carranza.); José Rivera Carranza	National Action Party (Mexico)	2000–2003	58th Congress
2003	Elizabeth Oswelia Yáñez Robles	National Action Party (Mexico)	2003–2006	59th Congress
2006	Rubí Laura López Silva	National Action Party (Mexico)	2006–2009	60th Congress
2009	Martín Rico Jiménez	National Action Party (Mexico)	2009–2012	61st Congress
2012	Felipe Arturo Camarena García	Ecologist Green Party of Mexico	2012–2015	62nd Congress
2015	Adriana Elizarraraz Sandoval	National Action Party (Mexico)	2015–2018	63rd Congress
2018	Sarai Núñez Cerón	National Action Party (Mexico)	2018–2021	64th Congress
2021	Sarai Núñez Cerón	National Action Party (Mexico)	2021–2024	65th Congress
2024	María Magdalena Rosales Cruz	National Regeneration Movement	2024–2027	66th Congress

== Presidential elections ==
Guanajuato's 12th district
Election	District won by	Party or coalition	%
2018	Ricardo Anaya Cortés	Por México al Frente	37.8823
2024	Claudia Sheinbaum Pardo	Sigamos Haciendo Historia	48.8831
