= 10th federal electoral district of Guanajuato =

Federal electoral district of Mexico

Guanajuato's 10th
- Electoral district of the Chamber of Deputies of Mexico

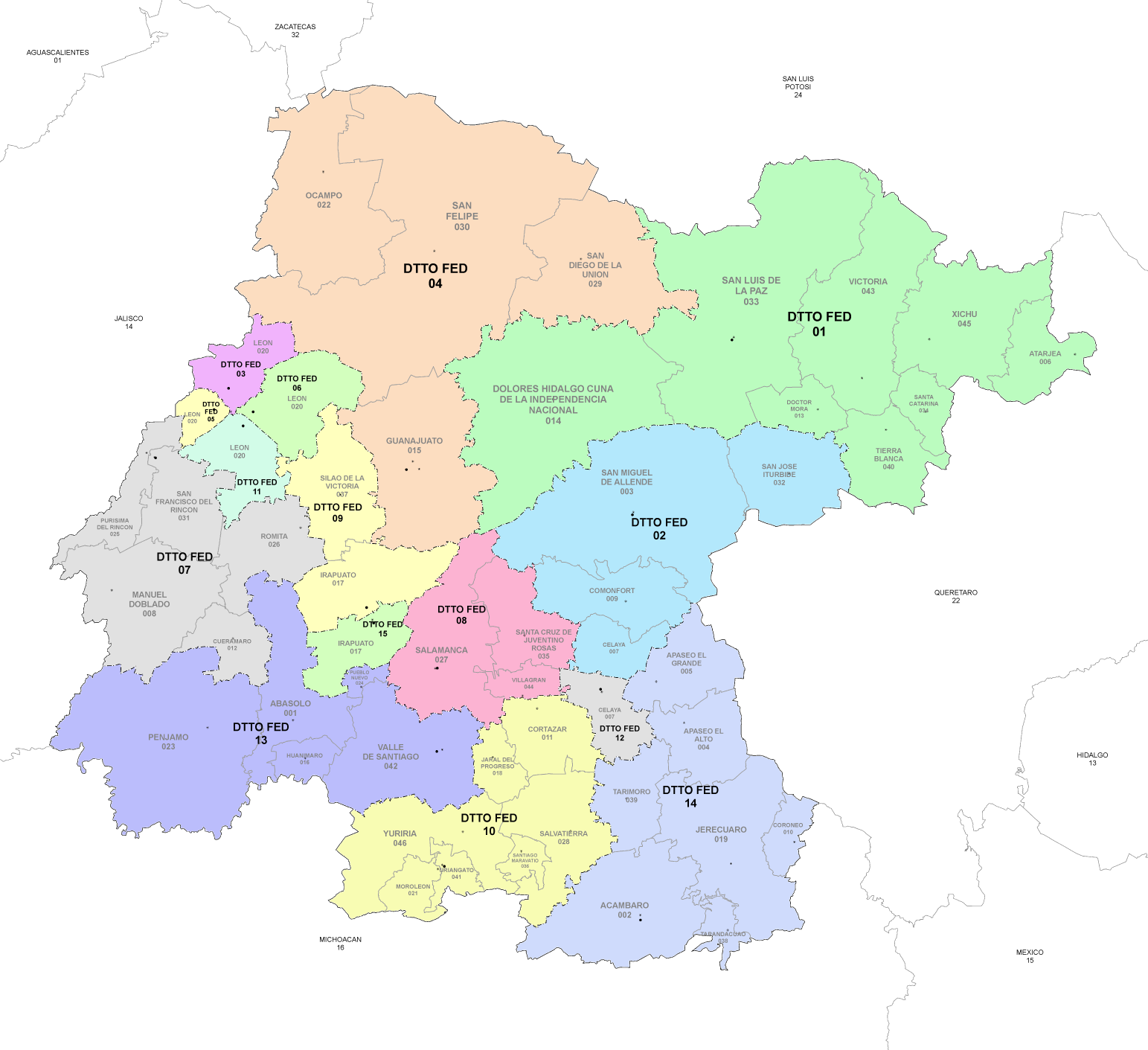
- 10th district since 2023

Incumbent
- Member: Alejandro Calderón Díaz
- Party: ▌Morena
- Congress: 66th (2024–2027)

District
- State: Guanajuato
- Head town: Uriangato
- Coordinates: 20°09′N 101°11′W
- Covers: 7 municipalities: Cortazar, Jaral del Progreso, Moroleón, Salvatierra, Santiago Maravatío, Uriangato, Yuriria
- PR region: Second
- Precincts: 293
- Population: 415,258 (2020 census)

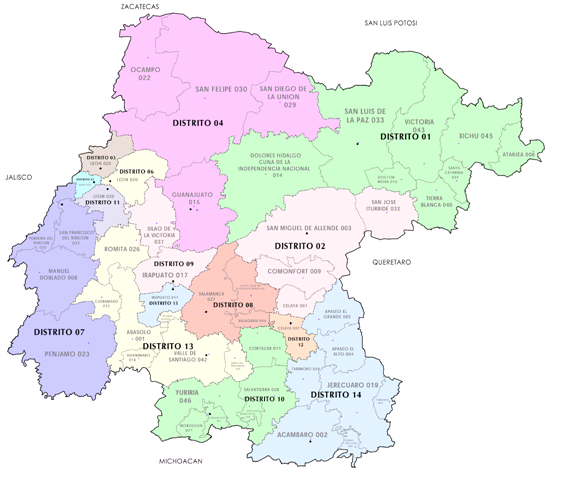
Guanajuato's districts in 2017–2022

The 10th federal electoral district of Guanajuato (Spanish: Distrito electoral federal 10 de Guanajuato) is one of the 300 electoral districts into which Mexico is divided for elections to the federal Chamber of Deputies and one of 15 such districts in the state of Guanajuato.

It elects one deputy to the lower house of Congress for each three-year legislative session by means of the first-past-the-post system. Votes cast in the district also count towards the calculation of proportional representation ("plurinominal") deputies elected from the second region.

Suspended in 1943, (Note: The list of members for the 38th Congress (1940–1943) lists a member for the 10th district, but that for the 39th Congress (1943–1946) does not.) Guanajuato's 10th was re-established as part of the 1977 political reforms. The restored district returned its first deputy in the 1979 mid-term election.

The current member for the district, elected in the 2024 general election, is Alejandro Calderón Díaz of the National Regeneration Movement (Morena).

== District territory ==
Under the 2023 districting plan adopted by the National Electoral Institute (INE), which is to be used for the 2024, 2027 and 2030 federal elections, the 10th district is located in the south of Guanajuato and covers 293 electoral precincts (secciones electorales) across seven of the state's 46 municipalities:

- Cortazar, Jaral del Progreso, Moroleón, Salvatierra, Santiago Maravatío, Uriangato and Yuriria.

The head town (cabecera distrital), where results from individual polling stations are gathered together and tallied, is the city of Uriangato. The district reported a population of 415,258 in the 2020 census.

== Previous districting schemes ==
Evolution of electoral district numbers
	1974	1978	1996	2005	2017	2023
Guanajuato	9	13	15	14	15	15
Chamber of Deputies	196	300				

2017–2022

Between 2017 and 2022, the 10th district's head town was at Uriangato and it covered six of the 2023 municipalities: (Note: In 2017–2022, Jaral del Progreso was assigned to the 13th district.)
- Cortazar, Moroleón, Salvatierra, Santiago Maravatío, Uriangato and Yuriria.

2005–2017

Under the 2005 plan, Guanajuato had only 14 districts. This district's head town was at Uriangato and it covered six municipalities in almost the same configuration as in 2017:
- Moroleón, Salvatierra, Santiago Maravatío, Uriangato and Yuriria, but with Tarimoro replacing Cortazar.

1996–2005

In the 1996 scheme, under which Guanajuato was assigned 15 seats, the district comprised four municipalities in the east of the state:
- Apaseo el Alto (head town), Apaseo el Grande, Comonfort and Santa Cruz de Juventino Rosas.

1978–1996

The districting scheme in force from 1978 to 1996 was the result of the 1977 electoral reforms, which increased the number of single-member seats in the Chamber of Deputies from 196 to 300. Under that plan, Guanajuato's seat allocation rose from 9 to 13. The new 10th district covered four municipalities:
- Dolores Hidalgo (head town), Ocampo, San Diego de la Unión and San Felipe.

== Deputies returned to Congress ==
(Mexico) National parties
- Current
- PAN
- PRI
- PT
- PVEM
- MC
- Morena
- PAZ
- Somos
- Defunct or local only
- PLM
- PNR
- PRM
- PNM
- PP
- PPS
- PARM
- PFCRN
- CON
- PANAL
- PSD
- PES
- PES
- PRD

Guanajuato's 10th district
Election	Deputy	Party	Term	Legislature
1916	Enrique Colunga		1916–1917	Constituent Congress of Querétaro
...
The 10th district was suspended between 1943 and 1979
1979	Guillermo González Aguado	Institutional Revolutionary Party	1979–1982	51st Congress
1982	Ausencio Astudillo Bello	Institutional Revolutionary Party	1982–1985	52nd Congress
1985	Felipe Cruz Domínguez Villanueva	Institutional Revolutionary Party	1985–1988	53rd Congress
1988	Everardo Vargas Zavala	Institutional Revolutionary Party	1988–1991	54th Congress
1991	José Azanza Jiménez	Institutional Revolutionary Party	1991–1994	55th Congress
1994	Alejandro Torres Aguilar	Institutional Revolutionary Party	1994–1997	56th Congress
1997	María del Carmen Moreno Contreras	Institutional Revolutionary Party	1997–2000	57th Congress
2000	Juan Mandujano Ramírez	National Action Party (Mexico)	2000–2003	58th Congress
2003	Francisco Isaías Lemus Muñoz Ledo	National Action Party (Mexico)	2003–2006	59th Congress
2006	Artemio Torres Gómez	National Action Party (Mexico)	2006–2009	60th Congress
2009	Norma Leticia Orozco Torres (Note: Originally elected for the PVEM, Orozco Torres switched to PANAL during the congressional session.)	Ecologist Green Party of Mexico New Alliance Party (Mexico)	2009–2012	61st Congress
2012	Raúl Gómez Ramírez (Note: Gómez Ramírez died on 10 December 2014 from injuries sustained in a traffic accident. He was replaced for the remainder of his term by his alternate, Mendoza Jiménez.); Yatziri Mendoza Jiménez	National Action Party (Mexico)	2012–2014; 2014–2015	62nd Congress
2015	David Mercado Ruiz	Institutional Revolutionary Party	2015–2018	63rd Congress
2018	Lilia Villafuerte Zavala (Note: Originally elected for the PRD, Villafuerte Zavala declared herself independent on 5 February 2019. She joined the PVEM group in Congress on 3 September 2019.)	Party of the Democratic Revolution Independent politician Ecologist Green Party of Mexico	2018–2021	64th Congress
2021	Pedro David Ortega Fonseca	National Regeneration Movement	2021–2024	65th Congress
2024	Alejandro Calderón Díaz	National Regeneration Movement	2024–2027	66th Congress

== Presidential elections ==
Guanajuato's 10th district
Election	District won by	Party or coalition	%
2018	Ricardo Anaya Cortés	Por México al Frente	36.5283
2024	Claudia Sheinbaum Pardo	Sigamos Haciendo Historia	57.4221
