= Miguel Ángel Rangel =

Mexican politician (born 1964)

- Born: 15 October 1964 (age 61); Yuriria, Guanajuato, Mexico
- Occupation: Politician
- Political party: PAN

Miguel Ángel Rangel Ávila (born 15 October 1964) is a Mexican politician affiliated with the National Action Party (PAN). In the 2003 mid-terms, he was elected to the Chamber of Deputies to represent Guanajuato's 15th district during the 59th session of Congress.
