= Raúl Gómez Ramírez =

Mexican politician (1964–2014)

- Born: 29 May 1964; Yuriria, Guanajuato, Mexico
- Died: 10 December 2014 (aged 50); Celaya, Guanajuato, Mexico
- Occupation: Politician
- Political party: PAN

Raúl Gómez Ramírez (29 May 1964 – 10 December 2014) was a Mexican politician affiliated with the National Action Party (PAN). In the 2012 general election, he was elected to the Chamber of Deputies to represent Guanajuato's 10th district during the 62nd session of Congress.

On 16 November 2014 Gómez was involved in a traffic accident near Celaya, Guanajuato. He died from injuries related to the accident on 10 December. The remainder of his congressional term was served out by his alternate, Yatziri Mendoza Jiménez.
