= Gerardo Sánchez García =

Mexican politician (born 1960)

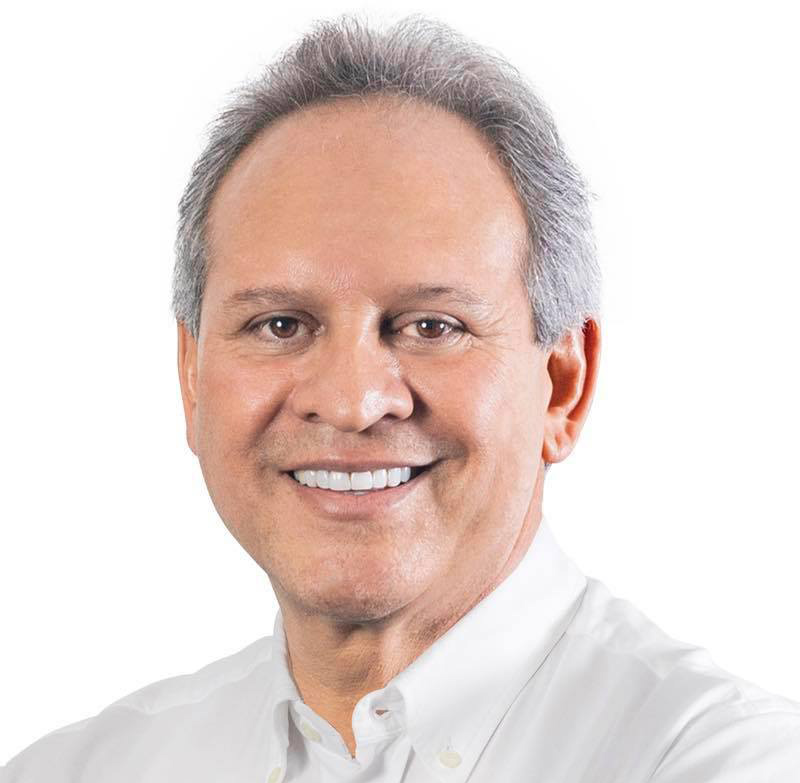
- Born: 1 October 1960 (age 65); Salvatierra, Guanajuato, Mexico
- Education: UMSNH; UNAM
- Occupation: Politician
- Political party: PRI

Gerardo Sánchez García (born 1 October 1960) is a Mexican politician affiliated with the Institutional Revolutionary Party (PRI).

Between 1995 and 1997 he served as the municipal president of his home town, Salvatierra, Guanajuato. He has been elected to the Chamber of Deputies on two occasions: in the 1997 mid-terms (57th Congress), for Guanajuato's 15th district; and in the 2009 mid-terms (61st Congress), as a plurinominal deputy for the 2nd region.

In the 2012 general election, he was elected to the Senate from the PRI's national list. He served from 2012 to 2018, during the 62nd and 63rd congressional sessions.
