= Porullo =

Coordinates: 20°10′N 101°06′W

Porullo is a village located in Yuriria, Guanajuato, Mexico. It was founded by Basque settlers. The land area of Porullo is about 10 square miles (26 km^{2}), with 715 inhabitants.

== Population ==
Those born in Porullo tend to emigrate as young adults and live elsewhere (primarily Illinois, California, Florida, and Texas), but often they return, in December, due to Christmas festivities, weddings and Quinceañera parties planned around this time of the year.
