= Artemio Torres Gómez =

Mexican politician (born 1967)

- Born: 19 July 1967 (age 58); Guanajuato, Mexico
- Occupation: Politician
- Political party: PAN

Artemio Torres Gómez (born 19 July 1967) is a Mexican politician affiliated with the National Action Party (PAN). In the 2006 general election, he was elected to the Chamber of Deputies to represent Guanajuato's 10th district during the 60th session of Congress.
