= Rubí Laura López Silva =

Mexican politician (born 1970)

- Born: 16 January 1970 (age 56); Celaya, Guanajuato, Mexico
- Occupation: Politician
- Political party: PAN

Rubí Laura López Silva (born 16 January 1970) is a Mexican politician affiliated with the National Action Party (PAN). In the 2006 general election, she was elected to the Chamber of Deputies to represent Guanajuato's 12th district during the 60th session of Congress.
