= Elizabeth Yáñez Robles =

Mexican politician

- Born: 29 September 1945 (age 80); Torreón, Coahuila, Mexico
- Education: Celaya Institute of Technology; Charles III University of Madrid
- Occupation: Politician
- Political party: PAN

Elizabeth Oswelia Yáñez Robles (born 29 September 1945) is a Mexican politician affiliated with the National Action Party (PAN).

In the 2003 mid-terms, she was elected to the Chamber of Deputies to represent Guanajuato's 12th district during the 59th session of Congress. She returned to Congress in the 2012 general election as a plurinominal deputy for the 2nd region.
