= Martín Rico Jiménez =

Mexican politician (born 1959)

- Born: 1 July 1959 (age 66); Celaya, Guanajuato, Mexico
- Education: Universidad de Guanajuato
- Occupation: Politician
- Political party: PAN

Martín Rico Jiménez (born 1 July 1959) is a Mexican politician from the National Action Party (PAN). In the 2009 mid-terms, he was elected to the Chamber of Deputies to represent Guanajuato's 12th district during the 61st session of Congress.
