= Felipe Arturo Camarena =

Mexican politician (born 1956)

- Born: 5 February 1956 (age 70); Guanajuato, Mexico
- Occupation: Politician
- Political party: PVEM

Felipe Arturo Camarena García (born 5 February 1956) is a Mexican politician affiliated with the Ecologist Green Party of Mexico (PVEM). In the 2012 general election, he was elected to the Chamber of Deputies to represent Guanajuato's 12th district during the 62nd session of Congress.
