= Leticia Orozco Torres =

Mexican politician (born 1953)

- Born: 5 January 1953 (age 73); Guanajuato, Mexico
- Occupation: Politician
- Political party: PVEM (2006–2012); PANAL (2012–present)

Norma Leticia Orozco Torres (born 5 January 1953) is a Mexican politician from the New Alliance Party (formerly from the Ecologist Green Party of Mexico). In the 2009 mid-terms, she was elected to the Chamber of Deputies to represent Guanajuato's 10th district during the 61st session of Congress.
