= Casacuarán =

Town in Guanajuato, Mexico

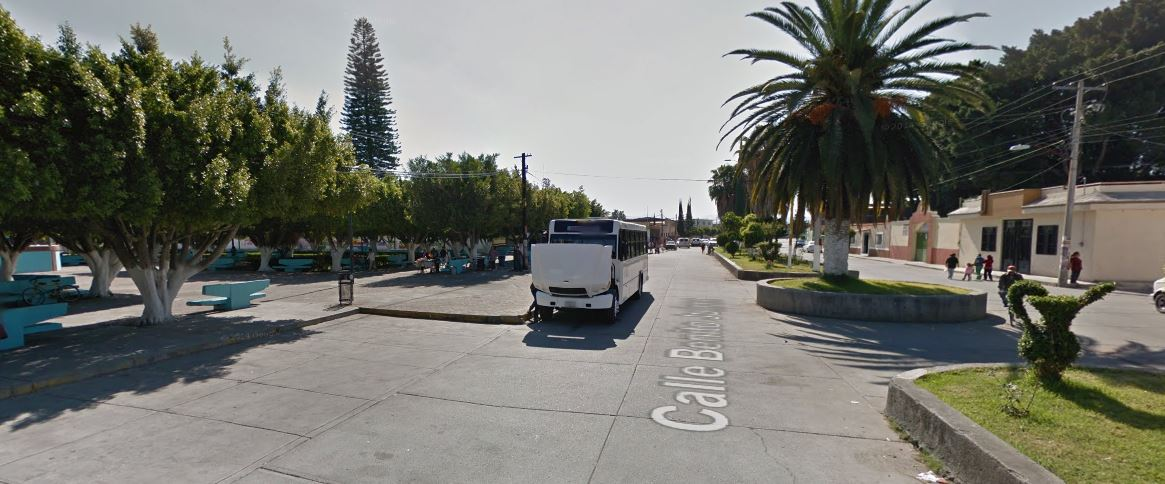
BENITO JUAREZ CASACUARAN

San Pablo Casacuarán is a small town located in the southern region of the state of Guanajuato, Mexico. Commonly known just as Casacuarán, it stands on the road connecting the cities of Yuriria, Santiago Maravatio and Salvatierra. Every January the town has a celebration of San Pablo on January 25. The celebration goes from January 18–25 with a huge procession down main street from the top to the bottom of the town on its last day. The celebration consists of folkloric dance presentations and many shows and award ceremonies. There is also a huge carnival that goes on for the days of the fiesta; on the last two days of the celebration there are jaripeos (rodeos).

== Demographics ==
A census conducted in the year 2000 shows there is a population of 3,398.

== Geography ==
- Location: 20°11′57″N 101°2′28″W
- Altitude: 1,787 meters (5,866 feet)
