= Francisco Lemus Muñoz Ledo =

Mexican politician (born 1961)

Francisco Lemus Muñoz
- Born: 23 February 1961 (age 65); Apaseo el Grande, Guanajuato, Mexico
- Education: Arquitecto por la Universidad Nacional Autónoma de México Maestro en Restauración de Sitios y Monumentos por la Universidad de Guanajuato Actualmente cursa los estudios de la Maestría en Planeamiento Urbano y Regional por la Universidad de Guanajuato
- Occupations: Arquitecto, Político y Empresario
- Political party: Partido Acción Nacional

Francisco Isaías Lemus Muñoz Ledo (born 23 February 1961) is a Mexican politician affiliated with the National Action Party (PAN).In 2003 he was Deputy plurinominal Local PAN in Guanajuato LVIII Legislature . President of the Commission of Public Works and Urban Development ; Member of the Commission of Education, Culture and Publishing Affairs ; Member of the Committee on Environment and Ecology. In the 2003 mid-terms, he was elected to the Chamber of Deputies to represent Guanajuato's 10th district during the 59th session of Congress. 1991 candidate for alderman of the municipality of Apaseo El Grande, Guanajuato 1994 candidate for mayor of Apaseo El Grande, Guanajuato, PAN 1996 active members, 1997 PAN candidate of a local deputy Guanajuato, from 1997 to 2000 Secretary of organization of CDM PAN Apaseo el Grande, Guanajuato, from 1997 to 2002 Political Advisor in the CDM PAN Apaseo el Grande, Guanajuato, from 2001 to 2003 State Counsel in the CDE PAN in Leon, Guanajuato.
