= Lake Yuriria =

- Laguna de Yuriria (Spanish)
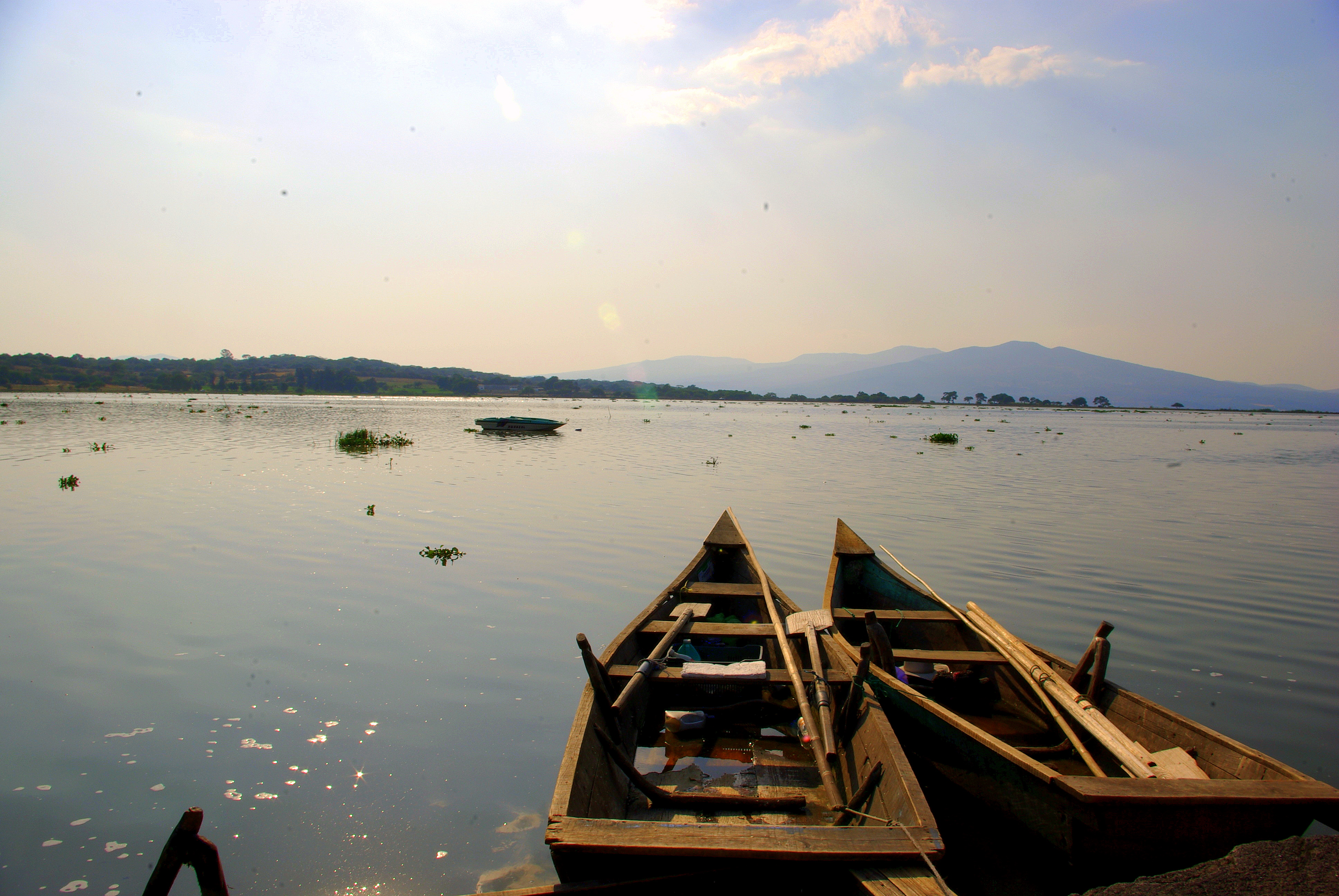

- Location of Lake Yuriria in Guanajuato Location of Lake Yuriria in Mexico
- Location: Guanajuato, Mexico
- Coordinates: 20°14′51″N 101°8′58″W
- Type: Reservoir
- Primary inflows: canal to the Lerma River
- Primary outflows: canal to the Lerma River
- Catchment area: Lerma River
- Basin countries: Mexico
- Surface area: 7,200 ha (18,000 acres)
- Max. depth: 2.6 m (8 ft 6 in)
- Surface elevation: 1,730 m (5,680 ft)
- Settlements: Yuriria

Ramsar Wetland
- Official name: Laguna de Yuriria
- Designated: 2 February 2004
- Reference no.: 1934

Lake Yuriria (Spanish Laguna de Yuriria) is a reservoir in Guanajuato state of central Mexico. The reservoir has existed since the 16th century, and is used for irrigation of the surrounding farms. The lake is an important habitat for waterbirds, and was declared a wetland of international importance.

== Geography ==
Lake Yuriria is located in the basin of the Lerma River, in the southern portion of Guanajuato state. It lies west of the Lerma River, to which it is connected by a canal. The town of Yuriria is on the south shore of the lake, and the lake is within Yuriria Municipality.

The lake covers an area of 7200 ha, and is generally shallow, with a maximum depth of 2.6 m.

The lake is linked by a canal to the Lerma River, which refills the lake during wet periods. Lake water is distributed to adjacent farms by irrigation channels during dry months. Flow to and from the Lerma is regulated by gates.

Lake Cuitzeo lies to the north. Lake Cuitzeo is mostly a closed, or endorheic basin, but historically it overflowed into Lake Yuriria via an old channel. Lake Cuitzeo's water is brackish and unfit for irrigation, and by the 19th century a levee was built south of Lake Cuitzeo to prevent overflows into Lake Yuriria.

== History ==
The name is a shortened version Yuririapundaro, which means "lake of blood" in the Purépecha language. Prior to the Spanish conquest, the lake was part of the Purépecha Empire.

The canal was constructed in 1548 at the direction of Friar Diego de Chávez, an Augustinian friar, and is among the first hydraulic engineering works in colonial America. Friar Diego de Chávez also commenced construction of the Augustinan monastery in the town of Yuriria, on the southern shore of the lake.

== Flora and fauna ==
The lake is eutrophic, with low visibility (.2 meters), and abundant aquatic vegetation.

The lake is an important habitat for migratory birds. 142 bird species were recorded between 1981 and 1997, of which 44 are aquatic. Species include the red-tailed hawk (Buteo jamaicensis), peregrine falcon (Falco peregrinus), blue-winged teal (Spatula discors), American wigeon (Mareca americana), Mexican duck (Anas diazi), American white pelican (Pelecanus erythrorhynchos), Townsend's solitaire (Myadestes townsendi), black-vented oriole (Icterus wagleri), hooded oriole (Icterus cucullatus), and black-polled yellowthroat (Geothlypis speciosa). It is designated an Important Bird Area.

The land surrounding the lake is in the Bajío dry forests ecoregion.

== Conservation ==
In 2004 it was designated a wetland of international importance under the Ramsar convention. The Ramsar site covers 15,020 ha, and includes the entire lake and the lands around the shore.
