= Moroleón =

City in the Mexican state of Guanajuato

Coordinates: 20°08′N 101°12′W

- City
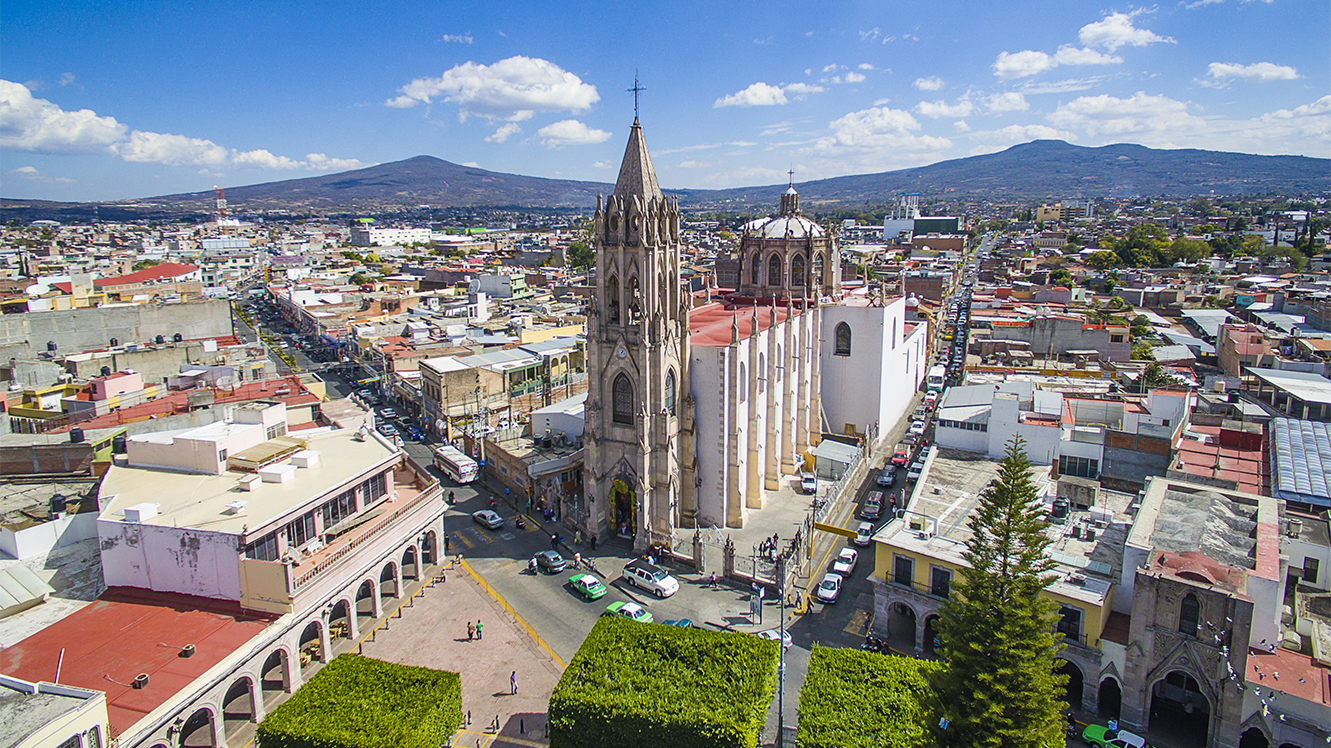
- St. John the Baptist Church on the main square of Moroléon

- Coat of arms
- Interactive map of Moroleón
- Country: Mexico
- State: Guanajuato
- Municipality: Moroleón
- Established: 1929

Population (2005)
  - Total: 41,909
- Time zone: UTC−6 (CST)
- Website: http://moroleon.guanajuato.gob.mx

Moroleón is a city and municipal seat of the municipality of Moroleón in the Mexican state of Guanajuato. It is near the cities of Yuriria, Morelia, and Uriangato, forming the metropolitan area of Uriangato-Moroleón with Uriangato. The municipality has an area of 164.97 km^{2} (60.606 sq mi), with an urban population of 41,909 and municipal population of 46,751 as of 2005.

Moroleón is considered an important clothes shopping destination in Guanajuato, with clothing stores that line the streets for miles as it is one of the leading cities of the textile industry in all of Mexico. The city holds annual festivals on 16 January and 16 September to celebrate the history of the Catholic Church in Mexico and the independence of Mexico, respectively.

== History ==
In 1604, Dona Juana María de Medina y Calderón was granted land in the jurisdiction of Yuririapúndaro in southern Guanajuato by 9th Viceroy of New Spain Don Gaspar de Zúñiga y Acevedo (1560-1606). Eventually, the heir to jurisdiction of Yuririapúndaro Don Jose Guzman Lopez begin settling the lands in 1775 along with several other prominent families of the area. The jurisdiction of Yuririapúndaro would be the land where Moroleón would be officially recognized by the state of Guanajuato as a municipality in 1845. The municipality of Moroleón was 1 of 46 municipalities across the state of Guanajuato that were created by a governor's Decree of Creation on November 19, 1845. In 1929, Moroleón was officially recognized as a city by decree of the state of Guanajuato Governor Agustín Arroyo Ch.

== Notable people ==
- Salud Carbajal (born 1964), U.S. representative from California
