= Uriangato =

- City
- Uriangato City
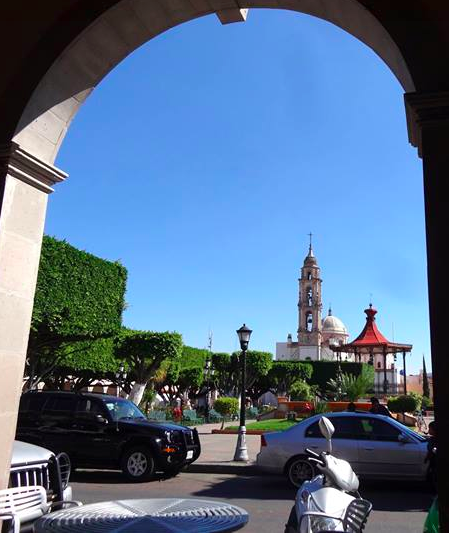
- Uriangato Historic Downtown

- Coat of arms
- Nickname: Spanish: Lugar donde el sol se pone levantado (English: Place where sunset occurs on top)
- Location within Guanajuato Location within Mexico
- Coordinates: 20°08′N 101°10′W
- Country: Mexico
- State: Guanajuato
- Region: Centro
- Municipality: Uriangato
- Foundation: February 20, 1604
- Founder: Fray Diego de Chavez

Government
  - Municipal President: Carlos "Tanao" Guzman Camarena (PVEM)

Area
  - City: 14.91 km^{2} (5.76 sq mi)
  - Metro: 276.1 km^{2} (106.6 sq mi)
  - Municipality: 116.3 km^{2} (44.9 sq mi)
- Elevation: 1,810 m (5,940 ft)

Population (2020 census)
  - City: 52,156
  - Density: 3,498/km^{2} (9,060/sq mi)
  - Metro: 108,755
  - Metro density: 393.9/km^{2} (1,020/sq mi)
  - Municipality: 61,494
  - Municipality density: 528.8/km^{2} (1,369/sq mi)
- Demonym: Uriangatense
- Time zone: UTC−6 (CST)
- Website: www.uriangato.gob.mx

Uriangato is a city and one of 46 municipalities of Guanajuato, located just north of the border between the states of Guanajuato and Michoacán in west central Mexico. Uriangato city is geographically united with Moroleon city and Yuriria city, these three cities form a metropolitan area. Since October 2010, this metropolitan area is the 75th biggest city of Mexico and the 5th biggest in Guanajuato. It is smallest of the 56 metropolitan areas in Mexico.

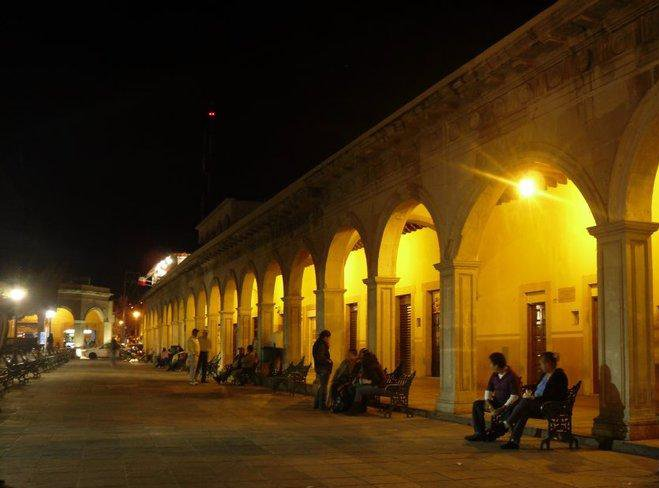
Uriangato downtown.

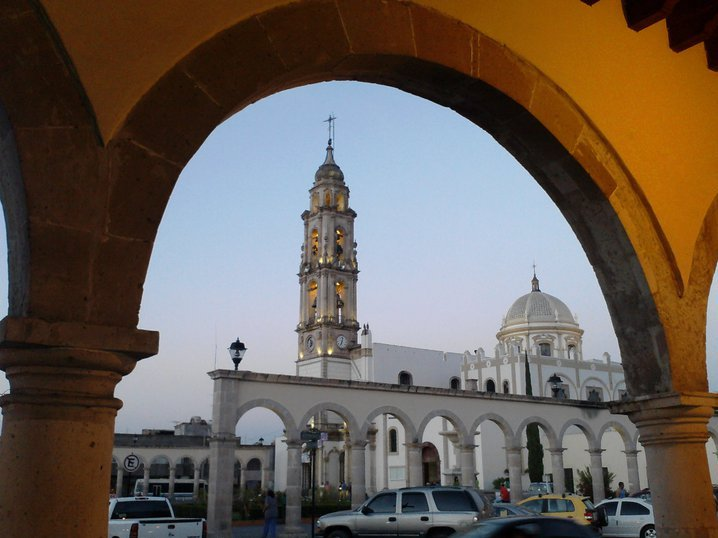
Uriangato's principal church.

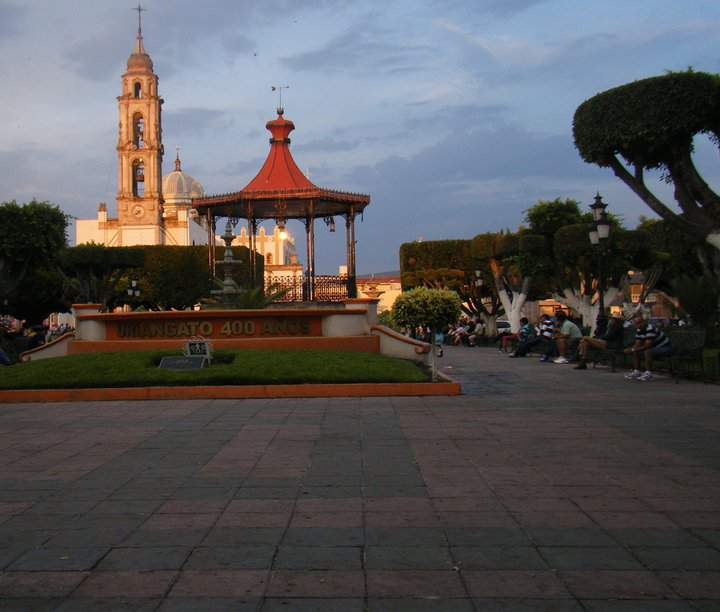
Uriangato downtown's principal garden.

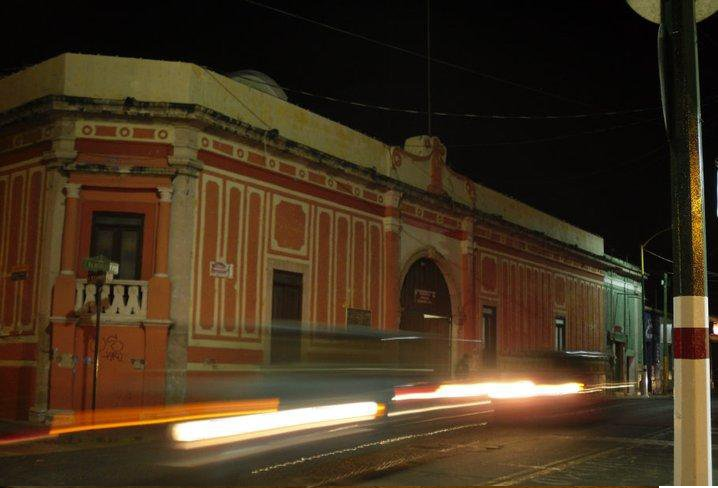
Traditional building in Uriangato.

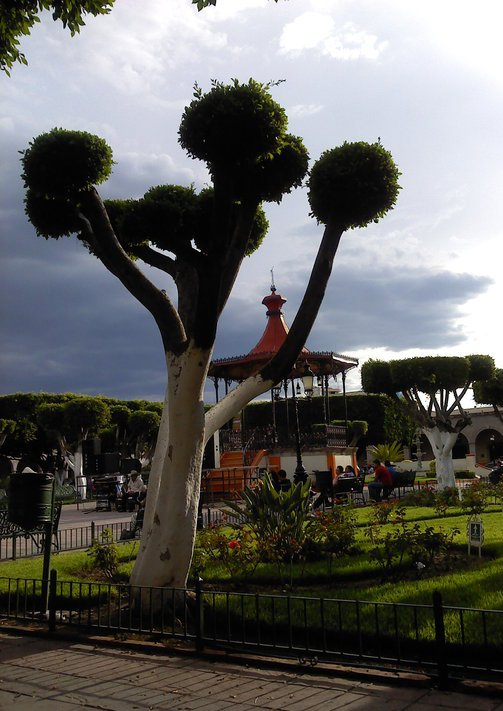
Principal Garden in Uriangato.

According to the United Nations/PNUD, in 2005 Uriangato was a municipality of High Human Development, with an index of 0.8147 (scale 0 to 1). This puts Uriangato at 432nd place in the country (2,454 municipalities of México) and 8th in all Guanajuato state (46 municipalities of Guanajuato), in terms of quality of life.

An average person in Uriangato earned $8,607 US dollars ($110,200 pesos) during one year (2005), which puts Uriangato in 365th place in the country and 12th place in Guanajuato state.

Uriangato, like all of Guanajuato state, is considered by CONAPO to be a High Migration Municipality, because more than 10% of its families receive money from their relatives in the United States. This situation has improved the quality of life in Uriangato, most of whose emigrants live in California, Texas, Illinois, Indiana, Missouri, Pennsylvania and New York.

== Toponymy ==
Uriangato is the Spanish version of a Purepecha word that means "the place where the sunset occurs on top" or anapu-nani-hima-huriata-hari-jatzhicuni-anandini in Purepecha.

== History ==
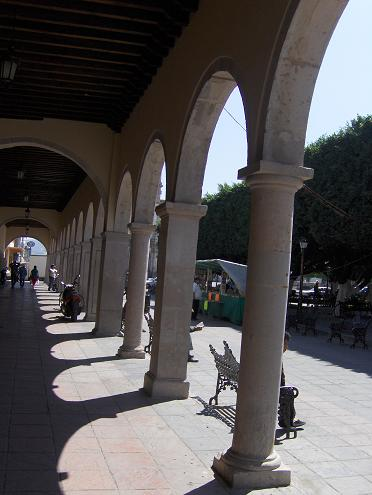
Neoclasic architecture at Uriangato's downtown

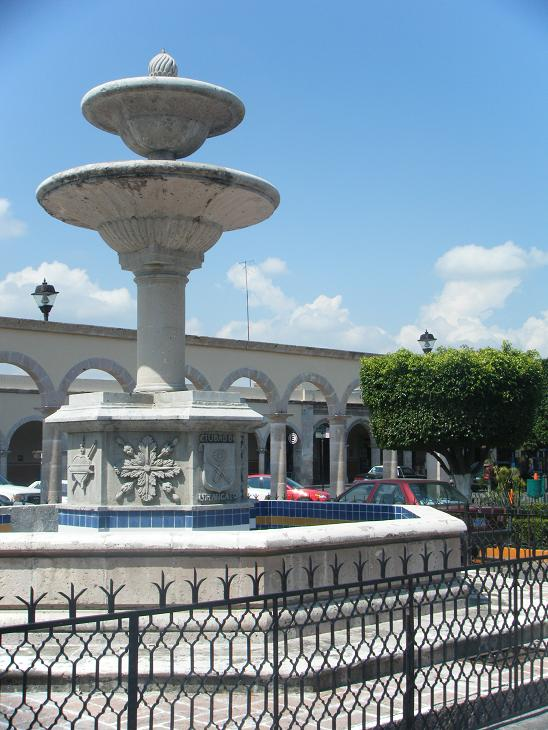
Public fountain in San Miguel Arcangel's church

Uriangato's land belonged to several native groups of Tarascos since the end of the 14th century. In 1597 Juan Ignacio Córcoles began to administer the Royal Certificate. Uriangato became part of Spain on February 20, 1604, by mandate of King Felipe III, who bestowed on it the official name of San Miguel de Uriangato. On November 19, 1845, the state congress of Guanajuato designated it as a Town, and in 1951 the local Congress granted it the title City of Uriangato.

=== Pre-Hispanic age ===
In pre-Hispanic times Uriangato was inhabited by native Purhépechas (Tarascos). At the beginning of the 15th century Uriangato and its environs were a territory between the Chichimecas and Purépechas whose opposing three kingdoms (señoríos) were located in what is today the State of Michoacán. The territory of Uriangato comprised the North border of the three Señoríos Tarascos; the "Great Chichimeca," named by the Spanish conquerors, began to the north of the Lerma River. The Spanish conquest of the New World left an indelible mark with the establishment of an indigenous population in the region.

=== Settlement ===
San Miguel Uriangato was founded in 1549 with the aim of improving natives' quality of life under the guidance of Fray Diego de Chávez.

On June 3, 1701 the Spanish Virrey (Viceroy) granted protection to the Mayor and the settlers of San Miguel Uriangato. In 1790 construction began on the Church's “two Towers,” where the Sanctuary of Lady of Guadalupe is located today. In 1804 Mayor Jose Dionisio Vallejo, as well as Juan Vallejo Bautista, asked the government for 600 varas (503 meters; at the virreinal time a vara was equivalent to 33 inches) for each cardinal point, the equivalent of the municipality of Yuriria today. Subsequently, new lands were annexed when the citizens of Yuriria observed the advantages of belonging to nearby San Miguel Uriangato. Land was similarly annexed by Moroleón's first inhabitants from Uriangato to form Moroleón's new municipality.

=== From Independence to Mexican Revolution (1810-1910) ===
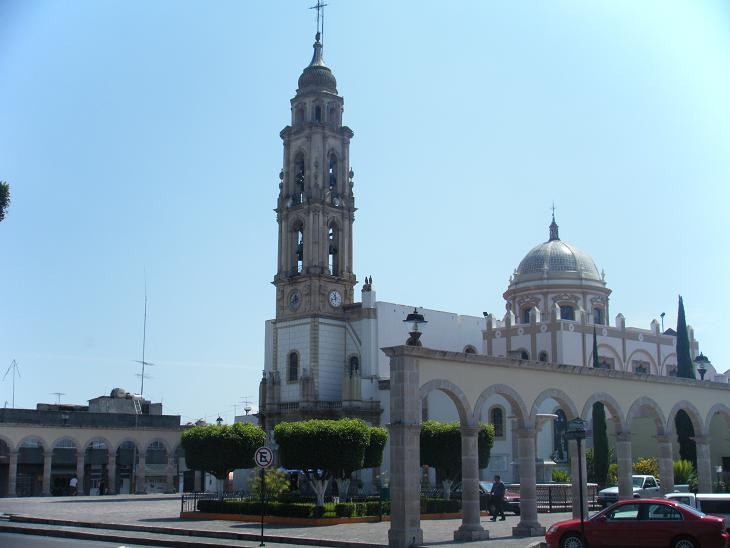
San Miguel Arcángel's church

In 1810 an insurgent army commanded by the priest Don Miguel Hidalgo y Costilla arrived at Uriangato, on the road to Valladolid—now known as Morelia—comprising the so-called Route of Independence—today route 2010.

=== Early 20th century ===
On December 10, 1908, the town of Uriangato officially became a Villa, by Decree Number 6 of XXIII, the Congress of the State. On November 9, 1951, the XLI Legislature of Guanajuato state's Congress declared Uriangato a City. By the end of 1908 the Kiosco of the Main Garden was constructed, and a year later street cars linked the Towns of Uriangato and Moroleón. Up until that time Uriangato's perimeter consisted of the following streets: 16 of September, Insurgente Olivares, Salvador Urrutia and Lerdo.

On June 24, 1918, the Heroic Defense of Uriangato was carried out against the notorious local bandit Inés Chávez García. Chávez García was typical of many Post-Revolutionary bandits who assaulted Mexican towns at that time. In 1919 a clock was added to the tower of San Miguel Arcángel church, whose construction was completed on November 10, 1923.

=== Textile industry beginnings ===
The production of rebozos (shawls) energized the textile industry by the middle of the 20th century in Uriangato and Moroleón. Little by little people took to producing handmade artesanal sweaters, blouses and shirts woven with a hook needle. The 1960s saw Uriangato's first clothing factories. Many textiles produced in Uriangato were sold in other Mexican cities. Nevertheless, due to the great demand for Uriangato-made clothing, the first street market (tianguis) was installed by the 1980s. The tianguis characterizes Uriangato all over México and elsewhere. It has contributed greatly to the progress and improvement of Uriangatenses' quality of life. Nearly sixty-percent of Uriangatenses work in the clothing business.

=== 21st century ===
In 2003 the Congress of the State issued Decree 204, which ordered that Moroleón return to Uriangato 160 hectares (400 acres) of land located from the present borderline to the community of "El Salto." This decree was vetoed on August 7, 2003 by the Governor of Guanajuato Juan Carlos Romero Hicks with the aim of avoiding social unrest.

In 2004 the construction of the Aldama vestibule and the remodeling of Uriangato's historical downtown were completed, to commemorate the 400th anniversary of Uriangato's legal foundation. The festivities were accompanied by a light and sound show, as well as a folkloric ballet presentation directed by Amalia Hernandez.

On July 17, 2008 the first mall in the region opened: Metropolitan Galleries, including a supermarket (Soriana), a 7-part movie theater (Cinepolis), a fast-food court, bank, and several stores providing a variety of services and merchandise—as well as a large parking lot.

=== Geography ===
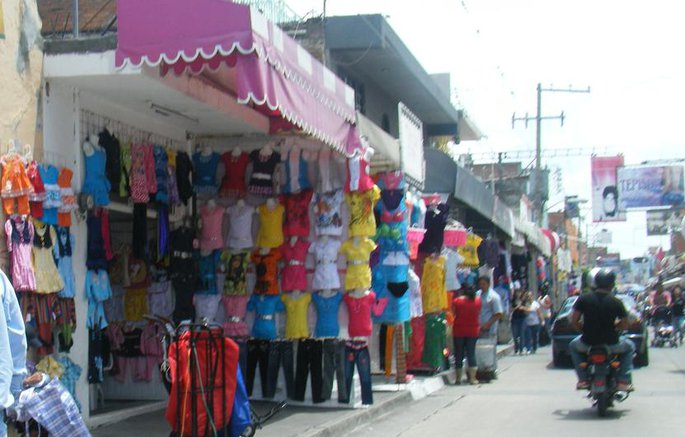
Tianguis textil in Uriangato.

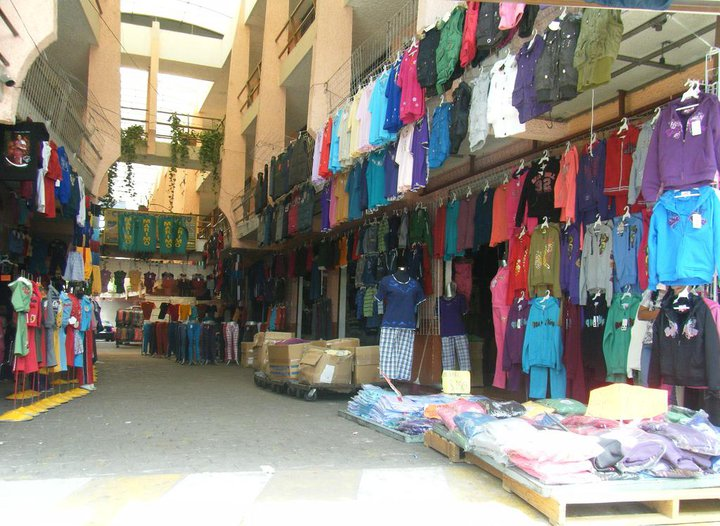
Comercio textil in Uriangato.

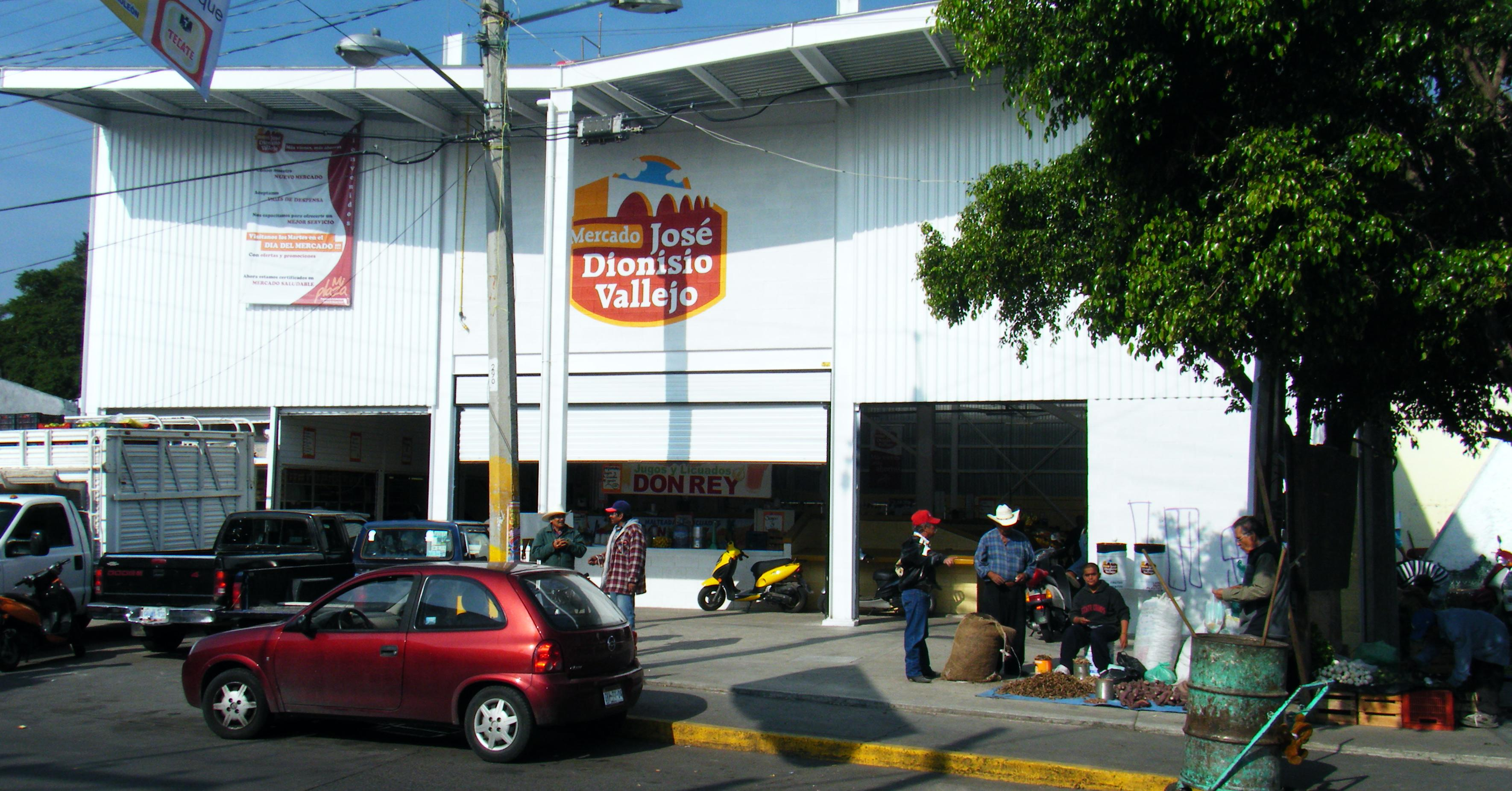
County market in Uriangato.

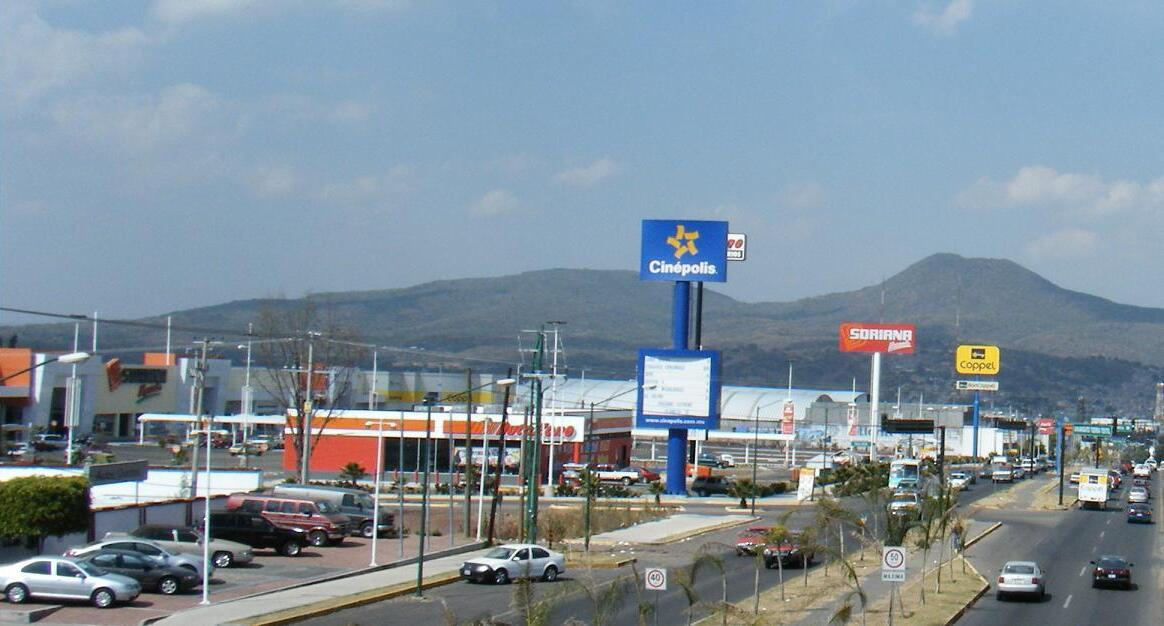
Mall in Uriangato.

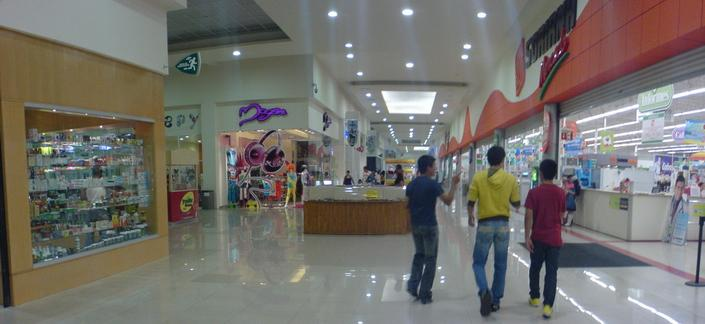
Inside the mall in Uriangato.

Uriangato is located in the southern area of Guanajuato state. It has an elevation of 1,800 meters (5,900 ft) above sea level, its coordinates are: north 20°12' N, south 20°02' N, East 101°05' W, west 101°13' W. Its area is 115.8 km^{2} (44.7 sq mi) which represents 0.41% of the area of Guanajuato state.

=== Municipal subdivisions by locality ===
Uriangato has 19 localities; these are classified as 1 city, Uriangato, and 18 towns: The Derramadero, The Aguacate, the Rodriguez, the Zavala, the Lagunilla del rico, the Peonía, the Cinta, Portalitos, Buenavista, San Jóse Cuaracurío, Lagunilla del Encinal, the Comal, the Charco, Rancho del Cerro, Charándaro, the Presa, Cupuato and Huahuemba.

=== Neighborhoods in Uriangato city ===
Uriangato city has several neighborhoods, the most important are: Downtown, Plan de Ayala, Lázaro Cárdenas, Las Aguilillas, La Joyita, Cuitzillo, Juárez, La deseada de Arriba, La deseada de abajo, the Missions, Emiliano Zapata, Deportiva, Lindavista, 24 de Junio, Loma Bonita, San Miguel, Loma Linda, Las Peñitas, Agrícola, Magisterial, Revolution, Loma Linda, Independencia, Francisco Villa, Rome, La Yacata, La Mesa, Los Laurels, Pedregal, La Manga del Pirul, La Venadita, La Mora, Los Pinos, Textil Bedolla, among others currently becoming urbanized.

=== Limits ===
On the east and the north Uriangato shares borders with Yuriria, on the west with Moroleón, and on the south with the municipalities of Cuitzeo and Santa Ana Maya in Michoacán state. Uriangato is located midway between Cuitzeo's lake (located 12 km to the south) and Yuriria's lake (located 10 km to the north).

=== Metropolitan area Uriangato-Moroleón ===
The border between Uriangato and Moroleón begins at 24 de Junio and Lindavista (Uriangato) behind the Sanctuary of Guadalupe (Moroleón). From there the border descends by Aquiles Serdán St. (Uriangato) from the Sanctuary of Guadalupe (Moroleón) to Jaime Nunó St. (Moroleón) or Miguel Martinez St. (Uriangato); both municipalities are separated by a single street with different names: Pípila (Uriangato) or Alvaro Obregón (Moroleón) in the central area that street are named 5 de Febrero (Uriangato) or Nezahualcóyotl (Moroleón). The locally famous borderline between 16 de Septiembre St. (Uriangato) or Colón St. (Moroleón) continues with 16 de Septiembre St. (Uriangato) or 12 de Octubre St (Moroleón). Further south Prolongación Madero St. (Uriangato) becomes Dr. García de Alba St. (Moroleón). Elsewhere, borderlines are in dispute, mainly in the friendship zone turnaround, where Blvd. Morelos (Uriangato) is also known as Blvd. Agustín Leon (Moroleón).

=== Hydrography ===
Uriangato is within the Hydrologic region Lerma-Chapala-Santiago that includes eastern portions of Mexico state, northern areas of Michoacán, southern parts of Guanajuato and Nayarit as well as northern and eastern sections of Jalisco. The hydrologic river basin which Uriangato belongs to is Cuenca Lagos de Pátzcuaro-Cuitzeo-Yuriria. The main current is Huahuemba's river (it begins at Boulevard Juarez and flows on to the Presa de Huahuemba). The river issues forth from the confluence of two streams: Uriangato river which comes from Cuitzeo's lake and Moroleón river which comes from downtown Moroleón and crosses the Aurrerá's mall on 12 de Octubre St. Both rivers are united north of the Municipal Auditorium near Blvd. Juárez.

Uriangato's underground water-bearing mantles are one of the biggest in Guanajuato state. The underground hydraulic resources belong to Sub-region Middle Lerma, which includes more of 80% of the municipality surface in Uriangato. (Source: National Water Commission of Guanajuato state).

=== Orography ===
Uriangato is located in the southern region of the Bajío, a level area dotted with hills. The main hills are the "Cerro del Comal" (2,240 m or 7,349 ft), the "Cerro del Capulín" (2,140 m or 7,021 ft) and the "Cerro Prieto" (2,085 m or 6,841 ft). The soil is mainly black chernozem with some chesnut-colored soil accompanying it. The soil is considered one of the richest for agriculture in all Mexico

The annual precipitation average is 800 mm (31.5 in).

=== Climate ===
The weather is temperate (semiwarm and subhumid) pretty much all year, with moderate rains in summer and winter. Temperatures vary between 10 and 15 °C (50 and 59 °F). In 2008 a minimum temperature of 33 °F (1 °C) was registered on January 4 and a maximum temperature of 96.8 °F (36.0 °C) on May 4.

Winds are light, fluctuating between 0 and 5 km/h (3 mph). The maximum sustained winds registered in 2008 was 14.5 km/h (9 mph) on February 5, and maximum gusts were 14.4 km/h (9 mph) on February 4–6. Uriangato isn't affected by extreme meteorological phenomena (snow, hurricanes) because it is located between two mountain ranges. Source: Meteorological service Nacional/CNA.

=== Vegetation ===
Vegetation in Uriangato includes mezquite, along with other species like encino, cazahuate, huizache, nopal, palobebo, palodulce, guamuchil, apulinillo, papelillo, penknife, zacatón, tresbarbas, flechilla of amor, buffalo, diente de león. Nowadays some species introduced from other regions grow in the urban zone; most abundant is the laurel de la India, followed by eucalyptus, laurel, ash, willow, camelina, hueledenoche, rubber tree, jacaranda, pine, palm, date palm, organ and such fruit trees as lemon, naranjo, avocado, handle, guayabo and the grenade. The main agricultural crops are corn, plus chick-peas, alfalfa, wheat and beans.

=== Fauna ===
Wild animals still live in and around Uriangato. Although some species have fled from urban growth, the following birds can still be found: the sparrow, the dove huilota, the cardinal, the calandria, petirrojo, the quail, zenzontle, the crow, the correcaminos and aguililla—not to mention mammals like the rabbit, the squirrel, tejón, opossum, coyote, zorrillo and tuza. There are also reptiles like the coralillo, the chameleon, the small lizard, the snout of pig and the salamander. Within the corral are mammals such as the hen, guajolote, the ostrich, torcaza, the rooster, the pig, the horse, the burro, goats and lambs.

== Demographics ==
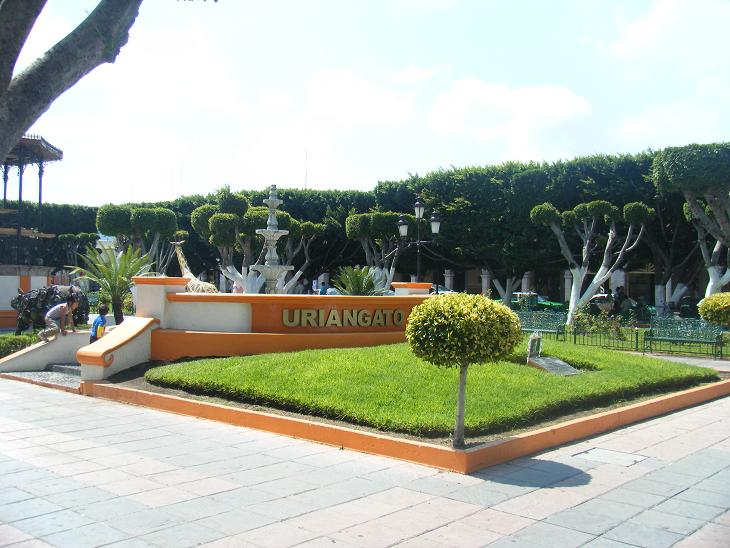
Principal Garden in Uriangato.

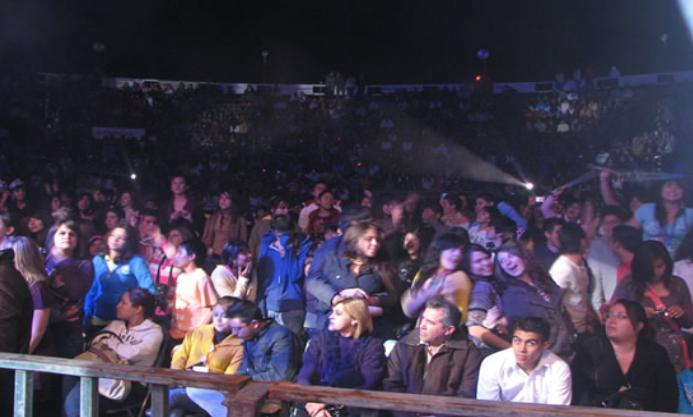
People in Uriangato.

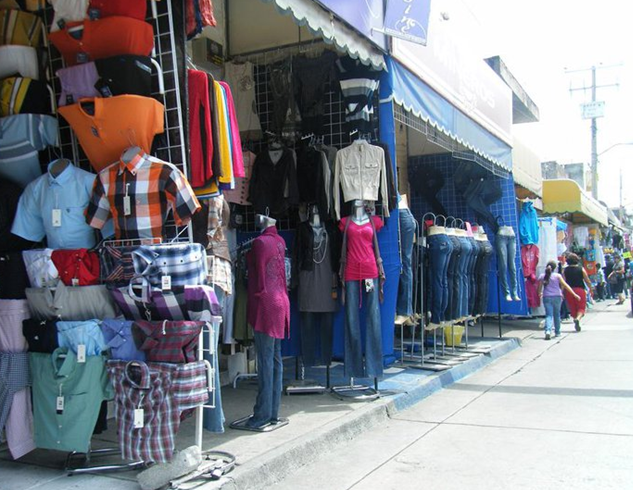
Tianguis in Uriangato.

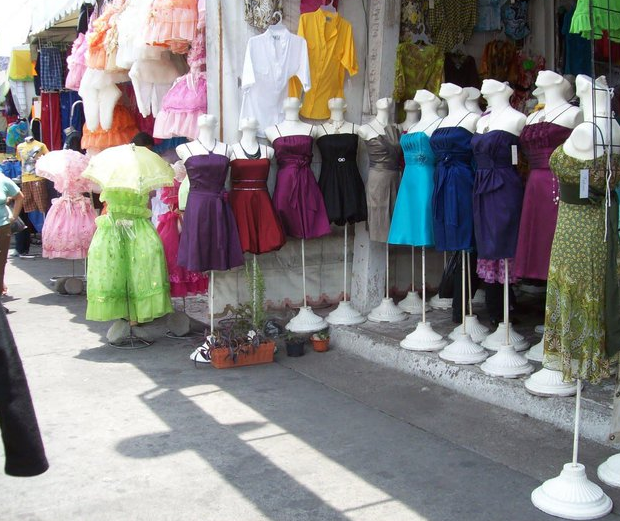
Economic activities in Uriangato.

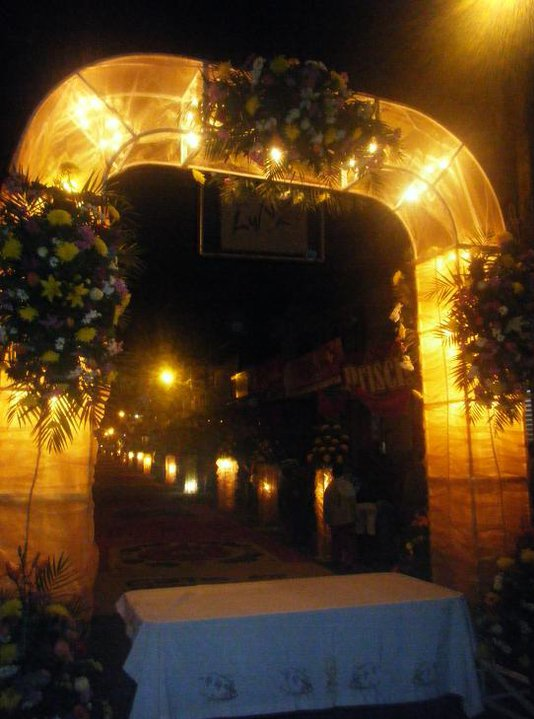
Traditional folklore in Uriangato.

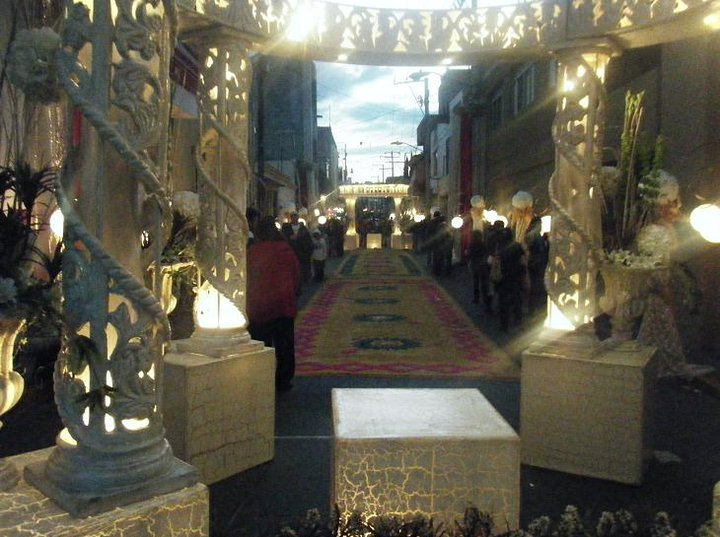
"La octava noche" in Uriangato.

During the 20th century, Uriangato grew at a similar rate with the rest of Mexico. The city's population grew from slightly under 3,000 to over 50,000 by 2000.

According to INEGI's 2010 census, there were 59,305 people, 13,096 households, nearly 15,000 families who live in Uriangato. Ninety percent of Uriangatenses live in the city. The urban population density was 457.3 people per square km, making it one of the state's most densely populated cities.

The following list shows the distribution of Uriangato's municipal population, according to Mexico's 2005 census:

URIANGATO COUNTY: 59,305 people.

Uriangato city 51,382 people.

El Derramadero: 919 people.

San José Cuaracurío: 862 people.

Fracc. Las Misiones: 782 people.

Colonia Juárez: 690 people.

El Charco: 611 people.

La Presa: 482 people.

Rancho El Cerro: 460 people.

Los Portalitos: 414 people.

El Aguacate: 351 people.

Rancho Nuevo Cupuato : 338 people.

Lagunilla del rico: 321 people.

Huahuemba: 251 people.

Lagunilla del Encinal: 186 people.

Los Rodriguez: 165 people.

Buenavista: 164 people.

La Cinta: 97 people.

Fracc. La Mesa 92 people.

El Comal: 90 people.

Los Zavala: 39 people.

La Peonía Residencial 34 people.

Fracc. Campestre 30 people.

La Peonía: 17 people.

El Mirador 12 people.

Parque 9 people.

Predio La Lomita 8 people.

Rancho Alegre 7 people.

Casa Hipona 6 people.

Villa Paraíso del Sur 6 people.

Potrero de Los Andrade 4 people.

Charándaro: 3 people.

== Dwellings ==
In 2005 Uriangatenses lived in 13,096 houses, 10,162 (78%) of which were headed by a man, and 2,934 (22%) of which were headed by a woman.

Uriangato's housing situation favorably contrasts with that of Guanajuato state: in Uriangato during 2005 9,643 houses had 4 rooms and 3,453 had 5 or more rooms. Fewer than 5 people lived in 4,826 houses (36.8%); the remaining houses (63.2%) had 5 or more occupants. However, houses in Uriangato are bigger than Guanajuato's. Ninety-six percent of Uriangatenses' houses have firm floors, while only 4% have earth floors; 97.5% of their houses have drainage, 99.6% have electricity and 98.9% have running water. (Source: Demographic basic indicators CONAPO 2005)

== Tourism and culture ==
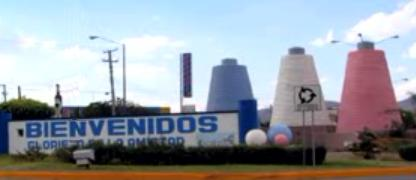
"Glorieta Moroleón" on the land conflict area with Moroleon.

=== Tourism ===
Tourism in Uriangato has a mainly commercial character; the city isn't visited because of its monuments or their colonial beauty. On the contrary, people from all over Mexico visit Uriangato to buy clothes, as well as traditional ocote pine–burning lamps.

Moreover, every October during the Festival of their local patron saint, San Miguel Arcángel, Uriangatenses lay down homemade colorful religious carpets in their city's streets. They also construct large religious arches, decked with elaborate flower and lighting arrangements. These costly "arcos" fill Uriangato's narrow byways.

== Culture ==
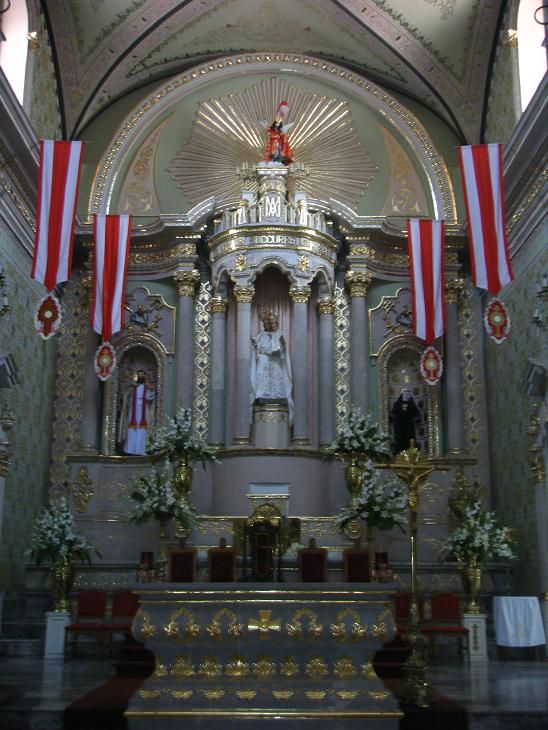
Interior of San Miguel Arcángel's church in Uriangato, recovered in 2008.

=== Holidays ===
- Verbena de Reyes (January 4, 5, and 6)
- Carnival Parade (date varies in February)
- Anniversary of the Founding of Uriangato (February 20)
- Holiday of Saint Joseph in San José Cuaracurío (March 19)
- Spring Parade (March 21)
- Holiday of Jesus of Nazareth in El Cuitzillo (date varies: March–April during Holy Week)
- Performance of washing of the feet (date varies in March–April: Maundy Thursday)
- Performance of the three falls of Jesus (date varies in March–April: Good Friday)
- Performance of the hanging of Judas (date varies in March–April: Holy Saturday)
- Holiday of the cross in El Derramadero (May 3)
- Student parade (date varies in May)
- Holiday of the Sacred Heart of Jesus (varies: Friday in June)
- Anniversary of the Heroic Defense of Uriangato (June 24)
- Walk of the Holy Boy of Cuamio in El Derramadero and El Aguacate (Date varies in July or August)
- Holiday of Saint Nicholas in Cupuato (September 10)
- Open-air dance of the cry of Independence (September 15)
- Parade of the anniversary of Mexican Independence (September 16)
- Novena of Saint Michael with the Candiles Uriangato (September 21 to 29)
- Holiday Saint Michael, Patron Saint of Uriangato (September 29)
- Tradition of La Octava with the walk of Saint Michael (Tapetes Uriangato) (October 6)
- Celebration of Day of the Dead with the display of altars for the dead (November 1 and 2)
- Parade of the anniversary of the Mexican Revolution (November 20)
- Holiday of the Virgin of Guadalupe (December 12)
- Holiday of the Señor del Zapotito in la Lagunilla del Rico (December 20)
- Christmas Festival (varies: second fortnight of December)
- Parade floats and performance of local dances (December 25)
