= Santiago Maravatío =

Coordinates: 20°10′N 101°00′W

- Municipality
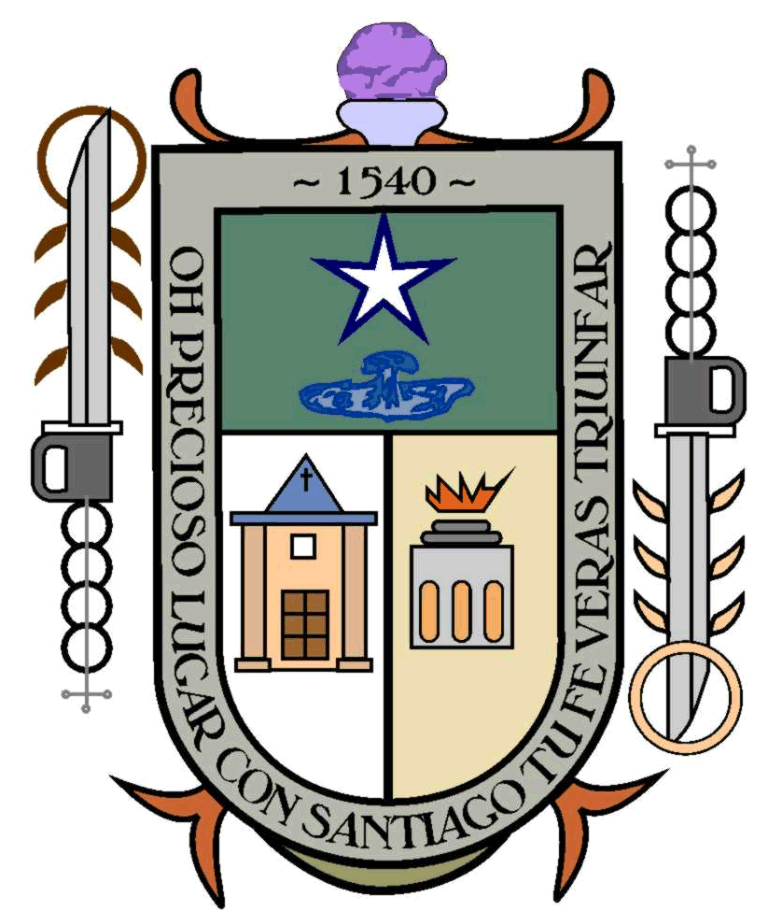
- Coat of arms

- Location in Guanajuato Santiago Maravatío (Mexico)
- Country: Mexico
- State: Guanajuato
- Demonym: (in Spanish)
- Time zone: UTC−6 (CST)

Santiago Maravatío is a Mexican city (and municipality) located in the Bajío (lowlands) of the state of Guanajuato. With an area of 91.760 square kilometres, Santiago Maravatío accounts for less than 1% of the surface of the state. It is bordered to the north, east and southeast by Salvatierra and to the west by Yuriria.

Santiago Maravatío was founded on July 25, 1540 and was named after St. James (Apóstol Santiago el Mayor), the patron saint of Spain, in what had been a Chichimeca community (Maravatío in Purepecha means "Precious Place").

The municipality had a total of 7,151 inhabitants as of 2006. The municipal president of Santiago Maravatío and its ten microregions is Leonel Flores. The economy of the municipality is mostly based on agriculture and ranching.
