= Yuriria =

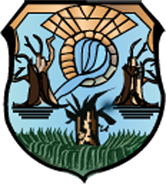
- Coat of arms

- Location of Yuriria municipality in Guanajuato
- Coordinates: 20°12′N 101°09′W
- Country: Mexico
- State: Guanajuato

Population (2020)
  - Total: 68,741
- Website: http://www.yuriria.gob.mx/

Yuriria, Guanajuato, Mexico (Spanish: [ɟʝuˈɾiɾja]), is one of 46 municipalities in the Mexican state of Guanajuato.

== History ==
The name Yuriria is a shortened version of "Yuririapúndaro" (you-ri-ri-ah-PUHN-da-Ro), which means Place of the Bloody Lake in the Purépecha language.

In 1548, Friar Diego de Chávez, of the Augustinian Order, supervised construction of a canal from the Lerma River to the east to enlarge Lake Yuriria with water from the river. Friar Diego de Chávez also founded the Augustinan Monastery, work on which began in 1566 under the supervision of architect Pedro del Toro. The monastery was fortified to deter Chichimec raids.

== Population ==
The population of Yuriria and its surrounding areas totals 68,741 people. Of these, only 25,845 live in urban Yuriria, while 42,846 live in the rural areas surrounding the main town. The largest rural settlements in Yuriria are Cerano (pop. 5,435), El Monte de los Juarez, its main agricultural source with a population of approximately 594, El Xoconoxtle (pop. 731), La Calera (pop. 1,767) and Casacuarán (pop. 2,184). Santa Monica Ozumbilla is one of the oldest communities in Yuriria dating as far back as the early 16th century.

== Landmarks ==
Landmarks in the municipality include:

=== Ex-Convento San Agustín ===
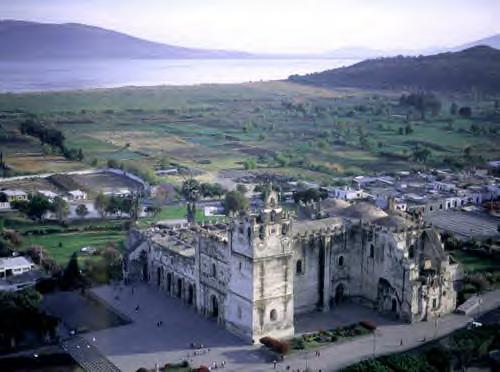
The Parroquia of Yuriria, important cultural icon of the state

The Ex-Covento, or cathedral is probably the most important architectural structure in Yuriria, as well as an important icon in the state in general. Since its construction in November 1550, and its culmination on 1559, its massive size and dazzling structure captured the attention of generations, and ultimately put Yuriria on the map. Its construction was started by Fray Diego de Chavez, nephew of the conquistador Don Pedro Alvarado and was designed by the famous architect Pedro del Toro.

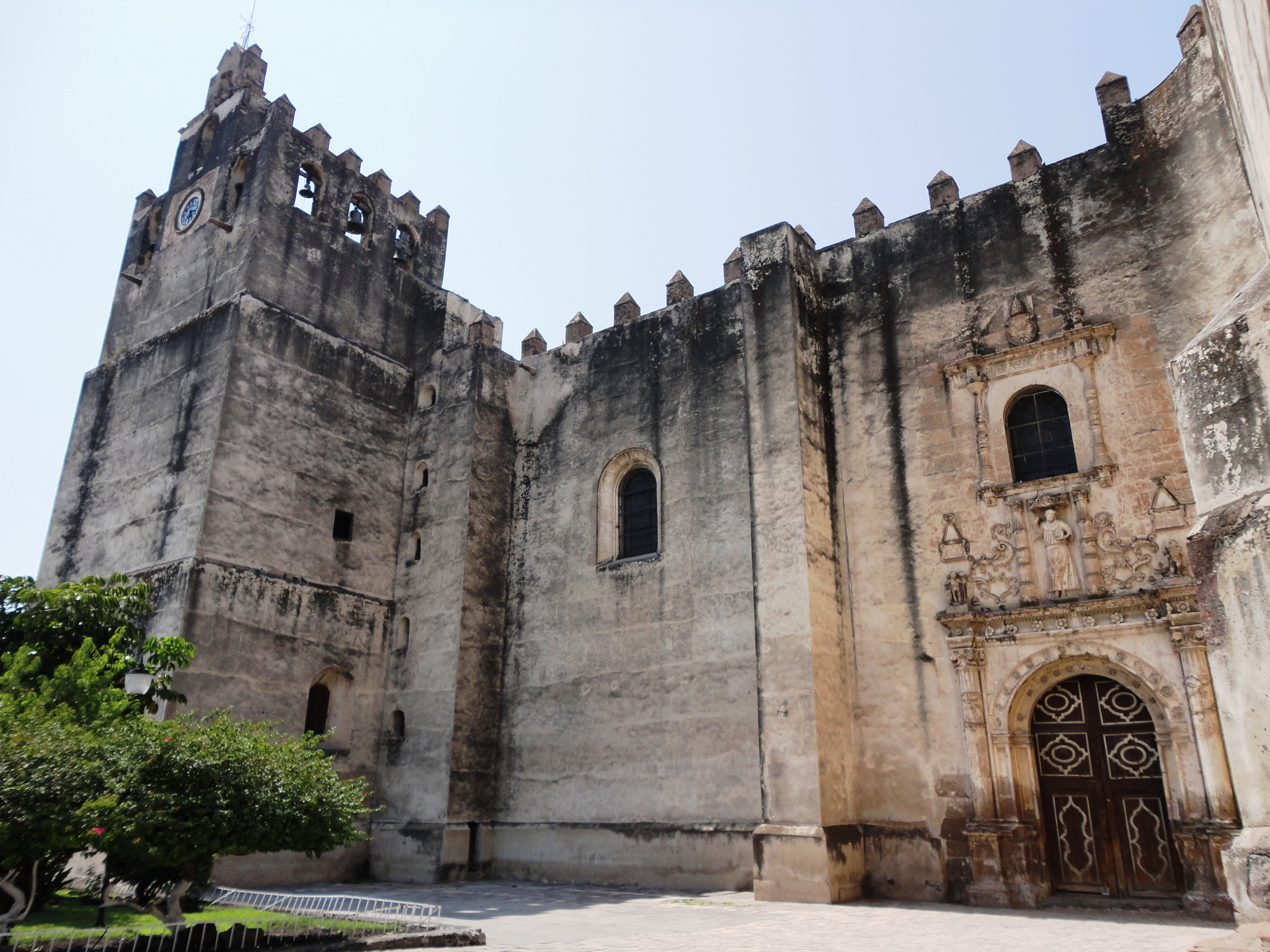
Convento de San Agustín de Yuriria.

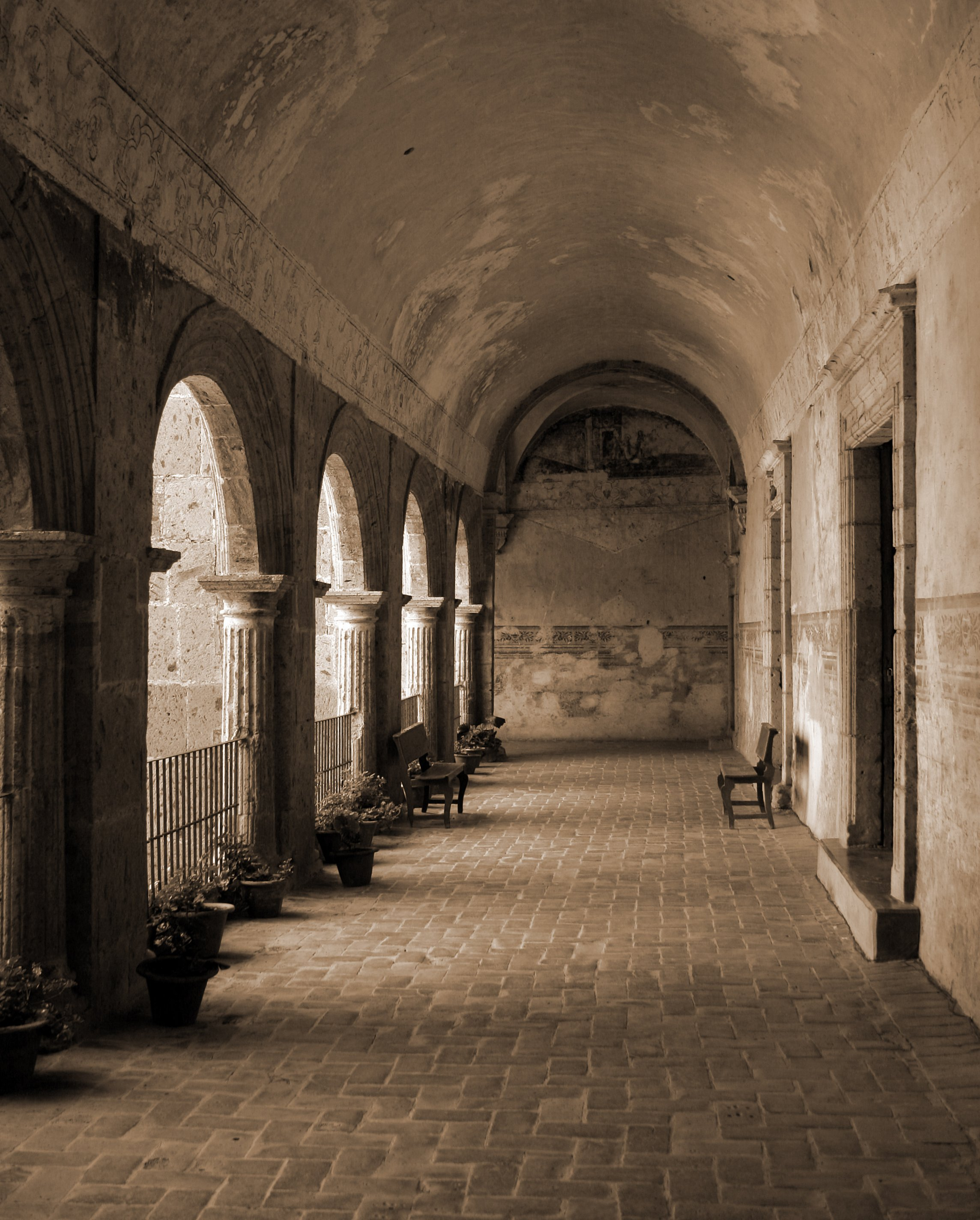
Interior view of Yuriria Convent.

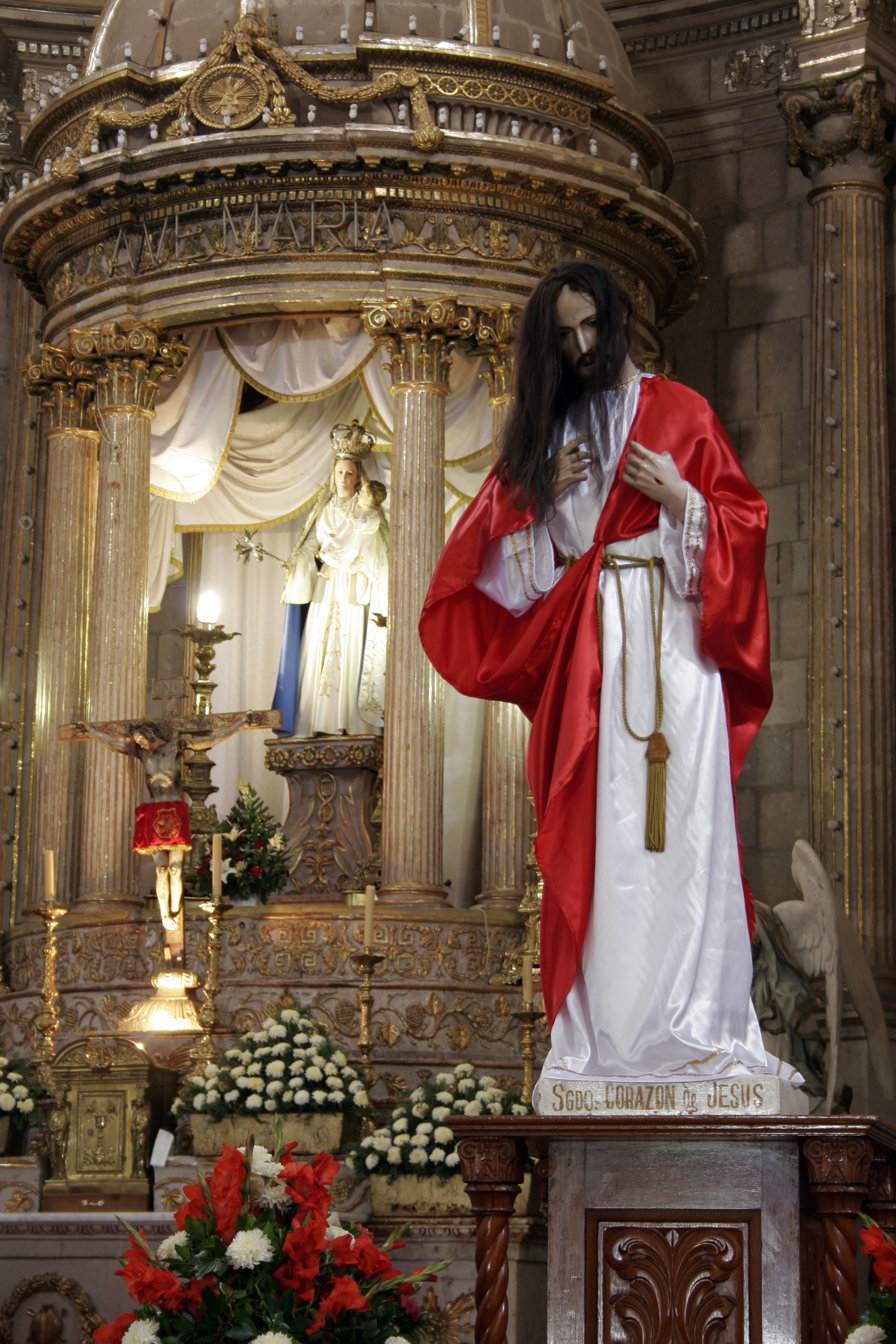
Detail of the Temple of the Ex-Convent of San Agustín de Yuriria.

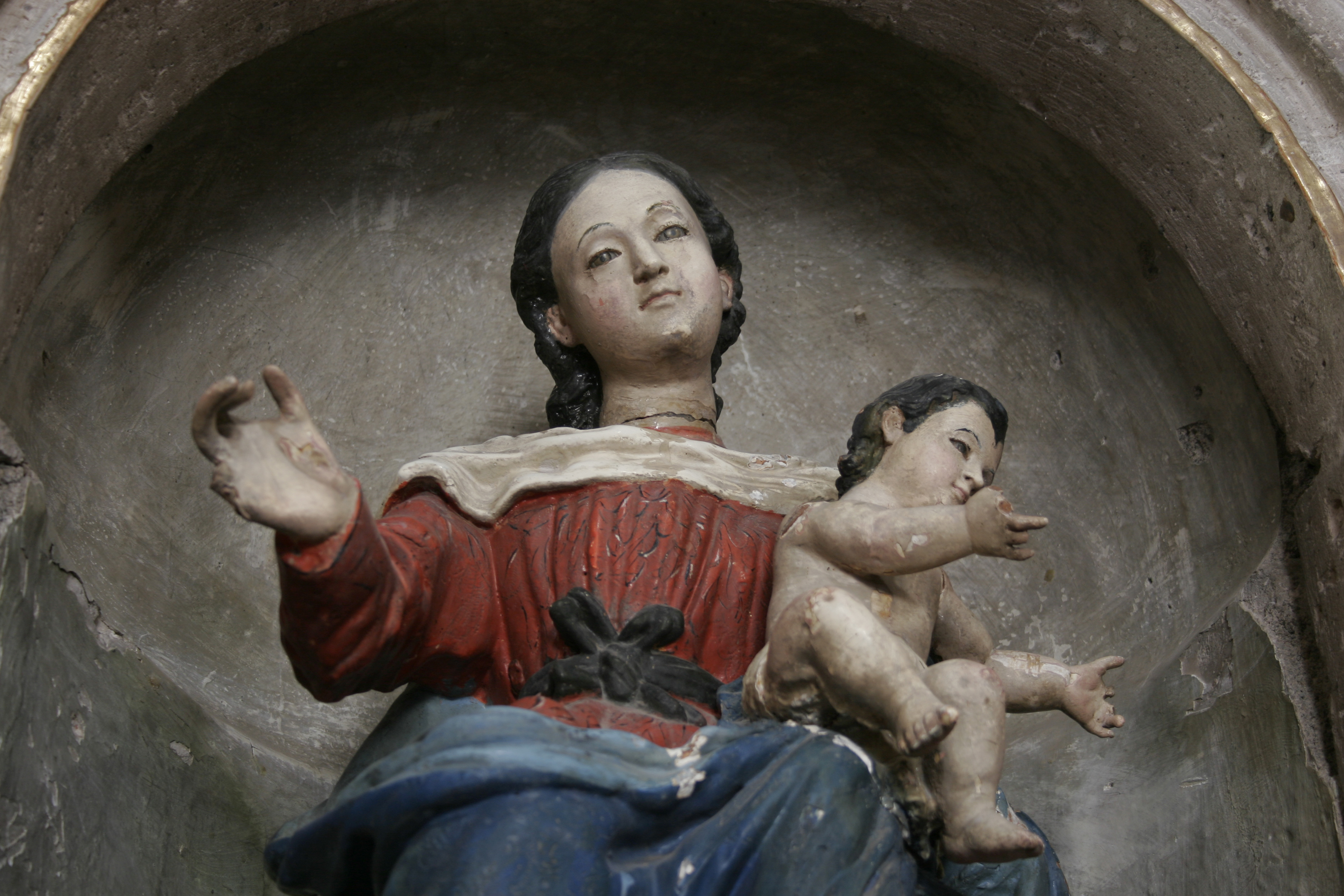
Detail of the Temple of the Ex-Convent of San Agustín de Yuriria.

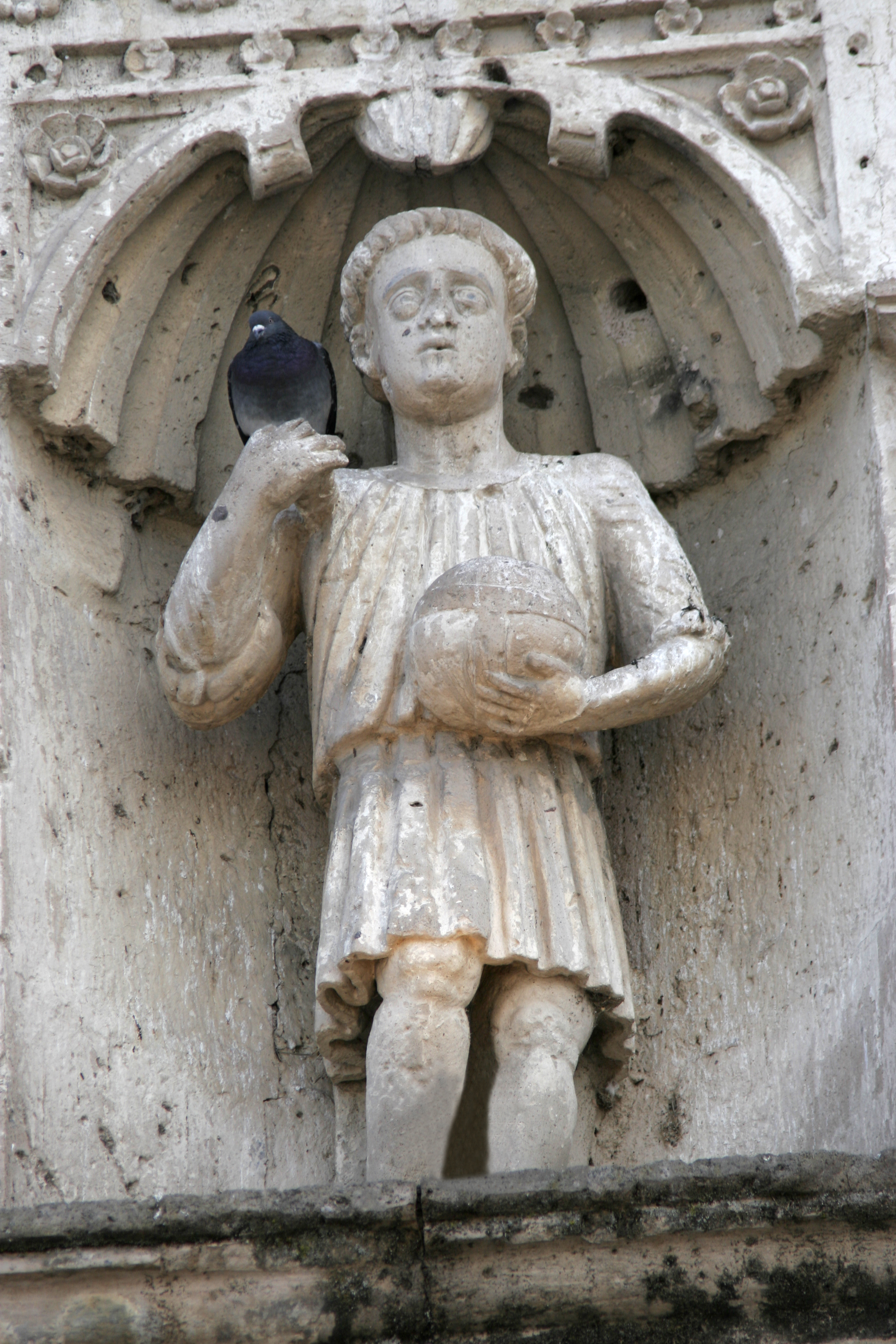
Detail of the Temple of the Ex-Convent of San Agustín de Yuriria.

=== Templo de la Preciosa Sangre de Cristo ===
The Templo de la Preciosa Sangre de Cristo (Temple of the Precious Blood of Christ) is a 19th century church which houses a 17th century black figure of Christ.

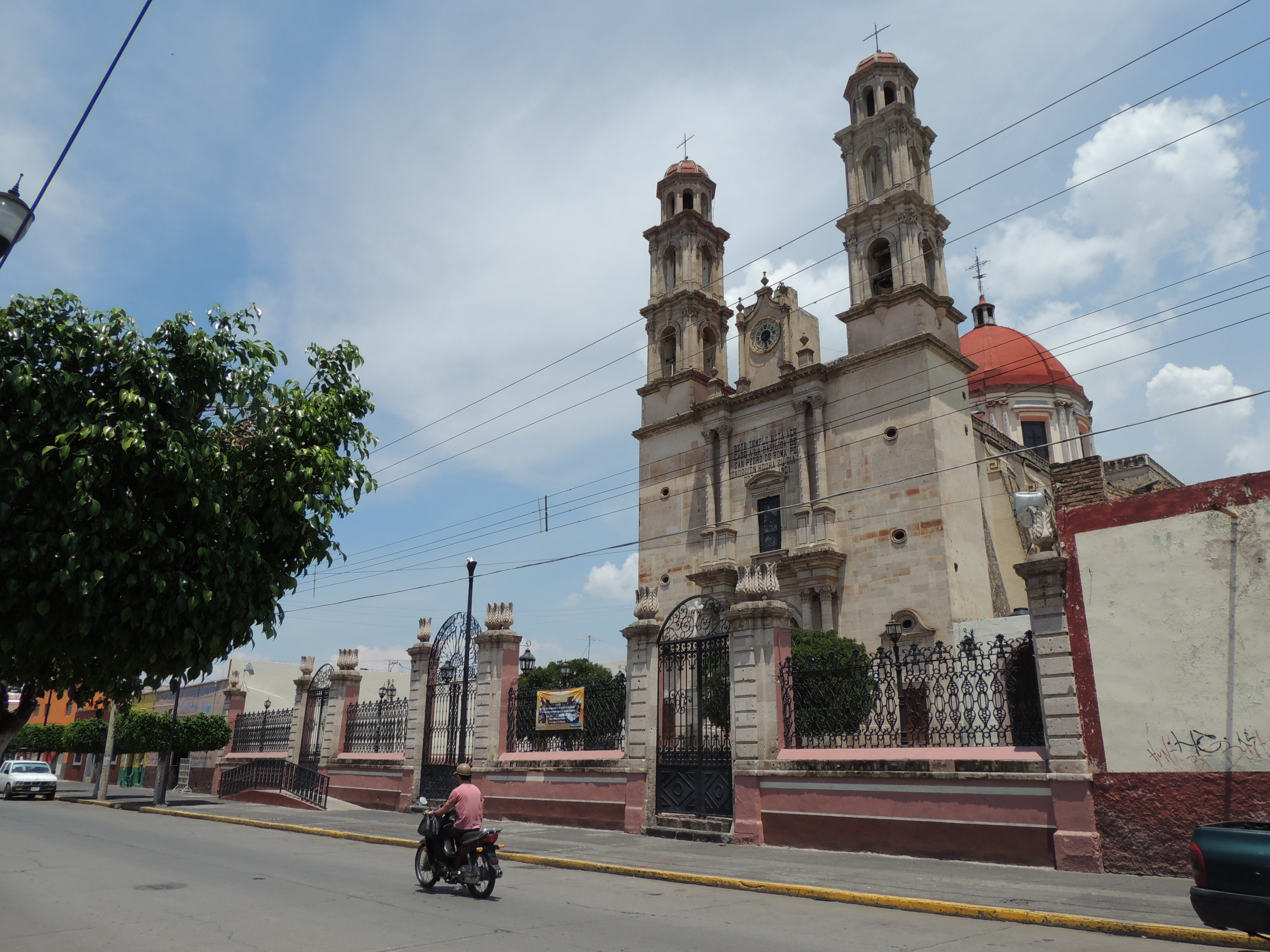
Templo de la Preciosa Sangre de Cristo.

== Geography ==
Yuriria is located in the "Bajío", or lowlands, of Guanajuato. It is bordered to the east by Salvatierra and Santiago Maravatío, to the north by Jaral del Progreso and Valle de Santiago, to the south by Uriangato and Moroleón, and to the west by the state of Michoacán. Its total area is 656 square kilometres.

The town of Yuriria lies on the southern shore of Lake Yuriria, a shallow reservoir fed by water from the Lerma River.

=== Climate ===
Climate data for Yuriria
Month	Jan	Feb	Mar	Apr	May	Jun	Jul	Aug	Sep	Oct	Nov	Dec	Year
Mean daily maximum °C (°F)	23.1 (73.6)	25 (77)	27.7 (81.9)	29.9 (85.8)	31.0 (87.8)	29.2 (84.6)	27.1 (80.8)	26.7 (80.1)	25.9 (78.6)	25.2 (77.4)	24.4 (75.9)	23.1 (73.6)	26.5 (79.7)
Mean daily minimum °C (°F)	6.6 (43.9)	7.6 (45.7)	10.1 (50.2)	12.5 (54.5)	14.7 (58.5)	15.5 (59.9)	14.7 (58.5)	14.6 (58.3)	14.4 (57.9)	12.0 (53.6)	9.0 (48.2)	7 (45)	11.6 (52.9)
Average precipitation mm (inches)	13 (0.5)	7.6 (0.3)	7.6 (0.3)	10 (0.4)	30 (1.2)	120 (4.7)	150 (6)	150 (6.1)	120 (4.6)	46 (1.8)	13 (0.5)	7.6 (0.3)	670 (26.5)
Source: Weatherbase

== See also ==
- Porullo
